= Fauna of Florida =

Fauna of the US state of Florida

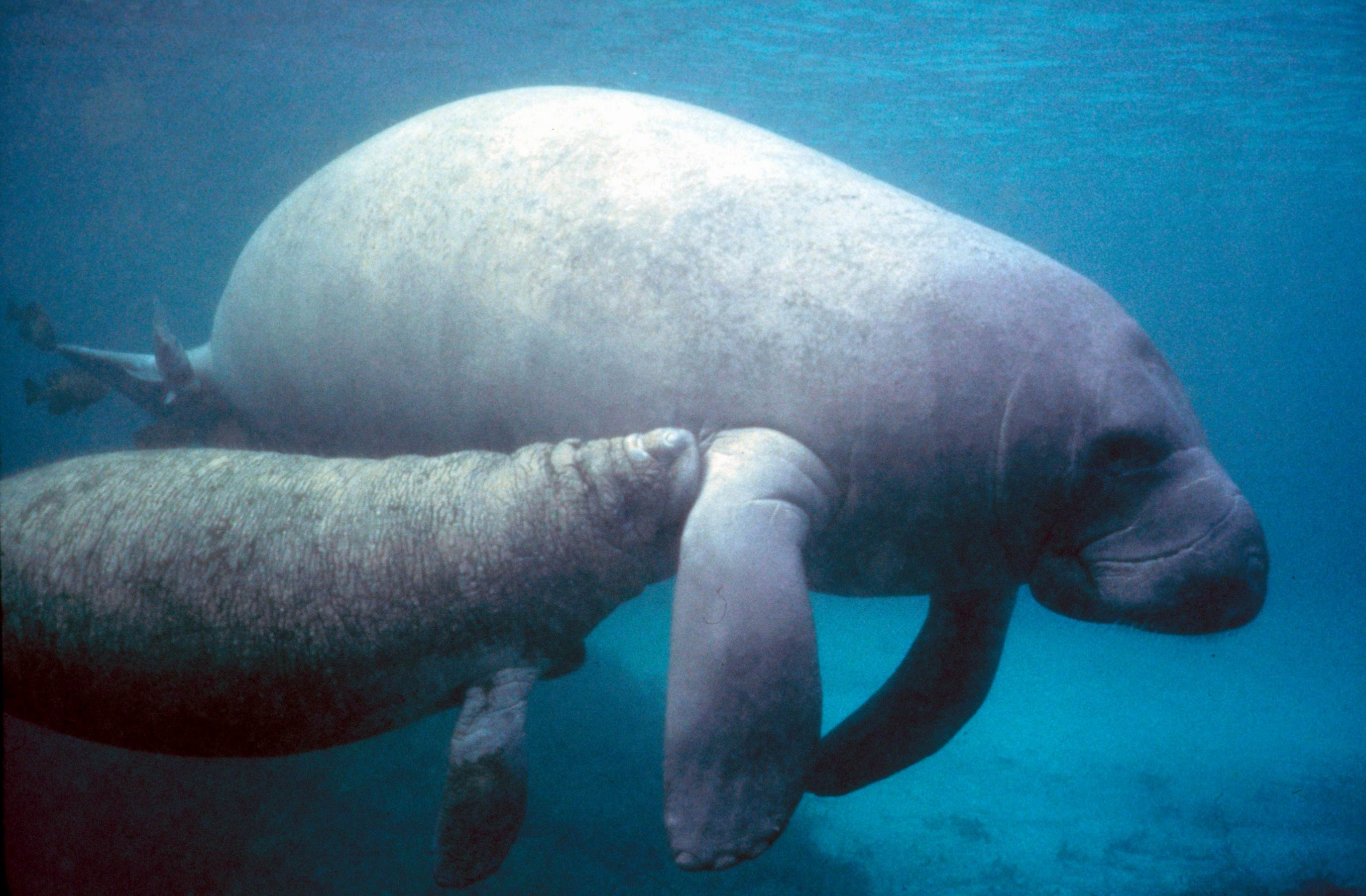
West Indian manatee

Florida hosts many types of fauna from its coral reefs of the Florida Keys to the cypress swamps of the Panhandle and along its extensive coastline and barrier islands, the state's diverse habitats are home to a variety of wildlife. Florida is among the top five states in terms of endemic species. There are over 700 terrestrial animals, 200 freshwater fish species, 1,000 marine fish and thousands of terrestrial insects and other invertebrates that inhabit the state. Florida's peninsular geography spans from subtropical to tropical zones, which, combined with its distinctive geology and climate, contribute to habitat diversity and an array of species. The native wildlife that exists in the state are of temperate and tropical origin.

Florida had a large number of species that formerly occupied the state in prehistoric and historic times, but became locally extinct or extirpated; such as the Florida short-faced bear, Florida black wolf, Dire wolf, Dexteria floridana, Florida bog lemming, Long-nosed peccary, Caribbean monk seal, Carolina parakeet, Great auk, Passenger pigeon, Ivory-billed woodpecker, Bachman's warbler, Dusky seaside sparrow, Pallid beach mouse, Chadwick Beach cotton mouse, Goff's pocket gopher, California condor, Island raccoon, Northern short-tailed shrew, magpie, indigo snake, northern leopard frog, porcupine, great black hawk, red wolf, elk, hog-nosed skunk, gray wolf, underwood's bonneted bat, Pristine mustached bat, white-tailed jackrabbit, band-tailed pigeon, jaguar, margay, jabiru, ocelot, ghost-faced bat, collared peccary, great-tailed grackle, ringed kingfisher, common opossum, gray-breasted crake, Northern jacana, yellow-headed caracara, ruffed grouse, Southern lapwing and greater prairie chicken.

== Mammals ==
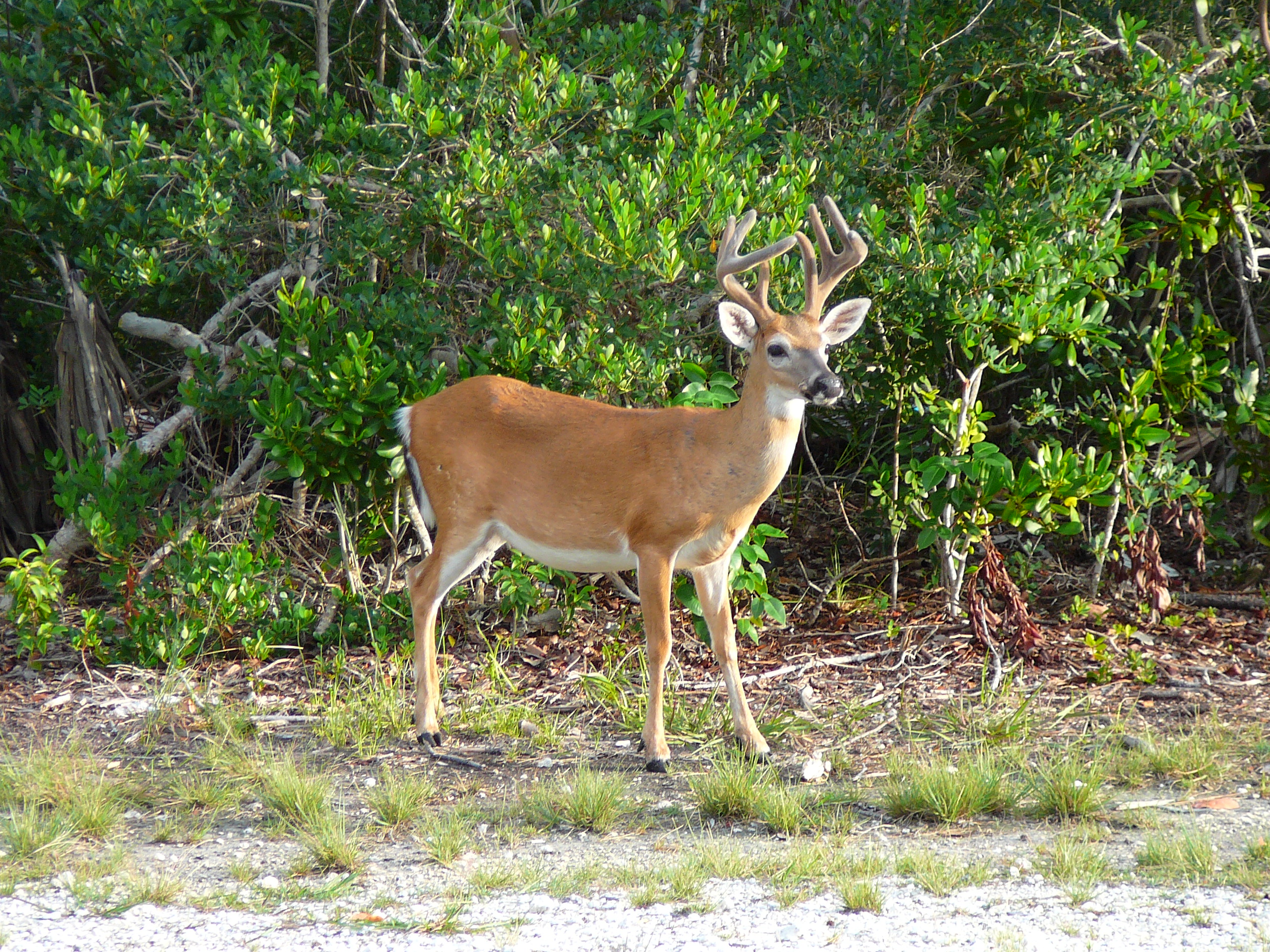
Key deer in the lower Florida Keys

Aquatic mammal species are represented by the bottlenose dolphin, short-finned pilot whale, North Atlantic right whale and West Indian manatee. Terrestrial species; the Florida panther, northern river otter, mink, eastern cottontail rabbit, marsh rabbit, raccoon, striped skunk, squirrel, white-tailed deer, bobcat, red fox, gray fox, coyote, beaver, Florida black bear, nine-banded armadillo, and Virginia opossum. The only known calving area for the northern right whale is off the coasts of Florida and Georgia.

The native bear population has risen from a historic low of 300 in the 1970s, to 3,000 in 2011. A new ruling issued 172 hunters permits allowing the hunters to kill 52 black bears during the 2025 hunting season to help manage the black bear population. In Paynes Prairie Preserve State Park, The plains bison were reintroduced to the park from the Wichita Mountains Wildlife Refuge in 1975, as part of the park service goal of restoring Florida's natural resources to pre-European settler conditions; they roamed this area until the late 18th century. When bison sightings occur, they usually appear along the Cone's Dike trail. The herd was reduced from thirty-five to seven individuals in the mid-1980s after an outbreak of Brucellosis. In the late 1990s, the herd was again reduced after inbreeding concerns. The buffalo herd reached a peak of 70 animals in 2011. The park began culling excessive animals in 2012, allowing a target population of about 8 to 10 bison to be free to roam the Florida prairie.

== Birds ==
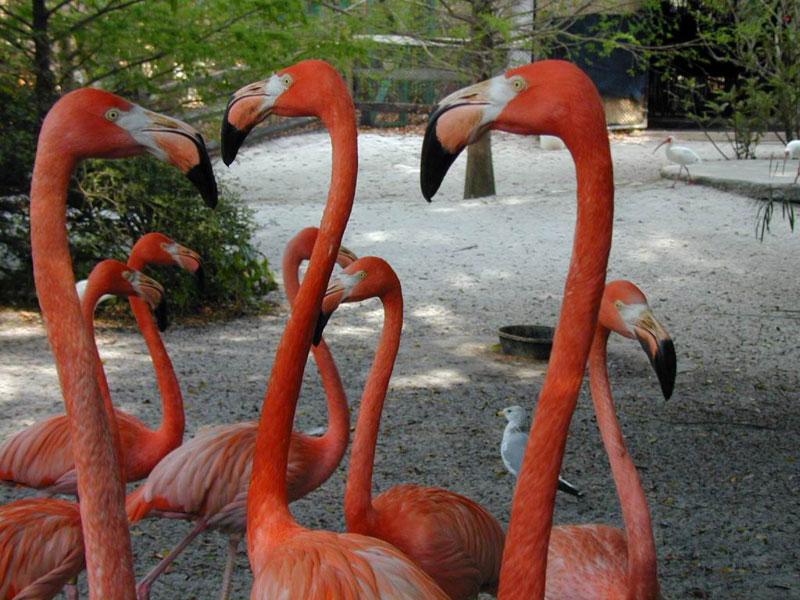
American flamingos in South Florida

Bird species include the Peregrine falcon, bald eagle, American flamingo, crested caracara, snail kite, osprey, white and brown pelicans, sea gulls, whooping and sandhill cranes, roseate spoonbill, American white ibis, Florida scrub jay (state endemic), and others. One subspecies of wild turkey, Meleagris gallopavo, namely subspecies osceola, is found only in Florida. The state is a wintering location for many species of eastern North American birds.

There have been small numbers of several new species normally native to cooler areas to the north: snowy owls, snow buntings, harlequin ducks, and razorbills. These have been seen in the northern part of the state.

The American flamingo was also found in South Florida, which was likely the northernmost extent of its distribution. The study also indicated that these flamingos may be increasing in population and reclaiming their lost land. Large flocks of flamingos are still known to visit Florida from time to time, most notably in 2014, when a very large flock of over 147 flamingos temporarily stayed at Stormwater Treatment Area 2, on Lake Okeechobee, with a few returning the following year. From a distance, untrained eyes can also confuse it with the roseate spoonbill.

== Reptiles ==
Indigenous reptiles include Eastern diamondback, pygmy rattlesnakes, gopher tortoise, green and leatherback sea turtles, and eastern indigo snake and eastern fence lizard. In 2012, there were about one million American alligators and 1,500 crocodiles. The highest species of freshwater turtles (consisting of 13 species) in Florida occur in the Escambia River basin. Other basins, particularly in the panhandle and northern central of the state contain 12 species. North Florida has the third richest turtle fauna in the world. The state's native species has 31 turtles, 15 lizards, 2 crocodilians, and 40 snakes.

== Amphibians ==
Florida is home to forty-nine native species of amphibians, including 29 frogs, 19 salamanders and 4 that are of special concern. Examples of amphibians inhabiting Florida include mole salamander, American bullfrog, lesser siren, eastern newt, gopher frog, three-lined salamander and green frog. Specimens belonging to the reticulated siren have been found in the northern part of the state, even though the species was first described in 2018.

Florida is part of the southeastern United States, a region with high amphibian biodiversity. Long Term monitoring helps researchers understand amphibian population changes, identify research gaps, and support conservation planning.

== Fish ==
About 250 different species of fish (including 73 non-native species) inhabit Florida. There are more than 1,000 species of fish occurring in the state's inshore waters. Florida's coral reef habitats, particularly in the Florida Keys and Dry Tortugas, support diverse reef fish communities that contribute to broader marine food webs and assist in maintaining the ecological balance. Herbivorous reef fishes in these areas help maintain coral reef ecosystems by grazing on algae, with their clear abundance and species richness, in which is influenced by habitat features such as depth, reef relief, and location.

== Crustaceans, Cephalopods, and Medusozoas ==
There are wide numbers of Crustaceans, Cephalopods, and Medusozoas in the ocean and coral reefs close to Florida. Crustaceans like Florida stone crab, Blue land crab, Atlantic blue crab, Jonah crab, Mangrove tree crab, Caribbean hermit crab, Sargassum swimming crab, Atlantic horseshoe crab, Yellowline arrow crab, Panulirus argus, Gnathia jimmybuffetti, Heterocarpus ensifer, Spotted cleaner shrimp, Procambarus acherontis, Procambarus alleni, Procambarus apalachicolae, Procambarus attiguus, Procambarus delicatus, Procambarus econfinae, Procambarus erythrops, Procambarus franzi, Procambarus horsti, Procambarus latipleurum, Procambarus leitheuseri, Procambarus lucifugus, Procambarus lucifugus alachua, Procambarus lucifugus lucifugus, Procambarus milleri, Procambarus morrisi, Procambarus orcinus, Procambarus pictus, and Procambarus rathbunae are native and endemic to Florida. Cephalopods such as Caribbean reef squid, northern shortfin squid, Bigfin squid, Grass squid, Octopus insularis, and Atlantic pygmy octopus are found native to Florida saltwaters. Chiropsalmus quadrumanus, Phyllorhiza punctata, Portuguese man o' war and Glaucus atlanticus are also seen in Florida beach waters.

== Invertebrates ==
Notable examples of insect species include Carpenter ants, termites, American cockroach, Florida woods cockroach, Zebra longwing, the Miami blue butterfly, and the grizzled mantis. The Red Widow Spider in a relative of the also native Black Widow, though the Red Widow is endemic to Florida and threatened by habitat loss. There are 29 species or subspecies of bees that are endemic within the state of Florida and are not believed to occur anywhere else in the world, including 21 types of pollinators and 8 parasitic species of Bees. Southern Florida pine rock lands support specialized plant-pollinator relationships, including interactions between oil-collecting bees and native oil-producing plants.

== Habitat Impacts ==
Florida's fauna is aligned with the states many habitats, such as beaches, wetlands, forests, and coral reefs. Beach ecosystems, especially in Southeastern Florida, support wildlife while also being heavily used for recreation and infrastructure development. Urban development and extensive beach alteration have reduced naturally functioning beach habitat, which can also affect the biodiversity of coastal ecosystems.

== Nonnative wildlife ==
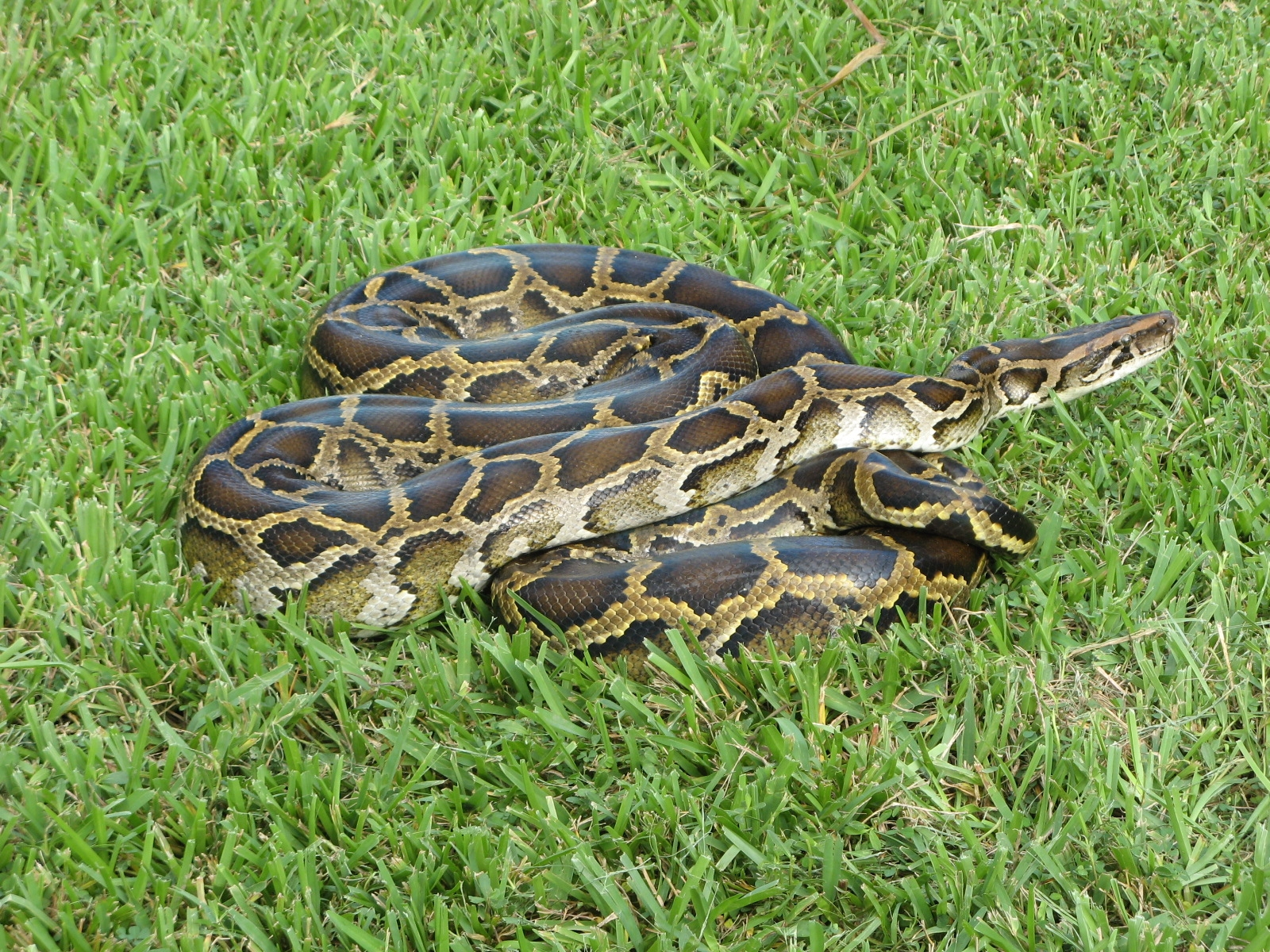
Burmese pythons have decreased the number of native species in the Everglades

Florida also has more than 500 nonnative animal species and 1,000 nonnative insects found throughout the state. Florida's climate, ports, tourism, and diverse ecosystems make the state vulnerable to biological invasions. Along with common introduction pathways including ballast water, vessel biofouling, and escape from the pet, aquarium and horticulture trades. Some exotic species living in Florida include the Burmese python, Red lionfish, Common lionfish, Boar–pig hybrid, green iguana, Peter's rock agama, veiled chameleon, Argentine black and white tegu, peacock bass, mayan cichlid, Africanized bee, Nile monitor lizard, White-nosed coati, rhesus macaque, vervet monkey, Cuban tree frog, cane toad, Indian peafowl, monk parakeet, tui parakeet, and many more. Some of these nonnative species do not pose a threat to any native species, but some do threaten the native species of Florida by living in the state and eating them. Florida is now known as the invasive species capital of the United States or the World.

Surveys in Miami Dade County repeated in 2017 and 2022 found that non-native reptiles and amphibians increased over five years, with overall non-native richness and abundance rising by 19% and 33%, respectively. Agama picticauda and Leiocephalus carinatus were among the most rapidly spreading species.

Six Red deer were released on Buck Island Breeding Ranch in Highlands County in 1967 or 1968. The herd increased to less than 30 animals. In 1993, 10 animals were seen in the area, and small numbers have been sighted subsequently in the same area.

Since their accidental importation from South America into North America in the 1930s, the red imported fire ant population has increased its territorial range to include most of the southern United States, including Florida. They are more aggressive than most native ant species and have a painful sting.

A number of non-native snakes and lizards have been released in the wild. In 2010, the state created a hunting season for Burmese and Indian pythons, African rock pythons, Reticulated pythons, Northern green anacondas, green anacondas, yellow anacondas, common boas, and Nile monitor lizards. Green iguanas have also established a firm population in the southern part of the state. Due to a combination of events, the green iguana is considered an invasive species in South Florida and is found along the east coast as well as the Gulf Coast of Florida from Key West to Pinellas County.

There are about 500,000 feral pigs in Florida.

== Lists ==
- Amphibians
- Birds
  - in Biscayne National Park
  - in Dry Tortugas National Park
  - in Everglades National Park
- Fish
- Mammals
- Reptiles
  - Snakes
    - Burmese pythons
- Paleontology in Florida
- List of the prehistoric life of Florida
- List of the Cenozoic life of Florida

There are a number of invasive species in the state:

- Invasive species
  - in the Everglades
  - Fish

== See also ==
- Florida Fish and Wildlife Conservation Commission
- Wildlife regulations in Florida
- List of giant squid specimens and sightings
