= Procambarus lucifugus lucifugus =

Conservation status
- Endangered (IUCN 3.1)

- Critically Imperiled (NatureServe)

Scientific classification
- Kingdom: Animalia
- Phylum: Arthropoda
- Clade: Pancrustacea
- Class: Malacostraca
- Order: Decapoda
- Suborder: Pleocyemata
- Family: Cambaridae
- Genus: Procambarus
- Species: P. lucifugus
- Subspecies: P. l. lucifugus

Trinomial name
- Procambarus lucifugus lucifugus Hobbs, 1940

Subspecies of crayfish

Procambarus lucifugus lucifugus, known as the Withlocoochee light-fleeing cave crayfish, is one of two subspecies of the vampire crayfish (Procambarus lucifugus), along with Procambarus lucifugus alachua. It is distinct from P. l. alachua due its lack of eyespots. Intergrades of the two P. lucifugus subspecies, P. l. alachua as well as P. erythrops and P. leitheuseri have been found to have little genetic differentiation, especially when compared to P. l. lucifugus which is distinct from all of those. It has been suggested that P. l. lucifugus may prove to be a different species, found only in two freshwater caves, the location of one of which is unknown.

== Distribution ==
Procambarus lucifugus lucifugus is only found in subterranean waters of two caves, one of which is the Gum Cave, about 7 miles (11.2 km) southwest of Floral City in Citrus County, Florida. It is also known to occur in a cave in the Hernando County, northward to Marion County, Florida, where it interbreeds to form intergrades with P. l. alachua.
