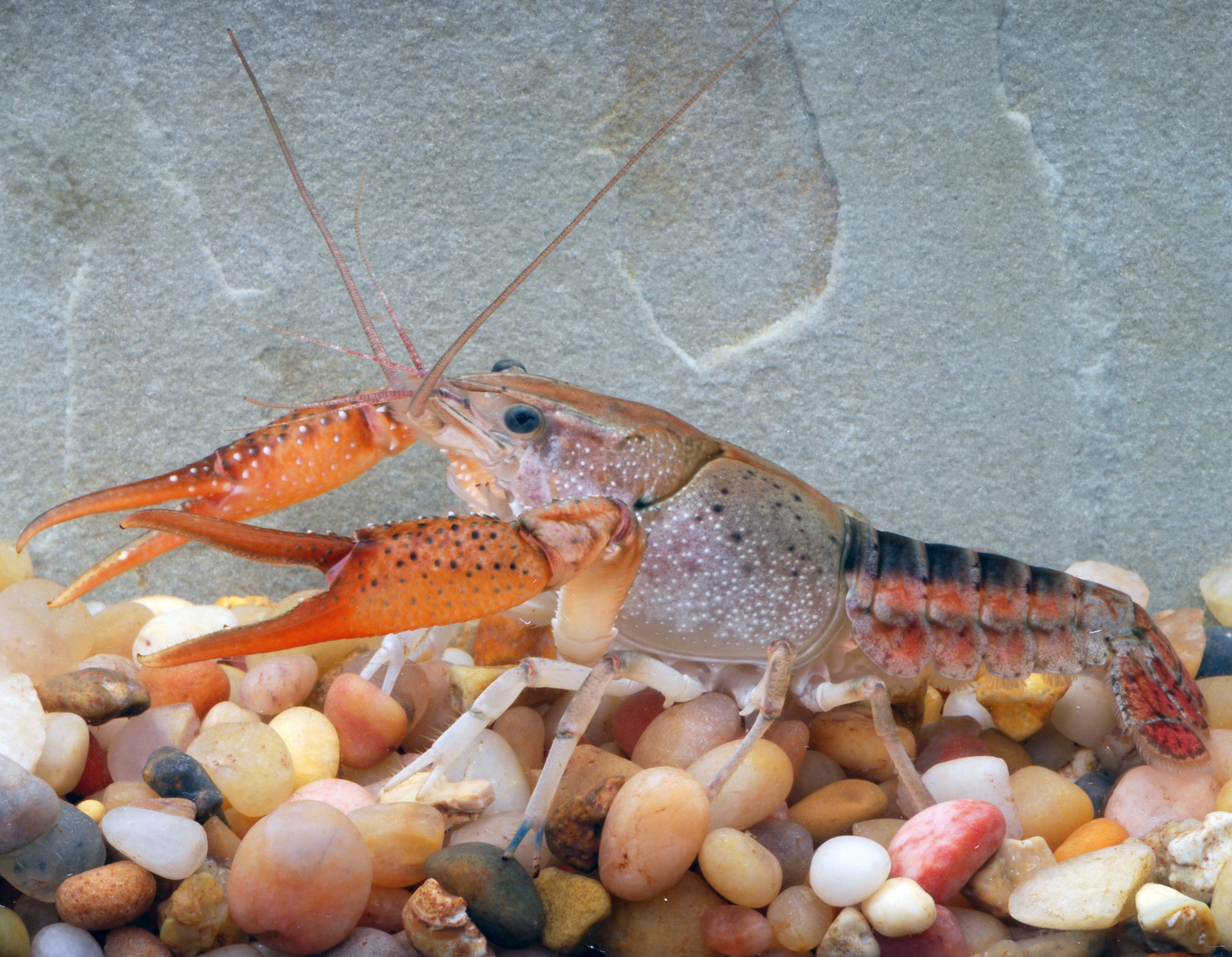

Conservation status
- Data Deficient (IUCN 3.1)

- Secure (NatureServe)

Scientific classification
- Kingdom: Animalia
- Phylum: Arthropoda
- Class: Malacostraca
- Order: Decapoda
- Suborder: Pleocyemata
- Family: Cambaridae
- Genus: Procambarus
- Species: P. zonangulus

Binomial name
- Procambarus zonangulus Hobbs & Hobbs III, 1990

= Procambarus zonangulus =

Species of crayfish

Procambarus zonangulus, the white river crawfish, white river crayfish or southern white river crayfish, is a species of freshwater crayfish. It is a distinct but closely related species from Procambarus acutus, which is also known as white river crayfish and has a wider range.

== Distribution ==
Procambarus zonangulus was originally described from Jefferson County, Hardin County and Orange County, Texas, where it lives in streams, but the species' natural distribution is unclear, possibly including parts of Alabama, Louisiana and Mississippi. It has also been introduced to other states, including Maryland and West Virginia.

== Habitat ==
This is a species that especially thrives in seasonally flooded wetlands, preferably with actively flowing and well-oxygenated water. Outside of typical seasonal flood seasons they can be found in healthy streams and other strong oxygenated bodies of water.

== Description ==
=== General bauplan ===
P. zonangulus has all of the characteristics used to generally describe a freshwater species of crawfish. Their head is in an almost "tear-drop" like shape, connected to their carapace. On the head there is a set of antennas, followed by two sets of antennules, and then their rostrums and eyes. Between their head and carapace there is a cervical groove. There is a separation of the sides of the back that is called an areola, which almost forms a gap of types in the middle. Following the carapace, they have an abdomen that is finished with a telson and uropod.

=== Claws ===
Their claws tend to become more cylindrical and elongated with age, appearing a lot finer or skinnier than other species in Procambarus.

=== Coloration ===
Their coloration holds true as to why they are commonly referred to as the White River Crawfish, with their legs holding a lighter shade of tan or white as compared to their carapace and head. Mature adults can sometimes appear to have a pink or purplish hue, but never red.

== Conservation ==
P. zonangulus has become an important species for aquaculture, and 20%–30% of the crayfish harvested in Louisiana are P. zonangulus. Due to the taxonomic uncertainties, this species is listed as Data Deficient on the IUCN Red List.

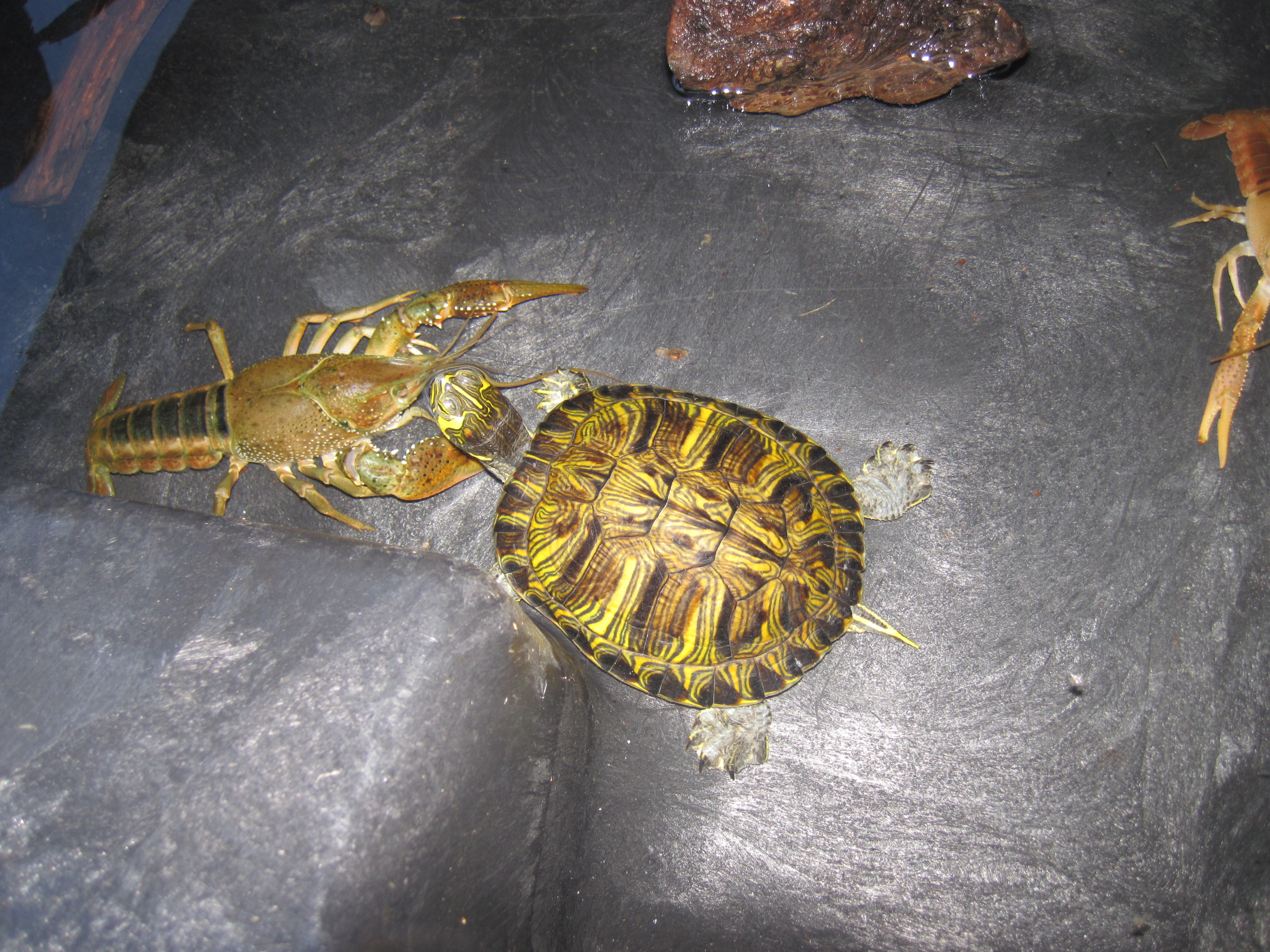
With a yellow-bellied slider in a touch tank

=== Culture methods ===
The two most commonly used methods for farming crawfish are polyculture, raising crawfish alongside crops that can grow in their environments, and monocropping, exclusively raising crawfish.

== Reproduction ==
P. zonangulus, being a species that falls under the Cambaridae family, shares a lot of its reproductive habits with other freshwater crayfish species. They are a gonochoristic species, meaning there are two set sexes within a population, and the males typically have two different morphotypes, one being exclusively for mating.

Females are recorded to lay their eggs in the mid- to late-fall period, typically producing an average of 130 babies per brood. The eggs that are produced are individually larger but as an entire brood smaller than the closely related Procambarus clarkii, more commonly known as the Red Swamp Crawfish.

While this species may have swimmerets, there is currently no published evidence supporting their potential use in reproductive purposes.
