= Procambarus reimeri =

Conservation status
- Data Deficient (IUCN 3.1)

Scientific classification
- Kingdom: Animalia
- Phylum: Arthropoda
- Class: Malacostraca
- Order: Decapoda
- Suborder: Pleocyemata
- Family: Cambaridae
- Genus: Procambarus
- Species: P. reimeri

Binomial name
- Procambarus reimeri Hobbs, 1979

Species of crayfish

Procambarus reimeri is a species of crayfish in the family Cambaridae. It is endemic to the Upper Irons Fork of the Ouachita River basin in Polk County, Arkansas.
