= Procambarus lucifugus alachua =

Conservation status
- Vulnerable (IUCN 3.1)

- Critically Imperiled (NatureServe)

Scientific classification
- Kingdom: Animalia
- Phylum: Arthropoda
- Class: Malacostraca
- Order: Decapoda
- Suborder: Pleocyemata
- Family: Cambaridae
- Genus: Procambarus
- Species: P. lucifugus
- Subspecies: P. l. alachua

Trinomial name
- Procambarus lucifugus alachua Hobbs, 1940

Subspecies of crayfish

Procambarus lucifugus alachua, known as the Alachua light-fleeing cave crayfish, is one of two subspecies of the vampire crayfish (Procambarus lucifugus), along with Procambarus lucifugus lucifugus. It is distinct from P. l. lucifugus due its eyespots.

== Distribution ==
Procambarus lucifugus alachua is found in subterranean waters of two to three dozen caves, 11 of which are in Alachua or Gilchrist counties. It is also known to occur in caves in Marion County, Florida, where it interbreeds to form intergrades with P. l. lucifugus.
