= Procambarus pallidus =

Conservation status
- Near Threatened (IUCN 3.1)

- Imperiled (NatureServe)

Scientific classification
- Kingdom: Animalia
- Phylum: Arthropoda
- Class: Malacostraca
- Order: Decapoda
- Suborder: Pleocyemata
- Family: Cambaridae
- Genus: Procambarus
- Species: P. pallidus

Binomial name
- Procambarus pallidus (Hobbs, 1940)

Species of crayfish

Procambarus pallidus, the pallid cave crayfish, is a freshwater crayfish native to over 80 caves in Florida and Georgia in the United States.
