= Procambarus niveus =

Conservation status
- Data Deficient (IUCN 3.1)

Scientific classification
- Kingdom: Animalia
- Phylum: Arthropoda
- Class: Malacostraca
- Order: Decapoda
- Suborder: Pleocyemata
- Family: Cambaridae
- Genus: Procambarus
- Species: P. niveus

Binomial name
- Procambarus niveus Hobbs & Villalobos, 1964

Species of crayfish

Procambarus niveus is a small, freshwater crayfish endemic to Cuba. It is a cave-dwelling species known from only one cave, Cuevas de Santo Tomas, in the Sierra de los Organos mountains, Pinar del Río Province.
