= Procambarus nechesae =

Conservation status
- Least Concern (IUCN 3.1)

- Imperiled (NatureServe)

Scientific classification
- Kingdom: Animalia
- Phylum: Arthropoda
- Clade: Pancrustacea
- Class: Malacostraca
- Order: Decapoda
- Suborder: Pleocyemata
- Family: Cambaridae
- Genus: Procambarus
- Species: P. nechesae

Binomial name
- Procambarus nechesae Hobbs, 1990

Species of crayfish

Procambarus nechesae, sometimes called the Neches crayfish, is a species of crustacean in the family Cambaridae. It is endemic to Texas and is listed as a species of Least Concern on the IUCN Red List.
