= Procambarus plumimanus =

Conservation status
- Least Concern (IUCN 3.1)

Scientific classification
- Kingdom: Animalia
- Phylum: Arthropoda
- Clade: Pancrustacea
- Class: Malacostraca
- Order: Decapoda
- Suborder: Pleocyemata
- Family: Cambaridae
- Genus: Procambarus
- Species: P. plumimanus

Binomial name
- Procambarus plumimanus Hobbs & Walton, 1958

Species of crayfish

Procambarus plumimanus is a species of crayfish in the family Cambaridae. It is endemic to North Carolina. It is known from several locations, where it is often abundant. It is known commonly as the Croatan crayfish.

This crayfish is cylindrical in shape. It is light brown in color with dark mottling and washes of pastel greens and pinks.

This species lives on the coastal plain of North Carolina in a number of river systems. It lives in swampy habitat types, often in small, artificial, and temporary bodies of water. It will burrow into the substrate during dry periods.

It is listed as a least-concern species by the International Union for Conservation of Nature (IUCN). It has a limited geographical range but there is more than enough habitat available to support its populations, and its range has recently expanded.
