= Procambarus regalis =

Conservation status
- Data Deficient (IUCN 3.1)

- Imperiled (NatureServe)

Scientific classification
- Kingdom: Animalia
- Phylum: Arthropoda
- Class: Malacostraca
- Order: Decapoda
- Suborder: Pleocyemata
- Family: Cambaridae
- Genus: Procambarus
- Species: P. regalis

Binomial name
- Procambarus regalis Hobbs and Robison, 1988

Species of crayfish

Procambarus regalis, sometimes called the regal burrowing crayfish, is a species of crayfish in the family Cambaridae. It is native to Texas and Arkansas, and is listed as Data Deficient on the IUCN Red List, although it may be a synonym of Procambarus steigmani.
