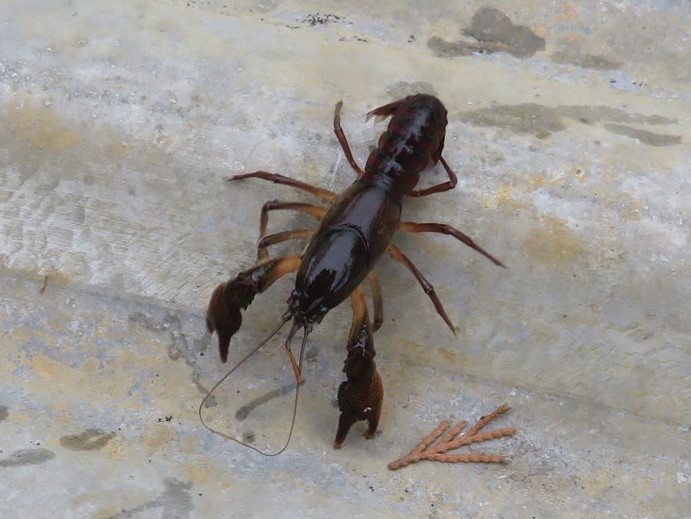

Conservation status
- Least Concern (IUCN 3.1)

Scientific classification
- Domain: Eukaryota
- Kingdom: Animalia
- Phylum: Arthropoda
- Class: Malacostraca
- Order: Decapoda
- Suborder: Pleocyemata
- Family: Cambaridae
- Genus: Procambarus
- Species: P. pygmaeus

Binomial name
- Procambarus pygmaeus Hobbs, 1942

= Procambarus pygmaeus =

Species of crayfish

Procambarus pygmaeus, commonly known as the Christmas tree crayfish, is a species of crayfish in the family Cambaridae. It is endemic to the south-eastern United States.
