= Procambarus natchitochae =

Conservation status
- Least Concern (IUCN 3.1)

Scientific classification
- Kingdom: Animalia
- Phylum: Arthropoda
- Class: Malacostraca
- Order: Decapoda
- Suborder: Pleocyemata
- Family: Cambaridae
- Genus: Procambarus
- Species: P. natchitochae

Binomial name
- Procambarus natchitochae Penn, 1953
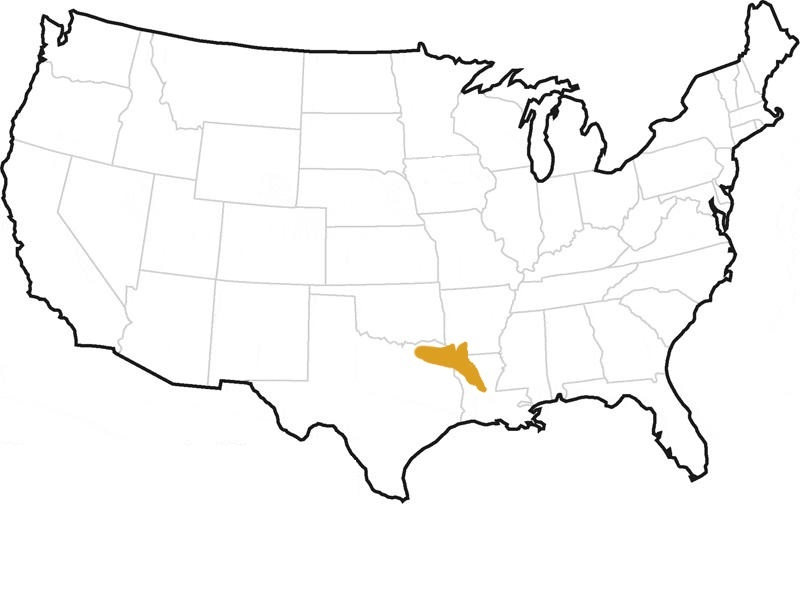

Species of crayfish

Procambarus natchitochae, the Red River crayfish, is a crayfish native to the Red River basin and Bayou Teche in Texas, Louisiana, and Arkansas. Its distribution is given by the IUCN here, whereas a slightly different Louisiana map is provided in the "Crawfishes of Louisiana", which excludes Bayou Teche P. natchitochae has a distribution of approximately 46,000 km^{2}.

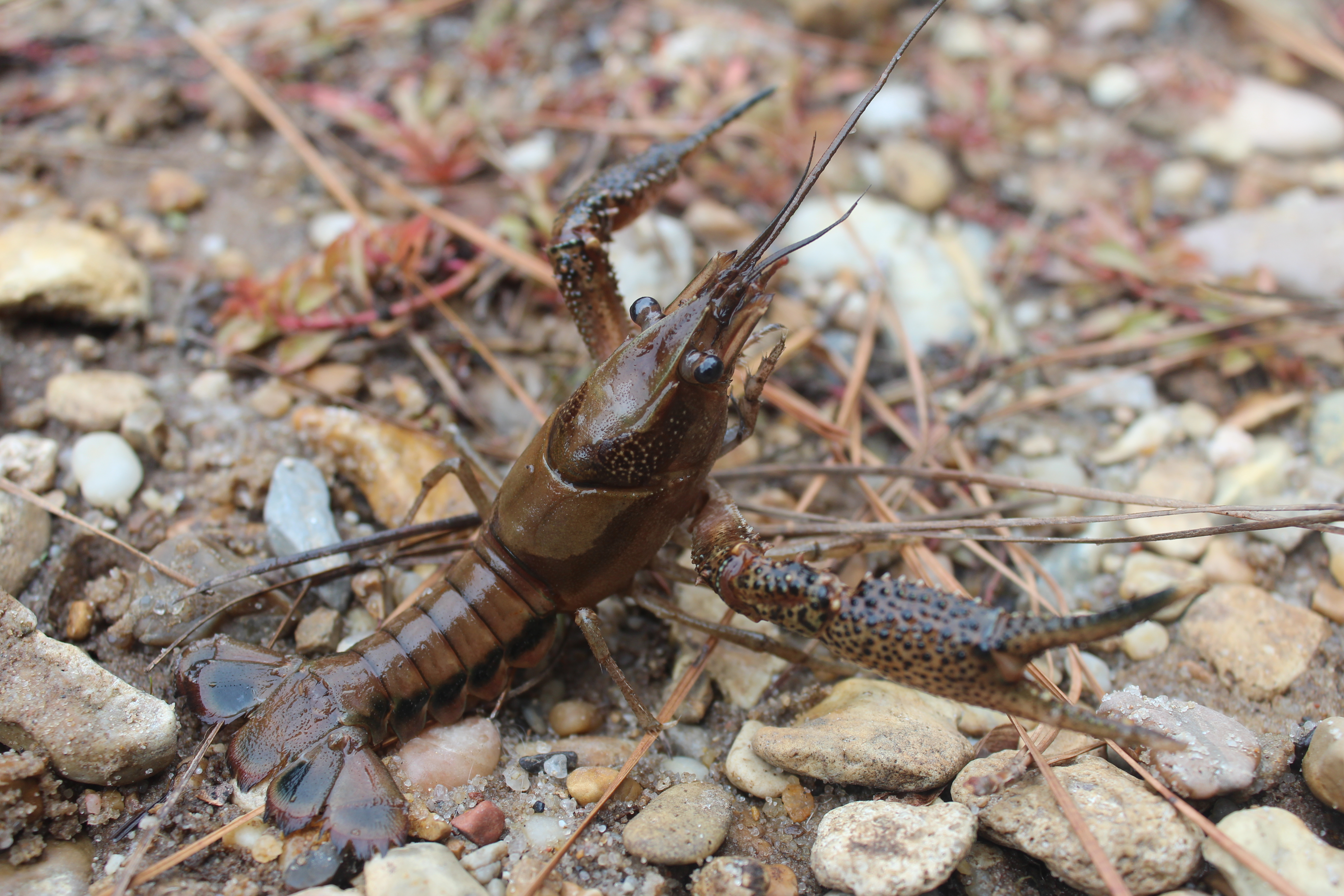
Nearly indistinguishable species Procambarus vioscai

== Identification ==
An individual crayfish can be identified to a group of a few species within the genus and subgenus Procambarus (Pennides) by looking at a few distinguishing characteristics. Two pairs of cervical spines, a broadly open areola, and lateral rostral spines are diagnostic physical features that characterize P. natchitochae, P. vioscai, P. dupratzi, and P. pentastylus from other species of crayfish. Color is not always a reliable characteristic in identification, but P. natchitochae (and the three other species above) generally have a dark brown saddle on the posterior part of the carapace and dark lateral stripes on the abdomen. Form I male gonopod characteristics or collection location are required for species level identification.

== Conservation status ==
Procambarus natchitochae live in streams and ditches with flowing current, clear to cloudy water, and rocky to sandy substrates. The species is endemic to the United States and is listed as a species of least concern by the IUCN.

NatureServe gives P. natchitochae a global rating of G5, or 'secure', and a national ranking of N5 for 'secure', while at the state level, Louisiana ranks it as S4, for 'Apparently secure', and Arkansas and Texas rate it as SNR, or 'State Not Ranked'. The American Fisheries Society ranks it as 'Currently Stable'. Conservation assessment is lacking for this species because there are little available data on the population or threats, other than the current species distribution.

== History ==
The P. natchitochae holotype, allotype, and morphotype were collected from a tributary of Spring Creek at Melder, on State Route 85, in Rapides Parish, Louisiana. The type specimens are currently housed at the National Museum of Natural History, Smithsonian Institution, Washington D.C. under catalog numbers 93649, 93650, 93651 (Male Form I, Female, Male Form II, respectively).
