= Procambarus gibbus =

Conservation status
- Data Deficient (IUCN 3.1)

- Vulnerable (NatureServe)

Scientific classification
- Kingdom: Animalia
- Phylum: Arthropoda
- Class: Malacostraca
- Order: Decapoda
- Suborder: Pleocyemata
- Family: Cambaridae
- Genus: Procambarus
- Species: P. gibbus

Binomial name
- Procambarus gibbus Hobbs, 1969

Species of crayfish

Procambarus gibbus, the Muckalee crayfish, is a species of crayfish in the family Cambaridae. It is endemic to the Flint River drainage in the U.S. state of Georgia. The common name of the species refers to the Muckalee Creek in Sumter County, Georgia, from where the first specimens were collected.

It is listed as Data Deficient on the IUCN Red List.
