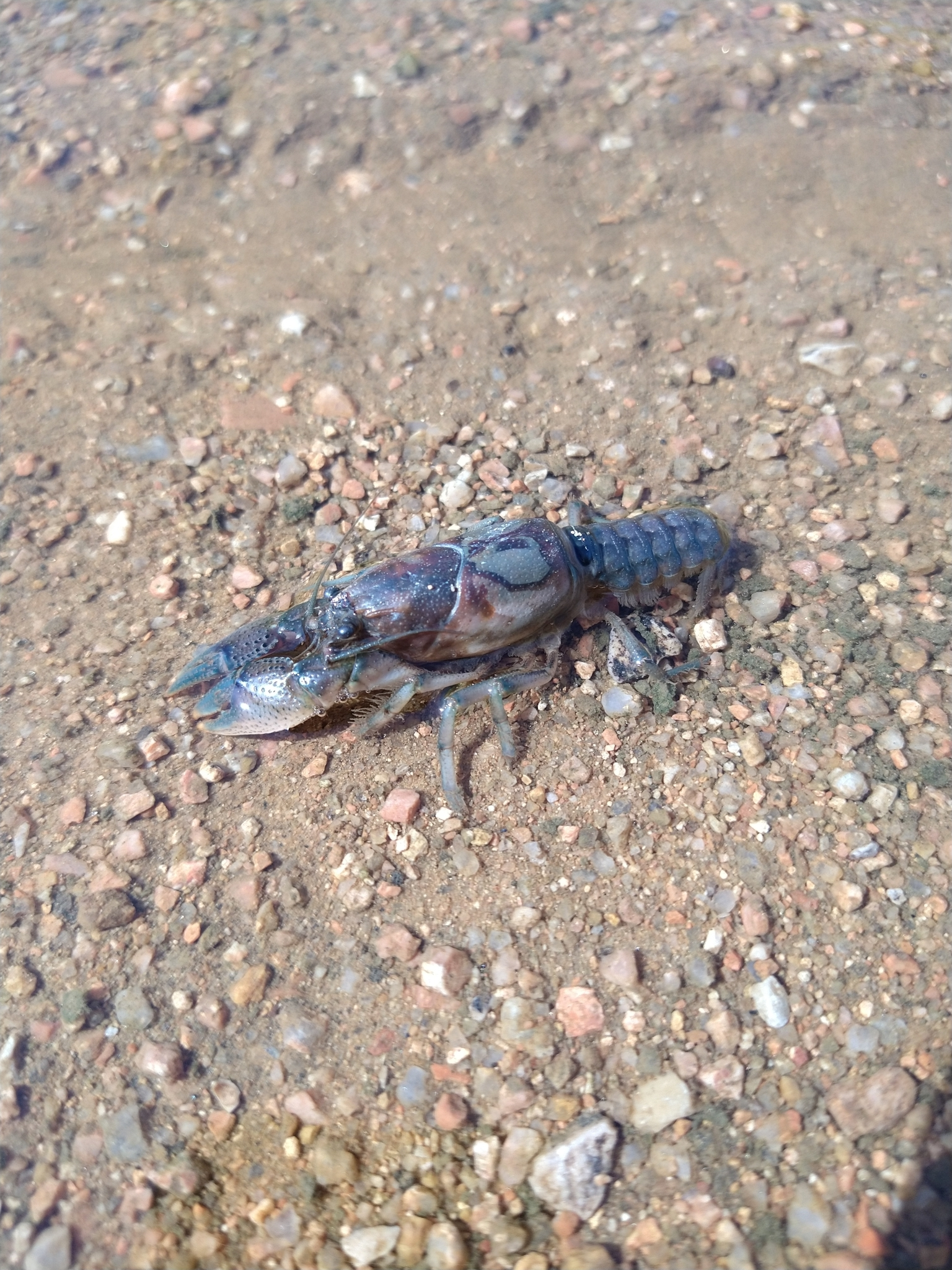

Conservation status
- Data Deficient (IUCN 3.1)

- Critically Imperiled (NatureServe)

Scientific classification
- Kingdom: Animalia
- Phylum: Arthropoda
- Class: Malacostraca
- Order: Decapoda
- Suborder: Pleocyemata
- Family: Cambaridae
- Genus: Procambarus
- Species: P. steigmani

Binomial name
- Procambarus steigmani Hobbs, 1991
- IUCN range Extant (resident)

= Procambarus steigmani =

Species of crayfish

Procambarus steigmani, sometimes called the Parkhill Prairie crayfish, is a species of crayfish in the family Cambaridae. It is endemic to Parkhill Prairie, in the Trinity River basin of Collin County, Texas, and is listed as Data Deficient on the IUCN Red List, although it may be a synonym of Procambarus regalis.
