= Procambarus nueces =

Conservation status
- Data Deficient (IUCN 3.1)

- Critically Imperiled (NatureServe)

Scientific classification
- Kingdom: Animalia
- Phylum: Arthropoda
- Clade: Pancrustacea
- Class: Malacostraca
- Order: Decapoda
- Suborder: Pleocyemata
- Family: Cambaridae
- Genus: Procambarus
- Species: P. nueces

Binomial name
- Procambarus nueces Hobbs & Hobbs III, 1995

Synonyms
- Procambarus (Ortmannicus) nueces Hobbs & Hobbs, 1995

Species of crayfish

Procambarus nueces, sometimes called the Nueces crayfish, is a species of crayfish in the family Cambaridae. It is endemic to the Atascosa River in Atascosa County, Texas. It was described from four individuals, and only two further individuals have been found since.
