= Procambarus echinatus =

Conservation status
- Least Concern (IUCN 3.1)

- Vulnerable (NatureServe)

Scientific classification
- Kingdom: Animalia
- Phylum: Arthropoda
- Clade: Pancrustacea
- Class: Malacostraca
- Order: Decapoda
- Suborder: Pleocyemata
- Family: Cambaridae
- Genus: Procambarus
- Species: P. echinatus

Binomial name
- Procambarus echinatus Hobbs, 1956

Species of crayfish

Procambarus echinatus, the Edisto crayfish, is a species of crayfish in the family Cambaridae. It is endemic to the drainages of the Salkehatchie River and the south fork of the eponymous Edisto River in South Carolina.
