= Lagniappe (disambiguation) =

A lagniappe a small gift given to a customer by a merchant at the time of a purchase.

Langniappe may also refer to:

- Lagniappe (newspaper), an alternative newspaper in Mobile, Alabama
- Lagniappe (album), a Hurricane Katrina benefit album by Saddle Creek records
- Procambarus lagniappe, a species of crayfish
- Lagniappe (yearbook), the student yearbook at Louisiana Tech
- "Lagniappe", a song by Michelle Shocked from the 2003 re-release of The Texas Campfire Tapes
- "Lagniappe for piano", a 1985 composition by Milton Babbitt
- Lagniappe Dulcimer Fete, an annual festival in Port Allen, Louisiana
