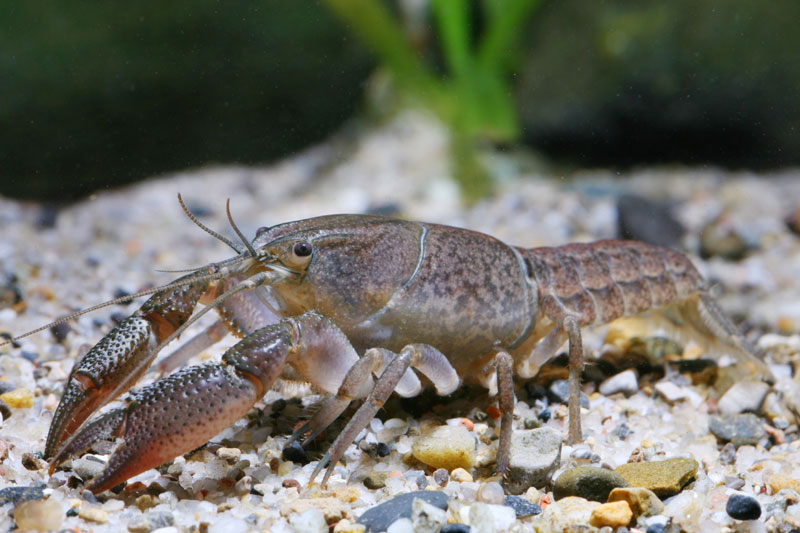

Conservation status
- Least Concern (IUCN 3.1)

Scientific classification
- Kingdom: Animalia
- Phylum: Arthropoda
- Clade: Pancrustacea
- Class: Malacostraca
- Order: Decapoda
- Suborder: Pleocyemata
- Family: Cambaridae
- Genus: Procambarus
- Species: P. fitzpatricki

Binomial name
- Procambarus fitzpatricki Hobbs, 1971

= Procambarus fitzpatricki =

Species of crayfish

Procambarus fitzpatricki, sometimes called the spinytail crayfish, is a species of crayfish in the family Cambaridae. It is endemic to southern Mississippi, between the Wolf River and the Pascagoula River, and is listed as a species of Least Concern on the IUCN Red List. It is the only species in the subgenus Procambarus (Acucauda).

== Life Cycle ==
=== Mating and Sperm Storage ===
Adult males Molt into a reproductively active Form I phase, developing enlargened pinchers (Chelae), hooks on their walking legs to grasp the female, and hardened copulatory organs (Gonopod)

When winter and spring rains flood Pine flatwoods and roadside ditches, crayfish emerge from their Burrow to mate in open water. The male flips the female onto her back and deposits a pack of sperm (Spermatophore) into a specialized receptacle on her backside called the Annulus ventralis, sealing it with a plug.

As surface water dries up in late spring and summer, females retreat into subterranean burrows dug down to the Water table, storing the sperm internally until conditions trigger Fertilisation.
