= Procambarus texanus =

Conservation status
- Data Deficient (IUCN 3.1)

- Critically Imperiled (NatureServe)

Scientific classification
- Kingdom: Animalia
- Phylum: Arthropoda
- Clade: Pancrustacea
- Class: Malacostraca
- Order: Decapoda
- Suborder: Pleocyemata
- Family: Cambaridae
- Genus: Procambarus
- Species: P. texanus

Binomial name
- Procambarus texanus Hobbs, 1971

Species of crayfish

Procambarus texanus (the "Bastrop crayfish") is a species of crayfish in the family Cambaridae. It is only known from a fish hatchery near Smithville, Bastrop County, Texas. and is listed as Data Deficient on the IUCN Red List.
