= Procambarus liberorum =

Conservation status
- Least Concern (IUCN 3.1)

Scientific classification
- Kingdom: Animalia
- Phylum: Arthropoda
- Class: Malacostraca
- Order: Decapoda
- Suborder: Pleocyemata
- Family: Cambaridae
- Genus: Procambarus
- Species: P. liberorum

Binomial name
- Procambarus liberorum Fitzpatrick, 1978

Synonyms
- Procambarus ferrugineus Hobbs & Robison, 1988

Species of crayfish

Procambarus liberorum is a species of crayfish in the family Cambaridae. It is endemic to the United States, where it occurs in Arkansas and Oklahoma. It is known commonly as the Osage burrowing crayfish.

== Distribution ==
In Arkansas, P. liberorum is found in the Boston Mountains, Ouachita Mountains, and Arkansas Valley, as far east as Lonoke County. It was discovered in Le Flore County, Oklahoma, in 2006.

== Taxonomic history ==
Procambarus liberorum was originally described from three specimens caught by a cat in Bentonville, Arkansas.

The species Procambarus ferrugineus was considered to be an endangered species on the IUCN Red List, but it is now known to be identical to the widespread and secure P. liberorum, which is listed as a least-concern species.
