= Procambarus escambiensis =

Conservation status
- Endangered (IUCN 3.1)

Scientific classification
- Kingdom: Animalia
- Phylum: Arthropoda
- Clade: Pancrustacea
- Class: Malacostraca
- Order: Decapoda
- Suborder: Pleocyemata
- Family: Cambaridae
- Genus: Procambarus
- Species: P. escambiensis

Binomial name
- Procambarus escambiensis Hobbs, 1942

Species of crayfish

Procambarus escambiensis, sometimes called the Escambia crayfish, is a species of crustacean in family Cambaridae. It is endemic to the Escambia River system in Alabama and Florida and is listed as an endangered species on the IUCN Red List. It was first described by carcinologist Horton H. Hobbs Jr. in 1942 from specimens collected near the Perdido River in Escambia County, Florida, and Flomaton, Alabama.
