= Procambarus nigrocinctus =

Conservation status
- Least Concern (IUCN 3.1)

- Critically Imperiled (NatureServe)

Scientific classification
- Kingdom: Animalia
- Phylum: Arthropoda
- Class: Malacostraca
- Order: Decapoda
- Suborder: Pleocyemata
- Family: Cambaridae
- Genus: Procambarus
- Species: P. nigrocinctus

Binomial name
- Procambarus nigrocinctus Hobbs, 1990

Species of crayfish

Procambarus nigrocinctus, the blackbelted crayfish, is a species of crayfish in the family Cambaridae. It is listed as a species of Least Concern on the IUCN Red List, because it is known from more than 100 sites across thirteen counties in Texas, where it is endemic to the Neches River system, and is common and widespread in a national park.
