= Procambarus delicatus =

Conservation status
- Critically endangered, possibly extinct (IUCN 3.1)

- Critically Imperiled (NatureServe)

Scientific classification
- Kingdom: Animalia
- Phylum: Arthropoda
- Clade: Pancrustacea
- Class: Malacostraca
- Order: Decapoda
- Suborder: Pleocyemata
- Family: Cambaridae
- Genus: Procambarus
- Species: P. delicatus

Binomial name
- Procambarus delicatus Hobbs & Franz, 1986

Species of crayfish

Procambarus delicatus, sometimes called the big-cheeked cave crayfish, is a species of crayfish in the family Cambaridae. It is endemic to a single spring in the Ocala National Forest, Lake County, Florida.

It is considered Critically Endangered (Possibly Extinct) by the IUCN Redlist, having not been seen since 1976.
