= Procambarus latipleurum =

Conservation status
- Data Deficient (IUCN 3.1)

Scientific classification
- Kingdom: Animalia
- Phylum: Arthropoda
- Clade: Pancrustacea
- Class: Malacostraca
- Order: Decapoda
- Suborder: Pleocyemata
- Family: Cambaridae
- Genus: Procambarus
- Species: P. latipleurum

Binomial name
- Procambarus latipleurum Hobbs, 1942

Species of crayfish

Procambarus latipleurum is a species of crayfish in the family Cambaridae. It is endemic to Gulf County, Florida, and is listed as Data Deficient on the IUCN Red List.
