= Procambarus pictus =

Conservation status
- Near Threatened (IUCN 3.1)

Scientific classification
- Kingdom: Animalia
- Phylum: Arthropoda
- Clade: Pancrustacea
- Class: Malacostraca
- Order: Decapoda
- Suborder: Pleocyemata
- Family: Cambaridae
- Genus: Procambarus
- Species: P. pictus

Binomial name
- Procambarus pictus (Hobbs, 1940)

Species of crayfish

Procambarus pictus, sometimes called the Black Creek crayfish or spotted royal crayfish, is a species of crayfish in family Cambaridae. It is endemic to Florida, where it is found in the Black Creek river system, the St. Johns River, and the upper Etoniah Creek.

== Appearance ==
This species of crayfish has yellow to white stripes and spots on a black carapace, with its abdomen consisting of black and rust colored bands.
