= Procambarus rathbunae =

Conservation status
- Data Deficient (IUCN 3.1)

Scientific classification
- Kingdom: Animalia
- Phylum: Arthropoda
- Class: Malacostraca
- Order: Decapoda
- Suborder: Pleocyemata
- Family: Cambaridae
- Genus: Procambarus
- Species: P. rathbunae

Binomial name
- Procambarus rathbunae (Hobbs, 1940)

Species of crayfish

Procambarus rathbunae is a species of crayfish in family Cambaridae. It is endemic to Okaloosa County and Walton County, Florida, and is listed as Data Deficient on the IUCN Red List.
