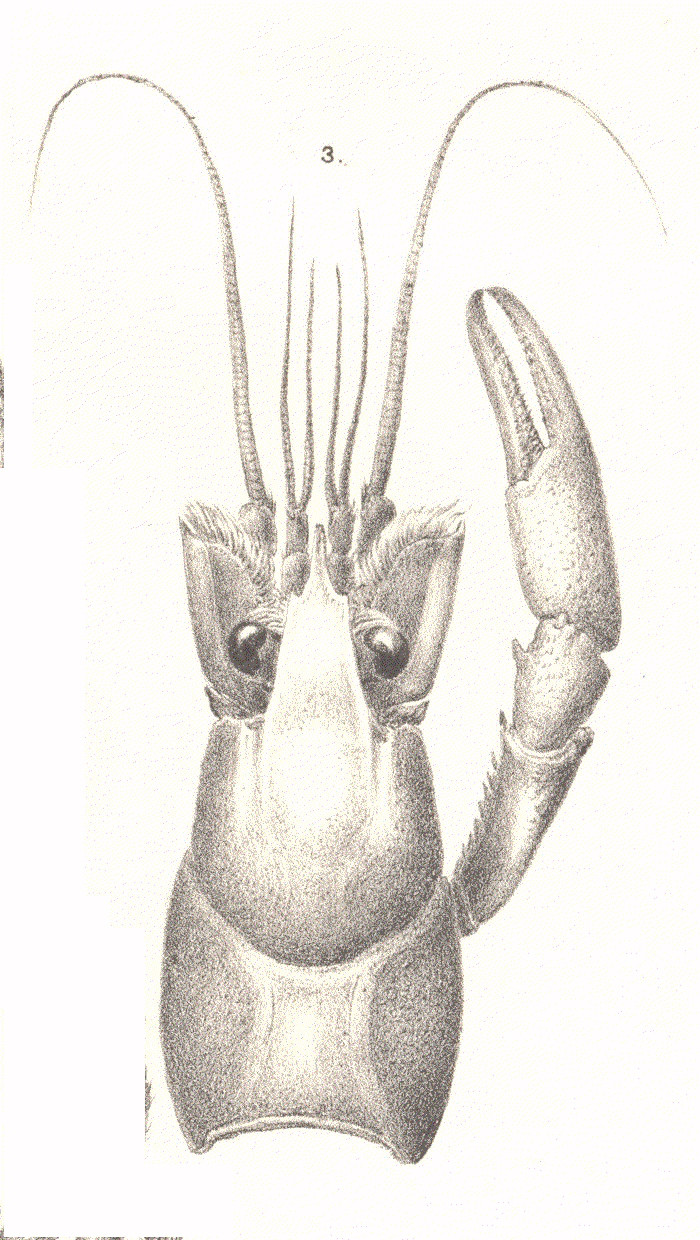

Conservation status
- Data Deficient (IUCN 3.1)

- Apparently Secure (NatureServe)

Scientific classification
- Kingdom: Animalia
- Phylum: Arthropoda
- Class: Malacostraca
- Order: Decapoda
- Suborder: Pleocyemata
- Family: Cambaridae
- Genus: Procambarus
- Species: P. pubescens

Binomial name
- Procambarus pubescens Faxon, 1884

Synonyms
- Cambarus pubescens

= Procambarus pubescens =

Species of crayfish

Procambarus pubescens, the brushnose crayfish, is a species of freshwater crayfish native to Georgia and South Carolina in the United States.
