= Procambarus lucifugus =

Florida cave crayfish

Conservation status
- Least Concern (IUCN 3.1)

- Critically Imperiled (NatureServe)

Scientific classification
- Kingdom: Animalia
- Phylum: Arthropoda
- Class: Malacostraca
- Order: Decapoda
- Suborder: Pleocyemata
- Family: Cambaridae
- Genus: Procambarus
- Species: P. lucifugus

Binomial name
- Procambarus lucifugus (Hobbs, 1940)

Species of crayfish

Procambarus lucifugus, the Florida cave crayfish, vampire crayfish, or light-fleeing cave crayfish, is a troglomorphic freshwater crayfish endemic to 20–25 occurrences (likely more) in an arc of caves 80 km long in 6 Florida counties.

There are two sub-species described;

- Procambarus lucifugus lucifugus
- Procambarus lucifugus alachua

The two sub-species are known to form intergrades in the range where they overlap.
