= Procambarus angustatus =

Conservation status
- Extinct (1958) (IUCN 3.1)

- Presumed Extinct (1958) (NatureServe)

Scientific classification
- Kingdom: Animalia
- Phylum: Arthropoda
- Clade: Pancrustacea
- Class: Malacostraca
- Order: Decapoda
- Suborder: Pleocyemata
- Family: Cambaridae
- Genus: Procambarus
- Species: †P. angustatus

Binomial name
- †Procambarus angustatus (LeConte, 1856)

Synonyms
- Astacus angustatus LeConte, 1856

Species of crayfish

Procambarus angustatus was a species of crayfish in the family Cambaridae. It was only known from the type specimen, described by John Lawrence LeConte in 1856. He reported that it "lives in lesser Georgia, in the rivulets of pure water which flow between little sand hills". It was endemic to the U. S. state of Georgia, but is now believed to be extinct.
