= Procambarus horsti =

Conservation status
- Endangered (IUCN 3.1)

Scientific classification
- Kingdom: Animalia
- Phylum: Arthropoda
- Clade: Pancrustacea
- Class: Malacostraca
- Order: Decapoda
- Suborder: Pleocyemata
- Family: Cambaridae
- Genus: Procambarus
- Species: P. horsti

Binomial name
- Procambarus horsti Hobbs & Means, 1972

Species of crayfish

Procambarus horsti, known as the Big Blue Spring crayfish or Big Blue Spring cave crayfish, is a species of crayfish in the family Cambaridae. It is endemic to subterranean springs in Jefferson County and Leon County, Florida.
