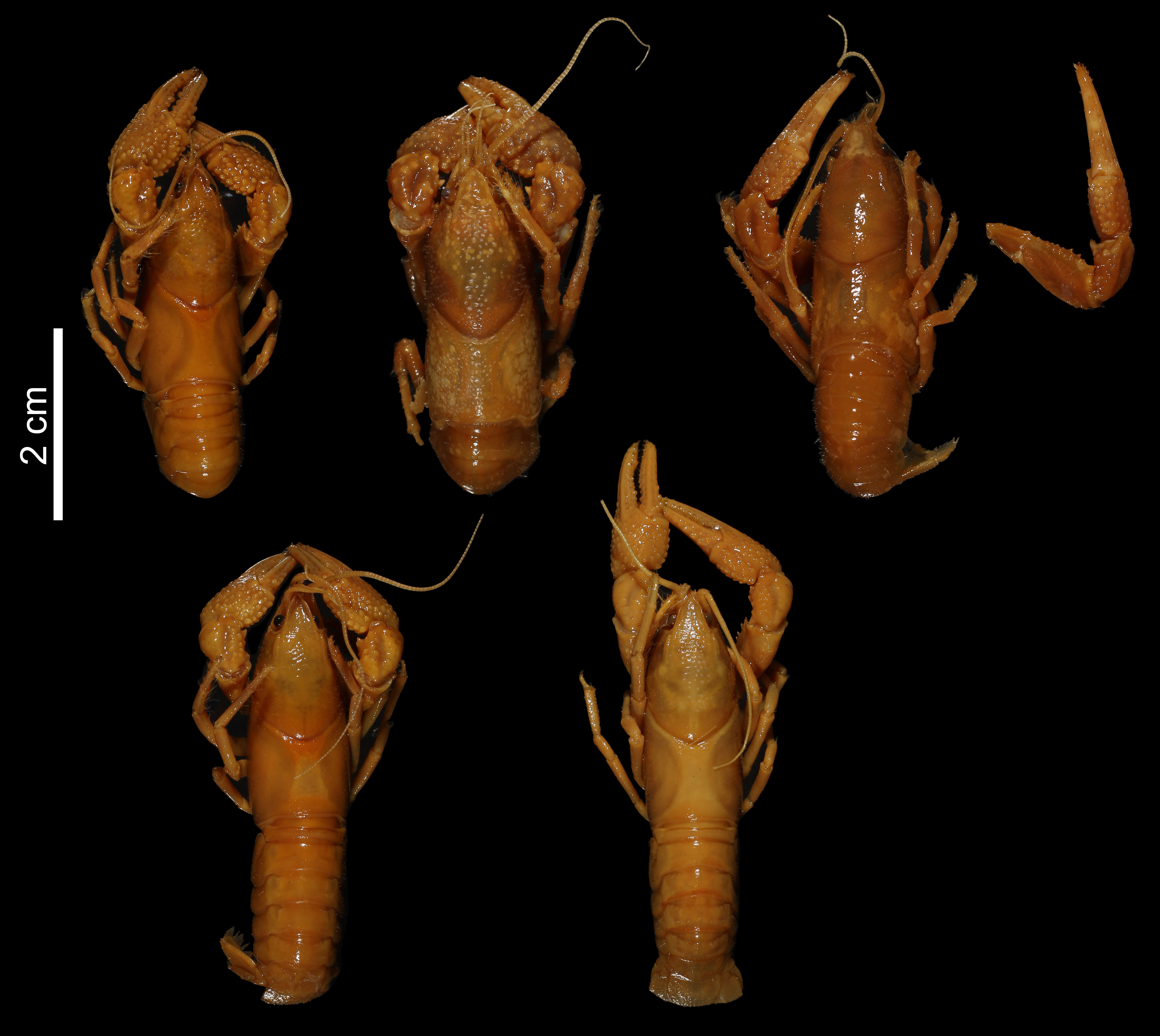

Conservation status
- Critically endangered, possibly extinct (IUCN 3.1)

Scientific classification
- Kingdom: Animalia
- Phylum: Arthropoda
- Class: Malacostraca
- Order: Decapoda
- Suborder: Pleocyemata
- Family: Cambaridae
- Genus: Procambarus
- Species: P. paradoxus

Binomial name
- Procambarus paradoxus (Ortmann, 1906)

Synonyms
- Cambarus paradoxus Ortmann, 1906

= Procambarus paradoxus =

Species of crustacean

Procambarus paradoxus is a species of freshwater crayfish in the family Cambaridae and is found in Puebla, Mexico.
