= Procambarus morrisi =

Conservation status
- Critically Endangered (IUCN 3.1)

- Critically Imperiled (NatureServe)

Scientific classification
- Kingdom: Animalia
- Phylum: Arthropoda
- Clade: Pancrustacea
- Class: Malacostraca
- Order: Decapoda
- Suborder: Pleocyemata
- Family: Cambaridae
- Genus: Procambarus
- Species: P. morrisi

Binomial name
- Procambarus morrisi Hobbs & Franz, 1991

Species of crayfish

Procambarus morrisi, the Putnam County cave crayfish, is a species of crayfish in the family Cambaridae. It is only known from the type locality, at the Devil's Sink, west of Interlachen, Putnam County, Florida, and is listed as critically endangered on the IUCN Red List.
