= Procambarus apalachicolae =

Conservation status
- Endangered (IUCN 3.1)

- Imperiled (NatureServe)

Scientific classification
- Kingdom: Animalia
- Phylum: Arthropoda
- Clade: Pancrustacea
- Class: Malacostraca
- Order: Decapoda
- Suborder: Pleocyemata
- Family: Cambaridae
- Genus: Procambarus
- Species: P. apalachicolae

Binomial name
- Procambarus apalachicolae Hobbs, 1942

Species of crayfish

Procambarus apalachicolae, the coastal flatwoods crayfish, is a species of crayfish in family Cambaridae. It is endemic to Florida, and is listed as an endangered species on the IUCN Red List.
