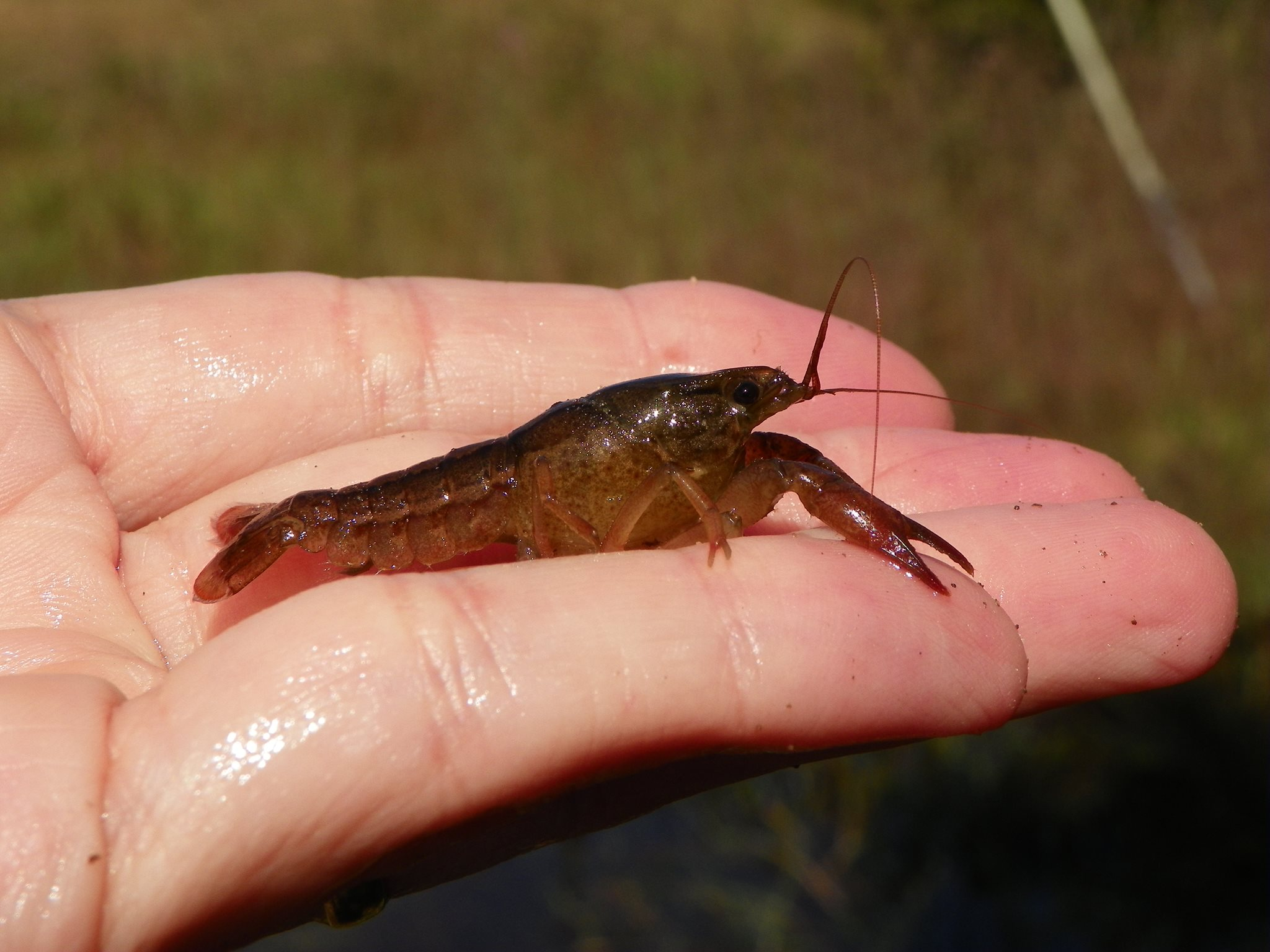

Conservation status
- Endangered (IUCN 3.1)

- Threatened (ESA)

Scientific classification
- Kingdom: Animalia
- Phylum: Arthropoda
- Clade: Pancrustacea
- Class: Malacostraca
- Order: Decapoda
- Suborder: Pleocyemata
- Family: Cambaridae
- Genus: Procambarus
- Species: P. econfinae

Binomial name
- Procambarus econfinae Hobbs, 1942

= Procambarus econfinae =

Species of crayfish

Procambarus econfinae, sometimes called the Panama City crayfish, is a species of crayfish in the family Cambaridae. It is only found around Panama City, Florida, and is listed as an endangered species on the IUCN Red List. It has been listed as a threatened species under the Endangered Species Act of 1973 since February 2022.
