= Procambarus pogum =

Conservation status
- Data Deficient (IUCN 3.1)

Scientific classification
- Kingdom: Animalia
- Phylum: Arthropoda
- Class: Malacostraca
- Order: Decapoda
- Suborder: Pleocyemata
- Family: Cambaridae
- Genus: Procambarus
- Species: P. pogum

Binomial name
- Procambarus pogum Fitzpatrick, 1978

Species of crayfish

Procambarus pogum, the bearded crayfish or bearded red crayfish, is a species of crayfish in the family Cambaridae. It is endemic to the Houlka–Tibbie Creek basin in Chickasaw County and Oktibbeha County, Mississippi, and is listed as Data Deficient on the IUCN Red List, having only been recorded once since its original description.
