= Procambarus cometes =

Conservation status
- Endangered (IUCN 3.1)

Scientific classification
- Kingdom: Animalia
- Phylum: Arthropoda
- Clade: Pancrustacea
- Class: Malacostraca
- Order: Decapoda
- Suborder: Pleocyemata
- Family: Cambaridae
- Genus: Procambarus
- Species: P. cometes

Binomial name
- Procambarus cometes Fitzpatrick, 1978

Species of crayfish

Procambarus cometes, the Mississippi flatwoods crayfish is a species of crayfish in the family Cambaridae. It is endemic to Lowndes County and Oktibbeha County, Mississippi, and is listed as an endangered species on the IUCN Red List.
