= Procambarus barbiger =

Conservation status
- Data Deficient (IUCN 3.1)

- Imperiled (NatureServe)

Scientific classification
- Kingdom: Animalia
- Phylum: Arthropoda
- Class: Malacostraca
- Order: Decapoda
- Suborder: Pleocyemata
- Family: Cambaridae
- Genus: Procambarus
- Species: P. barbiger

Binomial name
- Procambarus barbiger Fitzpatrick, 1978

Species of crayfish

Procambarus barbiger, known as the Jackson prairie crayfish, is a species of crayfish in the family Cambaridae. It is endemic to Jackson Prairie in Newton County, Scott County, Jasper County, Smith County and Rankin County, Mississippi.
