= Procambarus franzi =

Conservation status
- Endangered (IUCN 3.1)

Scientific classification
- Kingdom: Animalia
- Phylum: Arthropoda
- Clade: Pancrustacea
- Class: Malacostraca
- Order: Decapoda
- Suborder: Pleocyemata
- Family: Cambaridae
- Genus: Procambarus
- Species: P. franzi

Binomial name
- Procambarus franzi Hobbs & Lee, 1976

Species of crayfish

Procambarus franzi, the Orange Lake cave crayfish, is a species of crayfish in the family Cambaridae. It is endemic to two caves in Marion County, Florida,
