= Procambarus connus =

Conservation status
- Data Deficient (IUCN 3.1)

Scientific classification
- Kingdom: Animalia
- Phylum: Arthropoda
- Class: Malacostraca
- Order: Decapoda
- Suborder: Pleocyemata
- Family: Cambaridae
- Genus: Procambarus
- Species: P. connus

Binomial name
- Procambarus connus Fitzpatrick, 1978

Species of crayfish

Procambarus connus, the Carrollton crayfish, is a species of crayfish in the family Cambaridae. It is endemic to the area around Carrollton, in Carroll County, Mississippi. It is listed as Data Deficient on the IUCN Red List.
