= Procambarus orcinus =

Conservation status
- Endangered (IUCN 3.1)

Scientific classification
- Kingdom: Animalia
- Phylum: Arthropoda
- Clade: Pancrustacea
- Class: Malacostraca
- Order: Decapoda
- Suborder: Pleocyemata
- Family: Cambaridae
- Genus: Procambarus
- Species: P. orcinus

Binomial name
- Procambarus orcinus Hobbs & Means, 1972

Species of crayfish

Procambarus orcinus, known as the Woodville Karst cave crayfish, is a species of crayfish in the family Cambaridae. It is endemic to the Woodville Karst Plain in the United States. This species has been reported from eight solutional caves in southern Leon County as well as six caves in Wakulla County, Florida.
