= Procambarus milleri =

Conservation status
- Endangered (IUCN 3.1)

- Critically Imperiled (NatureServe)

Scientific classification
- Kingdom: Animalia
- Phylum: Arthropoda
- Clade: Pancrustacea
- Class: Malacostraca
- Order: Decapoda
- Suborder: Pleocyemata
- Family: Cambaridae
- Genus: Procambarus
- Species: P. milleri

Binomial name
- Procambarus milleri Hobbs, 1971

Species of crayfish

Procambarus milleri, the Miami cave crayfish is a species of crayfish in the family Cambaridae. It is endemic to Florida, where it is known from 14 to 15 sites in Miami-Dade County, and is listed as an endangered species on the IUCN Red List.

An aquarium strain has been selectively bred to achieve an orange colour. This is known as the Mandarin crayfish, Tangerine crayfish or Mandarinenkrebs in German. It is the only stygobiotic crayfish known to breed in captivity.

== Gallery ==
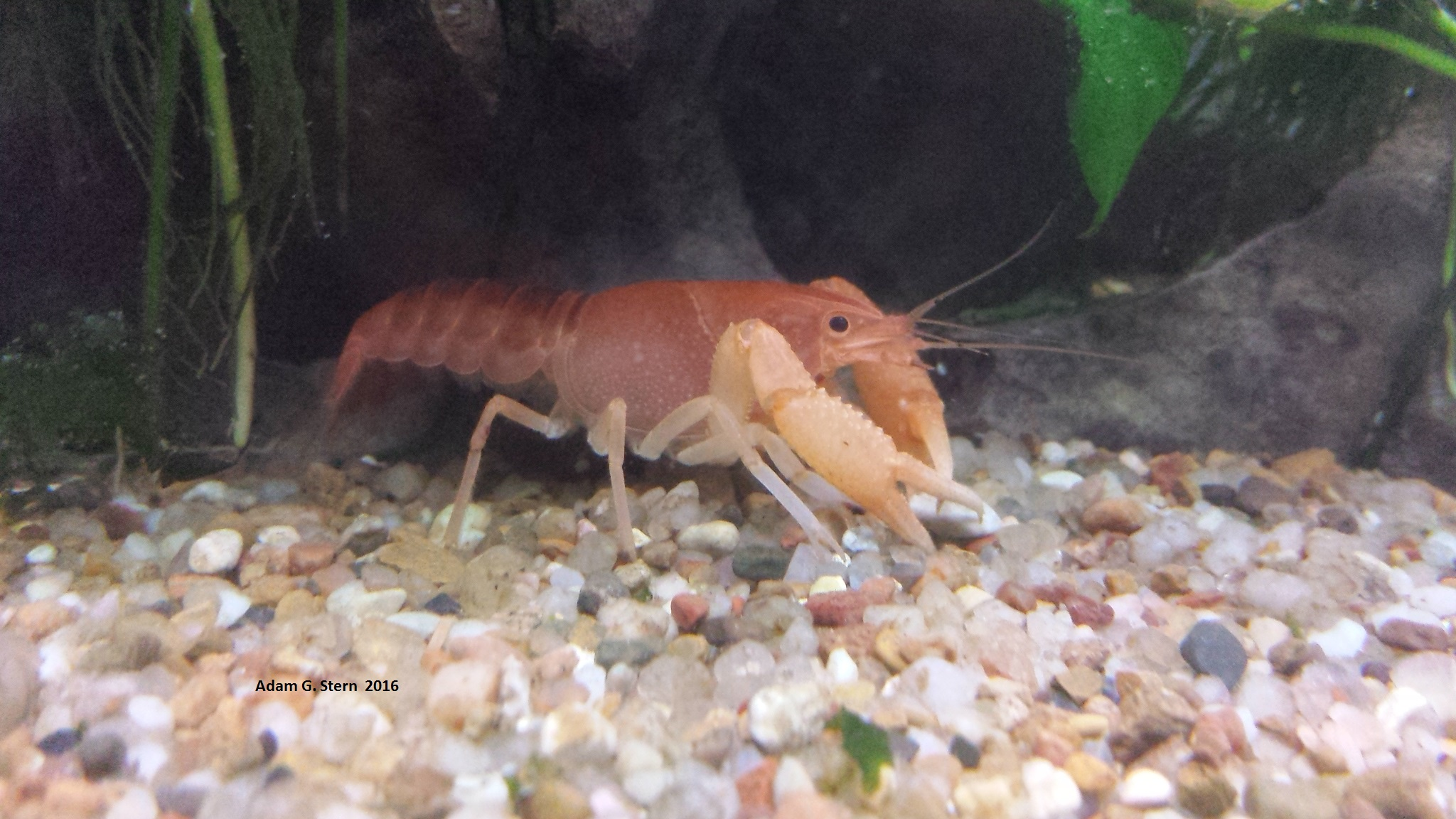
Aquarium strain, eating

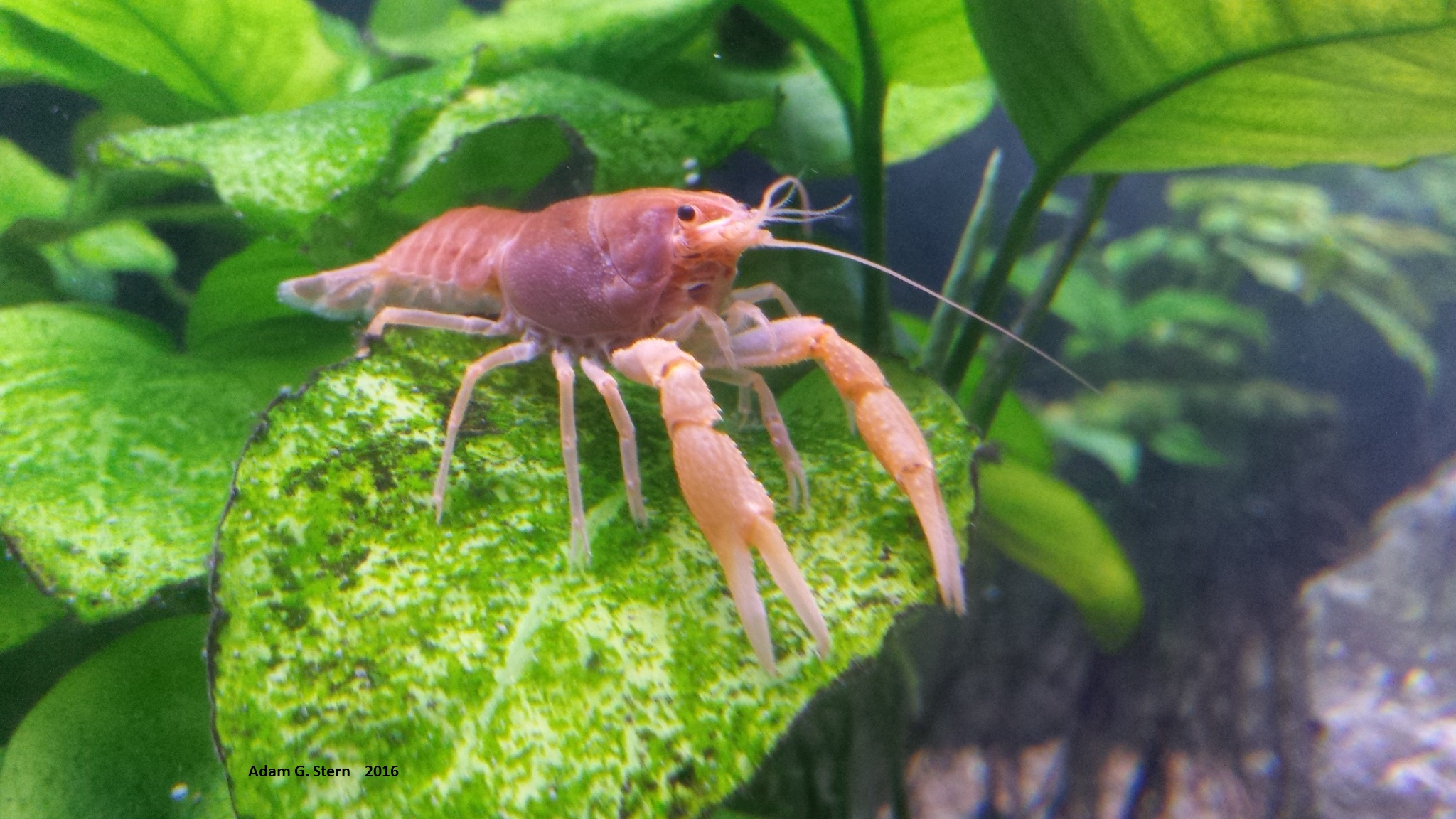
On an aquarium plant

Media related to Procambarus milleri at Wikimedia Commons
