= Spinytail crayfish =

Spinytail crayfish may refer to:

- Procambarus fitzpatricki
- Cambarus acanthura
