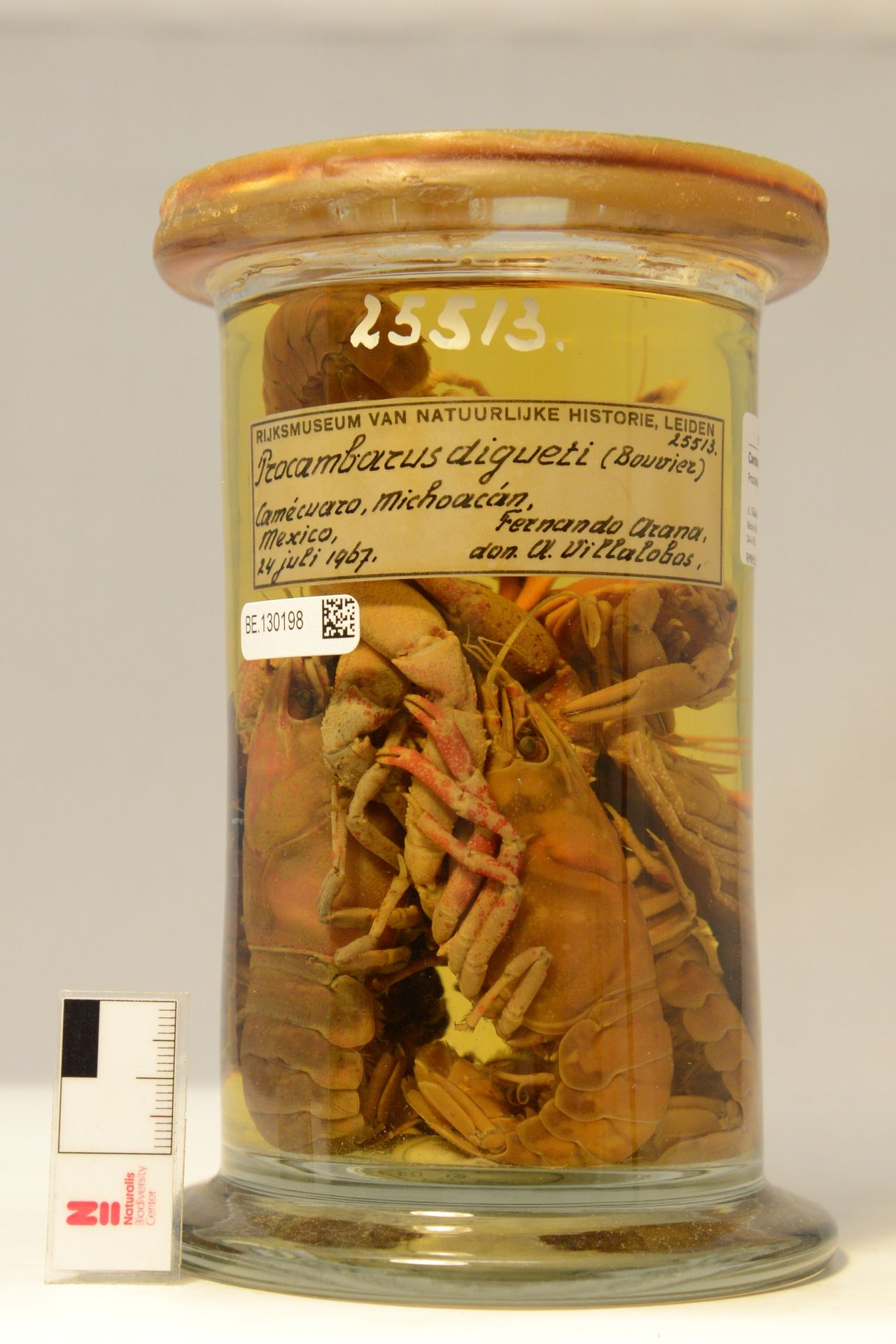
- Zoological specimens

Conservation status
- Endangered (IUCN 3.1)

Scientific classification
- Kingdom: Animalia
- Phylum: Arthropoda
- Clade: Pancrustacea
- Class: Malacostraca
- Order: Decapoda
- Suborder: Pleocyemata
- Family: Cambaridae
- Genus: Procambarus
- Species: P. digueti

Binomial name
- Procambarus digueti (Bouvier, 1897)

= Procambarus digueti =

Species of crayfish

Procambarus digueti is a species of fresh water crayfish in the genus Procambarus and in the family Cambaridae. It is endemic to tropical regions in the Pacific Coast of Mexico. It lives in shallow lakes where oxygen is plentiful and are the only decapod species in Mexico to live in waters 1,800 meters above sea level. P. digueti is believed to be one of the oldest species of Mexican crayfish due to its unusually low genetic variability between organisms and geographical evidence. It has experienced a greater amount of habitat loss than other crayfish species have in Mexico, leading to a decline in its populations and the IUCN Red List to deem it as an endangered species.
