= Procambarus attiguus =

Conservation status
- Critically Endangered (IUCN 3.1)

- Critically Imperiled (NatureServe)

Scientific classification
- Kingdom: Animalia
- Phylum: Arthropoda
- Clade: Pancrustacea
- Class: Malacostraca
- Order: Decapoda
- Suborder: Pleocyemata
- Family: Cambaridae
- Genus: Procambarus
- Species: P. attiguus

Binomial name
- Procambarus attiguus Hobbs & Franz, 1992

Species of crayfish

Procambarus attiguus, known as the Silver Glen Springs cave crayfish, is a species of crayfish in the family Cambaridae. It is endemic to Silver Glen Springs, Marion County, Florida, and is listed as critically endangered on the IUCN Red List.
