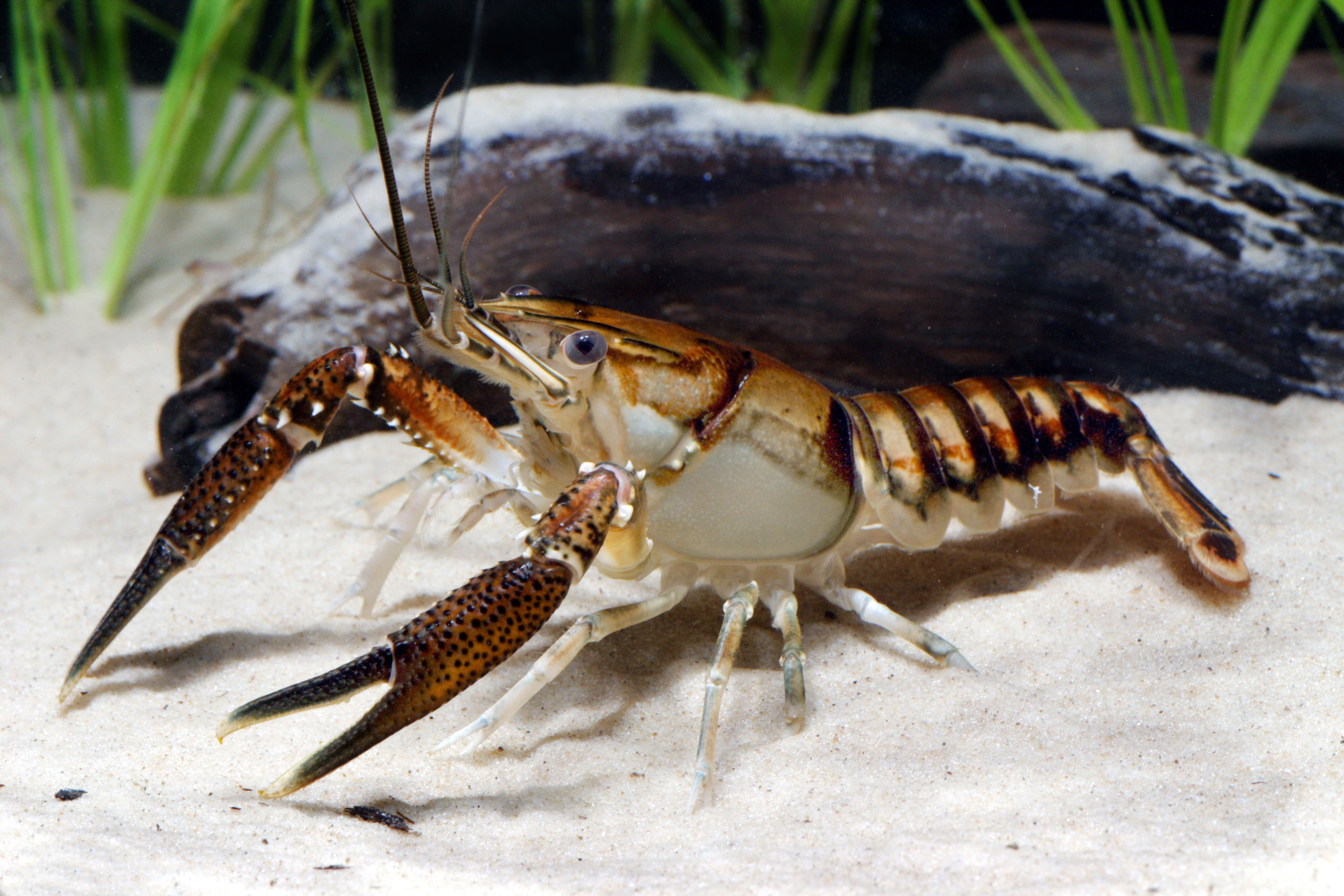

Conservation status
- Near Threatened (IUCN 3.1)

- Imperiled (NatureServe)

Scientific classification
- Kingdom: Animalia
- Phylum: Arthropoda
- Clade: Pancrustacea
- Class: Malacostraca
- Order: Decapoda
- Suborder: Pleocyemata
- Family: Cambaridae
- Genus: Procambarus
- Species: P. lagniappe

Binomial name
- Procambarus lagniappe (Black, 1968)

= Procambarus lagniappe =

Species of crayfish

Procambarus lagniappe, the Lagniappe crayfish, is a species of crayfish in the family Cambaridae. It is endemic to Alabama and Mississippi, and is listed as Near Threatened on the IUCN Red List. The species is associated with streams and was originally recorded from tributaries of the Tombigbee River in Kemper County, Mississippi.
