= Procambarus acherontis =

Conservation status
- Endangered (IUCN 3.1)

- Critically Imperiled (NatureServe)

Scientific classification
- Kingdom: Animalia
- Phylum: Arthropoda
- Clade: Pancrustacea
- Class: Malacostraca
- Order: Decapoda
- Suborder: Pleocyemata
- Family: Cambaridae
- Genus: Procambarus
- Species: P. acherontis

Binomial name
- Procambarus acherontis (Lönnberg, 1894)

Species of crayfish

Procambarus acherontis, the Orlando cave crayfish, is a species of crayfish in the family Cambaridae. It is endemic to Orange County and Seminole County, Florida, and is listed as an endangered species on the IUCN Red List.
