= Procambarus leitheuseri =

Conservation status
- Endangered (IUCN 3.1)

Scientific classification
- Kingdom: Animalia
- Phylum: Arthropoda
- Clade: Pancrustacea
- Class: Malacostraca
- Order: Decapoda
- Suborder: Pleocyemata
- Family: Cambaridae
- Genus: Procambarus
- Species: P. leitheuseri

Binomial name
- Procambarus leitheuseri Franz & Hobbs, 1983

Species of crayfish

Procambarus leitheuseri, sometimes called the Coastal Lowland cave crayfish, is a species of troglobite crayfish in the family Cambaridae. It is endemic to Hernando and Pasco counties, Florida and is listed as an endangered species on the IUCN Red List.
