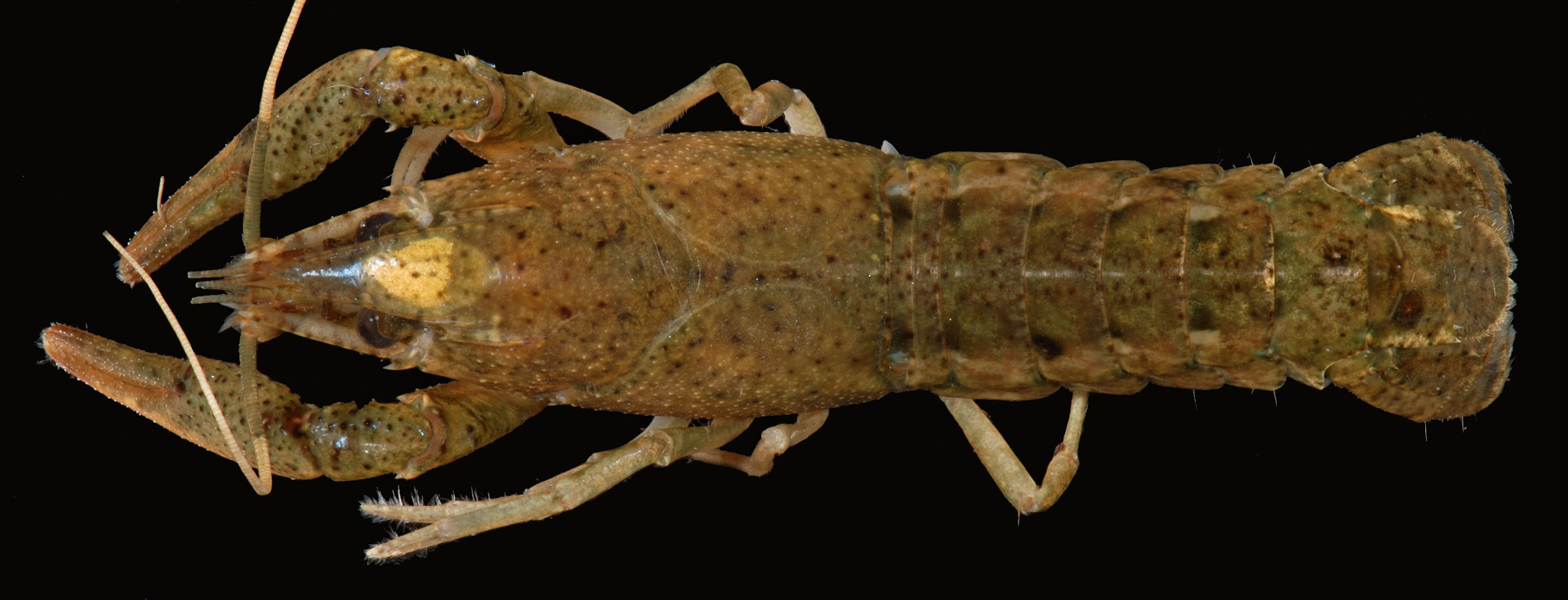

Conservation status
- Least Concern (IUCN 3.1)

- Secure (NatureServe)

Scientific classification
- Kingdom: Animalia
- Phylum: Arthropoda
- Clade: Pancrustacea
- Class: Malacostraca
- Order: Decapoda
- Suborder: Pleocyemata
- Family: Cambaridae
- Genus: Procambarus
- Species: P. acutus

Binomial name
- Procambarus acutus (Girard, 1852)

= Procambarus acutus =

Species of crayfish

Procambarus acutus, the white river crayfish, is a species of crayfish in the family Cambaridae. It is found in North America and Europe.

The IUCN conservation status of Procambarus acutus is "LC", least concern, with no immediate threat to the species' survival. The IUCN status was reviewed in 2010.

== Subspecies ==
These two subspecies belong to the species Procambarus acutus:

- Procambarus acutus acutus (Girard, 1852) (white river crayfish)
- Procambarus acutus cuevachicae (Hobbs, 1941)

== Distribution ==
=== Native ===
Procambarus acutus is native to parts of the United States. It has a disjunct native distribution which includes the Atlantic Slope, as well as the southern Great Lakes drainages to the Gulf of Mexico. On the Atlantic Slope, P. acutus occurs from Maine to Georgia into Canada. Procambarus acutus also occurs from southern Wisconsin and Michigan through Kentucky and Missouri to western Texas and the Florida panhandle.

=== Introduced ===
Procambarus acutus has spread beyond the American states it is native to and is now found in most of the Continental US.

These crayfish are also found in Egypt, Great Britain, and the Netherlands however there is insufficient information at this time to assess their degree of establishment or invasiveness. Invasion is possible.

The species was first located in Belgium in 2019. Specifically, the subspecies P. a. acutus was found. This sighting in East Flanders makes it the fourth confirmed location outside of the US. Although it has become established elsewhere, and is potentially invasive in East Flanders, it is not yet certain that it is invading or even established in that location.
