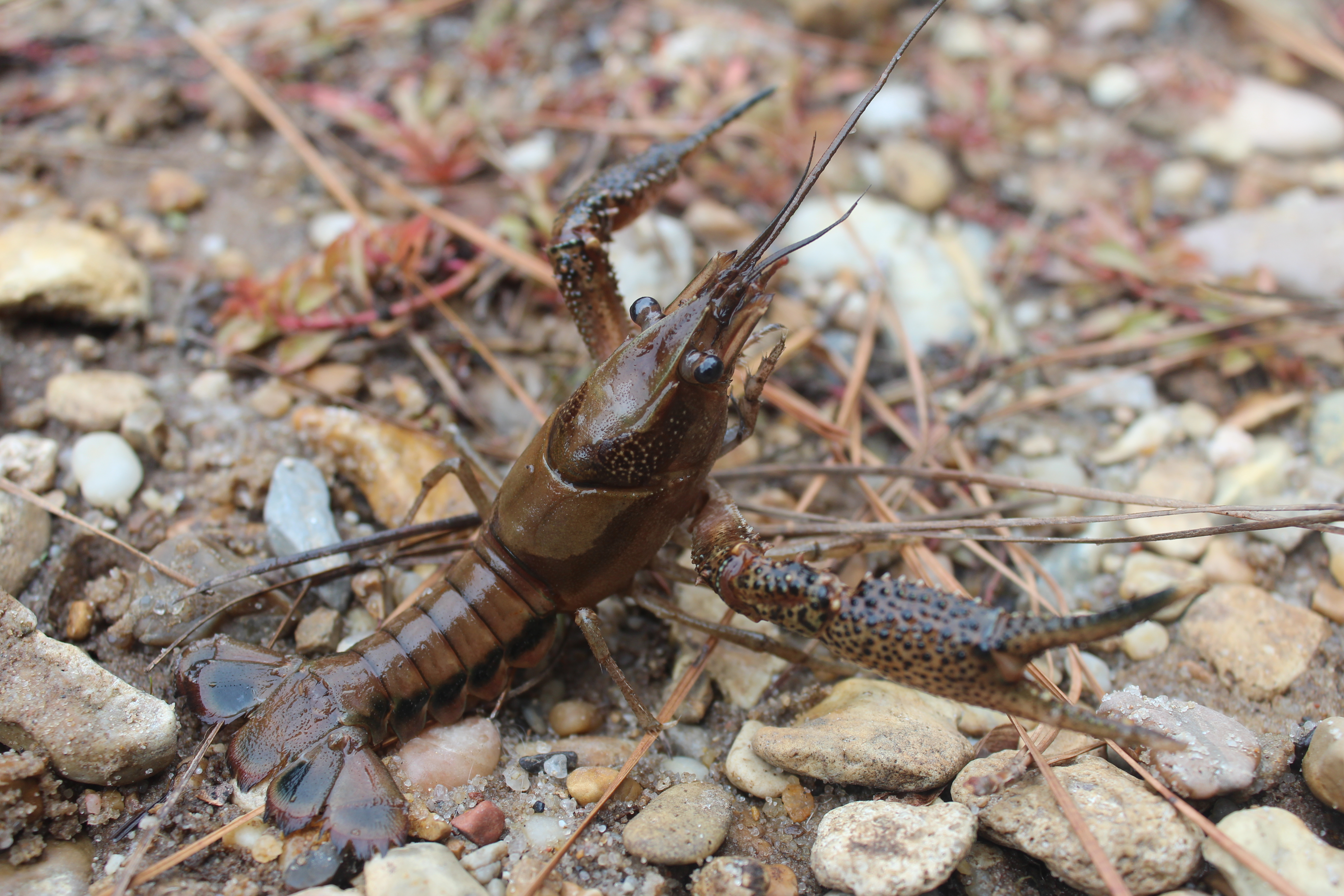

Conservation status
- Least Concern (IUCN 3.1)

Scientific classification
- Kingdom: Animalia
- Phylum: Arthropoda
- Class: Malacostraca
- Order: Decapoda
- Suborder: Pleocyemata
- Family: Cambaridae
- Genus: Procambarus
- Species: P. vioscai

Binomial name
- Procambarus vioscai Penn, 1946

= Procambarus vioscai =

Species of crayfish

Procambarus vioscai is a species of crayfish found in United States.

== Subspecies ==
- Procambarus vioscai paynei JF Fitzpatrick Jr 1990 - east of Mississippi River.
