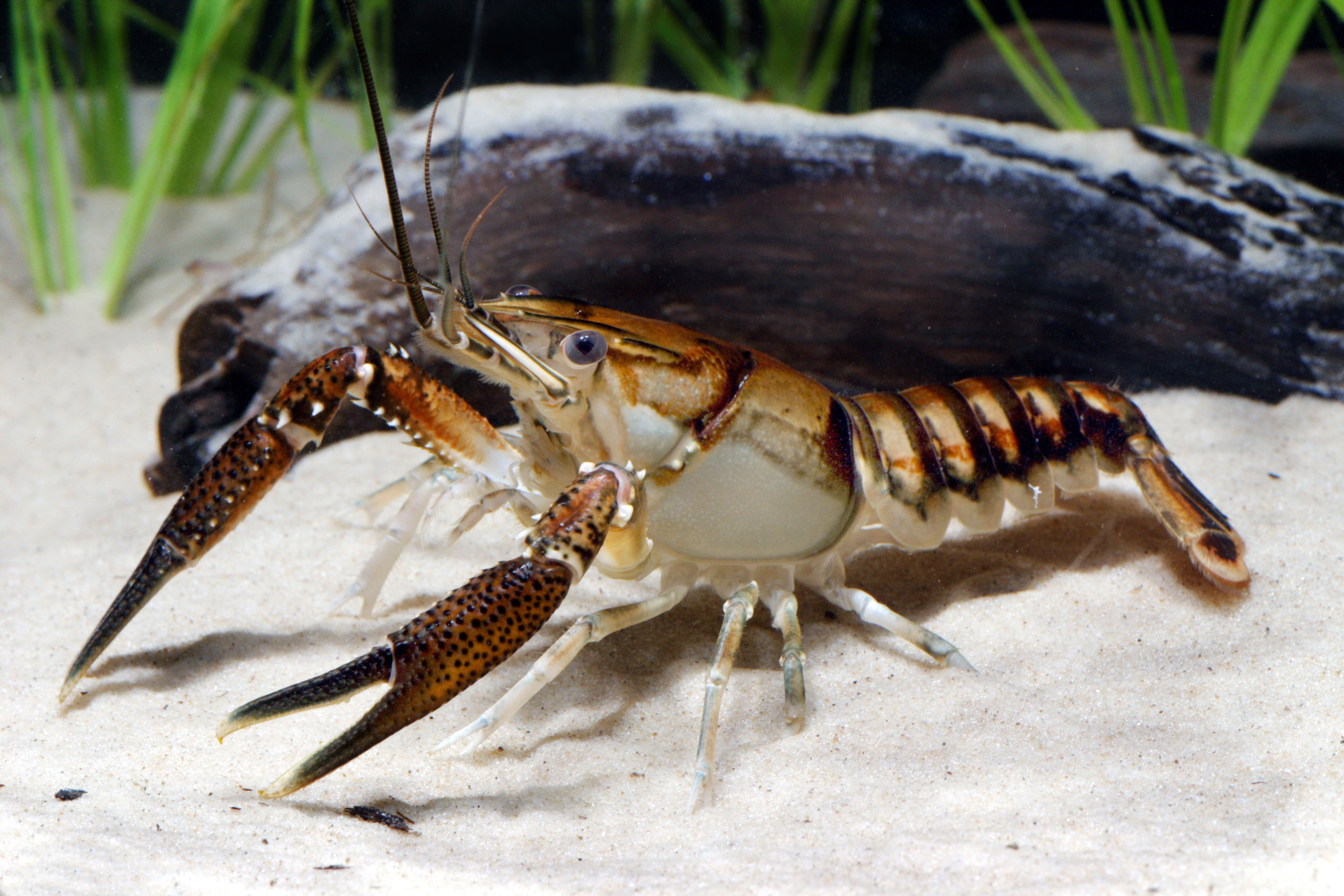
- Procambarus lagniappe

Scientific classification
- Kingdom: Animalia
- Phylum: Arthropoda
- Clade: Pancrustacea
- Class: Malacostraca
- Order: Decapoda
- Suborder: Pleocyemata
- Family: Cambaridae
- Genus: Procambarus; Ortmann, 1905

Type species
- Procambarus digueti (Bouvier, 1897)

Synonyms
- List: Cambarus (Girardiella) Lyle, 1938; Cambarus (Ortmannicus) Fowler, 1912; Cambarus (Paracambarus) Ortmann, 1906; Cambarus (Procambarus) Ortmann, 1905; Paracambarus Ortmann, 1906; Procambarus (Acucauda) Hobbs, 1972; Procambarus (Austrocambarus) Hobbs, 1972; Procambarus (Capillicambarus) Hobbs, 1972; Procambarus (Girardiella) Lyle, 1938; Procambarus (Hagenides) Hobbs, 1972; Procambarus (Leconticambarus) Hobbs, 1972; Procambarus (Lonnbergius) Hobbs, 1972; Procambarus (Mexicambarus) Hobbs, 1972; Procambarus (Ortmannicus) Fowler, Procambarus (Pennides) Hobbs, 1972; Procambarus (Remoticambarus) Hobbs, 1972; Procambarus (Scapulicambarus) Hobbs, 1972; Procambarus (Villalobosus) Hobbs, 1972

= Procambarus =

Procambarus Temporal range: Early Eocene to present

Genus of crayfishes

Procambarus is a genus of crayfish in the family Cambaridae, all native to North and Central America. It includes a number of troglobitic species, and the marbled crayfish (marmorkrebs), which is parthenogenetic. Originally described as a subgenus for four species, it now contains around 161 species.

== Biogeography ==
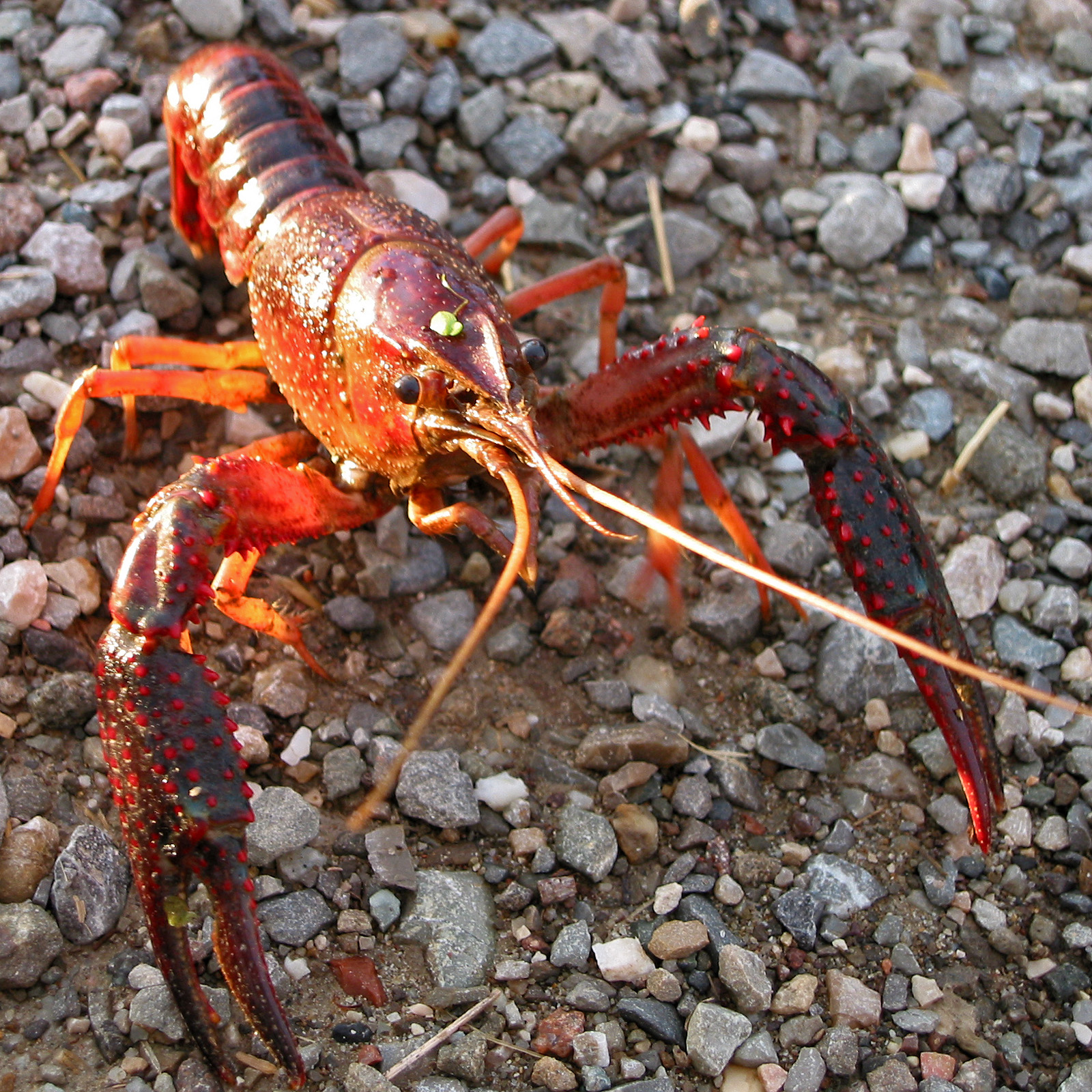
The well-known and widespread Procambarus clarkii

The majority of the diversity is found in the southeastern United States, but the genus extends as far south as Guatemala and Honduras, and on the Caribbean island of Cuba. After United States, the highest diversity is in Mexico with about 45 species. Only two are native to Guatemala (P. pilosimanus and P. williamsoni), one to Belize (P. pilosimanus), one to Honduras (P. williamsoni) and three to Cuba (P. atkinsoni, P. cubensis and P. niveus).

Subgenus Ortmannicus was the most widespread, with the range of Procambarus acutus extending as far north as the Great Lakes and New England, as well as south into northeastern Mexico; the subgenus Girardella also extended from the Great Lakes to Mexico, but was distributed further west than Ortmannicus. Scapulicambarus and Pennides were widespread in the southeastern United States, further west (Texas and Louisiana) than Leconticambarus which was centered on Florida and neighbouring states. The subgenus Austrocambarus had the most southerly distribution, being found in Cuba and parts of Central America from Mexico to Belize, Guatemala and Honduras. The other subgenera are more restricted in their distributions, including three endemic to central Mexico, and six endemic to small areas in the United States.

A few species of Procambarus have been introduced to regions outside their native range, both in North America and other continents. They are frequently categorized as invasive species, representing a threat to natives, including rarer crayfish species.

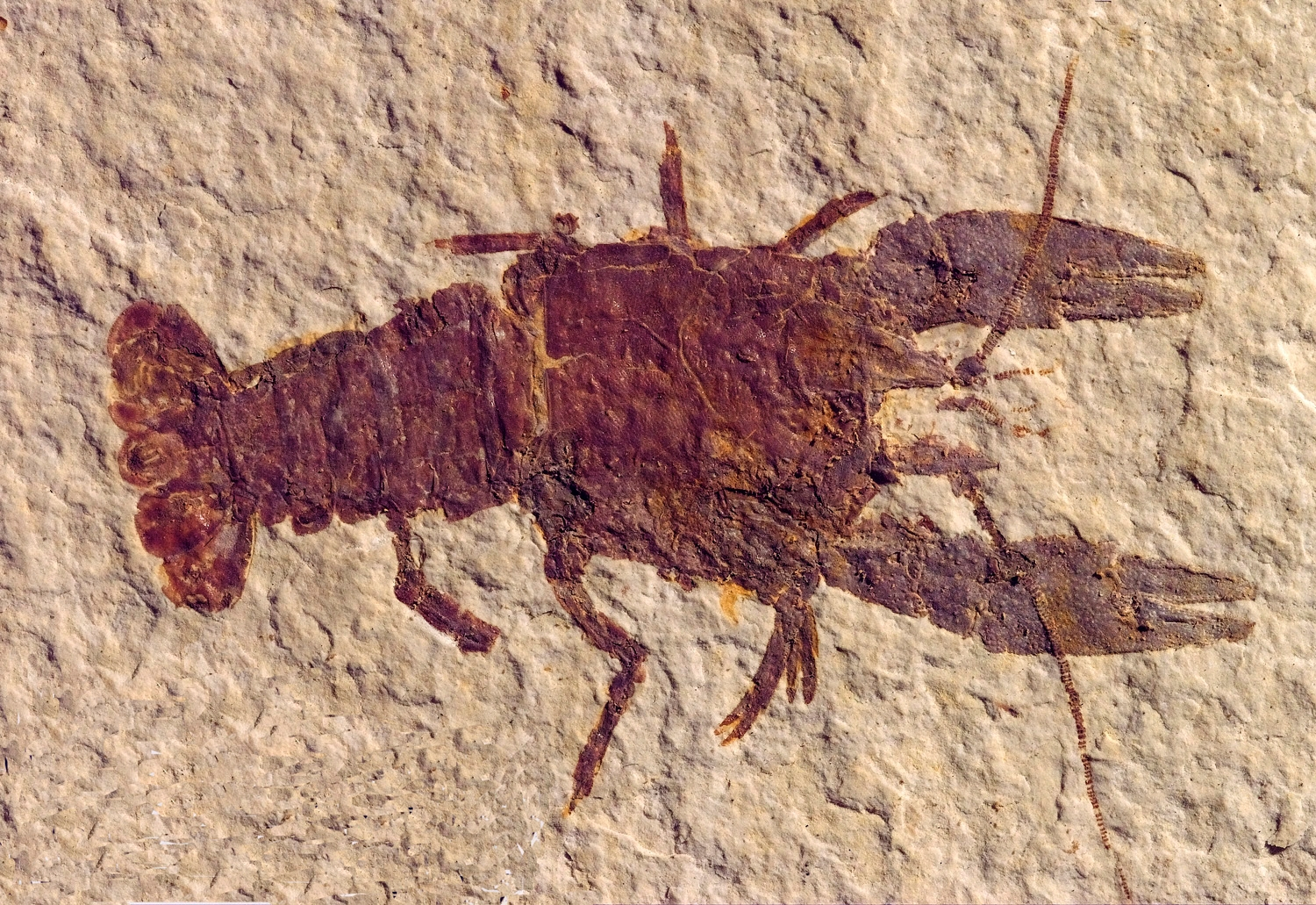
Procambarus primaevus from Fossil Butte, the earliest known fossil member of the genus

The earliest known fossil member of the genus is Procambarus primaevus, known from the Early Eocene-aged deposits of Fossil Butte in the Green River Formation in Wyoming, USA. This suggests that during the Eocene, Procambarus was found as far west as the Intermountain West of the United States, where it is no longer present today.

== Description ==
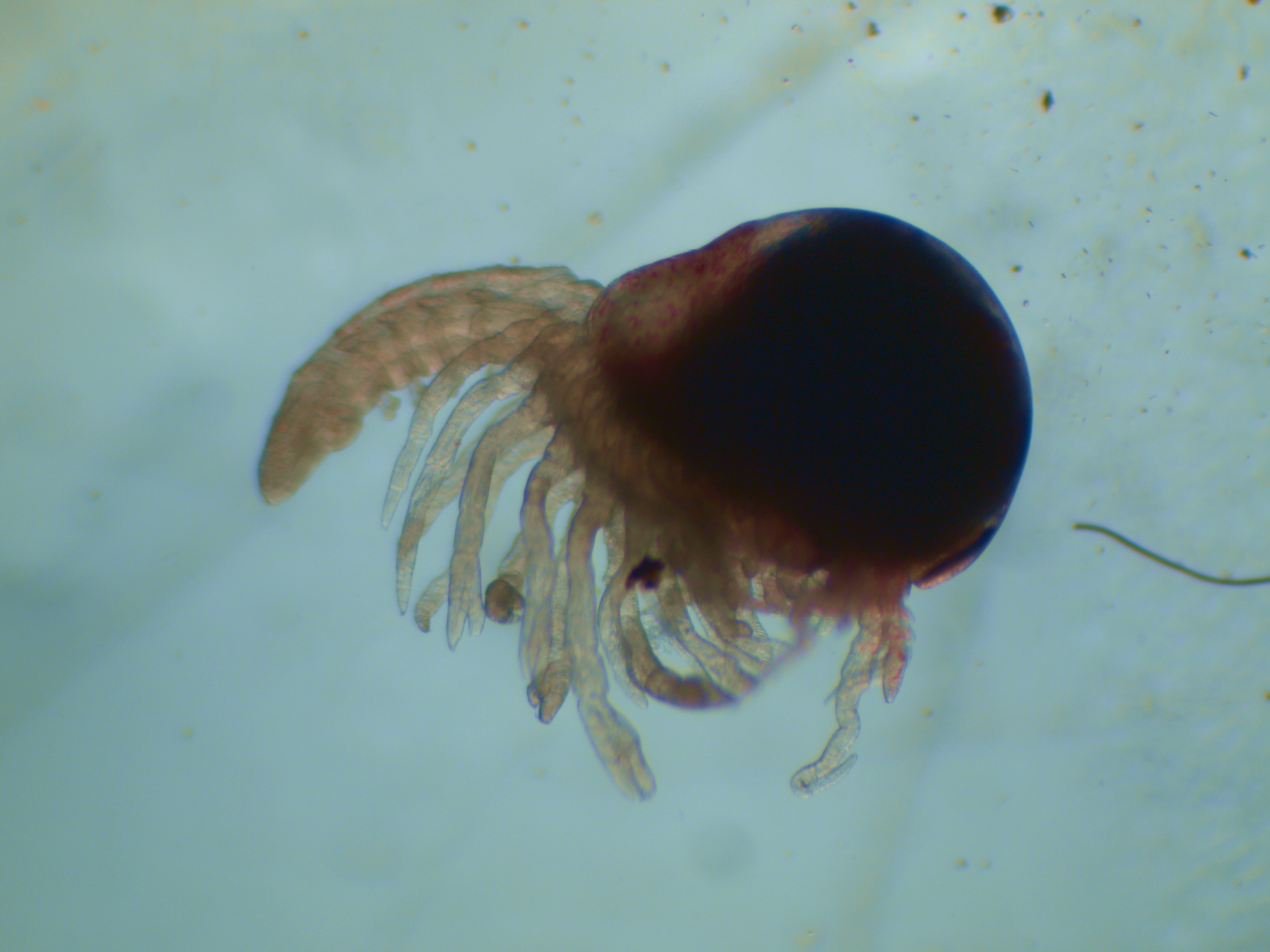
Larva

Procambarus can be distinguished from other genera of crayfish by the form of the first pleopod in males, which typically has three or more processes at the tip, compared to two or fewer in Faxonius and Cambarus.

== Ecology ==
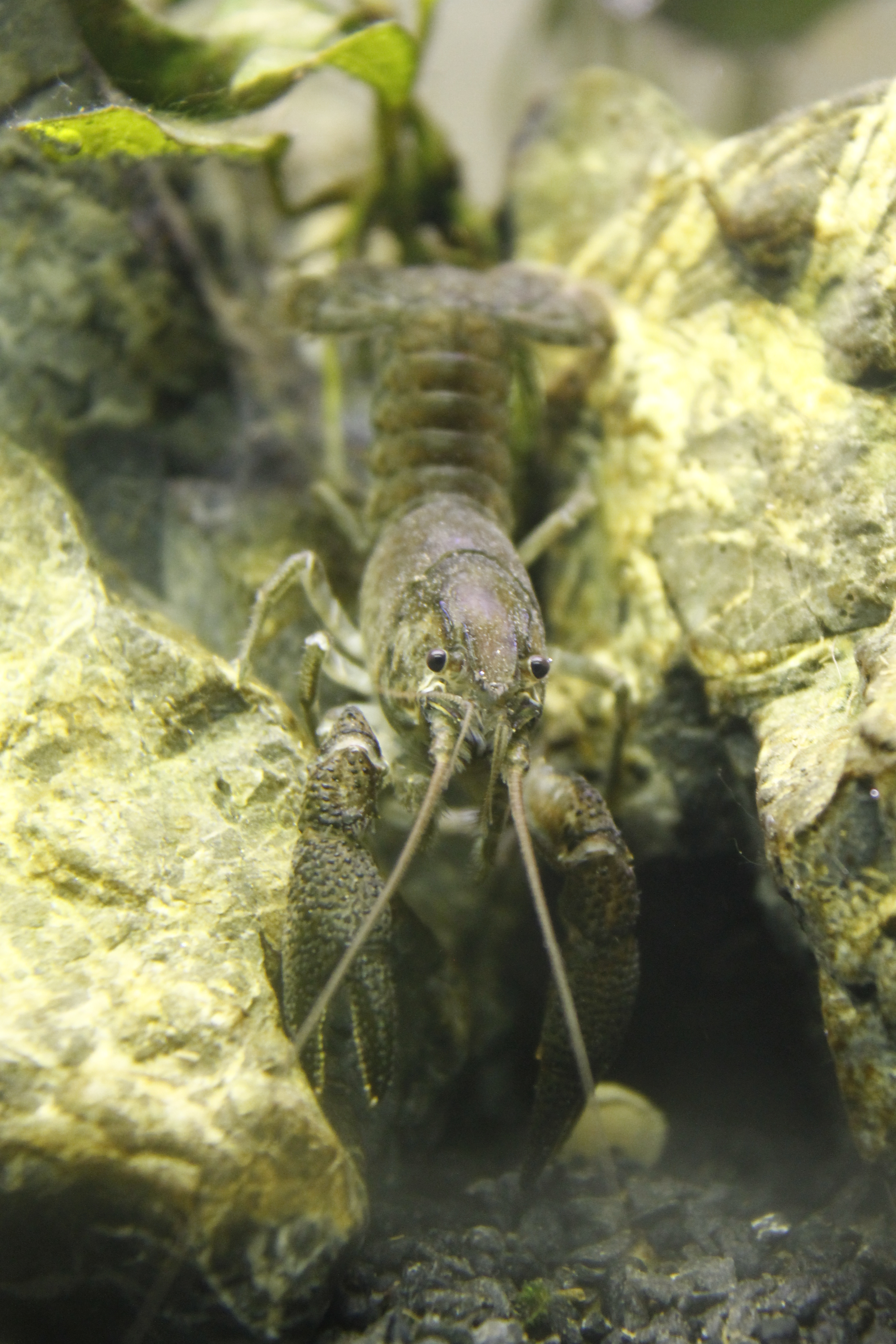
Procambarus vazquezae is found only in Laguna Catemaco in Mexico

Most Procambarus species live in various above-ground waters such as rivers, streams, lakes, ponds and swamps, but several are troglobitic, living in caves, particularly in karstic areas. In the United States, these include both species in subgenus Lonnbergius (P. acherontis and P. morrisi). Other cave-dwellers in the United States with various levels of troglomorphic adaptions are P. attiguus, P. erythrops, P. franzi, P. leitheuseri, P. lucifugus, P. milleri and P. orcinus, but these are all members of subgenera that also include species from above-ground waters. In Cuba, P. niveus is a cave-dweller. In Mexico, many species have been recorded in caves, but most of these have also been recorded from above-ground waters; only P. cavernicola, P. oaxacae, P. rodriguezi and P. xilitlae are strict cave-dwellers and troglomorphic. In 2007, troglomorphic specimens of P. clarkii were found in caves in Portugal and Italy.

== Taxonomy ==
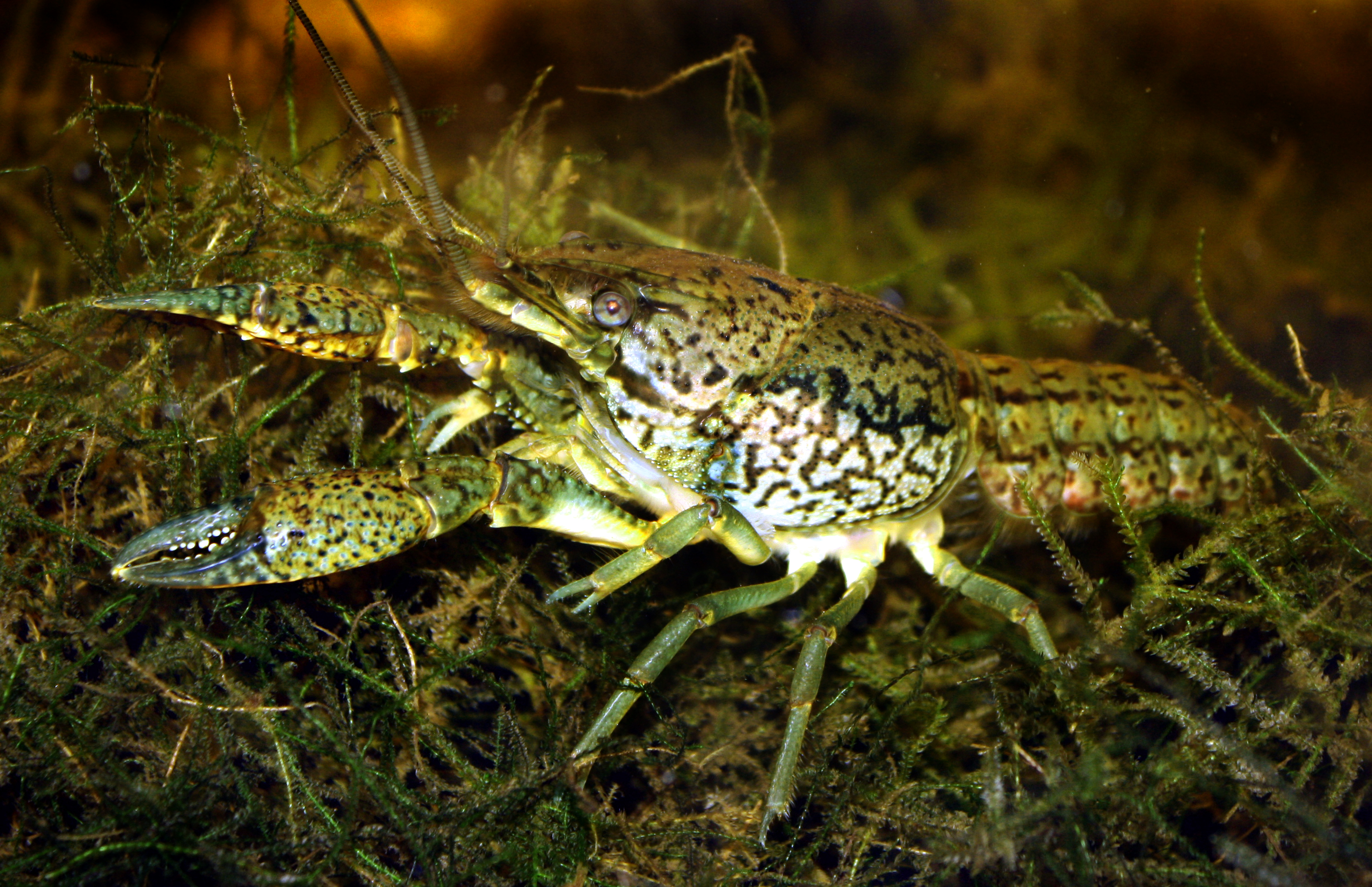
The marbled crayfish (marmorkrebs) is parthenogenetic

Procambarus was originally described by Arnold Edward Ortmann in 1905 as a subgenus of a wider genus Cambarus, and originally contained only four species (P. williamsoni, P. digueti, P. mexicanus and P. cubensis). The subgenus was elevated in 1942 to the taxonomic rank of genus by Horton H. Hobbs Jr., who later erected most of the subgenera formerly recognized within the genus in a 1972 monograph. However, more recently, the subgenera have been eliminated, and while it is recognized that Procambarus is not monophyletic, later literature does not make further taxonomic changes, instead suggesting that more species sampling is required.

=== Species ===
- Procambarus ablusus Penn, 1963
- Procambarus acanthophorus Villalobos, 1948
- Procambarus acherontis (Lönnberg, 1894)
- Procambarus acutissimus (Girard, 1852)
- Procambarus acutus (Girard, 1852)
- Procambarus adani Álvarez, Torres & Villalobos, 2021
- Procambarus advena (LeConte, 1856)
- Procambarus albaughi (Johnson, 2018)
- Procambarus alleni (Faxon, 1884)
- Procambarus ancylus Hobbs, 1958
- †Procambarus angustatus (LeConte, 1856) (Note: † extinct)
- Procambarus apalachicolae Hobbs, 1942
- Procambarus atkinsoni (Ortmann, 1913)
- Procambarus attiguus Hobbs Jr. & Franz, 1992
- Procambarus barbatus (Faxon, 1890)
- Procambarus barbiger Fitzpatrick, 1978
- Procambarus bivittatus Hobbs, 1942
- Procambarus blandingii (Harlan, 1830)
- Procambarus bouvieri (Ortmann, 1909)
- Procambarus braswelli J. E. Cooper, 1998
- Procambarus brazoriensis Albaugh, 1975
- Procambarus caballeroi Villalobos, 1944
- Procambarus capillatus Hobbs, 1971
- Procambarus caritus Hobbs, 1981
- Procambarus catemacoensis Rojas, Alvarez & Villalobos, 2000
- Procambarus cavernicola Mejía-Ortiz, Hartnoll & Viccon-Pale, 2003
- Procambarus ceruleus Fitzpatrick & Wicksten, 1998
- Procambarus chacei Hobbs, 1958
- Procambarus citlaltepetl Rojas, Alvarez & Villalobos, 1999
- Procambarus clarkii (Girard, 1852)
- Procambarus clemmeri Hobbs, 1975
- Procambarus cometes Fitzpatrick, 1978
- Procambarus connus Fitzpatrick, 1978
- Procambarus contrerasi (Creaser, 1931)
- Procambarus cubensis (Erichson, 1846)
- Procambarus cuetzalanae Hobbs, 1982
- Procambarus curdi Reimer, 1975
- Procambarus delicatus Hobbs & Franz, 1986
- Procambarus digueti (Bouvier, 1897)
- Procambarus dupratzi Penn, 1953
- Procambarus echinatus Hobbs, 1956
- Procambarus econfinae Hobbs, 1942
- Procambarus elegans Hobbs, 1969
- Procambarus enoplosternum Hobbs, 1947
- Procambarus epicyrtus Hobbs, 1958
- Procambarus erichsoni Villalobos, 1950
- Procambarus erythrops Relyea & Sutton, 1975
- Procambarus escambiensis Hobbs, 1942
- Procambarus evermanni (Faxon, 1890)
- Procambarus fallax (Hagen, 1870)
- Procambarus fitzpatricki Hobbs, 1972
- Procambarus franzi Hobbs & Lee, 1976
- Procambarus geminus Hobbs, 1975
- Procambarus geodytes Hobbs, 1942
- Procambarus gibbus Hobbs, 1969
- Procambarus gonopodocristatus Villalobos, 1958
- Procambarus gracilis (Bundy, 1876)
- Procambarus hagenianus (Faxon, 1884)
- Procambarus hayi (Faxon, 1884)
- Procambarus hinei (Ortmann, 1905)
- Procambarus hirsutus Hobbs, 1958
- Procambarus hoffmanni (Villalobos, 1944)
- Procambarus holifieldi (Schuster, Taylor & Adams, 2015)
- Procambarus horsti Hobbs & Means, 1972
- Procambarus hortonhobbsi Villalobos, 1950
- Procambarus howellae Hobbs, 1952
- Procambarus hubbelli (Hobbs, 1940)
- Procambarus hybus Hobbs & Walton, 1957
- Procambarus incilis Pennington, 1962
- Procambarus jaculus Hobbs & Walton, 1957
- Procambarus kensleyi Hobbs Jr., 1990
- Procambarus kilbyi (Hobbs, 1940)
- Procambarus lagniappe Black, 1968
- Procambarus latipleurum Hobbs, 1942
- Procambarus lecontei (Hagen, 1870)
- Procambarus leitheuseri Franz & Hobbs, 1983
- Procambarus leonensis Hobbs, 1942
- Procambarus lepidodactylus Hobbs, 1947
- Procambarus lewisi Hobbs & Walton, 1959
- Procambarus liberorum Fitzpatrick, 1978 syn. Procambarus ferrugineus Hobbs & Robison, 1988
- Procambarus litosternum Hobbs, 1947
- Procambarus llamasi Villalobos, 1954
- Procambarus lophotus Hobbs & Walton, 1960
- Procambarus lucifugus (Hobbs, 1940)
- Procambarus lunzi (Hobbs, 1940)
- Procambarus luxus (Johnson, 2011)
- Procambarus lylei Fitzpatrick & Hobbs, 1971
- Procambarus machardyi Walls, 2006
- Procambarus mancus Hobbs & Walton, 1957
- Procambarus marthae Hobbs, 1975
- Procambarus maya Alvarez, López-Mejía & Villalobos, 2007
- Procambarus medialis Hobbs, 1975
- Procambarus mexicanus (Erichson, 1846)
- Procambarus milleri Hobbs, 1971
- Procambarus mirandai Villalobos, 1954
- Procambarus morrisi Hobbs Jr. & Franz, 1991
- Procambarus natchitochae Penn, 1953
- Procambarus nechesae Hobbs Jr., 1990
- Procambarus nigrocinctus Hobbs Jr., 1990
- Procambarus niveus Hobbs & Villalobos, 1964
- Procambarus nueces Hobbs Jr. & Hobbs III, 1995
- Procambarus oaxacae Hobbs, 1973
- Procambarus okaloosae Hobbs, 1942
- Procambarus olmecorum Hobbs, 1987
- Procambarus orcinus Hobbs & Means, 1972
- Procambarus ortmannii Villalobos, 1949
- Procambarus ouachitae Penn, 1956
- Procambarus paeninsulanus (Faxon, 1914)
- Procambarus pallidus (Hobbs, 1940)
- Procambarus paradoxus (Ortmann, 1906)
- Procambarus parasimulans Hobbs & Robison, 1982
- Procambarus pearsei (Creaser, 1934)
- Procambarus penni Hobbs, 1951
- Procambarus pentastylus Walls & Black, 2008
- Procambarus petersi Hobbs, 1981
- Procambarus pictus (Hobbs, 1940)
- Procambarus pilosimanus (Ortmann, 1906)
- Procambarus planirostris Penn, 1953
- Procambarus plumimanus Hobbs & Walton, 1958
- Procambarus pogum Fitzpatrick, 1978
- Procambarus primaevus (Packard, 1880) (Note: † extinct)
- Procambarus pubescens (Faxon, 1884)
- Procambarus pubischelae Hobbs, 1942
  - Procambarus pubischelae deficiens Hobbs, 1981
- Procambarus pycnogonopodus Hobbs, 1942
- Procambarus pygmaeus Hobbs, 1942
- Procambarus raneyi Hobbs, 1953
- Procambarus rathbunae (Hobbs, 1940)
- Procambarus regalis Hobbs & Robison, 1988
- Procambarus regiomontanus Villalobos, 1954
- Procambarus reimeri Hobbs, 1979
- Procambarus riojai (Villalobos, 1944)
- Procambarus roberti Villalobos & Hobbs, 1974
- Procambarus rodriguezi Hobbs, 1943
- Procambarus rogersi (Hobbs, 1938)
- Procambarus ruthveni Pearse, 1911
- Procambarus sbordonii Hobbs, 1977
- Procambarus seminolae Hobbs, 1942
- Procambarus shermani Hobbs, 1942
- Procambarus simulans (Faxon, 1884)
- Procambarus spiculifer (LeConte, 1856)
- Procambarus steigmani Hobbs Jr., 1991
- Procambarus strenthi Hobbs, 1977
- Procambarus suttkusi Hobbs, 1953
- Procambarus talpoides Hobbs, 1981
- Procambarus texanus Hobbs, 1971
- Procambarus teziutlanensis (Villalobos, 1947)
- Procambarus tlapacoyanensis (Villalobos, 1947)
- Procambarus toltecae Hobbs, 1943
- Procambarus troglodytes (LeConte, 1856)
- Procambarus truculentus Hobbs, 1954
- Procambarus tulanei Penn, 1953
- Procambarus vazquezae Villalobos, 1954 (species name often misspelled vasquezae)
- Procambarus veracruzanus Villalobos, 1954
- Procambarus verrucosus Hobbs, 1952
- Procambarus versutus (Hagen, 1870)
- Procambarus viaeviridis (Faxon, 1914)
- Procambarus villalobosi Hobbs, 1969
- Procambarus vioscai Penn, 1946
  - Procambarus vioscai paynei Fitzpatrick, 1990
- Procambarus virginalis (Lyko, 2017)
- Procambarus williamsoni (Ortmann, 1905)
- Procambarus xilitlae Hobbs & Grubbs, 1982
- Procambarus xochitlanae Hobbs, 1975
- Procambarus youngi Hobbs, 1942
- Procambarus zapoapensis Villalobos, 1954
- Procambarus zihuateutlensis Villalobos, 1950
- Procambarus zonangulus Hobbs Jr. & Hobbs III, 1990
