= Procambarus erythrops =

Conservation status
- Endangered (IUCN 3.1)

Scientific classification
- Kingdom: Animalia
- Phylum: Arthropoda
- Clade: Pancrustacea
- Class: Malacostraca
- Order: Decapoda
- Suborder: Pleocyemata
- Family: Cambaridae
- Genus: Procambarus
- Species: P. erythrops

Binomial name
- Procambarus erythrops Relyea & Sutton, 1975

Species of crayfish

Procambarus erythrops, the Santa Fe cave crayfish, is a species of crayfish in the family Cambaridae. It is only known from five sites, all of which are north of the Santa Fe River, east of the Suwannee River, and west of Ichetucknee Springs, in Suwannee County, Florida.
