= Horton H. Hobbs Jr. =

American taxonomist and carcinologist

Dr. Horton Hobbs
- Born: March 29, 1914
- Died: March 22, 1994 (aged 79)
- Education: University of Florida
- Known for: Curator at the United States National Museum
- Scientific career
- Fields: Carcinologist
- Workplaces: Smithsonian Institution, University of Virginia

Horton Holcombe Hobbs Jr. (March 29, 1914 – March 22, 1994) was an American taxonomist and carcinologist, specialising in freshwater decapods. He was also a capable artist, musician, cook and botanist.

Hobbs was born in Alachua County, Florida, on March 29, 1914. He received his Ph.D. from the University of Florida, where he taught until 1946, when he moved to the University of Virginia, becoming director of the Mountain Lake Biological Station for four years. In 1957, he moved to the United States National Museum to be the Head Curator of the Department of Zoology, and two years later was made Senior Scientist in the Department of Invertebrate Zoology, National Museum of Natural History, a position he held until his retirement in 1984.

Hobbs described a total of 286 species (including 168 crayfish species and 104 entocytherid ostracods), 38 genera and subgenera (29 for crayfish, 8 entocytherids and Neopalaemon, a shrimp), and one new family, Cambaridae. His work massively increased the knowledge of crayfish biology, and he authored or co-authored over 40% of the recognized species of North American crayfish. Horton has thus been referred to as "Old Man Crawfish" amongst his colleagues for his decades of research.

Hobbs died on March 22, 1994, of heart disease.
