= List of near threatened arthropods =

- Extinct in the wild (EW): 2 species
- Critically endangered (CR): 393 species
- Endangered (EN): 626 species
- Vulnerable (VU): 1,081 species
- Near threatened (NT, LR/cd): 398 species
- Least concern (LC): 4,080 species
- Data deficient (DD): 2,890 species
Arthropod species (IUCN, 2016-2)
- 9470 extant species have been evaluated
- 6580 of those are fully assessed (Note: excludes data deficient evaluations.)
- 4478 are not threatened at present
- 2100 to 4990 are threatened (Note: Threatened comprises CR, EN and VU. Upper estimate additionally includes DD.)
- 83 to 169 are extinct or extinct in the wild:
  - 81 extinct (EX) species (Note: Chart omits extinct (EX) species)
  - 2 extinct in the wild (EW)
  - 86 possibly extinct [CR(PE)]
  - 0 possibly extinct in the wild [CR(PEW)]

Near threatened (NT) species do not currently qualify for critically endangered (CR), endangered (EN) or vulnerable (VU), but are likely to qualify for a threatened category in the near future, or are already close to qualifying.

In July 2016, the International Union for Conservation of Nature (IUCN) listed 390 near threatened arthropod species. Of all evaluated arthropod species, 4.1% are listed as near threatened. The IUCN also lists six arthropod subspecies as near threatened.

No subpopulations of arthropods have been evaluated by the IUCN.

This is a complete list of near threatened arthropod species and subspecies as evaluated by the IUCN.

== Arachnids ==
- Mexican redknee tarantula (Brachypelma smithi)
- Brignolia bowleri
- Clubiona hitchinsi
- Microbianor nigritarsus
- Spinembolia clabnum
- Karwar large burrowing spider (Thrigmopoeus truculentus)

== Branchiopoda ==
- Mono Lake brine shrimp (Artemia monica)
- California linderiella (Linderiella occidentalis)

== Entognatha ==
- Blasconura batai
- Lepidonella lecongkieti

== Maxillopoda ==
Includes barnacles, copepods and a number of related animals.

- Attheyella yemanjae
- Canthocamptus campaneri
- Metacyclops campestris
- Murunducaris juneae
- Muscocyclops bidentatus
- Muscocyclops therasiae
- Ponticyclops boscoi
- Thermocyclops parvus

== Malacostracans ==
=== Decapods ===
There are 71 decapod species and six decapod subspecies assessed as near threatened.

==== Parastacids ====
- Lilly pilly burrowing crayfish (Engaeus australis)
- Mount Arthur burrowing crayfish (Engaeus orramakunna)
- Engaeus victoriensis
- Euastacus wiowuru
- Western swamp crayfish (Gramastacus insolitus)
- Ombrastacoides asperrimanus
- Ombrastacoides dissitus
- Parastacus brasiliensis

==== Gecarcinucids ====
- Austrothelphusa wasselli
- Ceylonthelphusa kandambyi
- Ceylonthelphusa venusta
- Liotelphusa gagei
- Liotelphusa laevis
- Maydelliathelphusa edentula
- Parathelphusa sarasinorum

==== Atyids ====
Species

- Atyoida bisulcata
- Caridina fasciata
- Caridina formosae
- Caridina mauritii
- Caridina meridonalis
- Caridina richtersi
- Caridina serrata
- Caridina spathulirostris
- Dugastella valentina
- Gallocaris inermis
- Lancaris singhalensis
- Pycneus morsitans
- Troglocaris hercegovinensis
- Troglocaris planinensis
- Troglocaris pretneri

Subspecies

- Troglocaris anophthalmus anophthalmus
- Troglocaris anophthalmus intermedia
- Troglocaris anophthalmus legovici
- Troglocaris anophthalmus ocellata
- Troglocaris anophthalmus periadriatica
- Troglocaris anophthalmus sontica

==== Cambarids ====
- Cambarellus chapalanus
- Big South Fork crayfish (Cambarus bouchardi)
- Coosawattee crayfish (Cambarus coosawattae)
- Broad river stream crayfish (Cambarus lenati)
- Greenbrier cave crayfish (Cambarus nerterius)
- Βristly cave crayfish (Cambarus setosus)
- Beautiful crayfish (Cambarus speciosus)
- Oconee burrowing crayfish (Cambarus truncatus)
- Tuckasegee stream crayfish (Cambarus tuckasegee)
- Brawleys fork crayfish (Cambarus williami)
- Speckled burrowing crayfish (Fallicambarus danielae)
- Jefferson County crayfish (Fallicambarus gilpini)
- Camp Shelby burrowing crayfish (Fallicambarus gordoni)
- Ouachita burrowing crayfish (Fallicambarus harpi)
- Flatwoods digger (Fallicambarus oryktes)
- Ouachita fencing crayfish (Faxonella creaseri)
- Blood river crayfish (Orconectes burri)
- Mammoth spring crayfish (Orconectes marchandi)
- Livingston crayfish (Orconectes margorectus)
- Procambarus cuetzalanae
- Lagniappe crayfish (Procambarus lagniappe)
- Pallid cave crayfish (Procambarus pallidus)
- Black creek crayfish (Procambarus pictus)
- Procambarus vazquezae
- Procambarus zapoapensis
- Spider cave crayfish (Troglocambarus maclanei)

==== Potamids ====
- Miyazaki's crab (Geothelphusa miyazakii)
- Geothelphusa tenuimanus
- Johora tiomanensis
- Pilosamon guinotae
- Potamon fluviatile
- Potamon ibericum
- Potamon potamios
- Potamon rhodium
- Potamon setiger

==== Other decapod species ====
- Deckenia imitatrix
- Deckenia mitis
- Macrobrachium occidentale
- Neostrengeria perijaensis
- Cape Verde spiny lobster (Palinurus charlestoni)
- Troglocubanus eigenmanni

== Insects ==
There are 301 insect species assessed as near threatened.

=== Hemiptera ===
- Cassini periodical cicada (Magicicada cassini)
- Decim periodical cicada (Magicicada septendecim)
- Decula periodical cicada (Magicicada septendecula)

=== Orthoptera ===
- Southern Sardinian cricket (Acroneuroptila puddui)
- Northern Sardinian cricket (Acroneuroptila sardoa)
- Gomera stick grasshopper (Acrostira bellamyi)
- Gran Canaria stick grasshopper (Acrostira tamarani)
- Tenerife short-winged bush-cricket (Ariagona margaritae)
- Splendid rock grasshopper (Arminda canariensis)
- Tenerife laurel bush-cricket (Canariola willemsei)
- Plump-headed grasshopper (Chorthippus crassiceps)
- Parnon grasshopper (Chorthippus parnon)
- Nymph-like grasshopper (Chorthippus pulloides)
- Giglio cave cricket (Dolichopoda aegilion)
- Larissa cave-cricket (Dolichopoda annae)
- Koutouki cave-cricket (Dolichopoda insignis)
- Kiriaki cave-cricket (Dolichopoda kiriakii)
- Cretan cave-cricket (Dolichopoda paraskevi)
- Corfu cave-cricket (Dolichopoda steriotisi)
- Ionian marbled bush-cricket (Eupholidoptera cephalonica)
- Uvarov's marbled bush-cricket (Eupholidoptera uvarovi)
- Cyprian tonged bush-cricket (Exodrymadusa inornata)
- Heldreich's stone grasshopper (Glyphotmethis heldreichi)
- Canarian crevice-cricket (Gryllomorpha canariensis)
- White-horned Italian grasshopper (Italohippus albicornis)
- Calabrian speckled bush-cricket (Leptophyes calabra)
- Greek speckled bush-cricket (Leptophyes lisae)
- California ground cricket (Neonemobius eurynotus)
- Parnassos glandular cricket (Ovaliptila krueperi)
- Sporades glandular cricket (Ovaliptila wettsteini)
- Jablanica bright bush-cricket (Poecilimon jablanicensis)
- Andros bright bush-cricket (Poecilimon klausgerhardi)
- Maquis bush-cricket (Rhacocleis silvestrii)
- Werner's bush-cricket (Rhacocleis werneri)
- Spanistic desert grasshopper (Spaniacris deserticola)
- Black-headed Jerusalem cricket (Stenopelmatus nigrocapitatus)
- Zoia's cave-cricket (Troglophilus zoiai)
- Aegean desert grasshopper (Xerohippus solerii)

=== Hymenoptera ===
- Bombus digressus
- Bombus diligens
- Bombus mendax
- Bombus mucidus
- Colletes creticus
- Colletes cyprius
- Colletes halophilus
- Epeolus cruciger
- Eucera gracilipes
- Formica aquilonia
- Formica lugubris
- Formica polyctena
- Formica pratensis
- Red wood ant (Formica rufa)
- Formica uralensis
- Hylaeus crassanus
- Hylaeus friesei
- Lasioglossum minutulum
- Lasioglossum sabulosum
- Lasioglossum setulosum
- Nomada argentata
- Nomada armata
- Nomada baccata
- Nomada cretensis
- Nomada errans
- Antennal-waving wasp (Tachysphex pechumani)

=== Lepidoptera ===
Lepidoptera comprises moths and butterflies. There are 62 species in the order Lepidoptera assessed as near threatened.

==== Swallowtail butterflies ====
- False Apollo (Archon apollinus)
- Short-horned baronia (Baronia brevicornis)
- Graphium mendana
- Japanese luehdorfia (Luehdorfia japonica)
- Chimaera birdwing (Ornithoptera chimaera)
- Papilio benguetanus
- Papilio grosesmithi
- Papilio himeros
- Papilio manlius
- Papilio maraho
- Kilimanjaro swallowtail (Papilio sjoestedti)
- Parides burchellanus
- Kaiserihind (Teinopalpus imperialis)
- Borneo birdwing (Troides andromache)

==== Lycaenids ====
- Lequeux's buff (Baliochila lequeuxi)
- Drakensberg copper (Chrysoritis oreas)
- Iolaus aphnaeoides
- Wineland blue (Lepidochrysops bacchus)
- Large copper (Lycaena dispar)
- Large blue (Phengaris arion)
- Greater large blue (Phengaris arionides)
- Dusky large blue (Phengaris nausithous)
- Scarce large blue (Phengaris teleius)
- Alpine zephyr blue (Plebejus trappi)
- Poecilmitis aureus
- Atlas blue (Polyommatus atlanticus)
- Beautiful blue (Polyommatus guezelmavi)
- Higgins's anomalous blue (Polyommatus nephohiptamenos)
- Mother-of-pearl blue (Polyommatus nivescens)
- Panoptes blue (Pseudophilotes panoptes)
- Thestor brachycerus
- Odd-spot blue (Turanana taygetica)

==== Nymphalids ====
- Lesser false fritillary (Anetia briarea)
- Salvin's anetia (Anetia cubana)
- Jaeger's anetia (Anetia jaegeri)
- False fritillary (Anetia pantheratus)
- False ringlet (Coenonympha oedippus)
- Vaucher's heath (Coenonympha vaucheri)
- Jamaican monarch (Danaus cleophile)
- White speck ringlet (Erebia claudina)
- Erebia epistgyne (Erebia epistygne)
- Yellow-banded ringlet (Erebia flavofasciata)
- Schaus's crow (Euploea blossomae)
- Javan crow (Euploea gamelia)
- Sumatran crow (Euploea martinii)
- Swainson's crow (Euploea swainson)
- Tobler's crow (Euploea tobleri)
- Woodland grayling (Hipparchia fagi)
- Eolian grayling (Hipparchia leighebi)
- Ceylon tree nymph (Idea iasonia)
- Malabar tree-nymph (Idea malabarica)
- Chios meadow brown (Maniola chia)
- Principe sailer (Neptis larseni)
- Zinken's tiger (Parantica albata)
- Nilgiri tiger (Parantica nilgiriensis)
- Javan tiger (Parantica pseudomelaneus)
- Ceylon tiger (Parantica taprobana)
- Sumatran chocolate tiger (Parantica tityoides)
- Magpie (Protoploea apatela)

==== Other Lepidoptera species ====
- Mountain clouded yellow (Colias phicomone)
- Small chimney-sweep grass moth (Helenoscoparia nigritalis)
- Wandering skipper (Panoquina errans)

=== Beetles ===
There are 56 beetle species assessed as near threatened.

==== Geotrupids ====
- Ceratophyus hoffmannseggi
- Lethrus fallax
- Thorectes albarracinus
- Thorectes lusitanicus
- Thorectes marginatus

==== Click beetles ====
- Cardinal click beetle (Ampedus cardinalis)
- Ampedus carinthiacus
- Ampedus coenobita
- Ampedus corsicus
- Brachygonus meraculus
- Crepidophorus mutilatus
- Reitterelater bouyoni

==== Scarabaeids ====
- Alocoderus carinifrons
- Ammoecius lusitanicus
- Anomius crovettii
- Anomius peyerimhoffi
- Anonychonitis freyi
- Ateuchetus cicatricosus
- Cryptocanthon foveatus
- Cryptocanthon genieri
- Euorodalus boiteli
- Genieridium medinae
- Gymnopleurus sturmi
- Gyronotus dispar
- Gyronotus mulanjensis
- Heptaulacus brancoi
- Holocephalus sculptus
- Macroderes endroedyi
- Macroderes undulatus
- Mimonthophagus limbibasis
- Ontherus grandis
- Ontherus irinus
- Onthophagus merdarius
- Oxysternon pteroderum
- Pedaria cambeforti
- Phanaeus achilles
- Scarabaeus bornemizzai
- Scybalocanthon darlingtoni

==== Other beetle species ====
- Agathidium pulchellum
- Blabinotus spinicollis
- Blue ground beetle (Carabus intricatus)
- Ceruchus chrysomelinus
- Colophon izardi
- Cucujus cinnaberinus
- Daisy-plant fungus weevil (Homoeodera compositarum)
- Hylis simonae
- Microrhagus pyrenaeus
- Osmoderma barnabita
- Hermit beetle (Osmoderma eremita)
- Pseudotriphyllus suturalis
- Purpuricenus nicocles
- Ropalopus insubricus
- Stephanopachys brunneus
- Trichius orientalis
- Xyletinus tremulicola
- Xylophilus testaceus

=== Odonata ===
Odonata includes dragonflies and damselflies. There are 119 species in the order Odonata assessed as near threatened.

==== Chlorocyphids ====
- Chlorocypha bamptoni
- Angola jewel (Chlorocypha crocea)
- Indocypha vittata
- Libellago stictica
- Tanganyika jewel (Platycypha pinheyi)
- Rhinocypha xanthe
- Yellow-sided jewel (Stenocypha jacksoni)
- Bow-faced jewel (Stenocypha molindica)

==== Platycnemidids ====
- Allocnemis abbotti
- Katanga yellowwing (Allocnemis mitwabae)
- Elattoneura atkinsoni
- Idiocnemis adelbertensis
- Melanoneura bilineata
- Gambia riverjack (Mesocnemis dupuyi)
- Nososticta irene
- Phylloneura westermanni
- Platycnemis agrioides
- Risiocnemis serrata

==== Gomphids ====
- Acrogomphus malayanus
- Anormogomphus kiritshenkoi
- Asiagomphus amamiensis
- Asiagomphus personatus
- Diminutive clubtail (Gomphus diminutus)
- Twin-striped clubtail (Gomphus geminatus)
- Pronged clubtail (Gomphus graslinii)
- Hodges' clubtail (Gomphus hodgesi)
- Heliogomphus kelantanensis
- Heliogomphus promelas
- Wall's grappletail (Heliogomphus walli)
- Ictinogomphus acutus
- Megalogomphus hannyngtoni
- Merogomphus martini
- Neurogomphus pallidus
- Faded pincertail (Onychogomphus costae)
- Onychogomphus treadawayi
- Acuminate snaketail (Ophiogomphus acuminatus)
- Appalachian snaketail (Ophiogomphus incurvatus)
- Cataract hooktail (Paragomphus cataractae)
- Brook hooktail (Paragomphus henryi)
- Sinai hooktail (Paragomphus sinaiticus)
- Belle's sanddragon (Progomphus bellei)
- Progomphus kimminsi
- Stylurus nagoyanus
- Stylurus oculatus

==== Cordulegastrids ====
- Sombre goldenring (Cordulegaster bidentata)
- Balkan goldenring (Cordulegaster heros)
- Atlas goldenring (Cordulegaster princeps)
- Italian goldenring (Cordulegaster trinacriae)
- Neallogaster ornata

==== Corduliids ====
- Pilbara emerald (Hemicordulia koomina)
- Hemicordulia mindana
- Procordulia karnyi
- Calvert's emerald (Somatochlora calverti)
- Hine's emerald dragonfly (Somatochlora hineana)
- Ozark emerald (Somatochlora ozarkensis)

==== Calopterygids ====
- Atrocalopteryx atrocyana
- Calopteryx coomani
- Sapho infumosa
- Vestalis anacolosa
- Vestalis luctuosa

==== Coenagrionids ====
- Papyrus wisp (Agriocnemis palaeforma)
- Andinagrion garrisoni
- Archibasis rebeccae
- Argia rosseri
- Forest azuret (Azuragrion buchholzi)
- Socotra bluet (Azuragrion granti)
- Southern damselfly (Coenagrion mercuriale)
- Syrian bluet (Coenagrion syriacum)
- Scarlet bluet (Enallagma pictum)
- Pine barrens bluet (Enallagma recurvatum)
- Ischnura aralensis
- Dumont's bluetail (Ischnura intermedia)
- Nigrohamatum damselfly (Megalagrion nigrohamatum)
- Kauai bog damselfly (Megalagrion paludicola)
- Mortonagrion arthuri
- Four-spot midget (Mortonagrion hirosei)
- Everglades sprite (Nehalennia pallidula)
- Pygmy damselfly (Nehalennia speciosa)
- Protallagma hoffmanni
- Protoneura macintyrei
- Katanga sprite (Pseudagrion symoensii)

==== Aeshnids ====
- Allopetalia reticulosa
- Swamp emperor (Anax bangweuluensis)
- Terrestrial evening darner (Antipodophlebia asthenes)
- Green-striped darner (Dromaeschna forcipata)
- Oligoaeschna platyura
- Oligoaeschna poeciloptera
- Planaeschna intersedens

==== Libellulids ====
- Forestwatcher (Huonia melvillens)
- Indothemis carnatica
- Libellula mariae
- Red chaser (Libellula pontica)
- Nyungwe junglewatcher (Neodythemis nyungwe)
- Trithemis aequalis
- Trithemis brydeni

==== Other Odonata species ====
- Tiny flatwing (Argiolestes pusillissimus)
- Alpine redspot (Austropetalia victoria)
- Chlorogomphus auratus
- Drepanosticta brownelli
- Drepanosticta fontinalis
- Drepanosticta krios
- Queen malachite (Ecchlorolestes nylephtha)
- Relict Himalayan dragonfly (Epiophlebia laidlawi)
- Pilbara pin (Eurysticta coolawanyah)
- Coomalie pin (Eurysticta coomalie)
- Ivory-faced flatwing (Heteragrion eboratum)
- Idionyx optata
- Indolestes bellax
- Indolestes indicus
- Macromia callisto
- Mountain river cruiser (Macromia margarita)
- Orange-spotted emerald (Oxygastra curtisii)
- Coastal petaltail (Petalura litorea)
- Philogenia helena
- Phyllomacromia funicularioides
- Rhinagrion elopurae
- Horned bannerwing (Stenocora percornuta)
- Tasmanian spotwing (Synthemiopsis gomphomacromioides)
- Teinopodagrion vallenatum

== See also ==
- Lists of IUCN Red List near threatened species
- List of least concern arthropods
- List of vulnerable arthropods
- List of endangered arthropods
- List of critically endangered arthropods
- List of recently extinct arthropods
- List of data deficient arthropods
