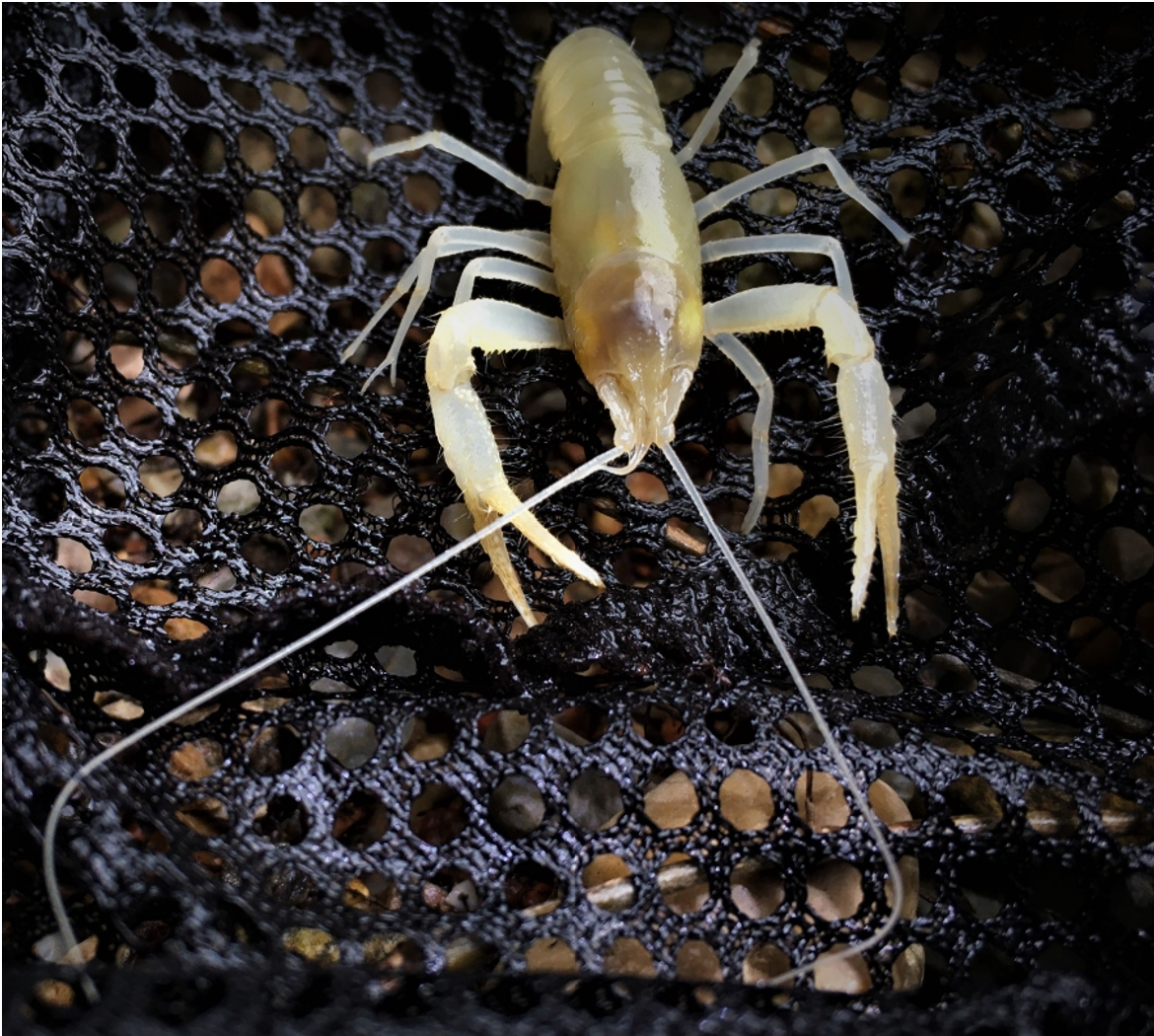

Conservation status
- Critically Endangered (IUCN 3.1)

- Critically Imperiled (NatureServe)

Scientific classification
- Kingdom: Animalia
- Phylum: Arthropoda
- Clade: Pancrustacea
- Class: Malacostraca
- Order: Decapoda
- Suborder: Pleocyemata
- Family: Cambaridae
- Genus: Cambarus
- Species: C. zophonastes

Binomial name
- Cambarus zophonastes Hobbs & Bedinger, 1964

= Cambarus zophonastes =

Species of crayfish

Cambarus zophonastes, also known as the Hell Creek Cave crayfish, is named for its original location of discovery, Hell Creek Cave. It is also found in other similar habitats in Stone County and Marion County, Arkansas. These habitats include springs and caves such as Nesbitt Spring Cave in Stone County. C. zophanastes is critically endangered according to the IUCN (International Union for Conservation of Nature). C. zophanastes is also protected by the ESA (Endangered Species Act) as an endangered species. Currently conservation efforts focus on monitoring populations, reducing disturbances, and monitoring water quality. More research has to be conducted to better understand and conserve the species.

== Description ==
The Hell Creek Crayfish lacks pigment in its body and does not have eyes. It reaches an overall body length of 2.5 to 3.0 inches. It has a convergent rostrum, which is the beak-like shell located between the crayfish's eyes. Its areola is narrow, and if a cervical spine is present, it is very small. It can be differentiated from its closest relatives, C. setosus which has a wider areola and one to several spines while its other close relative C. tartarus also has a wider areola.

== Life History ==
Currently, there is little information about the life history of C. zophonastes due to limited sightings. One egg-bearing female was discovered in 1975, providing insights into the reproductive habits of the species. The reproductive habits are likely comparable to other troglobites. Reproduction occurs in late winter and spring months for other troglobites. Reproduction occurs in those months since water levels are higher. Higher water levels, in turn, increase the nutrients available for reproduction. Troglobites have low reproductive rates and take longer periods to reach maturity. This is overcome by increased survival rates of offspring. The lifespan is predicted to be 40 years, based on research done of similar crayfish in Florida.

== Ecology ==
=== Diet ===
The basis of the food chain for this habitat is organic matter brought into the caves as a result of flooding after a rainstorm. There is currently no research on what C. zophonastes eats, but its diet can be inferred by comparing the diets of other similar crayfish. Some crayfish within its genus include C. robustus and C. tenebrosus. C. robustus filter feeds algae from the water. C. tenebrosus eats plant material, and occasionally eat small animals such as frogs or salamanders. It is reasonable to conclude that C. zophonastes most likely gets nutrients from very similar eating patterns. It likely consumes organic matter filtered from the water, as well as occasionally eating other animals

=== Behavior ===
C. zophonastes shows no response to light or observation, likely as a result of its lack of eyes. It is able to recognize and respond to attempts to be captured. The environment C. zophonastes lives is particularly nutrient poor, necessitating a low metabolic level. From this, it can be inferred that the crayfish spends most its time moving very slowly, or not at all, to conserve energy. Since food is scarce in this environment and there are few opportunities to feed, these crayfish are likely very opportunistic foragers. Other than this, little is known about the behaviour of C. zophonastes. To better understand the mating and territorial behaviours of this species more research must be conducted.

=== Habitat ===
The Hell Creek Cave crayfish can be found in various stream habitats in Arkansas. Within these habitats it thrives on muddy stream bottoms or along cave stream walls. These habitats have no visible light and a stable, low temperature. The aquatic system in this environment is relatively stable, except for occasional flooding when it rains. Its preferred habitat conditions are mostly identical among the various locations it is located.

=== Geographical Distribution ===
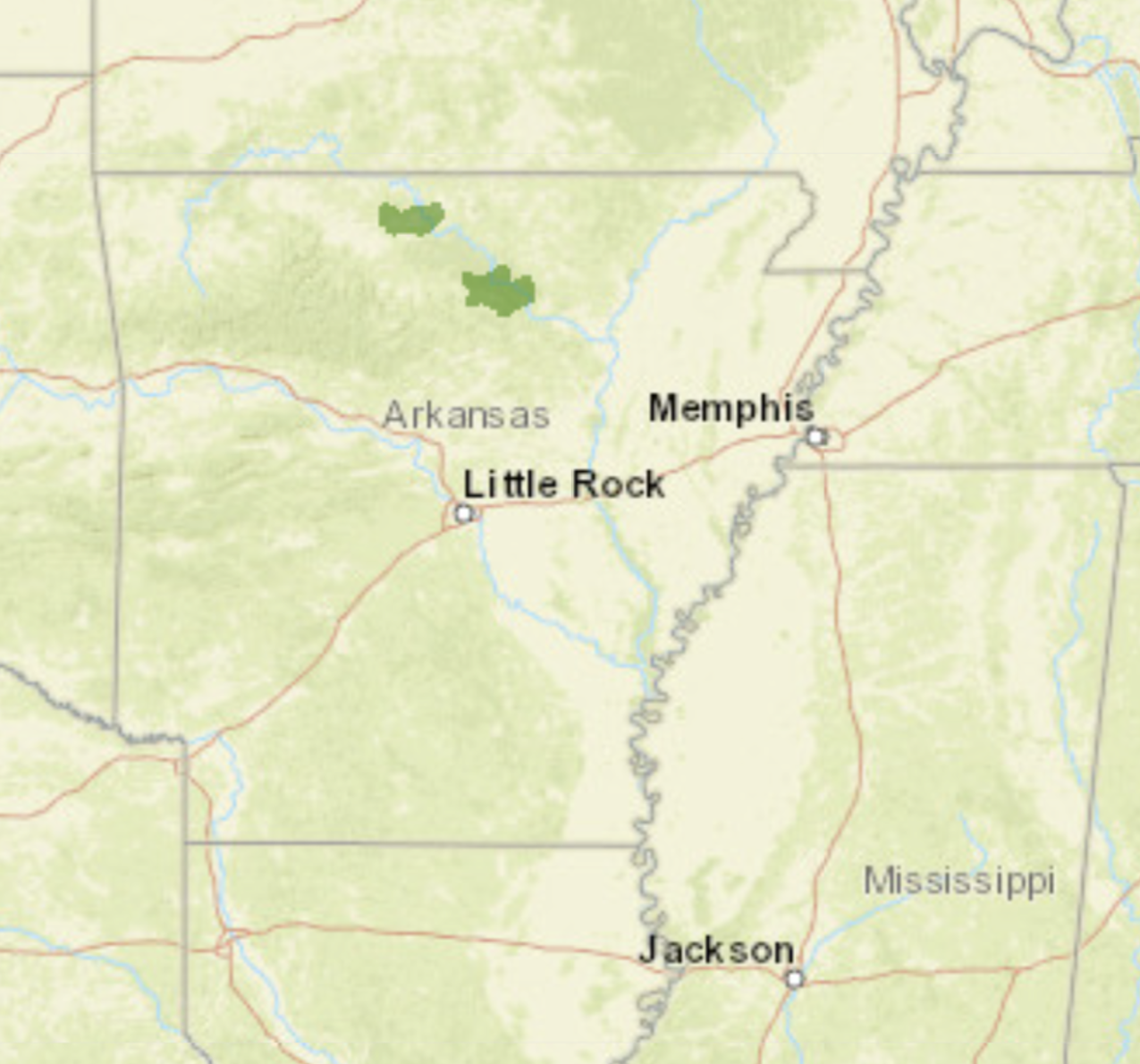

From 1964 until recent years, the Hell Creek Cave crayfish was only believed to exist in the cave system that is its namesake. Yet in 2005, a second population of crayfish was found in Nesbitt Spring cave in the same county. Then in 2010, a third population was discovered at an upwelling near Town Branch River in Yellville, Arkansas. These new populations are most likely not due to the species range expanding, however. Rather, this is most likely due to increased access and searches by researchers leading to the discovery of populations that have always been there. None of the populations of C. zophonastes have disappeared from any locations since they have been found, either. In conclusion, their geographical distribution is most likely static.

==== Range Map ====
An interactive range map can be found at ECOS. The dark green areas demonstrate the areas in which Hell Creek Cave Crayfish are found in Arkansas, U.S.A.

=== Historic and current population size ===
During the 2018 annual Hell Creek Cave Survey there was a slight decline in the mean number of crayfish observed. This decline in observed crayfish may not actually represent a decline in crayfish population though. In past surveys of Hell Creek Cave and Nesbitt Spring cave, both the traversable and diveable portions of the caves were fully surveyed for crayfish. However, in recent years, only the traversable portions of these caves have been surveyed. This brings into question the continued accuracy of the C. zophonastes census. Looking at only full surveys of the caves, Hell Creek Cave had 15 individuals in 1983, 13 individuals in 1990, and 12 individuals in 2007. Similarly, Nesbitt Spring cave had "dozens" of individuals in 1992 and 9 individuals in 2004. These surveys are useful but do not provide sufficient data to accurately estimate population sizes or trends.

As of 2018, there are three confirmed populations of this crayfish. They are located in Hell Creek Cave, Nesbitt Spring, and the Yellville Town Branch Creek System. There is also a fourth unconfirmed population, but genetic testing has not yet been conducted and the location has been withheld.

== Conservation ==
=== Major Threats ===
The main threats to C. zophonastes are the fragmentation and destruction of its habitats. Habitat fragmentation can occur due to erosion and sedimentation resulting from human activity. Habitat destruction most often takes the form of pollution, such as urban runoff and waste disposal. Other threats affecting this species include crayfish collection, human disturbance, and a lack of reproduction. These crayfish have a small population size, as well as a very low reproductive rate and the relatively long time to reach maturity compared to other crayfish. Human disturbance has a significant impact on this species to their troglobitic nature. This can include anything as small as the presence of humans and disturbance of water in their habitat. Like the habitats of other troglobites, there is very little energy available in this species' environment due to a lack of primary producers. Energy wasted responding to human activity may greatly affect survivability and reproduction. Due to having such a small population, any loss of reproduction would likely be quite harmful to the species. For example, if an egg-bearing female were to be disturbed or collected, and it lost its eggs, the biotic potential of the entire population would be significantly reduced.

=== History of ESA and IUCN listing ===
C. zophonastes was petitioned to be listed under the Endangered Species Act on May 5, 1986. It was eventually listed as an endangered species on April 7, 1987. A recovery plan was established in 1988. Five year reviews have been conducted on April 17, 2019, August 13, 2012, and November 6, 1991. Additional status reviews were conducted on August 2, 2007, and in the year 1984. The most recent review maintained its classification of Hell Creek Crayfish as endangered. It suggested several ways on how to improve the status to threatened. Options for this included improving land use regulations, excluding recreational cavers, and locating and protecting other viable populations. Conservationists can accomplish this through several methods. For example, improving cave protection, share the importance of the cave ecosystem with locals, water quality monitoring, and monitoring the status of the crayfish.

==== Species Status Assessment ====
This species' status is considered stable as of 2018. There is no evidence that indicates a noticeable decline in population numbers or habitat quality for this species over the past several years.

=== Current Conservation Efforts ===
Current conservation efforts are outlined in the endangered species recovery plan. The recovery plan for the Hell Creek Cave Crayfish was established on September 26, 1988. It has not been updated since. Also, it is currently in its final phase. Therefore, conservation efforts are to be periodically maintained. For the Hell Creek Cave crayfish to be down-listed from endangered to threatened, three viable populations of the species must be discovered and protected. To potentially be delisted from the ESA and considered recovered, a total of ten populations must be discovered, and a total of five viable populations must be fully protected. Due to the troglobitic nature of the Hell Creek Cave Crayfish, it is unlikely that such populations will be found. Also, given that the species has a severely low population, it is unlikely that any of the crayfish could be relocated or bred in captivity without risking the original population. Therefore, delisting is unlikely.

Currently, there is not a designated critical habitat for this species.

==== Accomplished Conservation Efforts ====
To protect the Hell Creek Cave Crayfish, the Hell Creek Cave and its recharge area must be protected. In order to preserve the cave, an agreement with the Arkansas Natural Heritage Commission (NHC) and the Arkansas Game and Fish Commission was met. Admonitory signs were posted and a barrier was erected to prevent unauthorized cavers from entering. Also, all land which contributes to the recharge of the cave's water supply was identified by the Ozark Underground Laboratory under contract to the NHC.

==== Ongoing Conservation Efforts ====
Ongoing conservation efforts to protect the species take a variety of approaches. One essential aspect is protecting land that provides recharge to the Hell Creek Cave. Projects requiring state or federal approval must be reviewed to determine if they will negatively impact the Hell Creek Cave crayfish. Recruiting locals for conservation can also be useful. This can be done by educating people about the fragility of the Hell Creek Cave and its inhabitants, as well as their significance. Locals can also help as contacts to report events that may impact the ecological status of Hell Creek Cave, such as chemical spills on highways.

==== Data Collection ====
===== Surveying for new populations =====
Efforts to discover new populations are ongoing and some have been successful. Currently, the species has been identified in two more caves and a spring in Stone County (where the Hell Creek Cave is located). The species has also been found in a spring in Marion County, Arkansas. Researchers continue to survey caves and aquatic habitats where the species may exist, but they were not noticed in previous caving expeditions. Research is limited in sites that are inaccessible to humans such as the Yellville site.

===== Conducting population studies =====
Baseline population data was collected and is compared to new data. Changes will be used to evaluate impacts of protective measures, and to develop management activities to conserve the species.

===== Assessing water quality =====
Water quality is assessed to determine levels of pollution and the health of the aquatic habitat.
