= Blue crayfish (disambiguation) =

The blue crayfish is Procambarus alleni, of which an electric blue morph is common in aquaria.

Blue crayfish may also refer to:

- Cherax quadricarinatus - tropical blue crayfish, or blue lobster, also common in aquaria
- Cambarus monongalensis - Blue or Mononghela crayfish
- Euastacus sulcatus - Blue or Lamington crayfish, from Australia

Also, three North American burrowing crayfish have 'blue' in their common name:

- Cambarus cymatilis - Conasauga blue burrower
- Cambarus harti - Piedmont blue burrower
- Cambarus loughmani - Blue Teays mudbug

== See also ==
- Blue lobster (disambiguation)
