= Cambarus jonesi =

Conservation status
- Vulnerable (IUCN 3.1)

- Imperiled (NatureServe)

Scientific classification
- Kingdom: Animalia
- Phylum: Arthropoda
- Clade: Pancrustacea
- Class: Malacostraca
- Order: Decapoda
- Suborder: Pleocyemata
- Family: Cambaridae
- Genus: Cambarus
- Species: C. jonesi

Binomial name
- Cambarus jonesi Hobbs and Barr, 1960

Species of crayfish

Cambarus jonesi, the Alabama cave crayfish, is a small, freshwater crayfish endemic to Alabama in the United States. It is an underground species known only from 12 caves.

== Distribution ==
The Alabama cave crayfish is known from cave systems in the Tennessee River basin between Florence and Guntersville. It has been found in Colbert, Limestone, Lauderdale, Madison, and Morgan counties in Alabama. Specimens from Marshall County, formerly thought to be this species, actually represent two distinct species, Cambarus speleocoopi and Cambarus laconensis

== Etymology ==
The name jonesi honors Walter B. Jones.
