= Cambarus smilax =

Conservation status
- Imperiled (NatureServe)

Scientific classification
- Kingdom: Animalia
- Phylum: Arthropoda
- Clade: Pancrustacea
- Class: Malacostraca
- Order: Decapoda
- Suborder: Pleocyemata
- Family: Cambaridae
- Genus: Cambarus
- Species: C. smilax

Binomial name
- Cambarus smilax (Loughman, Simon, and Welch, 2011)

Species of crayfish

Cambarus smilax, the Greenbrier crayfish, is a crayfish in the order Decapoda, family Cambaridae, genus Cambarus. It is most closely related to Cambarus robustus. It is endemic to the Greenbrier River watershed in Pocahontas, Greenbrier, and Monroe counties in West Virginia. It gets its common name from the Greenbrier River. It was described as a new crayfish species in 2011.
