= Cambarus gentryi =

Conservation status
- Least Concern (IUCN 3.1)

- Apparently Secure (NatureServe)

Scientific classification
- Kingdom: Animalia
- Phylum: Arthropoda
- Clade: Pancrustacea
- Class: Malacostraca
- Order: Decapoda
- Suborder: Pleocyemata
- Family: Cambaridae
- Genus: Cambarus
- Species: C. gentryi

Binomial name
- Cambarus gentryi Hobbs, 1970

Species of crayfish

Cambarus gentryi, the linear cobalt crayfish, is a small species of burrowing crayfish. One of 115 species in the genus Cambarus, it is notable for its deep blue carapace. It is endemic to Tennessee in the United States.

== Taxonomy and description ==
Although three specimens of C. gentryi were collected and stored in the 1890s, the species was not described until 1970 by Horton Hobbs, Jr. This followed its 1968 collection by Dr. Glenn Gentry, from which the species name was derived.

== Geographic range ==
The linear cobalt crayfish has been found in the Cumberland and Duck river basins in Tennessee. There are 37 reported sightings of C. gentryi on the Global Biodiversity Information Facility (GBIF) between 1962-2022. They are all localized to the southern part of Tennessee in the USA, North America.

== Physical description ==
Cambarus gentryi has a shell length of around 3–5 cm (1.2–2.0 in) and pincers about 2 cm (0.79 in) long. Its shell is cobalt blue in colour with orange or yellow to yellowish-green markings. The eyes are small and well-developed, and the areola (a structure which runs along the centre of the cephalothorax) is sublinear, or mostly uncurved. Like other decapods, C. gentryi has ten pairs of legs, of which the forward-most pair are modified into robust pincers known as chela.

The type specimen is stored in the Smithsonian Institution in Washington, D.C., USA under the identifier USNM 130283. The allotype (female) and morphotype (male) are in the same institution under the identifiers USNM 130284 and 130285.

== Habitat ==
The linear cobalt crayfish creates burrows in damp areas along river banks. Its burrows have been described in several locations across its range; although sometimes limited by soil depth, they can have multiple openings to the surface and have been found to be up to about 2.5 m (8 ft) in length and 0.91 m (3 ft) in depth.

== Development and reproduction ==
Adults in family Cambaridae alternate molts between reproductive (form I) and non reproductive (Form II) forms. Male form I has larger claws and altered sperm transfer gonopods; in some species, the female form I has a wider abdomen. On collection of C. gentryi specimens in and prior to 1970, first-form males were collected at various times of year (April, May, and November) and egg- or young-bearing females had not been collected or identified.

== Lifespan ==
The exact lifespan of C. gentryi is not known; however, other individuals in this family (Cambaridae) have been known to live 6–7 years.

== Ecological Interactions ==
C. gentryi is a known host of Uncinocythere zancla, an entocytherid osctracod. This is a small crustacean which lives as an obligate ectosymbiont to other crustaceans by attaching to the carapaces.

== Conservation status ==
Cambarus gentryi is listed as least concern by the IUCN.

== Genomic information ==
Five publicly available gene fragment sequences exist for C. gentryi, available through NCBI genbank with taxonomy ID NCBI:txid318489. The following gene fragments are available:

1. Isolate JF2508 cytochrome c oxidase subunit I (COI) gene; Accession no. KX417101.1
2. Histone H3 (H3) gene, partial cds; Accession no. DQ411804.1
3. Cytochrome oxidase subunit I (CO1) gene, partial cds; mitochondrial; Accession no. DQ411785.1
4. 12S ribosomal RNA gene, partial sequence; mitochondrial; Accession no. DQ411731.1
5. 16S ribosomal RNA gene, partial sequence; mitochondrial; Accession no. AY853664.1
