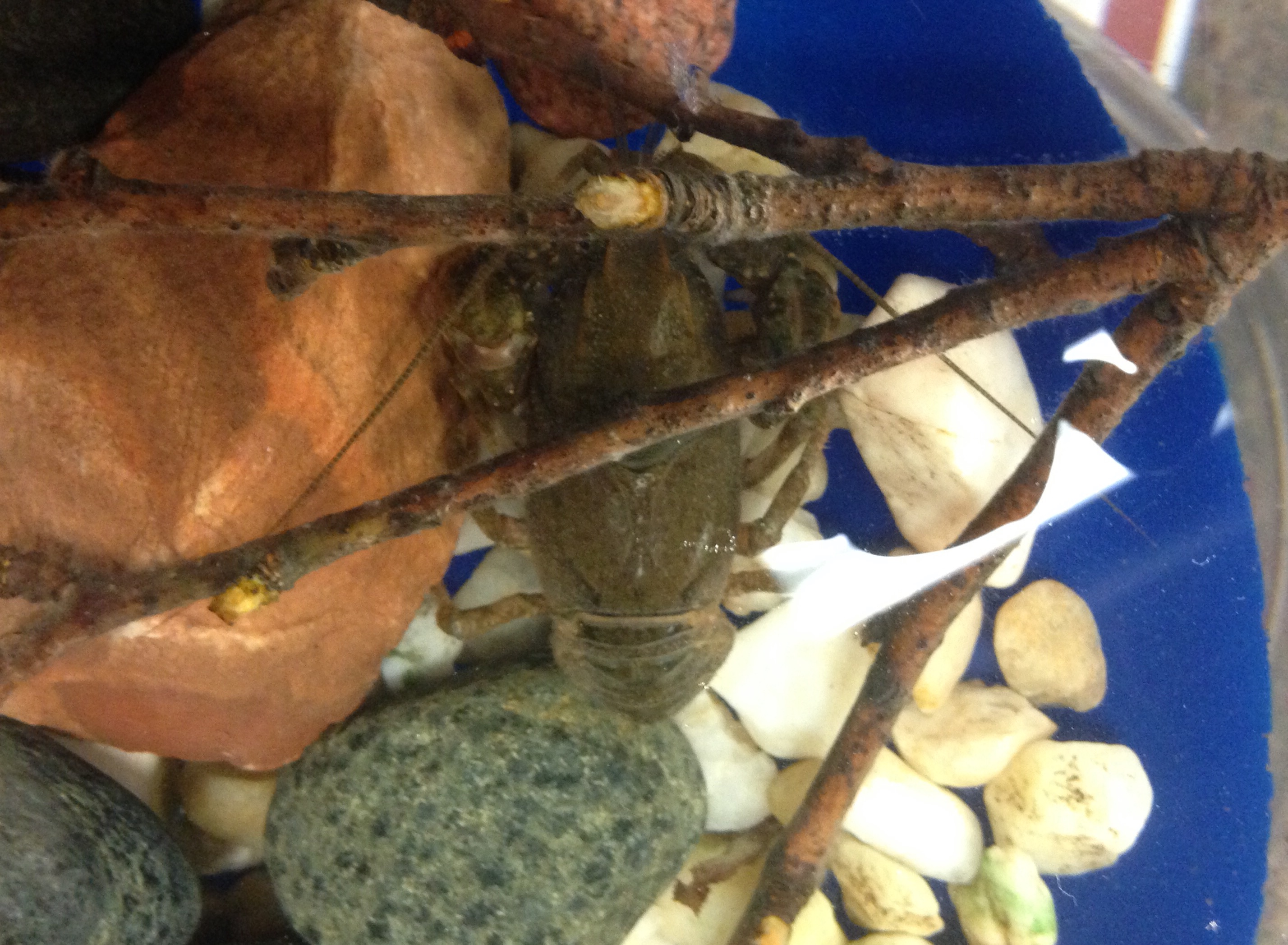

Conservation status
- Least Concern (IUCN 3.1)

- Vulnerable (NatureServe)

Scientific classification
- Kingdom: Animalia
- Phylum: Arthropoda
- Clade: Pancrustacea
- Class: Malacostraca
- Order: Decapoda
- Suborder: Pleocyemata
- Family: Cambaridae
- Genus: Cambarus
- Species: C. davidi

Binomial name
- Cambarus davidi (Cooper, 2000)

= Cambarus davidi =

Species of crayfish

Cambarus davidi, also known as the Carolina ladle crayfish, is a species of crayfish in the family Cambaridae. It is endemic to central North Carolina, where it is restricted to the upper Neuse and Cape Fear river basins.
