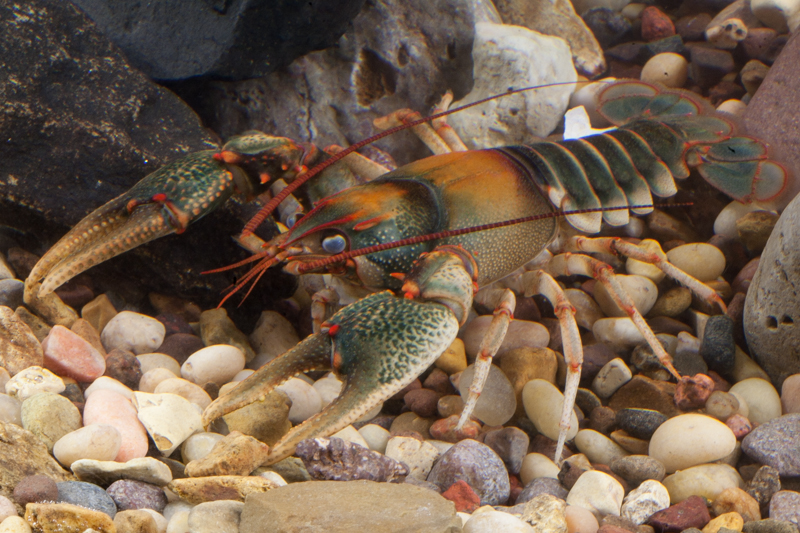

Conservation status
- Least Concern (IUCN 3.1)

- Vulnerable (NatureServe)

Scientific classification
- Kingdom: Animalia
- Phylum: Arthropoda
- Clade: Pancrustacea
- Class: Malacostraca
- Order: Decapoda
- Suborder: Pleocyemata
- Family: Cambaridae
- Genus: Cambarus
- Species: C. scotti

Binomial name
- Cambarus scotti (Hobbs, 1981)

= Cambarus scotti =

Species of crayfish

Cambarus scotti, the Chattooga River crayfish, is a species of crayfish in the family Cambaridae. It is endemic to Alabama and Georgia. The common name refers to the Chattooga River. The original specimens were collected from Clarks Creek in Chattooga County.

The IUCN conservation status of Cambarus scotti is "LC", least concern, with no immediate threat to the species' survival. The IUCN status was reviewed in 2010.
