= Cambarus pecki =

Conservation status
- Endangered (IUCN 3.1)

Scientific classification
- Kingdom: Animalia
- Phylum: Arthropoda
- Clade: Pancrustacea
- Class: Malacostraca
- Order: Decapoda
- Suborder: Pleocyemata
- Family: Cambaridae
- Genus: Cambarus
- Species: C. pecki

Binomial name
- Cambarus pecki (Hobbs, 1967)

Synonyms
- Procambarus pecki Hobbs, 1967

Species of crayfish

Cambarus pecki (formerly Procambarus pecki), sometimes called the phantom cave crayfish, is a species of crayfish in the family Cambaridae. It is endemic to Alabama where it is found in three unconnected caves in the Tennessee River drainage in Colbert County, Lauderdale County, and Morgan County.
