= Cambarus hubrichti =

Conservation status
- Data Deficient (IUCN 3.1)

Scientific classification
- Kingdom: Animalia
- Phylum: Arthropoda
- Clade: Pancrustacea
- Class: Malacostraca
- Order: Decapoda
- Suborder: Pleocyemata
- Family: Cambaridae
- Genus: Cambarus
- Species: C. hubrichti

Binomial name
- Cambarus hubrichti Hobbs, 1952

Species of crayfish

Cambarus hubrichti is a species of decapoda in the family Cambaridae. The species goes by the common name Salem cave crayfish.

It is generally an omnivorous species. But, since green plants are scarce in caves it usually eats a proportion of animal meat.

== Occurrence ==
The species is endemic to the Salem Plateau in the southeastern part of Missouri. It is found in the east-central parts of the Ozarks

The species is most often found in cave streams and underground lakes, sometimes it is also found at the mouth of springs. According to the IUCN, in cave streams the species appears to prefer deep pools and siphons fed by submerged passages.

== Threats ==
According to the IUCN the greatest threats to this species is pollution as well as residential and commercial development. In 1981 a pipeline broke causing ammonium fertilizer to leak into the Maramec Spring, resulting in the death of thousands of individuals.

According to the Missouri department of conservation. Since the species is uncommon and has a limited range, it is therefore vulnerable to extirpation as well as extinction. Keeping the groundwater clean is key to help the species survive.
