= Cambarus subterraneus =

Conservation status
- Critically Endangered (IUCN 3.1)

- Critically Imperiled (NatureServe)

Scientific classification
- Kingdom: Animalia
- Phylum: Arthropoda
- Clade: Pancrustacea
- Class: Malacostraca
- Order: Decapoda
- Suborder: Pleocyemata
- Family: Cambaridae
- Genus: Cambarus
- Species: C. subterraneus

Binomial name
- Cambarus subterraneus Hobbs III, 1993

Species of crayfish

Cambarus subterraneus, the Delaware County cave crayfish, is a species of crayfish in the family Cambaridae. It has been found only in three caves in Delaware County, Oklahoma.

The IUCN conservation status of Cambarus subterraneus is "CR", critically endangered. The species faces an extremely high risk of extinction in the immediate future. The IUCN status was reviewed in 2010.
