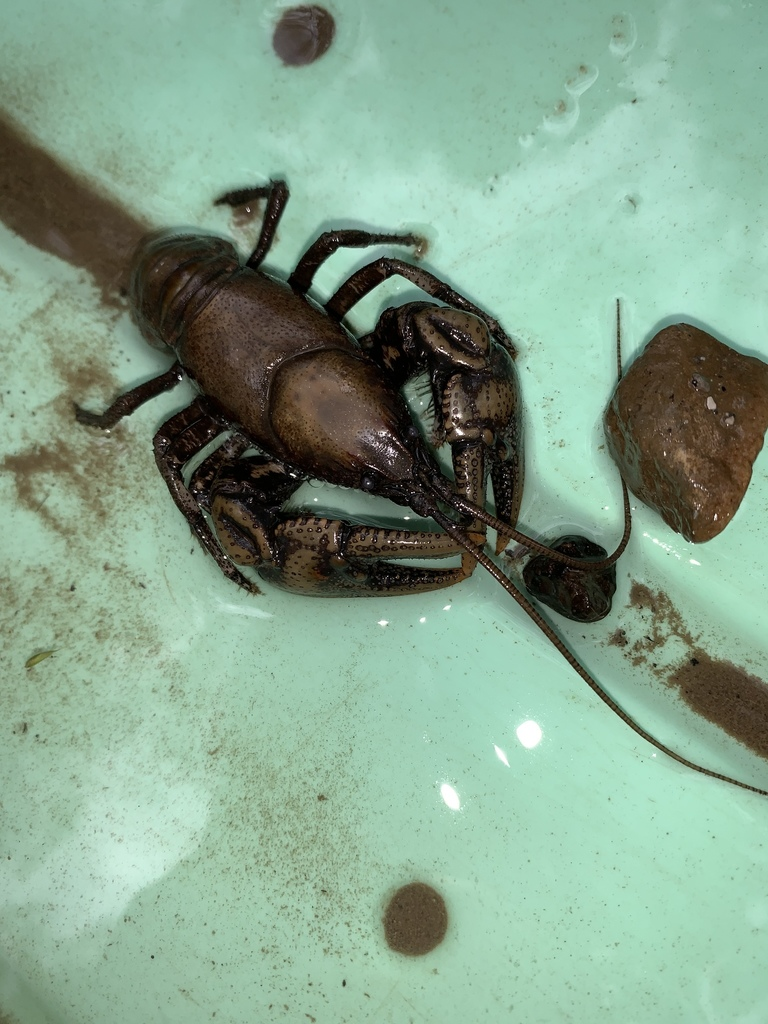

Conservation status
- Least Concern (IUCN 3.1)

- Secure (NatureServe)

Scientific classification
- Kingdom: Animalia
- Phylum: Arthropoda
- Clade: Pancrustacea
- Class: Malacostraca
- Order: Decapoda
- Suborder: Pleocyemata
- Family: Cambaridae
- Genus: Cambarus
- Species: C. carinirostris

Binomial name
- Cambarus carinirostris (Faxon, 1914)

Synonyms
- Cambarus bartonii carinirostris (Hay, 1914)

= Cambarus carinirostris =

Species of crayfish

Cambarus carinirostris, the rock crayfish, is a species of crayfish in the family Cambaridae. It is found in the mid-Atlantic region of the United States.

== Taxonomy ==
Cambarus carinirostris was long considered a subspecies of C. bartonii until its elevation to species level in 1995.

== Description ==
Cambarus carinirostris is moderate sized, with a mean total carapace length of 29.1 millimetres (1.15 in) reported. Dorsally, it is brown or beige, with crimson borders on the abdominal terga. while the ventral surfaces and pereiopods are cream or white in color. The chelae are olive or brown, with cream or yellow propodal tubercles.

== Habitat and distribution ==
Cambarus carinirostris is native to the Monongahela, Ohio, and Allegheny River systems, and can be found from New York to eastern Ohio and central West Virginia. Within this range, it primarily inhabits headwater streams, where it occupies open spaces under benthic debris such as boulders. The rock crayfish is also a prolific secondary burrower, commonly constructing shallow burrows in the soft substrate on the banks of streams.
