= Cambarus batchi =

Conservation status
- Least Concern (IUCN 3.1)

- Vulnerable (NatureServe)

Scientific classification
- Kingdom: Animalia
- Phylum: Arthropoda
- Clade: Pancrustacea
- Class: Malacostraca
- Order: Decapoda
- Suborder: Pleocyemata
- Family: Cambaridae
- Genus: Cambarus
- Species: C. batchi

Binomial name
- Cambarus batchi (Schuster, 1973)

Species of crayfish

Cambarus batchi, the bluegrass crayfish, is a species of crayfish in the family Cambaridae. It is endemic to Kentucky, known as the "Bluegrass State" which lead to the common name.

The IUCN conservation status of Cambarus batchi is "LC", least concern, with no immediate threat to the species' survival. The IUCN status was reviewed in 2010.
