= Cambarus obeyensis =

Conservation status
- Critically Endangered (IUCN 3.1)

Scientific classification
- Kingdom: Animalia
- Phylum: Arthropoda
- Clade: Pancrustacea
- Class: Malacostraca
- Order: Decapoda
- Suborder: Pleocyemata
- Family: Cambaridae
- Genus: Cambarus
- Species: C. obeyensis

Binomial name
- Cambarus obeyensis Hobbs & Shoup, 1947

Species of crayfish

Cambarus obeyensis, the Obey crayfish, is a species of crayfish in the family Cambaridae. It is found in North America.

The IUCN conservation status of Cambarus obeyensis is "CR", critically endangered. The species faces an extremely high risk of extinction in the immediate future. The population is decreasing. The IUCN status was reviewed in 2010.
