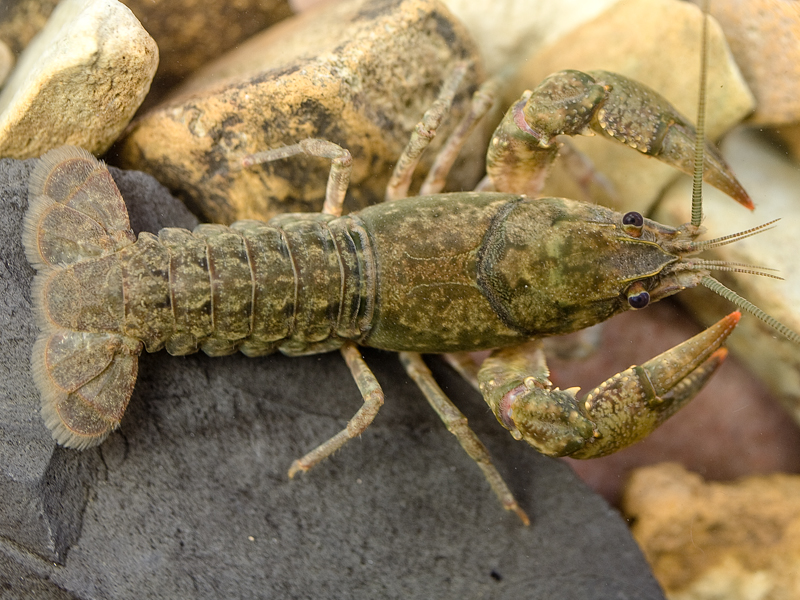

Conservation status
- Least Concern (IUCN 3.1)

- Imperiled (NatureServe)

Scientific classification
- Kingdom: Animalia
- Phylum: Arthropoda
- Clade: Pancrustacea
- Class: Malacostraca
- Order: Decapoda
- Suborder: Pleocyemata
- Family: Cambaridae
- Genus: Cambarus
- Species: C. unestami

Binomial name
- Cambarus unestami Hobbs & Hall, 1969

= Cambarus unestami =

Species of crayfish

Cambarus unestami, the blackbarred crayfish, is a species of crayfish in the family Cambaridae. It is native to Alabama and Georgia in the United States.

The IUCN conservation status of Cambarus unestami is "LC", least concern, with no immediate threat to the species' survival. The IUCN status was reviewed in 2010.
