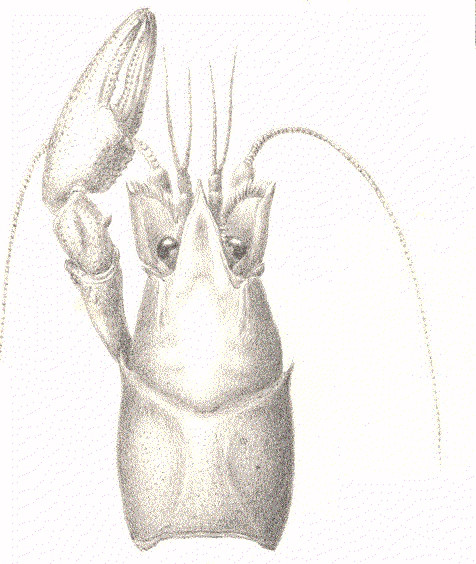

Conservation status
- Least Concern (IUCN 3.1)

Scientific classification
- Kingdom: Animalia
- Phylum: Arthropoda
- Clade: Pancrustacea
- Class: Malacostraca
- Order: Decapoda
- Suborder: Pleocyemata
- Family: Cambaridae
- Genus: Cambarus
- Species: C. acuminatus

Binomial name
- Cambarus acuminatus Faxon, 1884

= Cambarus acuminatus =

Species of crayfish

Cambarus acuminatus, the acuminate crayfish, is a species of crayfish in the family Cambaridae. It is found in eastern North America.

== Taxonomy ==
Cambarus acuminatus was first described in 1884 by Walter Faxon, then a curator of the Invertebrate Department of the Museum of Comparative Zoology (MCZ) at Harvard University, using specimens collected in 1877 from the Saluda River near Greenville, South Carolina by ichthyologist David Starr Jordan and a student named Alembert Brayton. As was common at the time, Faxon's description was brief, focusing on a few diagnostic characters, and lacked illustrations. Two type specimens were deposited with Butler University, but have since been lost. A syntype, which has disintegrated over time, is held by the MCZ

Notable morphological variation between populations of this species have led taxonomists to suggest that crayfish assigned to C. acuminatus actually form a species complex, Cambarus sp. C. The lack of detail in Faxon's original description combined with the loss of the original type material has created an impediment to separation of species within the complex, leading to the description of C. acuminatus sensu stricto from new specimens. These specimens were taken from a location in the Saluda River near where the original type specimens were likely collected.

== Description ==
This species is red-brown to orange-brown. Its size ranges from 13.3 to 21.0 mm.

== Distribution and habitat ==
The known range of this species complex extends from Columbia, South Carolina northward to southeastern Pennsylvania, encompassing much of the Piedmont Plateau and Gulf Coastal Plain. However, C. acuminatus sensu stricto appears to be restricted to the Saluda River Basin in northwestern South Carolina. It prefers third order or higher streams with a steep gradient and pool, riffle, and run habitats. Adults prefer cobble substrates with boulders and slabs, under which they hide, while juveniles can be found in more sheltered areas such as leaf packs, undercut banks, and woody debris.

== Conservation status ==
The population of C. acuminatus sensu stricto appears stable within its range. However, threats to this species do exist. Several kilometers of former habitat in the Saluda River were lost due to the construction of a dam in 1905. Habitat loss will continue to threaten this species due to its restricted range within the Saluda River drainage. At least some parts of its habitat are protected within the Sumter National Forest. Additionally, populations of Procambarus clarkii, an aggressive invader outside of its native range, has been found in the Saluda River. This species often displaces native crayfish species, and could have serious consequences for C. acuminatus.
