= Cambarus pyronotus =

Conservation status
- Data Deficient (IUCN 3.1)

- Imperiled (NatureServe)

Scientific classification
- Kingdom: Animalia
- Phylum: Arthropoda
- Clade: Pancrustacea
- Class: Malacostraca
- Order: Decapoda
- Suborder: Pleocyemata
- Family: Cambaridae
- Genus: Cambarus
- Species: C. pyronotus

Binomial name
- Cambarus pyronotus R.W.Bouchard, 1978

Species of crayfish

Cambarus pyronotus, the fireback crayfish, is a species of crayfish in the family Cambaridae. It is found in North America.
