= Cambarus catagius =

Conservation status
- Data Deficient (IUCN 3.1)

- Imperiled (NatureServe)

Scientific classification
- Kingdom: Animalia
- Phylum: Arthropoda
- Clade: Pancrustacea
- Class: Malacostraca
- Order: Decapoda
- Suborder: Pleocyemata
- Family: Cambaridae
- Genus: Cambarus
- Species: C. catagius

Binomial name
- Cambarus catagius Hobbs & Perkins, 1967

Species of crayfish

Cambarus catagius, the Greensboro burrowing crayfish, is a species of crayfish in the family Cambaridae. It is found only in a limited area of North Carolina, where it is considered a species of special conservation concern.

Despite being named the Greensboro burrowing crayfish, the species inhabits a larger geographic range.
