= Cambarus angularis =

Conservation status
- Least Concern (IUCN 3.1)

- Vulnerable (NatureServe)

Scientific classification
- Kingdom: Animalia
- Phylum: Arthropoda
- Clade: Pancrustacea
- Class: Malacostraca
- Order: Decapoda
- Suborder: Pleocyemata
- Family: Cambaridae
- Genus: Cambarus
- Species: C. angularis

Binomial name
- Cambarus angularis (Hobbs and Bouchard, 1994)

Species of crayfish

Cambarus angularis, the angled crayfish, is a species of crayfish in the family Cambaridae found in Tennessee and Virginia.
