= Cambarus spicatus =

Conservation status
- Data Deficient (IUCN 3.1)

- Vulnerable (NatureServe)

Scientific classification
- Kingdom: Animalia
- Phylum: Arthropoda
- Clade: Pancrustacea
- Class: Malacostraca
- Order: Decapoda
- Suborder: Pleocyemata
- Family: Cambaridae
- Genus: Cambarus
- Species: C. spicatus

Binomial name
- Cambarus spicatus (Hobbs, 1956)

Species of crayfish

Cambarus spicatus, the Broad River spiny crayfish is a species of crayfish in the family Cambaridae. It is endemic to the Carolinas in the United States of America. The common name refers to the Broad River.
