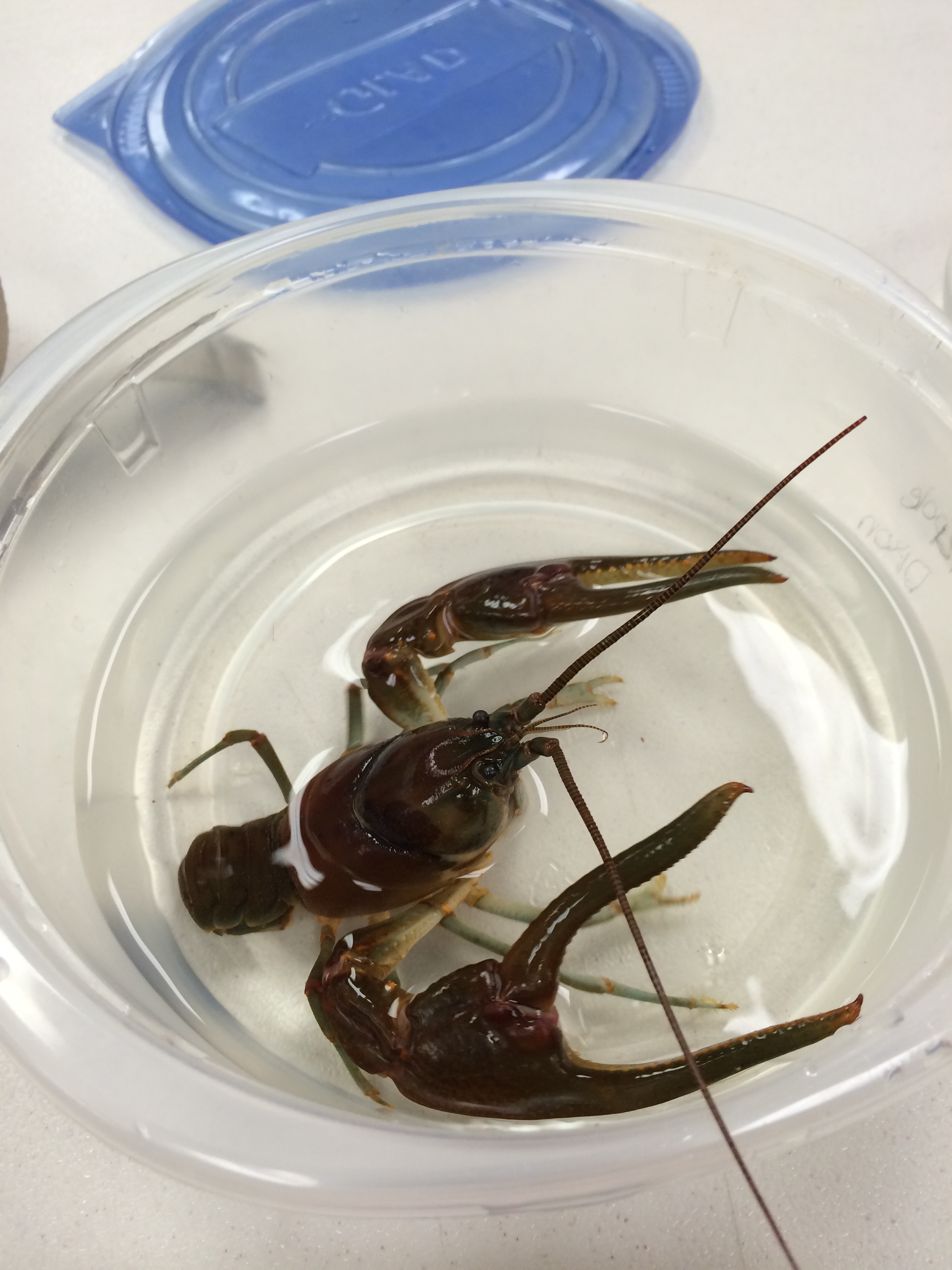

Conservation status
- Least Concern (IUCN 3.1)

Scientific classification
- Kingdom: Animalia
- Phylum: Arthropoda
- Clade: Pancrustacea
- Class: Malacostraca
- Order: Decapoda
- Suborder: Pleocyemata
- Family: Cambaridae
- Genus: Cambarus
- Species: C. chasmodactylus

Binomial name
- Cambarus chasmodactylus (James, 1966)

= Cambarus chasmodactylus =

Species of crayfish

Cambarus chasmodactylus, commonly called the New River crayfish, is a species of crayfish endemic to the New River drainage system
