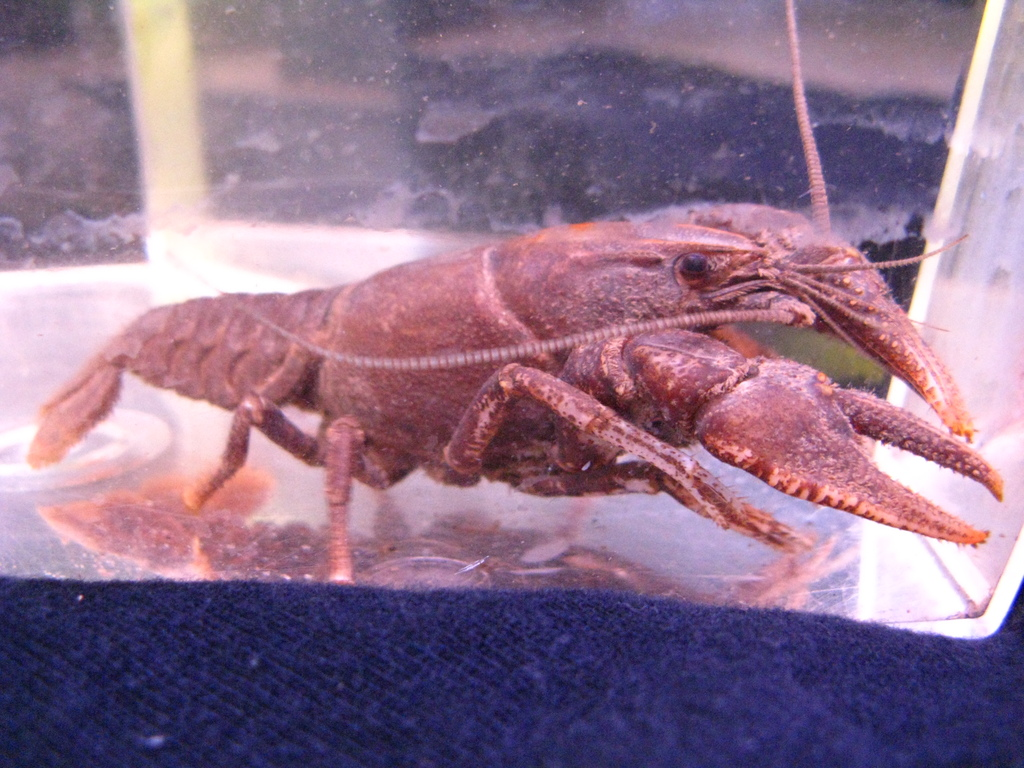

Conservation status
- Least Concern (IUCN 3.1)

- Imperiled (NatureServe)

Scientific classification
- Kingdom: Animalia
- Phylum: Arthropoda
- Clade: Pancrustacea
- Class: Malacostraca
- Order: Decapoda
- Suborder: Pleocyemata
- Family: Cambaridae
- Genus: Cambarus
- Species: C. georgiae

Binomial name
- Cambarus georgiae (Hobbs, 1981)

= Cambarus georgiae =

Species of crayfish

Cambarus georgiae, the Little Tennessee crayfish, is a species of crayfish in the family Cambaridae. It is found in Georgia and North Carolina.

The IUCN conservation status of Cambarus georgiae is "LC", least concern, with no immediate threat to the species' survival. This status was last reviewed in 2010.
