= Common crayfish =

The name common crayfish may refer to different species in different places:

- Astacus astacus, in Europe
- Cambarus bartonii, in North America
- Sagmariasus, in Australasia
