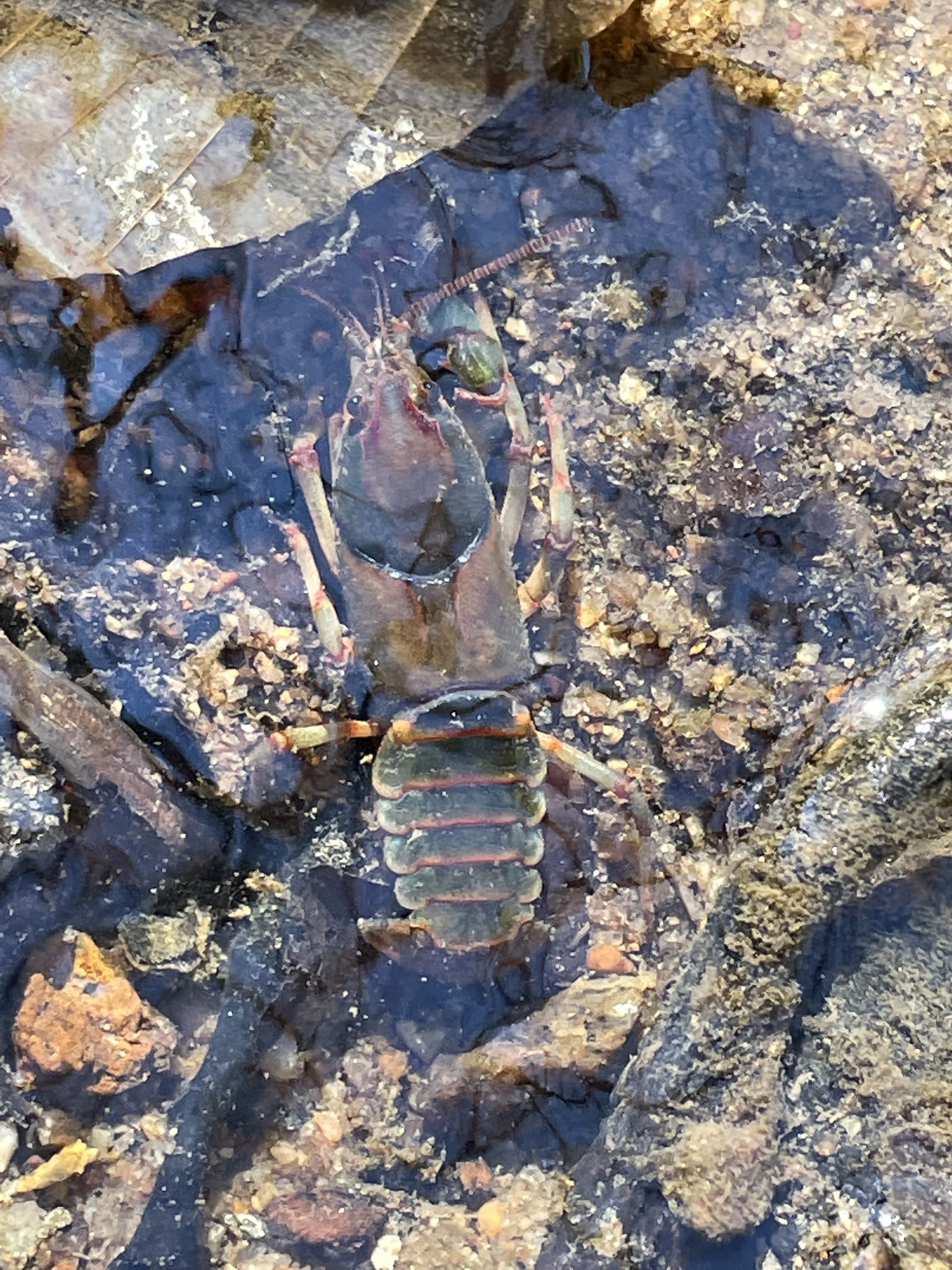

Conservation status
- Least Concern (IUCN 3.1)

- Vulnerable (NatureServe)

Scientific classification
- Kingdom: Animalia
- Phylum: Arthropoda
- Clade: Pancrustacea
- Class: Malacostraca
- Order: Decapoda
- Suborder: Pleocyemata
- Family: Cambaridae
- Genus: Cambarus
- Species: C. howardi

Binomial name
- Cambarus howardi (Hobbs & Hall, 1969)

= Cambarus howardi =

Species of crayfish

Cambarus howardi, the Chattahoochee crayfish, is a species of crayfish in the family Cambaridae. It is found in North America. The common name refers to the Chattahoochee River, where the first specimens were collected.

The IUCN conservation status of Cambarus howardi is "LC", least concern, with no immediate threat to the species' survival. This status was last reviewed in 2010.
