= Cambarus loughmani =

- Unranked (NatureServe)

Scientific classification
- Kingdom: Animalia
- Phylum: Arthropoda
- Clade: Pancrustacea
- Class: Malacostraca
- Order: Decapoda
- Suborder: Pleocyemata
- Family: Cambaridae
- Genus: Cambarus
- Species: C. loughmani

Binomial name
- Cambarus loughmani Foltz, Sadecky, Fetzner and Thoma, 2018

Species of crayfish

Cambarus loughmani, the blue Teays mudbug, is a species of burrowing crayfish endemic to the pre-glacial Teays River Valley in West Virginia. The species was previously considered to be part of the Cambarus dubius complex.
