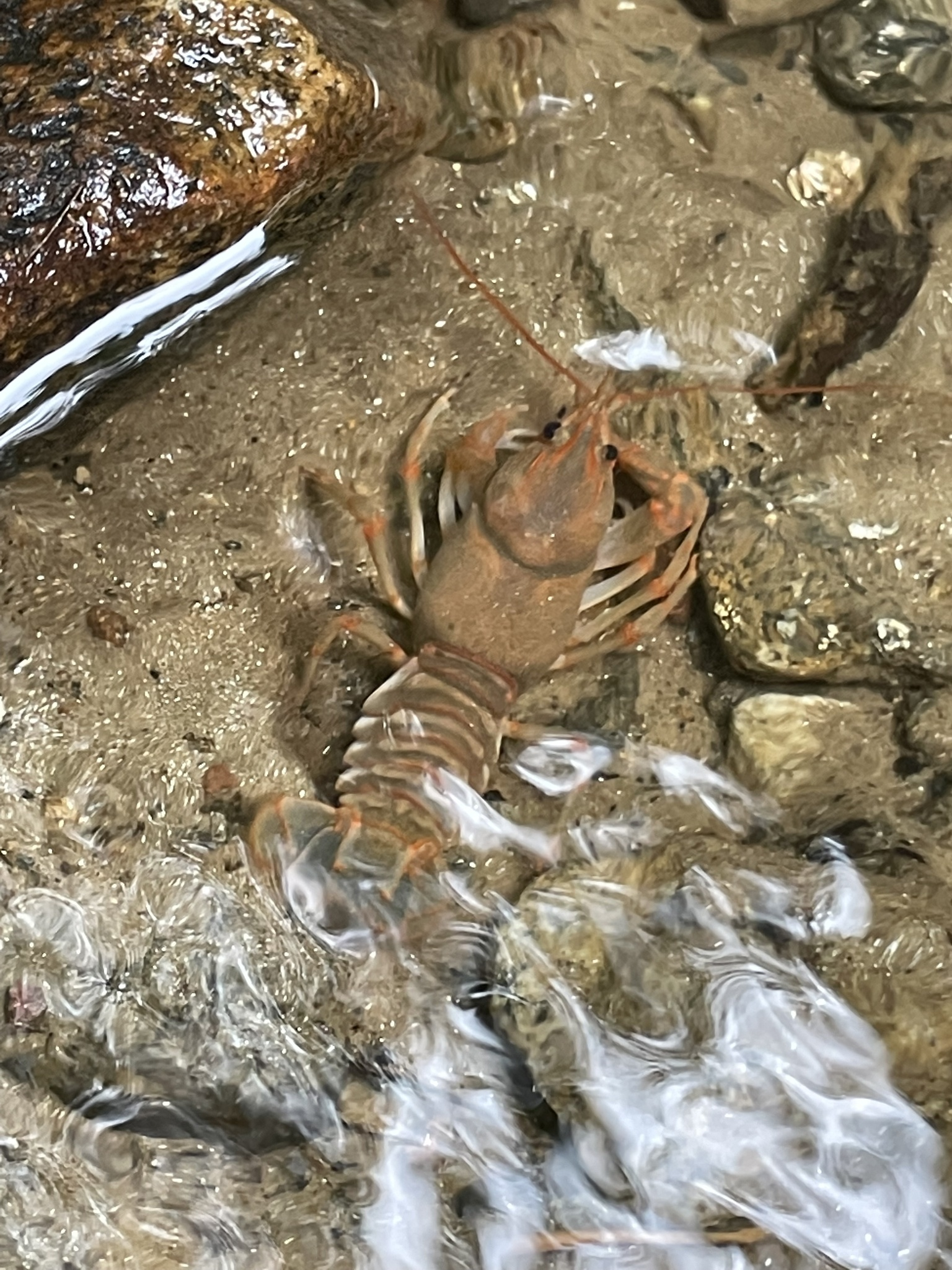
- Etowah Crawfish in Amicalola Stream, Georgia

Conservation status
- Data Deficient (IUCN 3.1)

- Vulnerable (NatureServe)

Scientific classification
- Kingdom: Animalia
- Phylum: Arthropoda
- Clade: Pancrustacea
- Class: Malacostraca
- Order: Decapoda
- Suborder: Pleocyemata
- Family: Cambaridae
- Genus: Cambarus
- Species: C. fasciatus

Binomial name
- Cambarus fasciatus (Hobbs, 1981)

= Cambarus fasciatus =

Species of crayfish

Cambarus fasciatus, the Etowah crayfish, is a species of crayfish in the family Cambaridae. This species is endemic to Georgia, where it is state listed as S2.

== Description ==
The carapace and claw are brownish while the segments of the abdomen have pale centers and rust-orange/red rear edges. The tail fan is often grayish to bluish. Their areola is wide and they have well-developed cervical spines. The rostrum narrows anteriorly, appearing slightly pinched in the middle, with ridges typically of a rust-orange color, and marginal spines are present. The claws of this species may get quite large in proportion to body size, they have somewhat prominent tubercles, and there is a relatively significant gap between the fingers of the claws when the fingers are closed. Many of this species' joints are often of a rust-orange/red color which can be quite distinctive.

== Range ==
This species is only found within the Etowah river system, where it generally is found in small streams and headwaters. They are endemic to the state of Georgia, but they are generally not found below the Allatoona dam.

== Ecology ==
This species is typically found under stones in Lotic habitats, often in mid size to small streams, especially those with rocky bottoms. They are also found on sandy or less rocky bottoms where they are associated with wood debris, leaf aggregations, and any rocks present. These crawfish are nocturnal, and tend to breed around March to May. Female crayfish enter a secluded and secure place to release eggs and attach them to their swimmerets, at which point they are referred to as "in berry". Female crawfish will hold the eggs and the young until their second molt, they have been found with eggs and young during the months of May and June. They molt many times in their first year, and it is suspected they can reach sexual maturity by the end of said first year.
