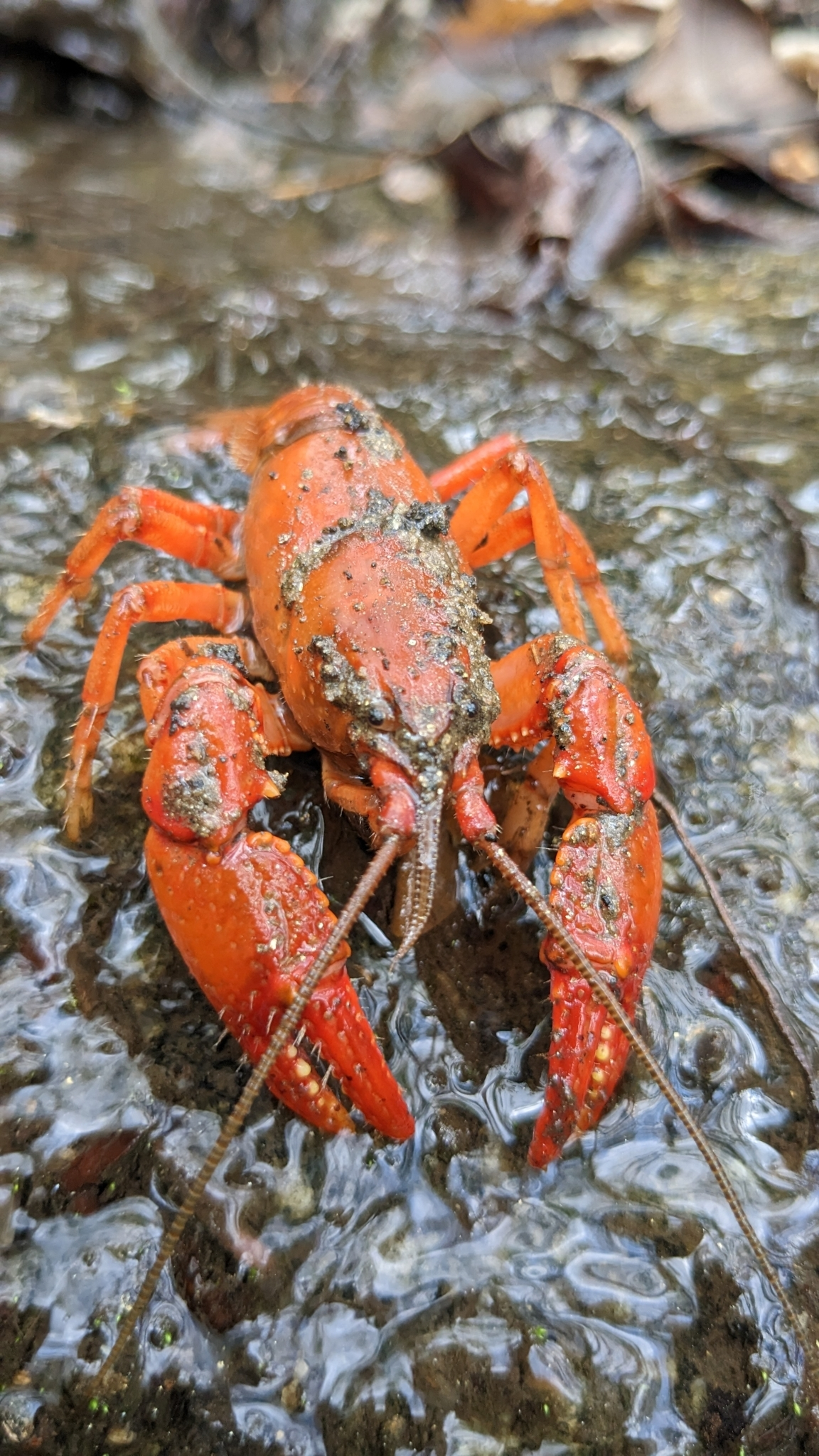

Conservation status
- Least Concern (IUCN 3.1)

- Apparently Secure (NatureServe)

Scientific classification
- Kingdom: Animalia
- Phylum: Arthropoda
- Clade: Pancrustacea
- Class: Malacostraca
- Order: Decapoda
- Suborder: Pleocyemata
- Family: Cambaridae
- Genus: Cambarus
- Species: C. asperimanus

Binomial name
- Cambarus asperimanus Faxon, 1914

= Cambarus asperimanus =

Species of crayfish

Cambarus asperimanus, the mitten crayfish, is a species of crayfish in the family Cambaridae. It is found in North America.

The IUCN conservation status of Cambarus asperimanus is "LC", least concern, with no immediate threat to the species' survival. The IUCN status was reviewed in 2010.
