= Cambarus deweesae =

Conservation status
- Least Concern (IUCN 3.1)

- Secure (NatureServe)

Scientific classification
- Kingdom: Animalia
- Phylum: Arthropoda
- Clade: Pancrustacea
- Class: Malacostraca
- Order: Decapoda
- Suborder: Pleocyemata
- Family: Cambaridae
- Genus: Cambarus
- Species: C. deweesae

Binomial name
- Cambarus deweesae R.W.Bouchard & Etnier, 1979

Species of crayfish

Cambarus deweesae, the valley flame crayfish, is a species of crayfish in the family Cambaridae. It is found in Kentucky and Tennessee.

The IUCN conservation status of Cambarus deweesae is "LC", least concern, with no immediate threat to the species' survival. The IUCN status was reviewed in 2010.
