= Cambarus hiwasseensis =

Conservation status
- Least Concern (IUCN 3.1)

Scientific classification
- Kingdom: Animalia
- Phylum: Arthropoda
- Clade: Pancrustacea
- Class: Malacostraca
- Order: Decapoda
- Suborder: Pleocyemata
- Family: Cambaridae
- Genus: Cambarus
- Species: C. hiwasseensis

Binomial name
- Cambarus hiwasseensis Hobbs, 1981

Species of crayfish

Cambarus hiwasseensis, the Hiwassee crayfish, is a species of crayfish in the family Cambaridae. It is found in North America.

The IUCN conservation status of Cambarus hiwasseensis is "LC", least concern, with no immediate threat to the species' survival. The IUCN status was reviewed in 2010.

== Description ==
Hiwassee Crayfish have an overall light brown color with darker mottling. Each segment of the abdomen is marked with darker scalloped markings, giving the abdomen a slightly striped appearance. The palm has two rows of tubercles along its mesial margin and the areola is wide. The rostrum tapers essentially throughout its length and does not have marginal tubercles. The maximum length of this species is 80 mm (3.1 in).
