= Cambarus pristinus =

Conservation status
- Data Deficient (IUCN 3.1)

- Imperiled (NatureServe)

Scientific classification
- Kingdom: Animalia
- Phylum: Arthropoda
- Clade: Pancrustacea
- Class: Malacostraca
- Order: Decapoda
- Suborder: Pleocyemata
- Family: Cambaridae
- Genus: Cambarus
- Species: C. pristinus

Binomial name
- Cambarus pristinus (Hobbs, 1965)

Species of crayfish

Cambarus pristinus, the pristine crayfish, is a species of crayfish in the family Cambaridae. It is endemic to Tennessee.
