= Cambarus chaugaensis =

Conservation status
- Least Concern (IUCN 3.1)

- Imperiled (NatureServe)

Scientific classification
- Kingdom: Animalia
- Phylum: Arthropoda
- Clade: Pancrustacea
- Class: Malacostraca
- Order: Decapoda
- Suborder: Pleocyemata
- Family: Cambaridae
- Genus: Cambarus
- Species: C. chaugaensis

Binomial name
- Cambarus chaugaensis (Prins & Hobbs, 1969)

Species of crayfish

Cambarus chaugaensis, the Chauga crayfish or Chauga River crayfish, is a species of crayfish in the family Cambaridae. It is endemic to the Carolinas in the United States of America. The common and scientific names refer to the Chauga River of South Carolina, where the first specimens were collected.

The IUCN conservation status of Cambarus chaugaensis is "LC", least concern, with no immediate threat to the species' survival. This status was last reviewed in 2010.
