= Cambarus veitchorum =

Conservation status
- Critically endangered, possibly extinct (IUCN 3.1)

- Critically Imperiled (NatureServe)

Scientific classification
- Kingdom: Animalia
- Phylum: Arthropoda
- Clade: Pancrustacea
- Class: Malacostraca
- Order: Decapoda
- Suborder: Pleocyemata
- Family: Cambaridae
- Genus: Cambarus
- Species: C. veitchorum

Binomial name
- Cambarus veitchorum J. E. Cooper and M. R. Cooper, 1997

Species of crayfish

Cambarus veitchorum, the White Spring cave crayfish, is a small, freshwater crayfish endemic to Limestone County, Alabama in the United States. It is a cave-dwelling species known from only one cave, the White Spring Cave.

It is considered Critically Endangered (Possibly Extinct) by the IUCN Redlist, having not been seen since 1968. A survey carried out in 2007 of its home cave and 26 other caves failed to find any specimens.
