= Cambarus elkensis =

Conservation status
- Vulnerable (IUCN 3.1)

- Vulnerable (NatureServe)

Scientific classification
- Kingdom: Animalia
- Phylum: Arthropoda
- Clade: Pancrustacea
- Class: Malacostraca
- Order: Decapoda
- Suborder: Pleocyemata
- Family: Cambaridae
- Genus: Cambarus
- Species: C. elkensis

Binomial name
- Cambarus elkensis Jezerinac & Stocker, 1993

Species of crayfish

Cambarus elkensis, the Elk River crayfish, is a species of crayfish in the family Cambaridae. It is endemic to West Virginia in the United States.

The IUCN conservation status of Cambarus elkensis is "VU", vulnerable. The species faces a high risk of endangerment in the medium term. The IUCN status was reviewed in 2010.
