= Cambarus nodosus =

Conservation status
- Least Concern (IUCN 3.1)

Scientific classification
- Kingdom: Animalia
- Phylum: Arthropoda
- Clade: Pancrustacea
- Class: Malacostraca
- Order: Decapoda
- Suborder: Pleocyemata
- Family: Cambaridae
- Genus: Cambarus
- Species: C. nodosus

Binomial name
- Cambarus nodosus R.W.Bouchard & Hobbs, 1976

Species of crayfish

Cambarus nodosus is a species of crayfish in the family Cambaridae. It is found in North America.

The IUCN conservation status of Cambarus nodosus is "LC", least concern, with no immediate threat to the species' survival. The IUCN status was reviewed in 2010.
