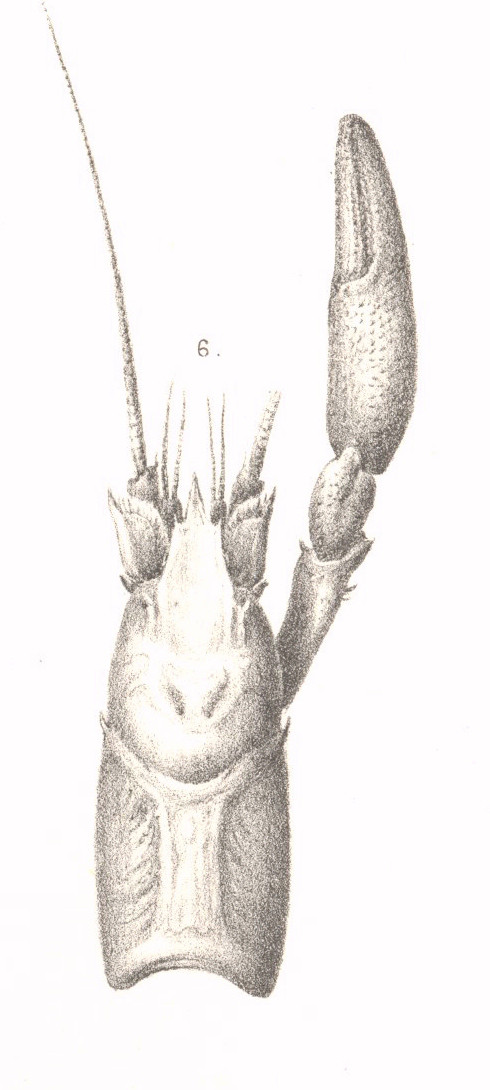

Conservation status
- Least Concern (IUCN 3.1)

- Vulnerable (NatureServe)

Scientific classification
- Kingdom: Animalia
- Phylum: Arthropoda
- Clade: Pancrustacea
- Class: Malacostraca
- Order: Decapoda
- Suborder: Pleocyemata
- Family: Cambaridae
- Genus: Cambarus
- Species: C. hamulatus

Binomial name
- Cambarus hamulatus (Cope and Packard, 1881)

= Cambarus hamulatus =

Species of crayfish

Cambarus hamulatus, the prickly cave crayfish, is a freshwater crayfish native to Tennessee and Alabama in the United States. It is a cave-dwelling species known from 40 caves across its range.
