= Cambarus tartarus =

Conservation status
- Critically Endangered (IUCN 3.1)

- Critically Imperiled (NatureServe)

Scientific classification
- Kingdom: Animalia
- Phylum: Arthropoda
- Clade: Pancrustacea
- Class: Malacostraca
- Order: Decapoda
- Suborder: Pleocyemata
- Family: Cambaridae
- Genus: Cambarus
- Species: C. tartarus

Binomial name
- Cambarus tartarus Hobbs & M. R. Cooper, 1972

Species of crayfish

Cambarus tartarus, the Oklahoma cave crayfish, is a species of crayfish in the family Cambaridae. It is endemic to two caves in Delaware County, Oklahoma in the United States.

The IUCN conservation status of Cambarus tartarus is "CR", critically endangered. The species faces an extremely high risk of extinction in the immediate future. The IUCN status was reviewed in 2010.
