= Cambarus cymatilis =

Conservation status
- Endangered (IUCN 3.1)

- Critically Imperiled (NatureServe)

Scientific classification
- Kingdom: Animalia
- Phylum: Arthropoda
- Clade: Pancrustacea
- Class: Malacostraca
- Order: Decapoda
- Suborder: Pleocyemata
- Family: Cambaridae
- Genus: Cambarus
- Species: C. cymatilis

Binomial name
- Cambarus cymatilis Hobbs, 1970

Species of crayfish

Cambarus cymatilis, the Conasauga blue burrower is a species of burrowing crayfish in the family Cambaridae. It is native to Tennessee and Georgia in the United States. The common name refers to the Conasauga River.

The IUCN conservation status of Cambarus cymatilis is "EN", endangered. The species faces a high risk of extinction in the near future. The IUCN status was reviewed in 2010.
