= Cambarus nerterius =

Conservation status
- Near Threatened (IUCN 3.1)

- Critically Imperiled (NatureServe)

Scientific classification
- Kingdom: Animalia
- Phylum: Arthropoda
- Clade: Pancrustacea
- Class: Malacostraca
- Order: Decapoda
- Suborder: Pleocyemata
- Family: Cambaridae
- Genus: Cambarus
- Species: C. nerterius

Binomial name
- Cambarus nerterius Hobbs, 1964

Species of crayfish

Cambarus nerterius, the Greenbrier cave crayfish, is a species of crayfish in the family Cambaridae. It is endemic to the state of West Virginia in the United States. It is found only in or immediately adjacent to caves in Greenbrier and Pocahontas counties, and is included on the IUCN Red List as a Near Threatened species.
