= Cambarus tenebrosus =

Conservation status
- Least Concern (IUCN 3.1)

- Secure (NatureServe)

Scientific classification
- Kingdom: Animalia
- Phylum: Arthropoda
- Clade: Pancrustacea
- Class: Malacostraca
- Order: Decapoda
- Suborder: Pleocyemata
- Family: Cambaridae
- Genus: Cambarus
- Species: C. tenebrosus

Binomial name
- Cambarus tenebrosus Hay, 1902

Species of crayfish

Cambarus tenebrosus, the cavespring crayfish, is a freshwater crayfish native to Alabama, Kentucky, Tennessee, Ohio and Indiana in the United States. It is a facultative cave-dwelling species known from 84 caves over its range and 20 surface locations in the Cumberland Plateau.
