= Bouchardina =

Conservation status
- Data Deficient (IUCN 3.1)

- Imperiled (NatureServe)

Scientific classification
- Kingdom: Animalia
- Phylum: Arthropoda
- Class: Malacostraca
- Order: Decapoda
- Suborder: Pleocyemata
- Family: Cambaridae
- Genus: Bouchardina; Hobbs, 1977
- Species: B. robisoni

Binomial name
- Bouchardina robisoni Hobbs, 1977

Genus of crayfishes

Bouchardina is a genus of North American crayfish, containing a single species, Bouchardina robisoni, commonly known as Bayou Bodcau crayfish which is named after Henry W. Robison, one of the scientists who found it. It can be found in the bayou basins of southwestern Arkansas, United States. It is not considered to be significantly threatened as its habitat has low human disturbance; it is listed as data deficient on the IUCN Red List, S1 (critically imperiled) by the Nature Conservancy and by NatureServe as G2 (imperiled) and by the American Fisheries Society as vulnerable.

In 2010, research by scientists suggested changing the IUCN status to threatened as it was only known from four counties (Lafayette, Hempstead, Nevada and Columbia County, Arkansas) and only a few specimens had been collected since 1977.
