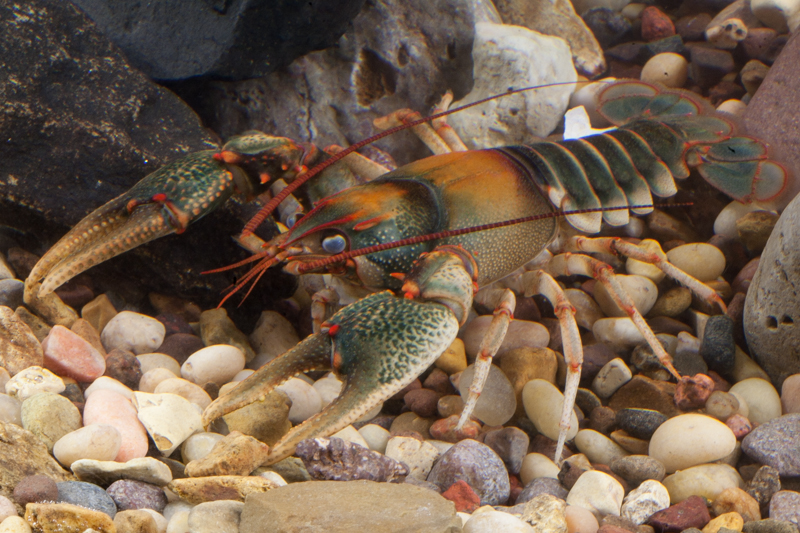
- Cambarus scotti

Scientific classification
- Kingdom: Animalia
- Phylum: Arthropoda
- Clade: Pancrustacea
- Class: Malacostraca
- Order: Decapoda
- Suborder: Pleocyemata
- Family: Cambaridae
- Genus: Cambarus; Erichson, 1846

Type species
- Cambarus bartonii Fabricius, 1798

= Cambarus =

Genus of crayfishes

Cambarus is a large and diverse genus of crayfish from the United States and Canada. The adults range in size from about 5 cm (2.0 in) up to approximately 15 cm (5.9 in).

== Description ==
The genus Cambarus is the second largest freshwater crayfish genus inhabiting the Northern Hemisphere, with only sixty fewer species than the genus Procambarus. Though Cambarus are varied across species, the two terminal elements that make up the male form I gonopod form ninety degree angles with the central appendage, allowing for their identification. Unlike the genus Procambarus whose first pleopod tends to have three processes at the tip, Cambarus has only one or two. Cambarus reach 17–26 mm (0.67–1.02 in) carapace lengths in their first year, while average adult carapace length ranges from 55–62 mm (2.2–2.4 in). The name Cambarus comes from an alteration of Latin cammarus, meaning "lobster".

As a genus containing nearly 100 species, Cambarus's coloration is variable. Cambarus bartonii is dark brown, while species like Cambarus pauleyi range from subtle to vibrant blues and reds. Other species are light green or grayish in color.

== Biogeography ==
Most species of Cambarus are restricted to the United States and Canada. They are distributed along the eastern coast, extending from New Brunswick to northern Florida. However, the genus extends as far westward as the Rocky Mountains of Wyoming and Colorado, inhabiting a variety of freshwater environments.

=== Habitat ===
Cambarus occupy a range of freshwater environments including streams, rivers, lakes, and burrows. Burrowing species of the genus include Cambarus dubius. Cambarus also include many cave-dwelling species, both stygobites and stygophiles. While salinity and temperature changes minimally affect Cambarus, the genus has shown an intolerance to pollution.

== Ecology ==
=== Diet ===
Like other crayfish, Cambarus are foragers. Diets are largely plant-based, though Cambarus also consume small marine organisms like molluscs, larvae, tadpoles and amphibian eggs. Cambarus consume small rodents or birds when available. In their first year, Cambarus typically consume 1-4% of their overall body-weight each day. The genus is central to many freshwater food webs as they help maintain water quality through consumption of algae.

=== Vulnerability ===
One of the largest crayfish genera, Cambarus includes a sizable number of vulnerable species. Cave-dwellers like Cambarus jonesi are at risk due to their lack of genetic diversity and low population count. Other species like Cambarus veteranus are at risk due to human practices like logging and mining, which increase sediment amounts in freshwater environments. Increased sediment causes these freshwater environments to be uninhabitable, and Cambarus are forced to relocate as a result.

=== Growth ===
Molting occurs among Cambarus approximately 5-10 times during their first year, and 3-5 times during subsequent years. Cambarus remain relatively inactive during periods of molting, as the shedding of chitinous exoskeletons leaves them more vulnerable to predation and injury. Many species of Cambarus continue to grow well into adulthood.

=== Reproduction ===
Cambarus typically mate in the early spring. Both Cambarus bartonii and Cambarus robustus only mate once during their three-year life span, with females of both carrying fewer eggs than those of the genus Orconectes.

== Gallery ==
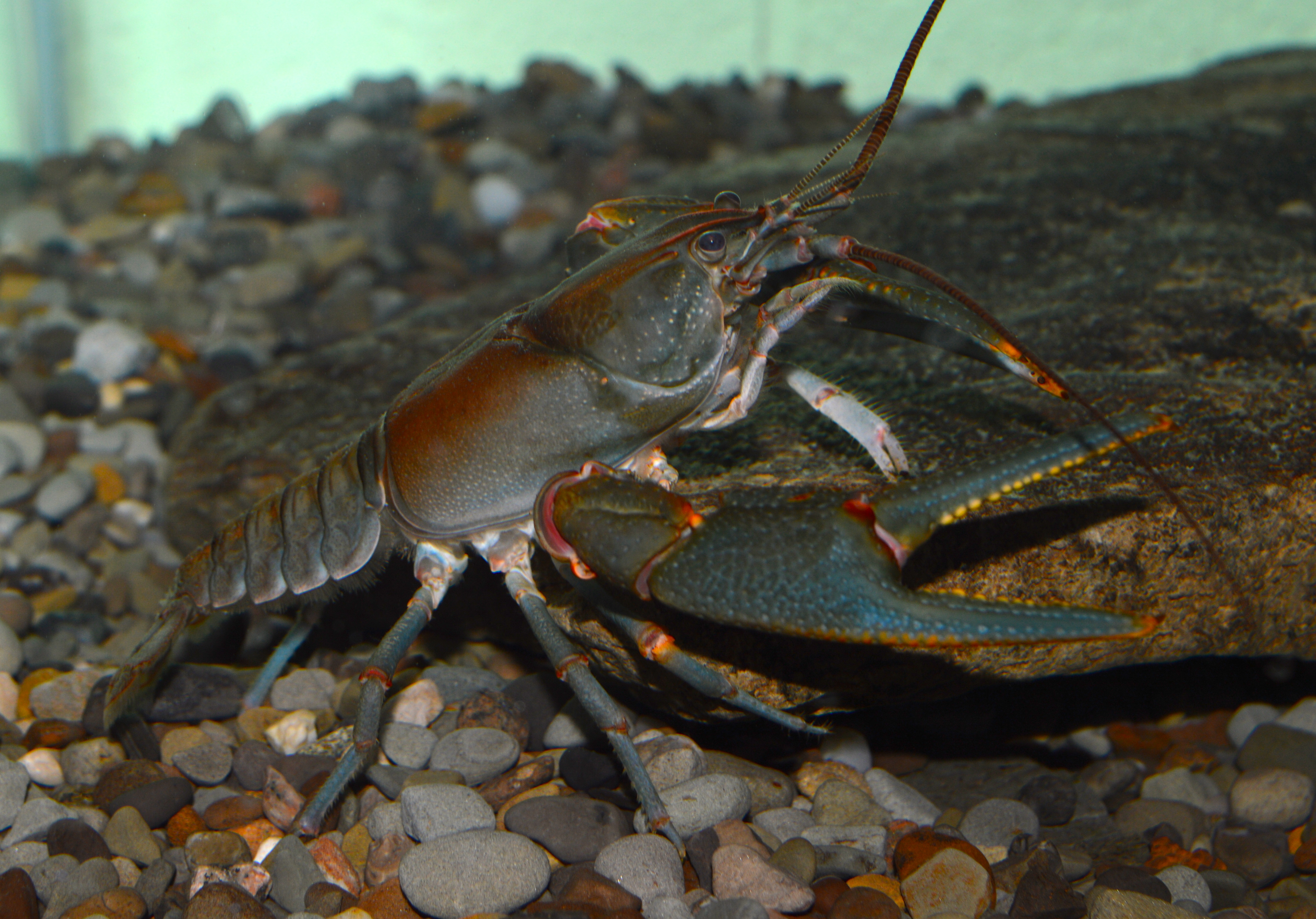
Cambarus callainus

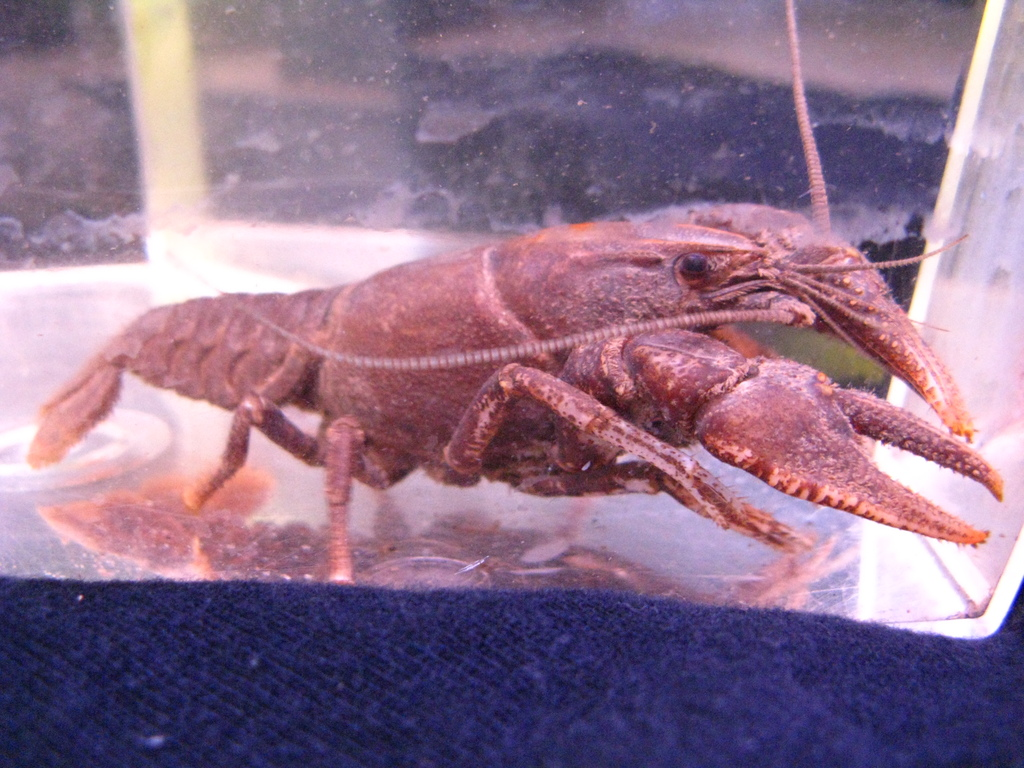
Cambarus georgiae

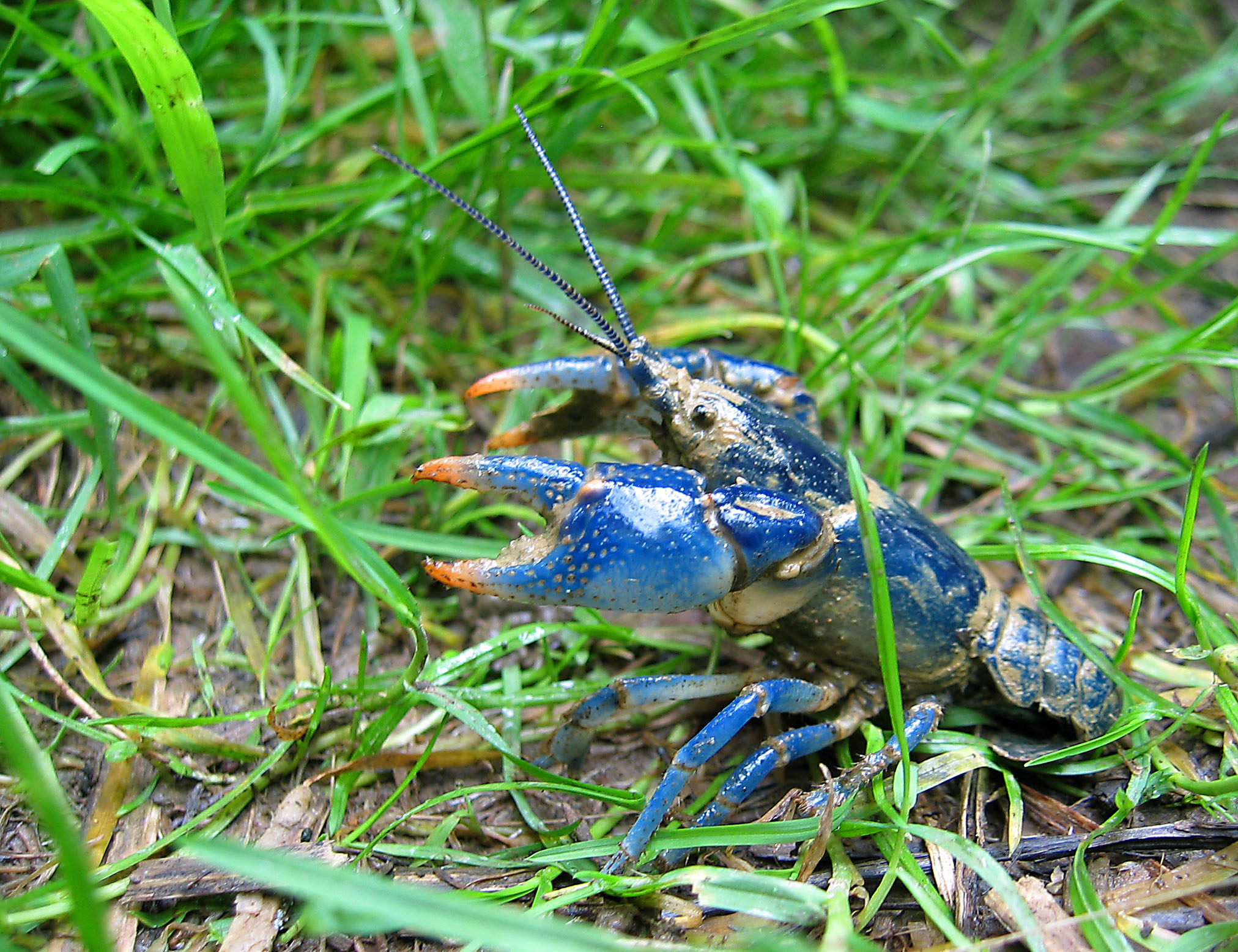
Cambarus monongalensis

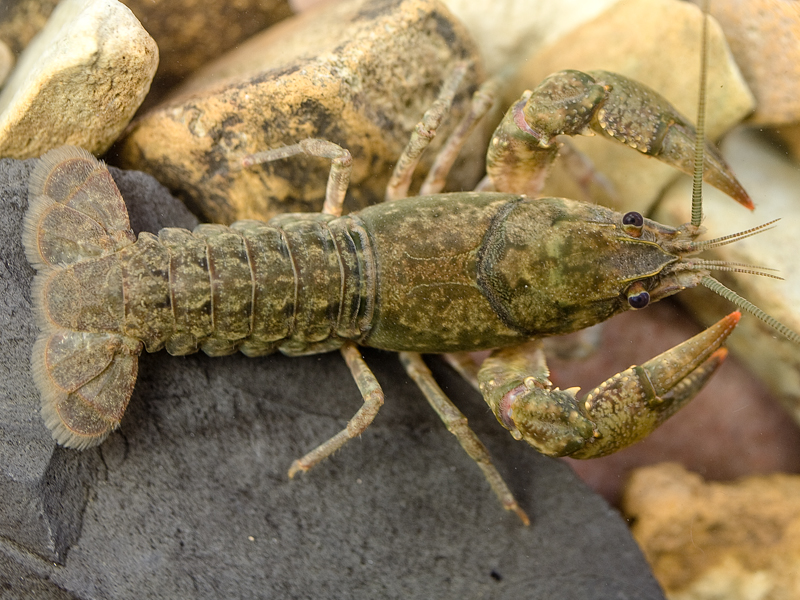
Cambarus unestami

== Classification ==
The genus Cambarus contains around 100 species, many of which are listed on the IUCN Red List. Species in the genus were formerly divided among 12 subgenera. In a 2017 study, these subgenera were found to lack any phylogenetic validity and were therefore eliminated.

- Cambarus aculabrum Hobbs & Brown, 1987 – Benton County cave crayfish
- Cambarus acuminatus Faxon, 1884 - Acuminate Crayfish
- Cambarus adustus Thoma, Fetzner, Stocker and Loughman, 2016 - Dusky Mudbug
- Cambarus aldermanorum J. E. Cooper and Price, 2010
- Cambarus andersoni Jones and Eversole, 2015
- Cambarus angularis Hobbs & R. W. Bouchard, 1994
- Cambarus appalachiensis Loughman, Welsh and Thoma, 2017
- Cambarus asperimanus Faxon, 1914
- Cambarus bartonii (Fabricius, 1798) – Appalachian Brook Crayfish
- Cambarus batchi Schuster, 1973 – bluegrass crayfish
- Cambarus bouchardi Hobbs, 1970 – Big South Fork crayfish
- Cambarus brachydactylus Hobbs, 1953
- Cambarus brimleyorum Cooper, 2006
- Cambarus buntingi R. W. Bouchard, 1973 – Bunting crayfish
- Cambarus callainus Thoma, Loughman & Fetzner, 2014 - Big Sandy crayfish
- Cambarus carinirostris Hay, 1914 – Rock Crayfish
- Cambarus carolinus (Erichson, 1846)
- Cambarus catagius Hobbs & Perkins, 1967 – Greensboro Burrowing Crayfish
- Cambarus causeyi Reimer, 1966
- Cambarus chasmodactylus James, 1966 – New River crayfish
- Cambarus chaugaensis Prins & Hobbs, 1972 – Chauga crayfish
- Cambarus clairitae Schuster and Taylor, 2016
- Cambarus clivosus Taylor, Soucek & Organ, 2006
- Cambarus conasaugaensis Hobbs & Hobbs III, 1962
- Cambarus coosae Hobbs, 1981
- Cambarus coosawattae Hobbs, 1981 – Coosawattae crayfish
- Cambarus cracens R. W. Bouchard & Hobbs, 1976
- Cambarus crinipes R. W. Bouchard, 1973
- Cambarus cryptodytes Hobbs, 1941 – Dougherty Plain cave crayfish
- Cambarus cumberlandensis Hobbs & R. W. Bouchard, 1973 – Cumberland crayfish
- Cambarus cymatilis Hobbs, 1970 – Conasauga blue burrower
- Cambarus davidi J. E. Cooper, 2000 – Carolina Ladle Crayfish
- Cambarus deweesae R. W. Bouchard & Etnier, 1979 – valley flame crayfish
- Cambarus distans Rhoades, 1944 – boxclaw crawfish
- Cambarus diupalma Jones and Eversole, 2015
- Cambarus doughertyensis Cooper & Skelton, 2003 - Dougherty burrowing crayfish
- Cambarus dubius Faxon, 1884 – upland burrowing crayfish
- Cambarus ectopistes Loughman & Williams, 2021
- Cambarus eeseeohensis Thoma, 2005
- Cambarus elkensis Jezerinac & Stocker, 1993 – Elk River crayfish
- Cambarus englishi Hobbs & Hall, 1972
- Cambarus extraneus Hagen, 1870 – Chickamauga crayfish
- Cambarus fasciatus Hobbs, 1981 – Etowah crayfish
- Cambarus fetzneri Loughman, Welsh & Thoma, 2019 – Allegheny Mountain mudbug
- Cambarus friaufi Hobbs, 1953 – hairy crayfish
- Cambarus gentryi Hobbs, 1970
- Cambarus georgiae Hobbs, 1981 – Little Tennessee crayfish
- Cambarus girardianus Faxon, 1884
- Cambarus graysoni Faxon, 1914 – Two-spot crayfish
- Cambarus guenteri Loughman, Henkanaththegedara, Fetzner and Thoma, 2017
- Cambarus halli Hobbs, 1968
- Cambarus hamulatus (Cope, 1881) – Prickly cave crayfish
- Cambarus harti Hobbs, 1981 – Piedmont blue burrower
- Cambarus hatfeildi Z. J. Loughman, 2013
- Cambarus hazardi Loughman, Henkanaththegedara, Fetzner and Thoma, 2017
- Cambarus hiwasseensis Hobbs, 1981 – Hiwassee crayfish
- Cambarus hobbsorum J. E. Cooper, 2001 – Rocky River crayfish
- Cambarus howardi Hobbs & Hall, 1969 – Chattahoochee crayfish
- Cambarus hubbsi Creaser, 1931
- Cambarus hubrichti Hobbs, 1952 – Salem cave crayfish
- Cambarus hystricosus Cooper & Cooper, 2003
- Cambarus jezerinaci Thoma, 2000
- Cambarus johni Cooper, 2006
- Cambarus jonesi Hobbs & Barr, 1960 – Alabama cave crayfish
- Cambarus laconensis Buhay & Crandall, 2009 - Lacon Exit cave crayfish
- Cambarus latimanus (Le Conte, 1856)
- Cambarus lenati J. E. Cooper, 2000 – Broad River crayfish
- Cambarus lentiginosus Jones and Eversole, 2016
- Cambarus longirostris Faxon, 1885
- Cambarus longulus Girard, 1852
- Cambarus loughmani Foltz II et al., 2018 - Blue Teays mudbug
- Cambarus maculatus Hobbs & Pflieger, 1988 – freckled crayfish
- Cambarus magerae Thoma and Fetzner, 2015
- Cambarus manningi Hobbs, 1981
- Cambarus monongalensis Ortmann, 1905 - Monongahela or blue crayfish
- Cambarus nerterius Hobbs, 1964 – Greenbrier cave crayfish
- Cambarus nodosus R. W. Bouchard & Hobbs, 1976
- Cambarus obeyensis Hobbs & Shoup, 1947 – Obey crayfish
- Cambarus obstipus Hall, 1959
- Cambarus ocoeensis Thoma & Williams, 2025
- Cambarus ortmanni Williamson, 1907 – Ortmann mudbug
- Cambarus parrishi Hobbs, 1981 – Hiwassee headwater crayfish
- Cambarus parvoculus Hobbs & Shoup, 1947 – mountain midget crayfish
- Cambarus pauleyi Loughman, Thoma, Fetzner and Stocker, 2015
- Cambarus pecki (Hobbs, 1967) - phantom cave crayfish
- Cambarus polypilosus Loughman & Williams, 2018
- Cambarus pristinus Hobbs, 1965 – pristine crayfish
- Cambarus pyronotus R. W. Bouchard, 1978 – fireback crayfish
- Cambarus reburrus Prins, 1968 – French Broad crayfish
- Cambarus reduncus Hobbs, 1956
- Cambarus reflexus Hobbs, 1981
- Cambarus robustus Girard, 1852 – big water crayfish
- Cambarus rusticiformis Rhoades, 1944 – Depression crayfish
- Cambarus sciotensis Rhoades, 1944 – Teays River crayfish
- Cambarus scotti Hobbs, 1981 – Chattooga crayfish
- Cambarus setosus Faxon, 1889 – bristly cave crayfish
- Cambarus sheltae (J. E. Cooper and M. R. Cooper, 1997) – Shelta Cave crayfish
- Cambarus smilax Loughman, Simon, and Welch, 2011 – Greenbrier crayfish
- Cambarus speciosus Hobbs, 1981
- Cambarus speleocoopi Buhay & Crandall, 2009 - Sweet Home Alabama Crayfish
- Cambarus sphenoides Hobbs, 1968
- Cambarus spicatus Hobbs, 1956 - Broad River spiny crayfish
- Cambarus stockeri Thoma, 2011
- Cambarus striatus Hay, 1902 – Hay Crayfish
- Cambarus strigosus Hobbs, 1981 – lean crayfish
- Cambarus subterraneus Hobbs III, 1993 – Delaware County cave crayfish
- Cambarus tartarus Hobbs & M. R. Cooper, 1972 – Oklahoma cave crayfish
- Cambarus taylori Loughman, Henkanaththegedara, Fetzner and Thoma, 2017
- Cambarus tenebrosus Hay, 1902 – cavespring crayfish
- Cambarus theepiensis Loughman, Foltz, Garrison and Welsh, 2013
- Cambarus truncatus Hobbs, 1981 – Oconee burrowing crayfish
- Cambarus tuckasegee Cooper & Schofield, 2002
- Cambarus unestami Hobbs & Hall, 1969 – Blackbarred crayfish
- Cambarus veitchorum J. E. Cooper & M. R. Cooper, 1997 – White Spring cave crayfish
- Cambarus veteranus Faxon, 1914 – Guyandotte River crayfish
- Cambarus williami R. W. Bouchard & J. W. Bouchard, 1995 – Brawleys Fork crayfish
- Cambarus zophonastes Hobbs & Bedinger, 1964 – Hell Creek cave crayfish
