= Cambarus speleocoopi =

Conservation status
- Endangered (IUCN 3.1)

- Imperiled (NatureServe)

Scientific classification
- Kingdom: Animalia
- Phylum: Arthropoda
- Clade: Pancrustacea
- Class: Malacostraca
- Order: Decapoda
- Suborder: Pleocyemata
- Family: Cambaridae
- Genus: Cambarus
- Species: C. speleocoopi

Binomial name
- Cambarus speleocoopi Buhay & Crandall, 2009

Species of crayfish

Cambarus speleocoopi, the Sweet Home Alabama cave crayfish, is a small, freshwater crayfish endemic to Marshall County, Alabama, in the United States. It is an underground species known only from four caves.

== Distribution ==
The Alabama cave crayfish is known from cave systems in the Paint Rock River basin between Mount St. Olive and Cushion.
