= Cambarus truncatus =

Conservation status
- Near Threatened (IUCN 3.1)

Scientific classification
- Kingdom: Animalia
- Phylum: Arthropoda
- Clade: Pancrustacea
- Class: Malacostraca
- Order: Decapoda
- Suborder: Pleocyemata
- Family: Cambaridae
- Genus: Cambarus
- Species: C. truncatus

Binomial name
- Cambarus truncatus Hobbs, 1981

Species of crayfish

Cambarus truncatus, the Oconee burrowing crayfish, is a species of crayfish in the family Cambaridae. It is found in North America.

The IUCN conservation status of Cambarus truncatus is "NT", near threatened. The species may be considered threatened in the near future. The IUCN status was reviewed in 2010.
