= Cambarus laconensis =

Conservation status
- Critically Endangered (IUCN 3.1)

- Critically Imperiled (NatureServe)

Scientific classification
- Kingdom: Animalia
- Phylum: Arthropoda
- Clade: Pancrustacea
- Class: Malacostraca
- Order: Decapoda
- Suborder: Pleocyemata
- Family: Cambaridae
- Genus: Cambarus
- Species: C. laconensis

Binomial name
- Cambarus laconensis Buhay & Crandall, 2009

Species of crayfish

Cambarus laconensis, the Lacon Exit cave crayfish, is a small, freshwater crayfish endemic to northern Alabama in the United States. It is an underground species known only from a single cave along the southern border of the Highland Rim in the southern Appalachians.
