= Cambarus harti =

Conservation status
- Endangered (IUCN 3.1)

- Critically Imperiled (NatureServe)

Scientific classification
- Kingdom: Animalia
- Phylum: Arthropoda
- Clade: Pancrustacea
- Class: Malacostraca
- Order: Decapoda
- Suborder: Pleocyemata
- Family: Cambaridae
- Genus: Cambarus
- Species: C. harti

Binomial name
- Cambarus harti Hobbs, 1981

Species of crayfish

Cambarus harti, the Piedmont blue burrower, is a species of burrowing crayfish in the family Cambaridae. It is endemic to Georgia in the United States. The common name refers to the Piedmont plateau region.

The IUCN conservation status of Cambarus harti is "EN", endangered. The species faces a high risk of extinction in the near future. The IUCN status was reviewed in 2010.
