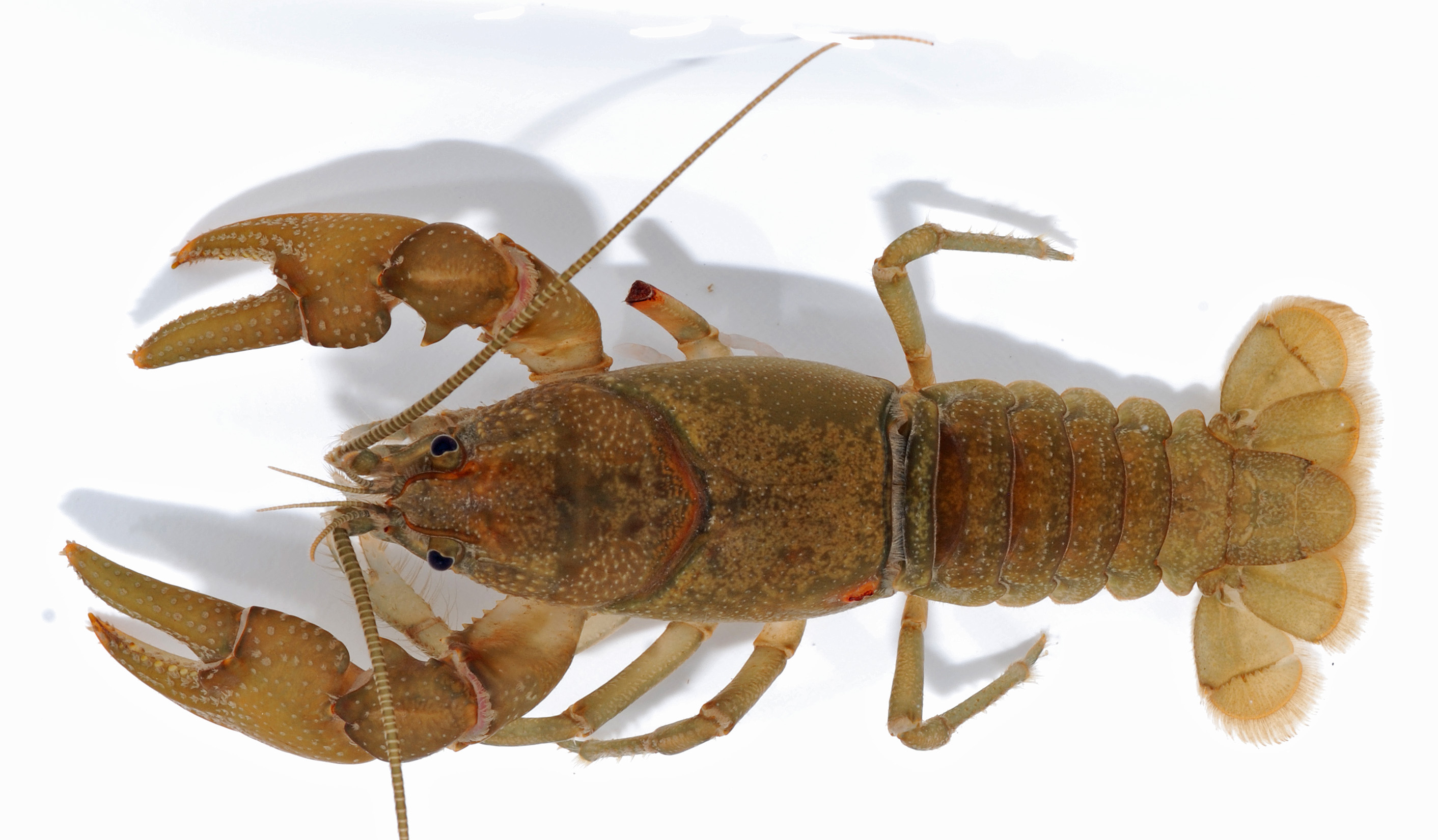

Conservation status
- Least Concern (IUCN 3.1)

- Secure (NatureServe)

Scientific classification
- Kingdom: Animalia
- Phylum: Arthropoda
- Clade: Pancrustacea
- Class: Malacostraca
- Order: Decapoda
- Suborder: Pleocyemata
- Family: Cambaridae
- Genus: Cambarus
- Species: C. bartonii

Binomial name
- Cambarus bartonii (Fabricius, 1798)

Synonyms
- Astacus bartonii; Astacus ciliaris (Rafinesque, 1817); Astacus pusillus (Rafinesque, 1817); Cambarus montanus (Girard, 1852); Cambarus pusillus (Girard, 1852)

= Cambarus bartonii =

Species of crayfish

Cambarus bartonii is a species of crayfish native to eastern North America, where it is called the common crayfish or Appalachian brook crayfish.

Cambarus bartonii was the first crayfish to be described from North America, when Johan Christian Fabricius published it under the name Astacus bartonii in his 1798 work Supplementum entomologiae systematicae. The locality where his specimen was captured is not known, but is thought to be near Philadelphia, Pennsylvania.

Cambarus bartonii lives in fast–flowing, cool, rocky streams as well as shallow lakes, and is found in the Canadian provinces of Ontario, Quebec and New Brunswick, and in the United States from Maine to Alabama. In the south of its range, C. bartonii is restricted to the Appalachian Mountains and their foothills.

Colouration is usually plain dark brown, although mottling is occasionally seen, as is a saddle-shaped marking.

Several subspecies of C. bartonii have been recognised, but it is unclear how advisable this is, and work is ongoing to determine patterns of infraspecific variation.

Cambarus bartonii is included as a species of Least Concern on the IUCN Red List. It is listed as a Species of Special Concern in the state of Connecticut.
