= Cambarus speciosus =

Conservation status
- Near Threatened (IUCN 3.1)

- Imperiled (NatureServe)

Scientific classification
- Kingdom: Animalia
- Phylum: Arthropoda
- Clade: Pancrustacea
- Class: Malacostraca
- Order: Decapoda
- Suborder: Pleocyemata
- Family: Cambaridae
- Genus: Cambarus
- Species: C. speciosus

Binomial name
- Cambarus speciosus (Hobbs, 1981)

Species of crayfish

Cambarus speciosus, the beautiful crayfish, is a species of crayfish in the family Cambaridae. It is endemic to Georgia.

The IUCN conservation status of Cambarus speciosus is "NT", near threatened. The species may be considered threatened in the near future. The population is stable. This status was last reviewed in 2010.
