= Cambarus bouchardi =

Conservation status
- Near Threatened (IUCN 3.1)

Scientific classification
- Kingdom: Animalia
- Phylum: Arthropoda
- Clade: Pancrustacea
- Class: Malacostraca
- Order: Decapoda
- Suborder: Pleocyemata
- Family: Cambaridae
- Genus: Cambarus
- Species: C. bouchardi

Binomial name
- Cambarus bouchardi Hobbs, 1970

Species of crustacean

Cambarus bouchardi, the Big South Fork crayfish, is a species of crayfish in the family Cambaridae. It is native to North America.

The IUCN conservation status of Cambarus bouchardi is classified as "NT" (Near Threatened). The species may be considered threatened in the near future. The IUCN status was last reviewed in 2010.
