= Cambarus coosawattae =

Conservation status
- Near Threatened (IUCN 3.1)

- Imperiled (NatureServe)

Scientific classification
- Kingdom: Animalia
- Phylum: Arthropoda
- Clade: Pancrustacea
- Class: Malacostraca
- Order: Decapoda
- Suborder: Pleocyemata
- Family: Cambaridae
- Genus: Cambarus
- Species: C. coosawattae

Binomial name
- Cambarus coosawattae (Hobbs, 1981)

Species of crayfish

Cambarus coosawattae, the Coosawattae crayfish, is a species of crayfish in the family Cambaridae. It is endemic to Georgia. The common name refers to the Coosawattee River, with the original specimens being collected in the Cartecay River which combines with another river to form the Coosawattee.

The IUCN conservation status of Cambarus coosawattae is "NT", near threatened. The species may be considered threatened in the near future. The population is stable. The IUCN status was reviewed in 2010.
