= Cambarus williami =

Conservation status
- Near Threatened (IUCN 3.1)

- Imperiled (NatureServe)

Scientific classification
- Kingdom: Animalia
- Phylum: Arthropoda
- Clade: Pancrustacea
- Class: Malacostraca
- Order: Decapoda
- Suborder: Pleocyemata
- Family: Cambaridae
- Genus: Cambarus
- Species: C. williami

Binomial name
- Cambarus williami (R.W.Bouchard & J.W.Bouchard, 1995)

Species of crayfish

Cambarus williami, the Brawleys Fork crayfish, is a species of crayfish in the family Cambaridae. It is endemic to Tennessee.

The IUCN conservation status of Cambarus williami is "NT", near threatened. The species may be considered threatened in the near future. The IUCN status was reviewed in 2010.
