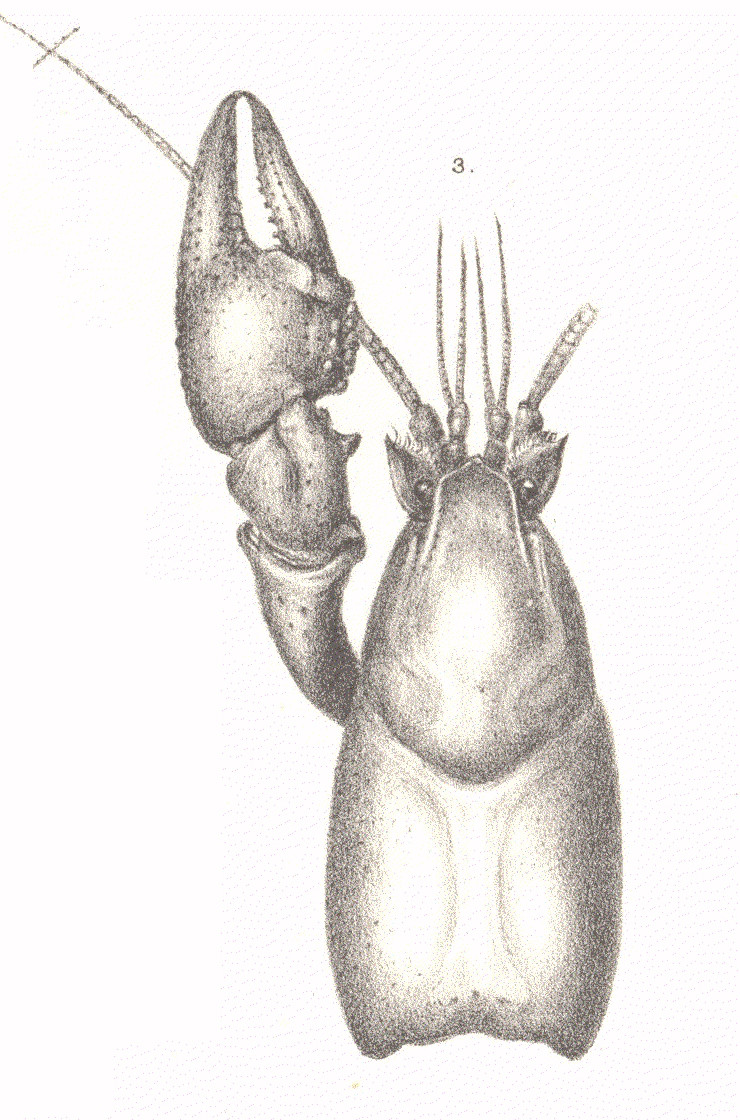

Conservation status
- Least Concern (IUCN 3.1)

- Secure (NatureServe)

Scientific classification
- Kingdom: Animalia
- Phylum: Arthropoda
- Clade: Pancrustacea
- Class: Malacostraca
- Order: Decapoda
- Suborder: Pleocyemata
- Family: Cambaridae
- Genus: Cambarus
- Species: C. dubius

Binomial name
- Cambarus dubius Faxon, 1884

= Cambarus dubius =

Species of crayfish

Cambarus dubius, the Upland burrowing crayfish, is a species of burrowing crayfish native to Kentucky, Tennessee, Virginia and North Carolina in the United States.

It is believed to form a species complex.
