= Entocytheridae =

Scientific classification
- Domain: Eukaryota
- Kingdom: Animalia
- Phylum: Arthropoda
- Class: Ostracoda
- Order: Podocopida
- Family: Entocytheridae

Family of crustaceans

Entocytheridae is a family of freshwater crustaceans belonging to the order Podocopida. The family lives as ectosymbionts on other crustaceans.

== Genera ==
Genera:

- Aitkenicythere Bate, 1976
- Ankylocythere Hart, 1962
- Argentodromas Diaz & Martens, 2018
