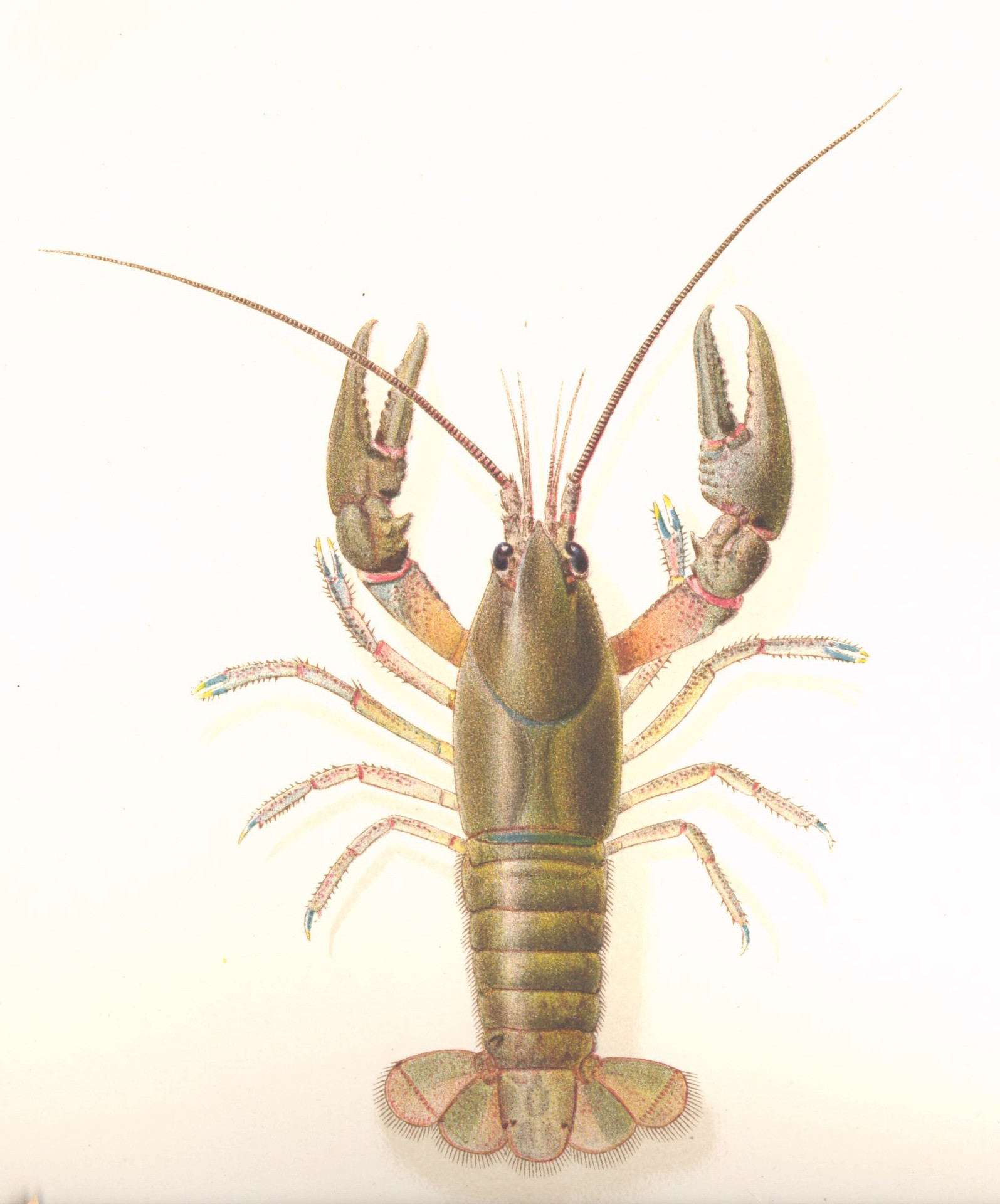

Conservation status
- Least Concern (IUCN 3.1)

- Secure (NatureServe)

Scientific classification
- Kingdom: Animalia
- Phylum: Arthropoda
- Clade: Pancrustacea
- Class: Malacostraca
- Order: Decapoda
- Suborder: Pleocyemata
- Family: Cambaridae
- Genus: Cambarus
- Species: C. robustus

Binomial name
- Cambarus robustus Girard, 1852

Synonyms
- Cambarus bartonii robustus

= Cambarus robustus =

Species of crayfish

Cambarus robustus, known generally as the robust crayfish or Big Water crayfish, is a species of crayfish in the family Cambaridae. It is found in North America.

The IUCN conservation status of Cambarus robustus is "LC", least concern, with no immediate threat to the species' survival. The population is stable. The IUCN status was reviewed in 2010.
