= Cambarus setosus =

Conservation status
- Near Threatened (IUCN 3.1)

- Vulnerable (NatureServe)

Scientific classification
- Kingdom: Animalia
- Phylum: Arthropoda
- Clade: Pancrustacea
- Class: Malacostraca
- Order: Decapoda
- Suborder: Pleocyemata
- Family: Cambaridae
- Genus: Cambarus
- Species: C. setosus

Binomial name
- Cambarus setosus Faxon & Garman, 1889

Synonyms
- Cambarus ayersii Steele, 1902

Species of crayfish

Cambarus setosus, the bristly cave crayfish, is a freshwater crayfish native to Missouri and Arkansas in the United States. It is a cave-dwelling species known from 164 localities with the majority on the Springfield Plateau in southwestern Missouri.
