= Blue lobster =

Blue lobster may refer to either:

- Procambarus alleni, a blue crayfish commonly called a blue lobster
- Cherax quadricarinatus, another blue crayfish, common in aquaria
- Homarus gammarus, the European or common lobster, which is blue while alive (but becomes red when cooked)
- A mutated form of the American lobster
