= Troglocambarus =

Conservation status
- Near Threatened (IUCN 3.1)

- Critically Imperiled (NatureServe)

Scientific classification
- Kingdom: Animalia
- Phylum: Arthropoda
- Class: Malacostraca
- Order: Decapoda
- Suborder: Pleocyemata
- Family: Cambaridae
- Genus: Troglocambarus; Hobbs, 1942
- Species: T. maclanei

Binomial name
- Troglocambarus maclanei Hobbs, 1942

Genus of crayfishes

Troglocambarus is a monotypic genus of troglobitic crayfish, endemic to Florida. Troglocambarus maclanei is found underground in Hernando, Marion, Alachua, Columbia, Gilchrist and Suwanee counties, and is named after Mr. William A. McLane who first collected it. It is commonly called the North Florida Spider Cave crayfish.

Troglocambarus is believed to be the sister group to Procambarus. It is only found in subterranean waters and was first recorded in Squirrel Chimney, 11 miles north-west of Gainesville, Florida. T. maclanei has no body pigment. It is distinguished from other genera by the great enlargement of the third maxillipeds. It is unknown what T. maclanei feeds on.

Troglocambarus maclanei is listed as "Critically Imperiled" by NatureServe, and as Near Threatened on the IUCN Red List.
