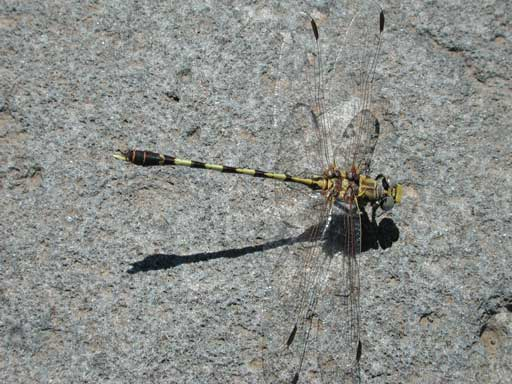

Scientific classification
- Kingdom: Animalia
- Phylum: Arthropoda
- Clade: Pancrustacea
- Class: Insecta
- Order: Odonata
- Infraorder: Anisoptera
- Family: Gomphidae
- Genus: Progomphus
- Species: P. borealis

Binomial name
- Progomphus borealis McLachlan in Selys, 1873

= Gray sanddragon =

Species of dragonfly

Progomphus borealis is a species of dragonfly in the family Gomphidae. This dragonfly species is commonly known as the gray sanddragon.

== Identification ==
=== Adult ===
The gray sanddragon is a medium to large dragonfly with a maximum length of 2.25 to 2.44 inches (57 to 62 mm). Its face and thorax are grayish to yellowish brown, and its thorax may be marked with black. The abdomen of this dragonfly is black and marked with yellow on the top of every segment. Under the tip of the abdomen is marked with yellow as well, and the abdominal tip is swollen as in other members of this family.

=== Nymph ===
The nymph of the gray sanddragon is large in size with a length of 1 inch (25 mm). This dragonfly nymph is sandy brown in color and has short legs covered with stiff bristles. Its abdomen turns up at the tip, and there is a single, rear-facing spine on every side of abdominal segments three through nine.

== Distribution ==
Gray sanddragons can be found in Arizona, California, Chihuahua, Idaho, Jalisco, New Mexico, Oregon, Texas, U.S. Virgin Islands, and Washington. In Idaho these dragonflies can be found at desert streams in the southwest corner of the state.

== Habitat ==
The gray sanddragon found along sandy streams, river, and lakes in desert areas. Nymphs often burrow under the sandy sediment and will swim upstream to escape drought.

== Flight season ==
Gray sanddragons are commonly fly from early June to September. They will also fly from April to October.

== Diet ==
=== Adult ===
This species of dragonfly will eat almost any soft-bodied flying insect such as mosquitoes, flies, butterflies, moths, mayflies, and flying ants or termites.

=== Nymph ===
The nymphs of gray sanddragon feed on a wide variety of aquatic insects, including mosquito larvae, other aquatic fly larvae, mayfly larvae, and freshwater shrimp. They will sometimes eat small fish and tadpoles.

== Ecology ==
Nymphs can be very selective in choosing their habitat choices and will often occur only in certain stretches of a particular river or stream. The upturned tip of their abdomen is exposed when they burrow into the sand. This strategy allows them to breathe while buried by pumping water in and out of the tip of the abdomen. Unlike most other species, the gray sanddragon nymphs emerge as adults during the day. Although many records are sparse, the adults are believed to fly from early June to September. Gray sanddragons can't tolerate cooler temperatures and are rarely seen flying on cool or cloudy days.

== Reproduction ==
After both male and female mate, the female flies singly, without the male attached to her, and then she lays her eggs by dipping the tip of her abdomen in the shallows of small streams while hovering above it.

== Similar species ==
Many sanddragons are readily identifiable because of the bright yellow cerci. The gray sanddragon looks similar to the smaller common sanddragon which has two dark lateral thoracic stripes and more brown basally in the wings.
