= Euorodalus paracoenosus =

Scientific classification
- Kingdom: Animalia
- Phylum: Arthropoda
- Clade: Pancrustacea
- Class: Insecta
- Order: Coleoptera
- Suborder: Polyphaga
- Infraorder: Scarabaeiformia
- Family: Scarabaeidae
- Genus: Euorodalus
- Species: E. paracoenosus

Binomial name
- Euorodalus paracoenosus (Balthasar & Hrubant, 1960)

Synonyms
- Aphodius (Orodalus) paracoenosus Balthasar & Hrubant, 1960; Euorodalus paracoenosus fallaciosus Dellacasa & Dellacasa, 2005; Aphodius (Euorodalus) paracoenosus parafallax Dellacasa, 1983; Aphodius (Euorodalus) paracoenosus paramirandus Dellacasa, 1983]; Aphodius (Euorodalus) paracoenosus parapellucidus Dellacasa, 1983; Aphodius (Euorodalus) paracoenosus paratristis Dellacasa, 1983; Aphodius (Orodalus) paracoenosus paravicinus Petrovitz, 1967; Aphodius (Orodalus) paracoenosus parascapularis Balthasar & Hrubant, 1960

Species of beetle

Euorodalus paracoenosus is a species of beetle of the family Scarabaeidae. It is found in Albania, Armenia, Austria, Azerbaijan, Belarus, Bosnia Herzegovina, Bulgaria, Croatia, the Czech Republic, France, Georgia, Germany, Greece, Hungary, Iran, Italy, Macedonia, Moldova, Montenegro, Poland, Romania, Russia, Serbia, Slovakia, Slovenia, Switzerland, Turkey and Ukraine.

== Description ==
Adults reach a length of about 4.3–4.5 mm (0.17–0.18 in). They are very similar to Euorodalus coenosus.
