= Alocoderus machatschkei =

Scientific classification
- Kingdom: Animalia
- Phylum: Arthropoda
- Clade: Pancrustacea
- Class: Insecta
- Order: Coleoptera
- Suborder: Polyphaga
- Infraorder: Scarabaeiformia
- Family: Scarabaeidae
- Genus: Alocoderus
- Species: A. machatschkei

Binomial name
- Alocoderus machatschkei (Balthasar, 1960)

Synonyms
- Aphodius (Alocoderus) machatschkei Balthasar, 1960

Species of beetle

Alocoderus machatschkei is a species of beetle of the family Scarabaeidae. It is found in western Iraq.

== Description ==
Adults reach a length of about 6.5 mm (0.26 in). They have an elongate, nearly parallel-sides, shining, nearly glabrous body. The head and pronotum are dark brown, while the sides of the clypeus and the lateral margins of the pronotum are reddish-yellow. The scutellum and elytra are yellow, with the suture of the latter darkened. The underside is largely dark, but the legs are light-colored. The sides of the head and pronotum have long, yellow cilia.
