= Alocoderus =

Scientific classification
- Kingdom: Animalia
- Phylum: Arthropoda
- Clade: Pancrustacea
- Class: Insecta
- Order: Coleoptera
- Suborder: Polyphaga
- Infraorder: Scarabaeiformia
- Family: Scarabaeidae
- Subfamily: Aphodiinae
- Tribe: Aphodiini
- Genus: Alocoderus; Schmidt, 1914

Synonyms
- Aphodius (Alocoderus) Schmidt, 1914

Genus of beetles

Alocoderus is a genus of beetles of the family Scarabaeidae.

== Species ==
- Alocoderus baleensis Bordat, 2005
- Alocoderus ballerioi (Bordat, 1997)
- Alocoderus carinifrons (Reitter, 1892)
- Alocoderus decrepidus (Petrovitz, 1975)
- Alocoderus digitalis (Koshantschikov, 1894)
- Alocoderus elongatulus (Fabricius, 1801)
- Alocoderus gilleti (Schmidt, 1909)
- Alocoderus holdereri (Reitter, 1900)
- Alocoderus hydrochaeris (Fabricius, 1798)
- Alocoderus imitator (Koshanschikov, 1916)
- Alocoderus luangensis (Emberson & Stebnicka, 2001)
- Alocoderus machatschkei (Balthasar, 1960)
- Alocoderus mineti Clément, 1981
- Alocoderus semenowi (Reitter, 1887)
- Alocoderus semienensis (Bordat, 1990)
- Alocoderus strigimargo (Reitter, 1892)
- Alocoderus teyrovskyi (Balthasar, 1935)
- Alocoderus turbatus (Baudi, 1870)
- Alocoderus volubilis (Balthasar, 1961)
- Alocoderus wolfgangi (Stebnicka, 1990)
