= Euorodalus signifer =

Scientific classification
- Kingdom: Animalia
- Phylum: Arthropoda
- Clade: Pancrustacea
- Class: Insecta
- Order: Coleoptera
- Suborder: Polyphaga
- Infraorder: Scarabaeiformia
- Family: Scarabaeidae
- Genus: Euorodalus
- Species: E. signifer

Binomial name
- Euorodalus signifer (Mulsant & Rey, 1870)

Synonyms
- Aphodius signifer Mulsant & Rey, 1870

Species of beetle

Euorodalus signifer is a species of beetle of the family Scarabaeidae. It is found in Egypt, Israel, Libya and Syria.

== Description ==
Adults reach a length of about 3.5–4 mm (0.14–0.16 in). They have a shiny body, with the head, pronotum and scutellum black or blackish-brown and with the sides of the pronotum lighter. The elytra are yellowish-brown with blackened stripes and dark spots. The legs are brown.
