= Azuragrion vansomereni =

Conservation status
- Least Concern (IUCN 3.1)

Scientific classification
- Kingdom: Animalia
- Phylum: Arthropoda
- Class: Insecta
- Order: Odonata
- Suborder: Zygoptera
- Family: Coenagrionidae
- Genus: Azuragrion
- Species: A. vansomereni

Binomial name
- Azuragrion vansomereni (Pinhey, 1956)

Species of damselfly

Azuragrion vansomereni is a species of damselfly in family Coenagrionidae. It is found in Cameroon, Ivory Coast, Ethiopia, Gambia, Ghana, Nigeria, Senegal, Sudan, Togo, Uganda, and possibly Angola. Its natural habitats are dry savanna, moist savanna, subtropical or tropical dry shrubland, subtropical or tropical moist shrubland, subtropical or tropical dry lowland grassland, freshwater marshes, and intermittent freshwater marshes.
