= Anomius segonzaci =

Scientific classification
- Kingdom: Animalia
- Phylum: Arthropoda
- Clade: Pancrustacea
- Class: Insecta
- Order: Coleoptera
- Suborder: Polyphaga
- Infraorder: Scarabaeiformia
- Family: Scarabaeidae
- Genus: Anomius
- Species: A. segonzaci

Binomial name
- Anomius segonzaci (Bedel, 1904)

Synonyms
- Aphodius segonzaci Bedel, 1904; Aphodius (Anomius) pardoalcaidei Petrovitz, 1971

Species of beetle

Anomius segonzaci is a species of beetle of the family Scarabaeidae. It is found in Algeria and Morocco.

== Description ==
Adults reach a length of about 5–6.2 mm (0.20–0.24 in). They have a moderately convex, glossy, glabrous body, with the head, pronotum and scutellum black-brown, while the elytra are somewhat lighter brown to light reddish-brown.
