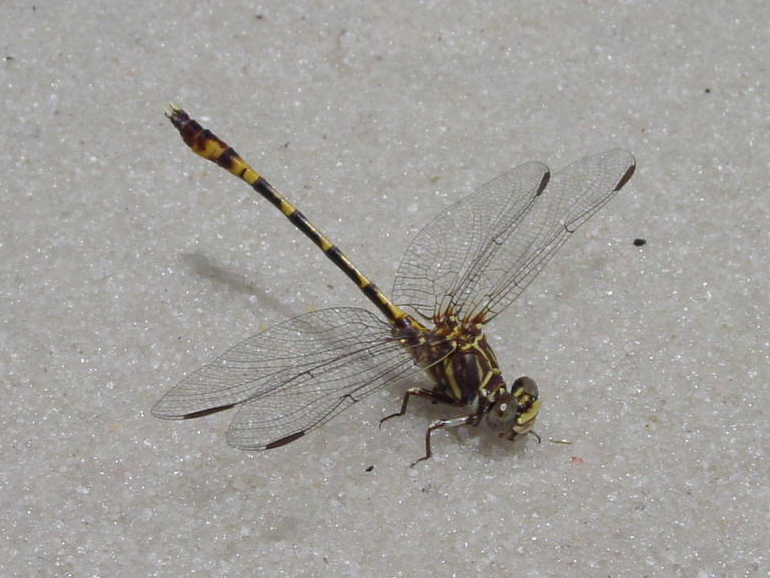

Conservation status
- Least Concern (IUCN 3.1)

Scientific classification
- Kingdom: Animalia
- Phylum: Arthropoda
- Class: Insecta
- Order: Odonata
- Infraorder: Anisoptera
- Family: Gomphidae
- Genus: Progomphus
- Species: P. alachuensis

Binomial name
- Progomphus alachuensis Byers, 1939

= Progomphus alachuensis =

Species of dragonfly

Progomphus alachuensis, the tawny sanddragon, is a species of clubtail in the dragonfly family Gomphidae. It is found in North America.

The IUCN conservation status of Progomphus alachuensis is "LC", least concern, with no immediate threat to the species' survival. The population is stable. The IUCN status was reviewed in 2017.
