= Alocoderus imitator =

Scientific classification
- Kingdom: Animalia
- Phylum: Arthropoda
- Clade: Pancrustacea
- Class: Insecta
- Order: Coleoptera
- Suborder: Polyphaga
- Infraorder: Scarabaeiformia
- Family: Scarabaeidae
- Genus: Alocoderus
- Species: A. imitator

Binomial name
- Alocoderus imitator (Koshanschikov, 1916)

Synonyms
- Aphodius (Alocoderus) imitator Reitter, 1892

Species of beetle

Alocoderus imitator is a species of beetle of the family Scarabaeidae. It is found in Malaysia (Sarawak).

== Description ==
Adults reach a length of about 10.5 mm (0.41 in). They have a shiny, slightly convex, yellowish-brown body. The front of the head, the sides of the pronotum, the tips of the elytra, the legs, and the antennae are lighter.
