= Alocoderus teyrovskyi =

Scientific classification
- Kingdom: Animalia
- Phylum: Arthropoda
- Clade: Pancrustacea
- Class: Insecta
- Order: Coleoptera
- Suborder: Polyphaga
- Infraorder: Scarabaeiformia
- Family: Scarabaeidae
- Genus: Alocoderus
- Species: A. teyrovskyi

Binomial name
- Alocoderus teyrovskyi (Balthasar, 1935)

Synonyms
- Aphodius (Alocoderus) teyrovskyi Balthasar, 1935; Aphodius (Alocoderus) milvus pakistanus Balthasar, 1960; Aphodius (Alocoderus) milvus Balthasar, 1955; Aphodius (Aphodius) pedongensis Paulian, 1936

Species of beetle

Alocoderus teyrovskyi is a species of beetle of the family Scarabaeidae. It is found in India (Punjab, Rajasthan, West Bengal, Sikkim, Uttarakhand), Vietnam, Afghanistan, Nepal and Pakistan.

== Description ==
Adults reach a length of about 7–8.5 mm (0.28–0.33 in). They have an parallel-sided, strongly convex, shiny, mostly glabrous body. The head and pronotum are blackish-brown. The margins of the head are reddish and the pronotum has reddish-brown sides. The elytra are dark yellowish-brown, with the sutural interval and the striae darkened. The antennae are yellow and the underside is blackish-brown.
