= Euorodalus longevittatus =

Scientific classification
- Kingdom: Animalia
- Phylum: Arthropoda
- Clade: Pancrustacea
- Class: Insecta
- Order: Coleoptera
- Suborder: Polyphaga
- Infraorder: Scarabaeiformia
- Family: Scarabaeidae
- Genus: Euorodalus
- Species: E. longevittatus

Binomial name
- Euorodalus longevittatus (Schmidt, 1917)

Synonyms
- Aphodius longevittatus Schmidt, 1917; Aphodius (Orodalus) luridipennis Sahlberg, 1908

Species of beetle

Euorodalus longevittatus is a species of beetle of the family Scarabaeidae. It is found in Palestine, Lebanon and Syria.

== Description ==
Adults reach a length of about 3.5–5 mm (0.14–0.20 in). The forebody is glossy, while the elytra appear somewhat duller. The head and pronotum are black, with a faint greenish tinge and with the sides of the pronotum a bit lighter. The elytra are light brown, with the sutural margin blackened and with a dark spot.
