= Progomphus serenus =

Conservation status
- Data Deficient (IUCN 3.1)

Scientific classification
- Kingdom: Animalia
- Phylum: Arthropoda
- Clade: Pancrustacea
- Class: Insecta
- Order: Odonata
- Suborder: Anisoptera
- Family: Gomphidae
- Genus: Progomphus
- Species: P. serenus

Binomial name
- Progomphus serenus Hagen in Selys, 1878

Species of dragonfly

Progomphus serenus, the Hispaniolan sanddragon, is a species of dragonfly in the family Gomphidae. It is endemic to Hispaniola (both the Dominican Republic and Haiti). Its natural habitats are subtropical or tropical moist lowland forests and rivers. It is threatened by habitat loss.
