= Progomphus tennesseni =

Conservation status
- Endangered (IUCN 3.1)

Scientific classification
- Kingdom: Animalia
- Phylum: Arthropoda
- Clade: Pancrustacea
- Class: Insecta
- Order: Odonata
- Suborder: Anisoptera
- Family: Gomphidae
- Genus: Progomphus
- Species: P. tennesseni

Binomial name
- Progomphus tennesseni Daigle, 1996

Species of dragonfly

Progomphus tennesseni, the bristle-tipped sanddragon, is a species of dragonfly in the family Gomphidae. It is endemic to the Dominican Republic. Specimens of this species were first collected by Dr. Oliver Flint of the Smithsonian Institution near a waterfall of a tributary of the Rio Yaqui del Norte, west of Jarabaco. Daigle (1996) recognized this species from a large number of Progomphus collected, who distinguished its differences from a larger number of Progomphus serenus specimens. Its natural habitats are subtropical or tropical moist lowland forests and rivers. It is threatened by habitat loss. The species is named after Ken Tennessen, a well-known researcher of New World Odonata.

== Sources ==
- Daigle, J. J. 1996. Progomphus tennesseni spec. nov. from the Dominican Republic, West Indies (Anisoptera: Gomphidae). Odonatologica 25(4): 367-370.
