= Progomphus risi =

Conservation status
- Endangered (IUCN 3.1)

Scientific classification
- Kingdom: Animalia
- Phylum: Arthropoda
- Clade: Pancrustacea
- Class: Insecta
- Order: Odonata
- Suborder: Anisoptera
- Family: Gomphidae
- Genus: Progomphus
- Species: P. risi

Binomial name
- Progomphus risi Williamson, 1920

Species of dragonfly

Progomphus risi, the Ris's sanddragon, is a species of dragonfly in the family Gomphidae. It is found in Guatemala and Mexico. Its natural habitats are subtropical or tropical moist lowland forests and rivers. It is threatened by habitat loss.
