= Anomius castaneus =

Scientific classification
- Kingdom: Animalia
- Phylum: Arthropoda
- Clade: Pancrustacea
- Class: Insecta
- Order: Coleoptera
- Suborder: Polyphaga
- Infraorder: Scarabaeiformia
- Family: Scarabaeidae
- Genus: Anomius
- Species: A. castaneus

Binomial name
- Anomius castaneus (Illiger, 1803)

Synonyms
- Aphodius castaneus Illiger, 1803; Anomius castanaeus bilobatus Clément, 1962; Aphodius (Amidorus) gineri Báguena, 1930; Aphodius (Amidorus) unicolor carbonarius Báguena, 1927; Aphodius (Amidorus) unicolor Reitter, 1892; Aphodius solieri Mulsant & Rey, 1870

Species of beetle

Anomius castaneus is a species of beetle of the family Scarabaeidae. It is found in Algeria, Malta, Morocco, Portugal, Spain, Italy (Sardinia, Sicily) and Tunisia.

== Description ==
Adults reach a length of about 5–6.5 mm (0.20–0.26 in). They have an oblong, moderately convex, shiny, glabrous, chestnut brown body.
