= Alocoderus volubilis =

Scientific classification
- Kingdom: Animalia
- Phylum: Arthropoda
- Clade: Pancrustacea
- Class: Insecta
- Order: Coleoptera
- Suborder: Polyphaga
- Infraorder: Scarabaeiformia
- Family: Scarabaeidae
- Genus: Alocoderus
- Species: A. volubilis

Binomial name
- Alocoderus volubilis (Balthasar, 1961)

Synonyms
- Aphodius (Alocoderus) volubilis Balthasar, 1961

Species of beetle

Alocoderus volubilis is a species of beetle of the family Scarabaeidae. It is found in Afghanistan.

== Description ==
Adults reach a length of about 6.4 mm (0.25 in). They have a parallel-sided, shining, glabrous, yellowish-brown body. Most of the head, a discal mark on the pronotum, the sutural margin of the elytra and the edges of the scutellum are brownish-black.
