= Eurysticta reevesi =

Queensland pin

Conservation status
- Data Deficient (IUCN 3.1)

Scientific classification
- Kingdom: Animalia
- Phylum: Arthropoda
- Clade: Pancrustacea
- Class: Insecta
- Order: Odonata
- Suborder: Zygoptera
- Family: Isostictidae
- Genus: Eurysticta
- Species: E. reevesi

Binomial name
- Eurysticta reevesi Theischinger, 2001

Species of damselfly

Eurysticta reevesi is a species of damselfly in the family Isostictidae, commonly known as a Queensland pin. It has only been recorded from Central Queensland, Australia, where it inhabits pools in rivers. It is a small to medium-sized damselfly, pale brown in colour with a dark band across its body.

== Etymology ==
The genus name Eurysticta is derived from the Greek εὐρύς (eurys, "wide" or "broad") and στικτός (stiktos, "spotted" or "marked"). The suffix -sticta is commonly used in names of taxa within the subfamily Isostictinae.

In 2001, Günther Theischinger named this species reevesi, an eponym honouring Deniss Reeves (1933–2017), foundation president of the Australian Dragonfly Society, who first drew attention to the existence of a species of Eurysticta in Queensland.

== See also ==
- List of Odonata species of Australia
