= Alocoderus strigimargo =

Scientific classification
- Kingdom: Animalia
- Phylum: Arthropoda
- Clade: Pancrustacea
- Class: Insecta
- Order: Coleoptera
- Suborder: Polyphaga
- Infraorder: Scarabaeiformia
- Family: Scarabaeidae
- Genus: Alocoderus
- Species: A. strigimargo

Binomial name
- Alocoderus strigimargo (Reitter, 1892)

Synonyms
- Aphodius (Melinopterus) strigimargo Reitter, 1892; Aphodius (Amidorus) fronticornis Koshantschikov, 1894

Species of beetle

Alocoderus strigimargo is a species of beetle of the family Scarabaeidae. It is found in Kazakhstan, Turkmenistan and Uzbekistan.

== Description ==
Adults reach a length of about 5–6.5 mm (0.20–0.26 in). They have an elongate, convex, moderately shiny, glabrous, brown-yellowish body. Part of the head, the disc and two lateral spots on the pronotum and the elytral suture are dark brownish. The legs and antennae are pale brownish.
