= Acrogomphus =

Scientific classification
- Domain: Eukaryota
- Kingdom: Animalia
- Phylum: Arthropoda
- Class: Insecta
- Order: Odonata
- Infraorder: Anisoptera
- Family: Gomphidae
- Genus: Acrogomphus; Laidlaw, 1925

Genus of dragonfly

Acrogomphus is a genus of dragonfly.

== Species ==
The following species are recognized in this genus:

- Acrogomphus fraseri Laidlaw, 1925
- Acrogomphus jubilaris Lieftinck, 1964
- Acrogomphus malayanus Laidlaw, 1925
- Acrogomphus walshae Lieftinck, 1935
- Acrogomphus walshi Lieftinck, 1935
