= Euorodalus =

Scientific classification
- Kingdom: Animalia
- Phylum: Arthropoda
- Clade: Pancrustacea
- Class: Insecta
- Order: Coleoptera
- Suborder: Polyphaga
- Infraorder: Scarabaeiformia
- Family: Scarabaeidae
- Subfamily: Aphodiinae
- Tribe: Aphodiini
- Genus: Euorodalus; Dellacasa, 1983

Synonyms
- Aphodius (Euorodalus) Dellacasa, 1983

Genus of beetles

Euorodalus is a genus of beetles of the family Scarabaeidae.

== Species ==
- Euorodalus boiteli (Thery, 1918)
- Euorodalus coenosus (Panzer, 1798)
- Euorodalus elephanthinus (Petrovitz, 1967)
- Euorodalus himalayanus (Koshantschikov, 1916)
- Euorodalus longevittatus (Schmidt, 1917)
- Euorodalus lucifer (Koshantschikov, 1894)
- Euorodalus paracoenosus (Balthasar & Hrubant, 1960)
- Euorodalus signifer (Mulsant & Rey, 1870)
- Euorodalus stribrnyi (Tesař, 1945)
- Euorodalus subtilitarsis (Petrovitz, 1963)
- Euorodalus tersus (Erichson, 1848)
