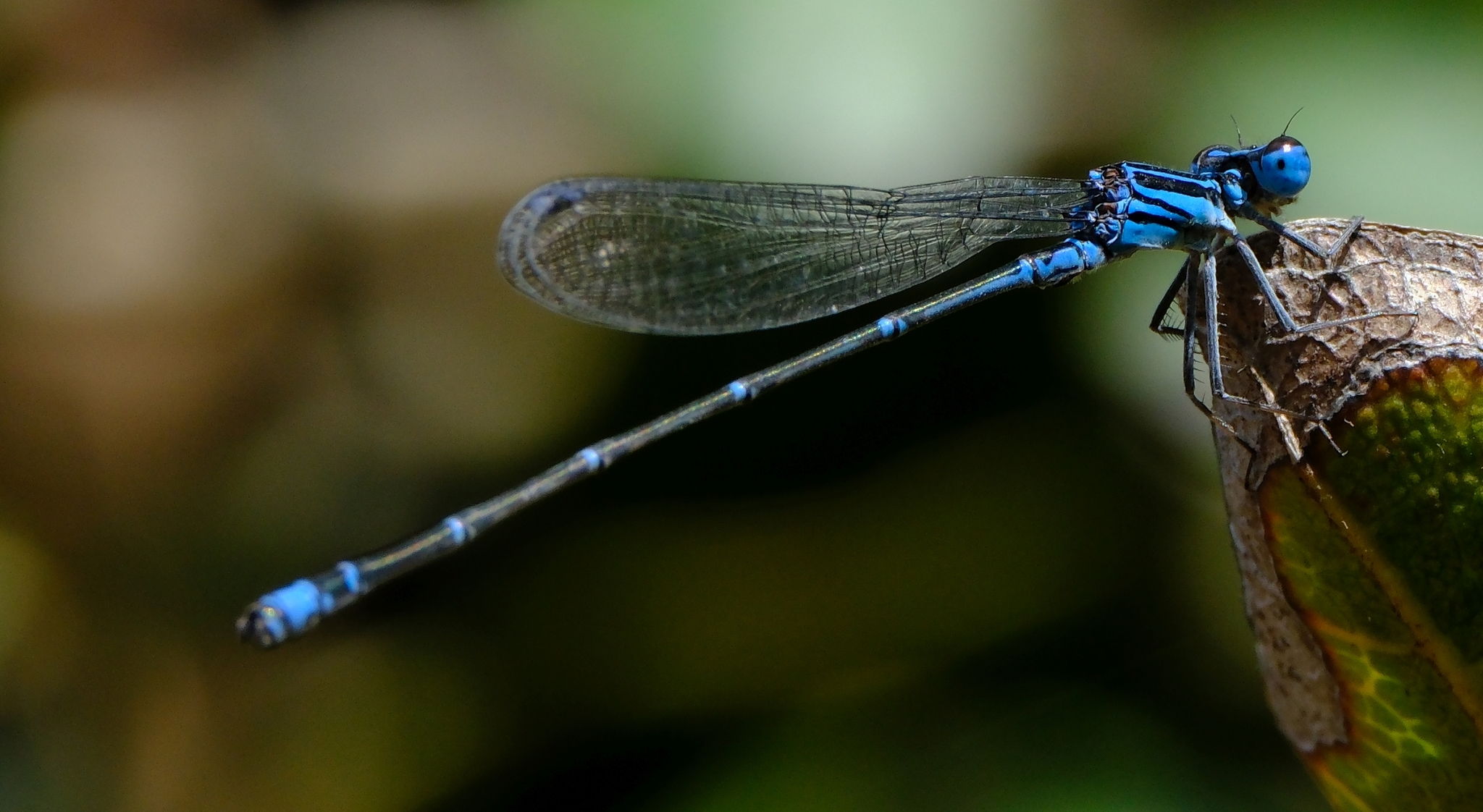

Conservation status
- Near Threatened (IUCN 3.1)

Scientific classification
- Kingdom: Animalia
- Phylum: Arthropoda
- Class: Insecta
- Order: Odonata
- Suborder: Zygoptera
- Family: Coenagrionidae
- Genus: Azuragrion
- Species: A. granti

Binomial name
- Azuragrion granti (McLachlan, 1903)

Synonyms
- Ischnura granti McLachlan, 1903

= Azuragrion granti =

Species of damselfly

Azuragrion granti, the Socotra bluet or Grant's bluet, is a species of narrow-winged damselfly in the family Coenagrionidae. It is endemic to Socotra in the Indian Ocean. It is a member of the narrow-winged damselfly family Coenagrionidae with its closest relatives originating in Africa, for example Azuragrion nigridorsum.

== Description ==
Azuragrion granti is, typically for narrow-winged dragonflies, a largely blue damselfly with black markings on top of the head, black stripes along the thorax and on the upper part of the abdomen which is paler underneath. It has narrow, transparent wings it holds vertically over their body when it is at rest.

== Distribution ==
Endemic to the island of Socotra, part of Yemen where it occurs mostly in the eastern granitic, mountainous half of the island over an area of 550 km^{2} in the Hagheir Mountains. Azuragrion granti apparently does not occur the karstic western half of Socotra as there are few open freshwater bodies to be found there.

== Habitat ==
The natural habitats of Azuragrion granti are rivers, intermittent freshwater lakes, freshwater marshes, and ponds. It is threatened by habitat loss although said to be locally abundant. This species breeds in mountain running water. Nothing is known about the biology of this species.

== Conservation status ==
There has been a decline in the quality of the habitat available to Azuragrion granti due to water extraction and pollution, and this has also been observed in the lowlands where the rapidly developing tourism industry concentrates. As a result, Azuragrion granti is therefore listed as near-threatened species. Due to its endemicity and the small range of the species, any future predicted impacts by infrastructure development on Socotra will almost certainly have negative effects.
