= Alocoderus holdereri =

Scientific classification
- Kingdom: Animalia
- Phylum: Arthropoda
- Clade: Pancrustacea
- Class: Insecta
- Order: Coleoptera
- Suborder: Polyphaga
- Infraorder: Scarabaeiformia
- Family: Scarabaeidae
- Genus: Alocoderus
- Species: A. holdereri

Binomial name
- Alocoderus holdereri (Reitter, 1900)

Synonyms
- Aphodius (Bodilus) holdereri Reitter, 1900

Species of beetle

Alocoderus holdereri is a species of beetle of the family Scarabaeidae. It is found in China (Qinghai, Xinjiang, Xizang), Nepal and Pakistan.

== Description ==
Adults reach a length of about 9–10 mm (0.35–0.39 in). They have an elongate, glabrous, glossy, yellowish-brown body. Parts of the head, a large discal spot on the pronotum, and the suture of the elytra are black.
