= Alocoderus elongatulus =

Scientific classification
- Kingdom: Animalia
- Phylum: Arthropoda
- Clade: Pancrustacea
- Class: Insecta
- Order: Coleoptera
- Suborder: Polyphaga
- Infraorder: Scarabaeiformia
- Family: Scarabaeidae
- Genus: Alocoderus
- Species: A. elongatulus

Binomial name
- Alocoderus elongatulus (Fabricius, 1801)

Synonyms
- Aphodius elongatulus Fabricius, 1801; Aphodius tuberifrons Fairmaire, 1889; Aphodius chinensis Harold, 1861; Aphodius testaceus Germar, 1813

Species of beetle

Alocoderus elongatulus is a species of beetle of the family Scarabaeidae. It is found in China (Yunnan), India (Sikkim, Uttarakhand, Haryana, West Bengal), Taiwan, Laos, Sri Lanka, Thailand and Vietnam.

== Description ==
Adults reach a length of about 6.5–7.5 mm (0.26–0.30 in). They have an oblong, strongly convex, glossy, reddish-brown body.
