= Alocoderus semenowi =

Scientific classification
- Kingdom: Animalia
- Phylum: Arthropoda
- Clade: Pancrustacea
- Class: Insecta
- Order: Coleoptera
- Suborder: Polyphaga
- Infraorder: Scarabaeiformia
- Family: Scarabaeidae
- Genus: Alocoderus
- Species: A. semenowi

Binomial name
- Alocoderus semenowi (Reitter, 1887)

Synonyms
- Aphodius semenowi Reitter, 1887; Aphodius (Alocoderus) semenowi huang Dellacasa, 1992

Species of beetle

Alocoderus semenowi is a species of beetle of the family Scarabaeidae. It is found in China (Qinghai, Xizang), Nepal and Turkmenistan.

== Description ==
Adults reach a length of about 8–10 mm (0.31–0.39 in). They have an elongate, shiny, strongly convex, glabrous, piceous body, sometimes with the elytra yellowish.
