= Acrogomphus fraseri =

Conservation status
- Data Deficient (IUCN 3.1)

Scientific classification
- Kingdom: Animalia
- Phylum: Arthropoda
- Class: Insecta
- Order: Odonata
- Infraorder: Anisoptera
- Family: Gomphidae
- Genus: Acrogomphus
- Species: A. fraseri

Binomial name
- Acrogomphus fraseri Laidlaw, 1925

Species of dragonfly

Acrogomphus fraseri is a species of dragonfly in the family Gomphidae. It is known only from the Western Ghats of India.

== Description and habitat ==
It is a medium-sized dragonfly with black thorax, marked with yellow. Its wings have a saffron tint, golden yellow at the bases. Abdomen is black, marked with yellow. Segment 1 has a triangular dorsal spot and a large spot on each side. Segment 2 has a mid-dorsal stripe and two spots on each side. Segments 3 to 6 have a pair of sub-dorsal basal spots. Segment 7 is with the basal half yellow with a black dorsal carina and a basal black ring. Segment 8 has a sub-basal spot on each side. Segment 9 has a similar but much smaller spot. Female is similar to the male.

It is commonly found at high altitude montane areas, perched on dead twigs on the tops of trees or soaring at great heights.

== See also ==
- List of odonates of India
- List of odonata of Kerala
