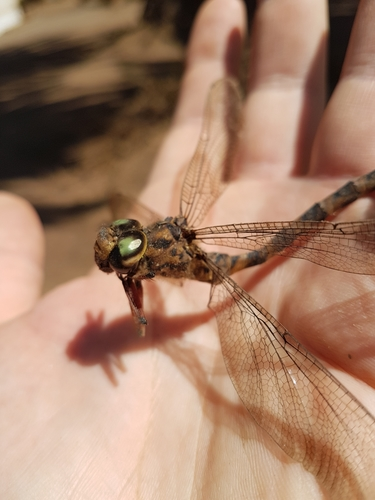
- Allopetalia reticulosa

Scientific classification
- Kingdom: Animalia
- Phylum: Arthropoda
- Clade: Pancrustacea
- Class: Insecta
- Order: Odonata
- Infraorder: Anisoptera
- Family: Aeshnidae
- Genus: Allopetalia; Selys

= Allopetalia =

Genus of Dragonflies

Allopetalia is a genus of dragonflies in the family Aeshnidae. There are two species in this genus.

== Species ==
There are only two species in this genus,

- Allopetalia reticulosa Selys, 1873
- Allopetalia pustulosa Selys, 1873

== Description ==
Both dragonflies in this genus are native to the Western coast of South America. They are both brown and prefer to live in freshwater habitats, like many other dragonflies. Allopetalia reticulosa is also listed as near-threatened by the IUCN.

== Etymology ==
Allopetalia can be split into two words with Greek roots, allo- and -petalia. Allo- comes from the Greek word allos which means other or different. Petalia comes from the Greek word πέταλον which means petal. Together, it could be taken as different petal, which could be referring to the way that these dragonflies can blend in very well into their environment and could be mistaken for just another part of the plant.
