= Alocoderus turbatus =

Scientific classification
- Kingdom: Animalia
- Phylum: Arthropoda
- Clade: Pancrustacea
- Class: Insecta
- Order: Coleoptera
- Suborder: Polyphaga
- Infraorder: Scarabaeiformia
- Family: Scarabaeidae
- Genus: Alocoderus
- Species: A. turbatus

Binomial name
- Alocoderus turbatus (Baudi, 1870)

Synonyms
- Aphodius turbatus Baudi, 1870; Aphodius (Alocoderus) antilibanonicus Balthasar, 1961; Aphodius (Melinopterus) lineimargo Reitter, 1892

Species of beetle

Alocoderus turbatus is a species of beetle of the family Scarabaeidae. It is found in Azerbaijan, Cyprus, Egypt, Iran, Iraq, Israel, Jordan, Libya, Syria and Turkey.

== Description ==
Adults reach a length of about 5–7 mm (0.20–0.28 in). They have an elongate, convex, glabrous body. The head and pronotum are moderately shiny, while the elytra are dull. They are reddish-brown, with the front, disc and two small lateral spots on the pronotum and elytral suture dark brown.
