= Alocoderus digitalis =

Scientific classification
- Kingdom: Animalia
- Phylum: Arthropoda
- Clade: Pancrustacea
- Class: Insecta
- Order: Coleoptera
- Suborder: Polyphaga
- Infraorder: Scarabaeiformia
- Family: Scarabaeidae
- Genus: Alocoderus
- Species: A. digitalis

Binomial name
- Alocoderus digitalis (Koshantschikov, 1894)

Synonyms
- Aphodius digitalis Koshantschikov, 1894; Aphodius (Bodilus) digitatus Reitter, 1892

Species of beetle

Alocoderus digitalis is a species of beetle of the family Scarabaeidae. It is found in Kazakhstan, Russia, Turkmenistan and Uzbekistan.

== Description ==
Adults reach a length of about 6.3–9 mm (0.25–0.35 in). They have an elongate-oval, glossy, light reddish-yellow-brown body, with the sutural margin of the elytra darkened. The edges of the head and pronotum, as well as the humeral region of the elytra, have long light-colored cilia and the tips of the elytra are covered with fine hairs.
