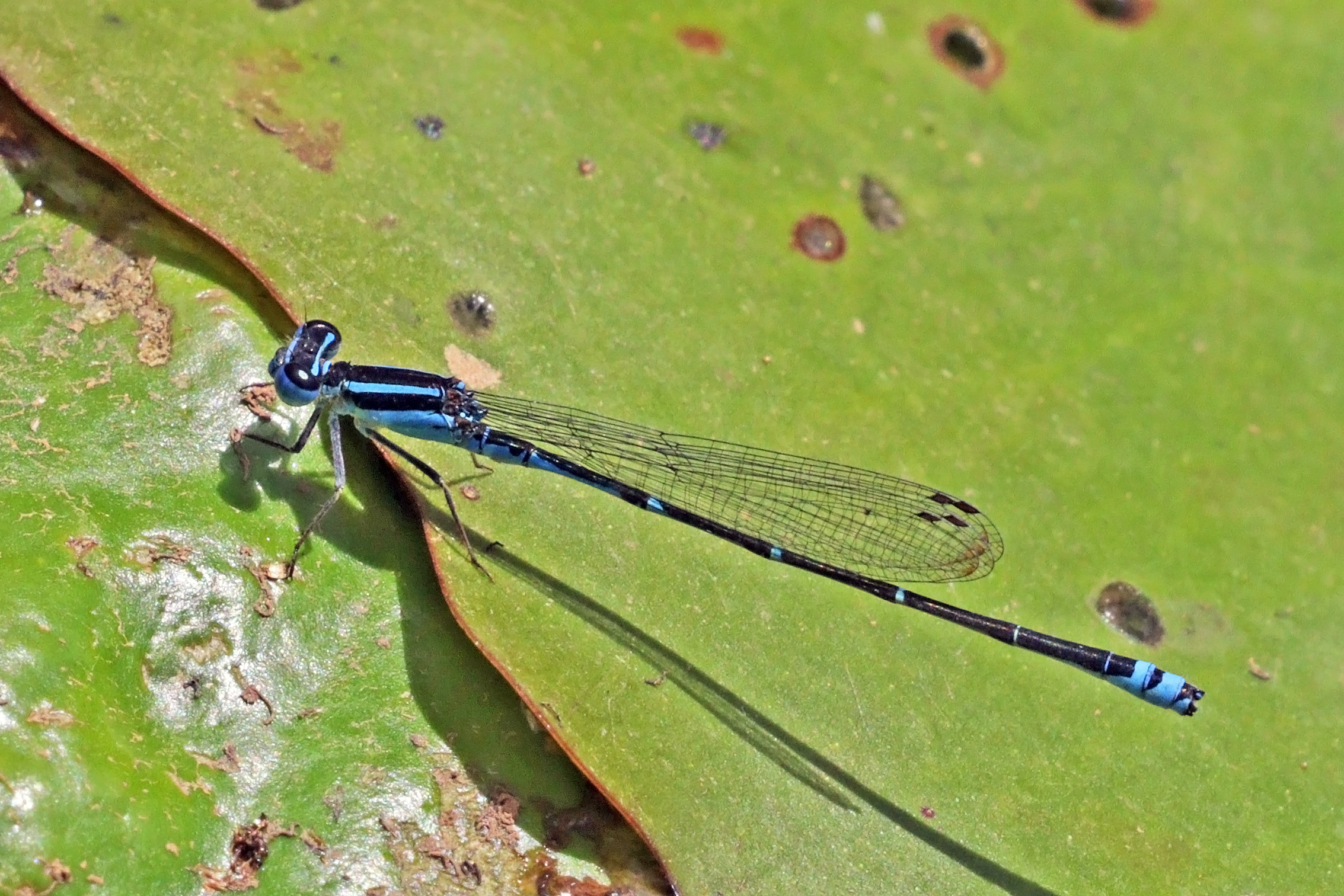
- male
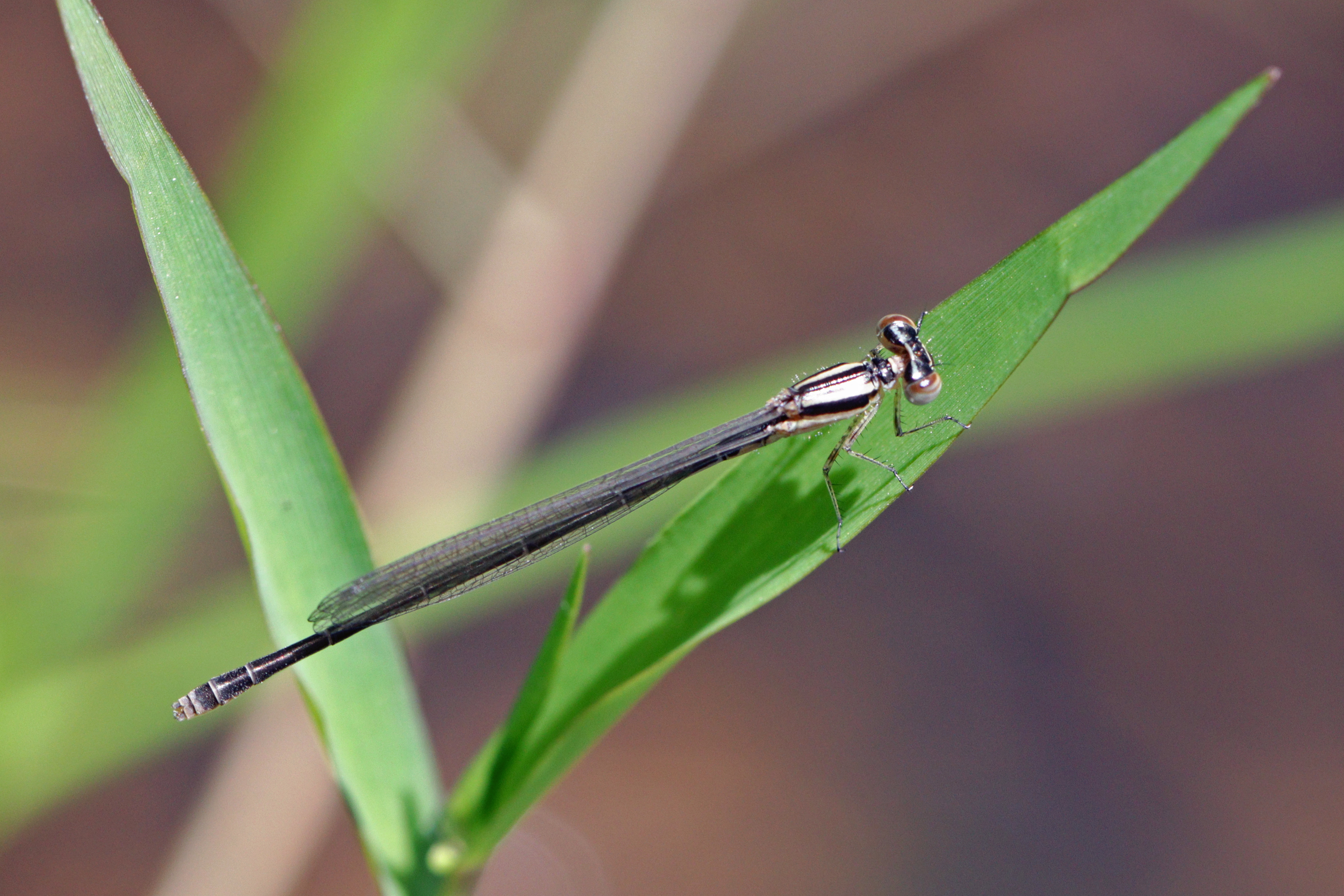
- fresh female both A. kauderni in Madagascar

Scientific classification
- Kingdom: Animalia
- Phylum: Arthropoda
- Class: Insecta
- Order: Odonata
- Suborder: Zygoptera
- Family: Coenagrionidae
- Genus: Azuragrion; May, 2002

= Azuragrion =

Genus of damselflies

Azuragrion is a genus of damselfly in family Coenagrionidae. The genus contains the following species:

- Azuragrion buchholzi (Pinhey, 1971)
- Azuragrion granti (McLachlan, 1903) - Socotra Bluet
- Azuragrion kauderni (Sjöstedt, 1917)
- Azuragrion nigridorsum (Selys, 1876) - Black-tailed Bluet, Sailing Bluet
- Azuragrion somalicum (Longfield, 1931)
- Azuragrion vansomereni (Pinhey, 1955) - Tiny Bluet
