= Anomius =

Scientific classification
- Kingdom: Animalia
- Phylum: Arthropoda
- Clade: Pancrustacea
- Class: Insecta
- Order: Coleoptera
- Suborder: Polyphaga
- Infraorder: Scarabaeiformia
- Family: Scarabaeidae
- Subfamily: Aphodiinae
- Tribe: Aphodiini
- Genus: Anomius; Mulsant & Rey, 1870

Synonyms
- Aphodius (Anomius) Mulsant & Rey, 1870

Genus of beetles

Anomius is a genus of beetles of the family Scarabaeidae.

== Species ==
- Anomius annamariae (Baraud, 1982)
- Anomius antii (Gridelli, 1930)
- Anomius apollonius (Petrovitz, 1971)
- Anomius baeticus (Mulsant & Rey, 1870)
- Anomius castaneus (Illiger, 1803)
- Anomius crovettii (Dellacasa, 1983)
- Anomius hamricola (Clément, 1928)
- Anomius neidae (Petrovitz, 1971)
- Anomius petrovitzi (Clément, 1976)
- Anomius peyerimhoffi (Théry, 1925)
- Anomius saturnalis Ziani, 2011
- Anomius segonzaci (Bedel, 1904)
- Anomius theryi Clément, 1962
