= Euorodalus lucifer =

Scientific classification
- Kingdom: Animalia
- Phylum: Arthropoda
- Clade: Pancrustacea
- Class: Insecta
- Order: Coleoptera
- Suborder: Polyphaga
- Infraorder: Scarabaeiformia
- Family: Scarabaeidae
- Genus: Euorodalus
- Species: E. lucifer

Binomial name
- Euorodalus lucifer (Koshantschikov, 1894)

Synonyms
- Aphodius (Orodalus) lucifer Koshantschikov, 1894

Species of beetle

Euorodalus lucifer is a species of beetle of the family Scarabaeidae. It is found in Kazakhstan and Uzbekistan.

== Description ==
Adults reach a length of about 3.5 mm (0.14 in). They have a moderately convex, shiny, black body, with dark reddish-brown elytra.
