= Eurysticta kununurra =

Kimberley pin

Conservation status
- Data Deficient (IUCN 3.1)

Scientific classification
- Kingdom: Animalia
- Phylum: Arthropoda
- Clade: Pancrustacea
- Class: Insecta
- Order: Odonata
- Suborder: Zygoptera
- Family: Isostictidae
- Genus: Eurysticta
- Species: E. kununurra

Binomial name
- Eurysticta kununurra Watson, 1991

Species of damselfly

Eurysticta kununurra is a species of damselfly in the family Isostictidae, commonly known as a Kimberley pin. It has been recorded in the Kimberley region in Western Australia, where it inhabits rivers.

Eurysticta kununurra is a small to medium-sized damselfly, pale brown in colour with a pair of bronze-green bands on its back behind its head.

== Etymology ==
The genus name Eurysticta is derived from the Greek εὐρύς (eurys, "wide" or "broad") and στικτός (stiktos, "spotted" or "marked"). The suffix -sticta is commonly used in names of taxa within the subfamily Isostictinae.

The species name kununurra is named for Kununurra, in the Kimberley region of Western Australia, the type locality.

== Gallery ==
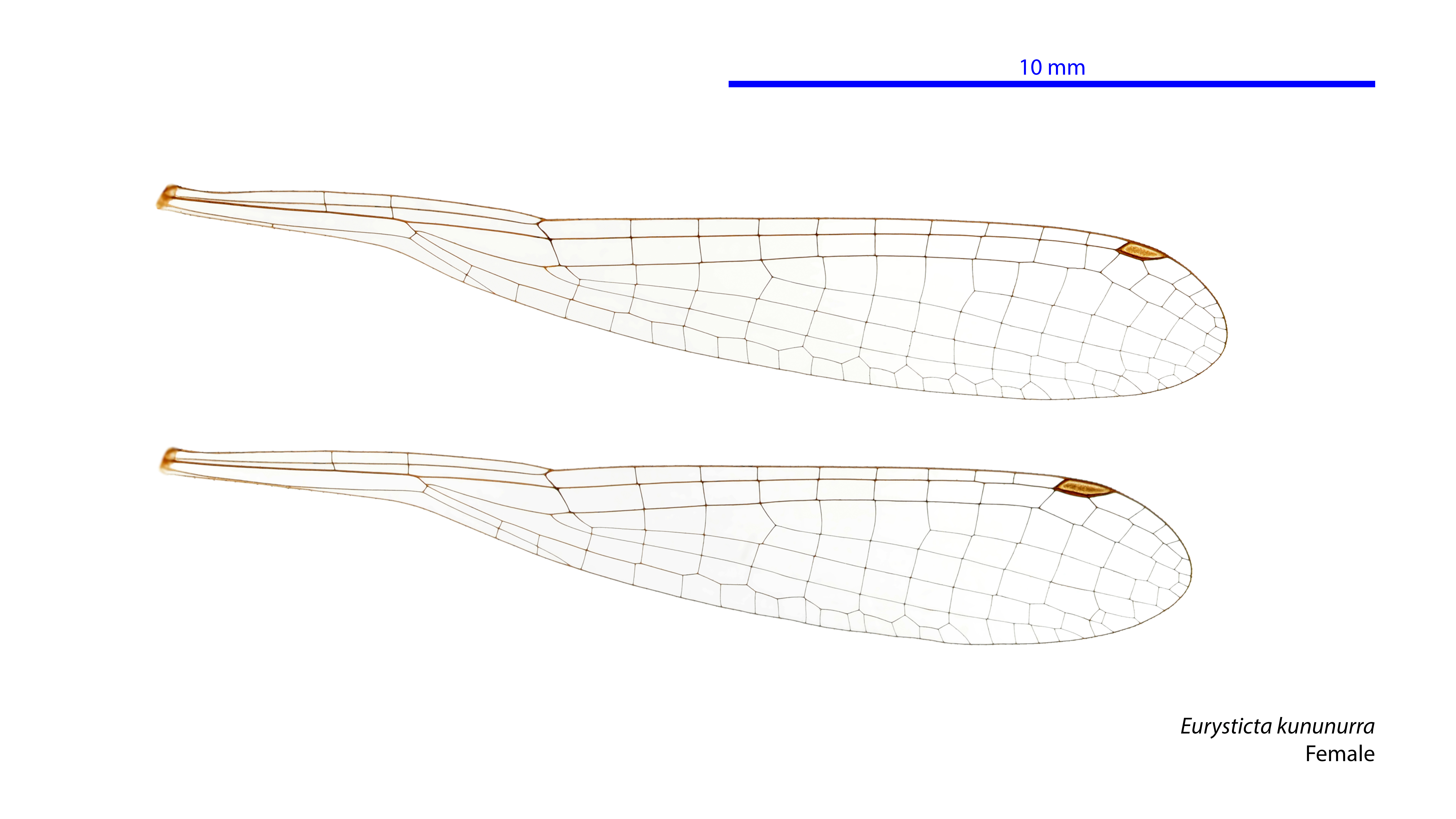
Female wings

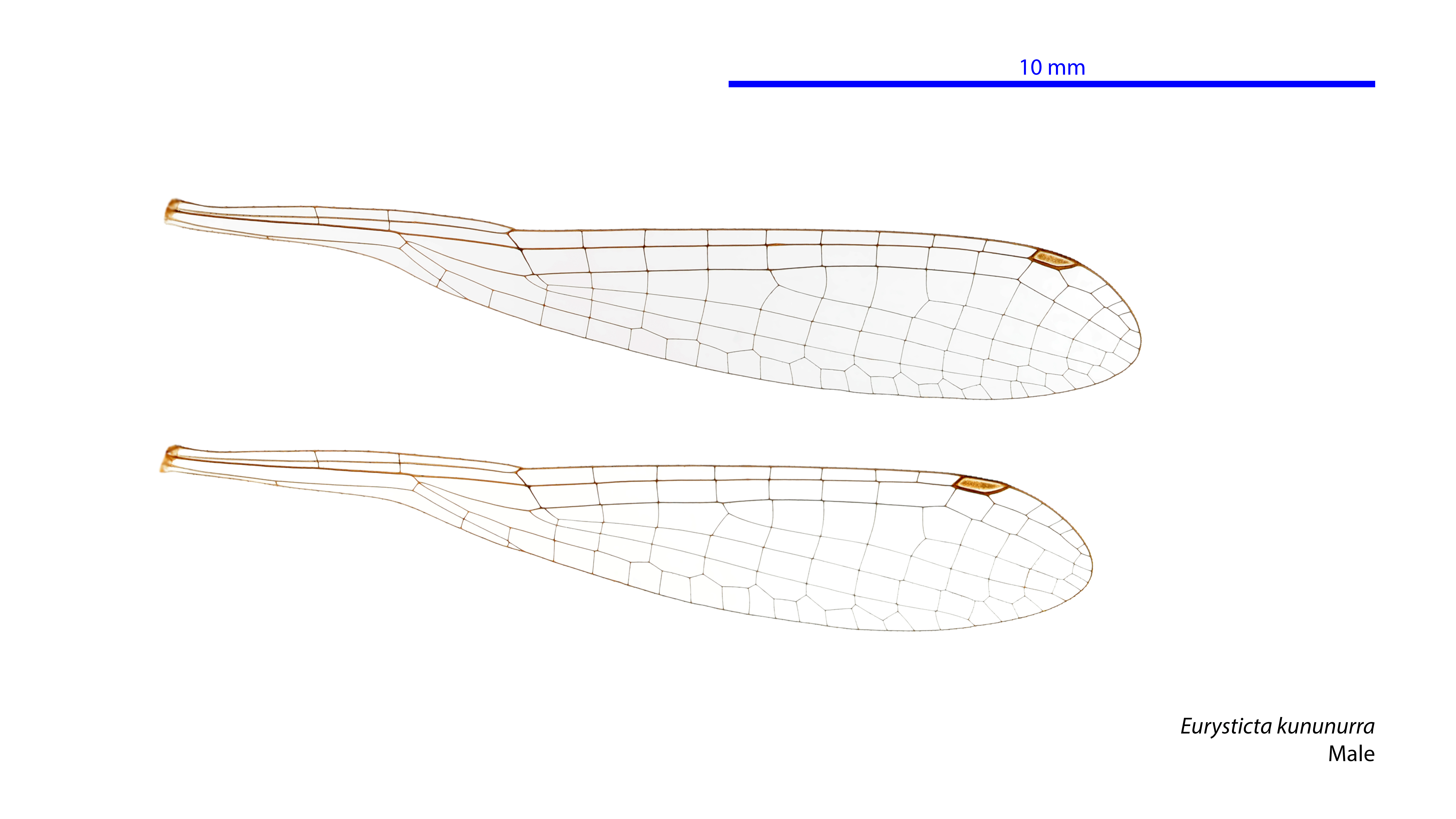
Male wings

== See also ==
- List of Odonata species of Australia
