= Eurysticta =

Scientific classification
- Kingdom: Animalia
- Phylum: Arthropoda
- Clade: Pancrustacea
- Class: Insecta
- Order: Odonata
- Suborder: Zygoptera
- Family: Isostictidae
- Genus: Eurysticta; Watson, 1969

Genus of damselflies

Eurysticta is a genus of damselflies belonging to the family Isostictidae. It is endemic to northern Australia. Species of Eurysticta are small to medium-sized damselflies, with a pale brown or bronze colouring.

== Species ==
The genus Eurysticta includes the following species:

- Eurysticta coolawanyah Watson, 1969
- Eurysticta coomalie Watson, 1991
- Eurysticta kununurra Watson, 1991
- Eurysticta reevesi Theischinger, 2001

== Etymology ==
The genus name Eurysticta is derived from the Greek εὐρύς (eurys, "wide" or "broad") and στικτός (stiktos, "spotted" or "marked"). The suffix -sticta is commonly used in names of taxa within the subfamily Isostictinae.
