= Euorodalus tersus =

Scientific classification
- Kingdom: Animalia
- Phylum: Arthropoda
- Clade: Pancrustacea
- Class: Insecta
- Order: Coleoptera
- Suborder: Polyphaga
- Infraorder: Scarabaeiformia
- Family: Scarabaeidae
- Genus: Euorodalus
- Species: E. tersus

Binomial name
- Euorodalus tersus (Erichson, 1848)

Synonyms
- Aphodius tersus Erichson, 1848; Aphodius suturalis Lucas, 1846

Species of beetle

Euorodalus tersus is a species of beetle of the family Scarabaeidae. It is found in Albania, Algeria, Egypt, Italy, Libya, Malta, Montenegro, Morocco, Portugal, Spain and Tunisia.

== Description ==
Adults reach a length of about 3.5–4 mm (0.14–0.16 in). They have a quite strongly convex, shiny, glabrous body. The head, pronotum and scutellum are black, with the sides of the pronotum reddish-yellow. The elytra are light brownish-yellow, with the sutural interval black. The legs are brown.
