= Progomphus zephyrus =

Conservation status
- Endangered (IUCN 3.1)

Scientific classification
- Kingdom: Animalia
- Phylum: Arthropoda
- Clade: Pancrustacea
- Class: Insecta
- Order: Odonata
- Suborder: Anisoptera
- Family: Gomphidae
- Genus: Progomphus
- Species: P. zephyrus

Binomial name
- Progomphus zephyrus Needham, 1941

Species of dragonfly

Progomphus zephyrus, the elusive sanddragon, is a species of dragonfly in the family Gomphidae. It is endemic to the Dominican Republic. Its natural habitats are subtropical or tropical moist lowland forests and rivers. It is threatened by habitat loss.
