= Euorodalus himalayanus =

Scientific classification
- Kingdom: Animalia
- Phylum: Arthropoda
- Clade: Pancrustacea
- Class: Insecta
- Order: Coleoptera
- Suborder: Polyphaga
- Infraorder: Scarabaeiformia
- Family: Scarabaeidae
- Genus: Euorodalus
- Species: E. himalayanus

Binomial name
- Euorodalus himalayanus (Koshantschikov, 1916)

Synonyms
- Aphodius (Orodalus) himalayanus Koshantschikov, 1916

Species of beetle

Euorodalus himalayanus is a species of beetle of the family Scarabaeidae. It is found in India (Himachal Pradesh, Jammu & Kashmir) and Pakistan.

== Description ==
Adults reach a length of about 3.2–3.5 mm (0.13–0.14 in). They have a slightly convex, black, rather dull, and fairly broad body.
