= Alocoderus hydrochaeris =

Scientific classification
- Kingdom: Animalia
- Phylum: Arthropoda
- Clade: Pancrustacea
- Class: Insecta
- Order: Coleoptera
- Suborder: Polyphaga
- Infraorder: Scarabaeiformia
- Family: Scarabaeidae
- Genus: Alocoderus
- Species: A. hydrochaeris

Binomial name
- Alocoderus hydrochaeris (Fabricius, 1798)

Synonyms
- Scarabaeus hydrochaeris Fabricius, 1798; Aphodius cognatus Stevens, 1866; Aphodius hydrochoeris tataricus Harold, 1866; Aphodius hydrochaeris coloratus Mulsant, 1842; Aphodius hydrochaeris discicollis Mulsant, 1842; Aphodius hydrochaeris germanus Mulsant, 1842; Aphodius meridionalis Villa, 1835

Species of beetle

Alocoderus hydrochaeris is a species of beetle of the family Scarabaeidae. It is found in Algeria, Armenia, Austria, Belgium, Bulgaria, the Canary Islands, Croatia, Cyprus, Egypt, France, Georgia, Germany, Greece, Hungary, Iran, Iraq, Israel, Italy, Kazakhstan, Lebanon, Libya, Madeira, Malta, Morocco, the Netherlands, Poland, Portugal, Romania, Russia (including Siberia), Slovakia, Slovenia, Spain, Syria, Tunisia and Ukraine.

== Description ==
Adults reach a length of about 7–9 mm (0.28–0.35 in). They have a strongly convex, oblong, glabrous body. The head and pronotum are shiny, while the elytra are less shiny. The dorsal and ventral surfaces are yellowish-brown, with the back of the head darker. The pronotum has a dark spot and normally also a small dark mark within the yellow lateral margin. The elytral suture is darkened.
