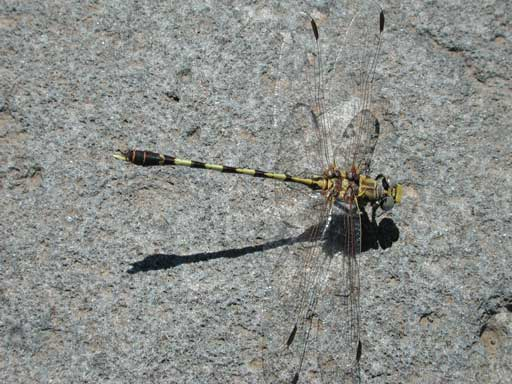
- Progomphus borealis

Scientific classification
- Kingdom: Animalia
- Phylum: Arthropoda
- Clade: Pancrustacea
- Class: Insecta
- Order: Odonata
- Infraorder: Anisoptera
- Family: Gomphidae
- Genus: Progomphus; Selys, 1854

= Progomphus =

Genus of dragonflies

Progomphus is a genus of medium-sized dragonflies in the family Gomphidae. They are found in the Americas and are largely tropical. They are one of the few Gomphids with coloured wings.

They are commonly called sanddragons. They are usually found on freshwater sandy beaches and pools.

The genus contains the following species:

- Progomphus abbreviatus Belle, 1973
- Progomphus aberrans Belle, 1973
- Progomphus adaptatus Belle, 1973
- Progomphus alachuensis Byers, 1939 – tawny sanddragon
- Progomphus amarillus Tennessen, 1992
- Progomphus amazonicus Belle, 1973
- Progomphus angeloi Belle, 1994
- Progomphus anomalus Belle, 1973
- Progomphus approximatus Belle, 1966
- Progomphus auropictus Ris, 1911
- Progomphus australis Belle, 1973
- Progomphus basalis Belle, 1994
- Progomphus basistictus Ris, 1911
- Progomphus bellei Knopf & Tennessen, 1980 – Belle's sanddragon
- Progomphus belyshevi Belle, 1991
- Progomphus bidentatus Belle, 1994
- Progomphus boliviensis Belle, 1973 – Bolivian sanddragon
- Progomphus borealis McLachlan in Selys, 1873 – gray sanddragon
- Progomphus brachycnemis Needham, 1944
- Progomphus clendoni Calvert, 1905
- Progomphus complicatus Selys, 1854
- Progomphus conjectus Belle, 1966
- Progomphus costalis Hagen in Selys, 1854
- Progomphus delicatus Belle, 1973
- Progomphus dorsopallidus Byers, 1934
- Progomphus elegans Belle, 1973
- Progomphus fassli Belle, 1973
- Progomphus flinti Belle, 1975
- Progomphus formalis Belle, 1973
- Progomphus geijskesi Needham, 1944
- Progomphus gracilis Hagen in Selys, 1854
- Progomphus guyanensis Belle, 1966
- Progomphus herrerae Needham & Etcheverry, 1956
- Progomphus incurvatus Belle, 1973
- Progomphus integer Hagen in Selys, 1878
- Progomphus intricatus Hagen in Selys, 1858
- Progomphus joergenseni Ris, 1908
- Progomphus kimminsi Belle, 1973
- Progomphus lambertoi Novelo-Gutiérrez, 2007
- Progomphus lepidus Ris, 1911
- Progomphus longistigma Ris, 1918
- Progomphus maculatus Belle, 1984
- Progomphus marcelae Novelo-Gutiérrez, 2007
- Progomphus mexicanus Belle, 1973
- Progomphus microcephalus Belle, 1994
- Progomphus montanus Belle, 1973
- Progomphus nervis Belle, 1973
- Progomphus nigellus Belle, 1990
- Progomphus obscurus (Rambur, 1842) – common sanddragon
- Progomphus occidentalis Belle, 1983
- Progomphus perithemoides Belle, 1980
- Progomphus perpusillus Ris, 1918
- Progomphus phyllochromus Ris, 1918
- Progomphus pijpersi Belle, 1966
- Progomphus polygonus Selys, 1879
- Progomphus pygmaeus Selys, 1873
- Progomphus racenisi De Marmels, 1983
- Progomphus recticarinatus Calvert, 1909
- Progomphus recurvatus Ris, 1911
- Progomphus risi Williamson, 1920 – Ris's sanddragon
- Progomphus serenus Hagen in Selys, 1878 – Hispaniolan sanddragon
- Progomphus superbus Belle, 1973
- Progomphus tantillus Belle, 1973
- Progomphus tennesseni Daigle, 1996 – bristle-tipped sanddragon
- Progomphus tibialis Belle, 1973
- Progomphus victor St. Quentin, 1973
- Progomphus virginiae Belle, 1973
- Progomphus zephyrus Needham, 1941 – elusive sanddragon
- Progomphus zonatus Hagen in Selys, 1854
