= Euorodalus stribrnyi =

Scientific classification
- Kingdom: Animalia
- Phylum: Arthropoda
- Clade: Pancrustacea
- Class: Insecta
- Order: Coleoptera
- Suborder: Polyphaga
- Infraorder: Scarabaeiformia
- Family: Scarabaeidae
- Genus: Euorodalus
- Species: E. stribrnyi

Binomial name
- Euorodalus stribrnyi (Tesař, 1945)

Synonyms
- Aphodius (Orodalus) stribrnyi Tesař, 1945

Species of beetle

Euorodalus stribrnyi is a species of beetle of the family Scarabaeidae. It is found in China (Heilongjiang).

== Description ==
Adults reach a length of about 4 mm (0.16 in). They have a shiny, glabrous body. The head and pronotum are blackish-brown, the latter with yellowish-brown sides. The elytra are dark yellowish-brown, with the sutural interval and the apical margin darkened. The underside is brown and the legs are yellowish-brown.
