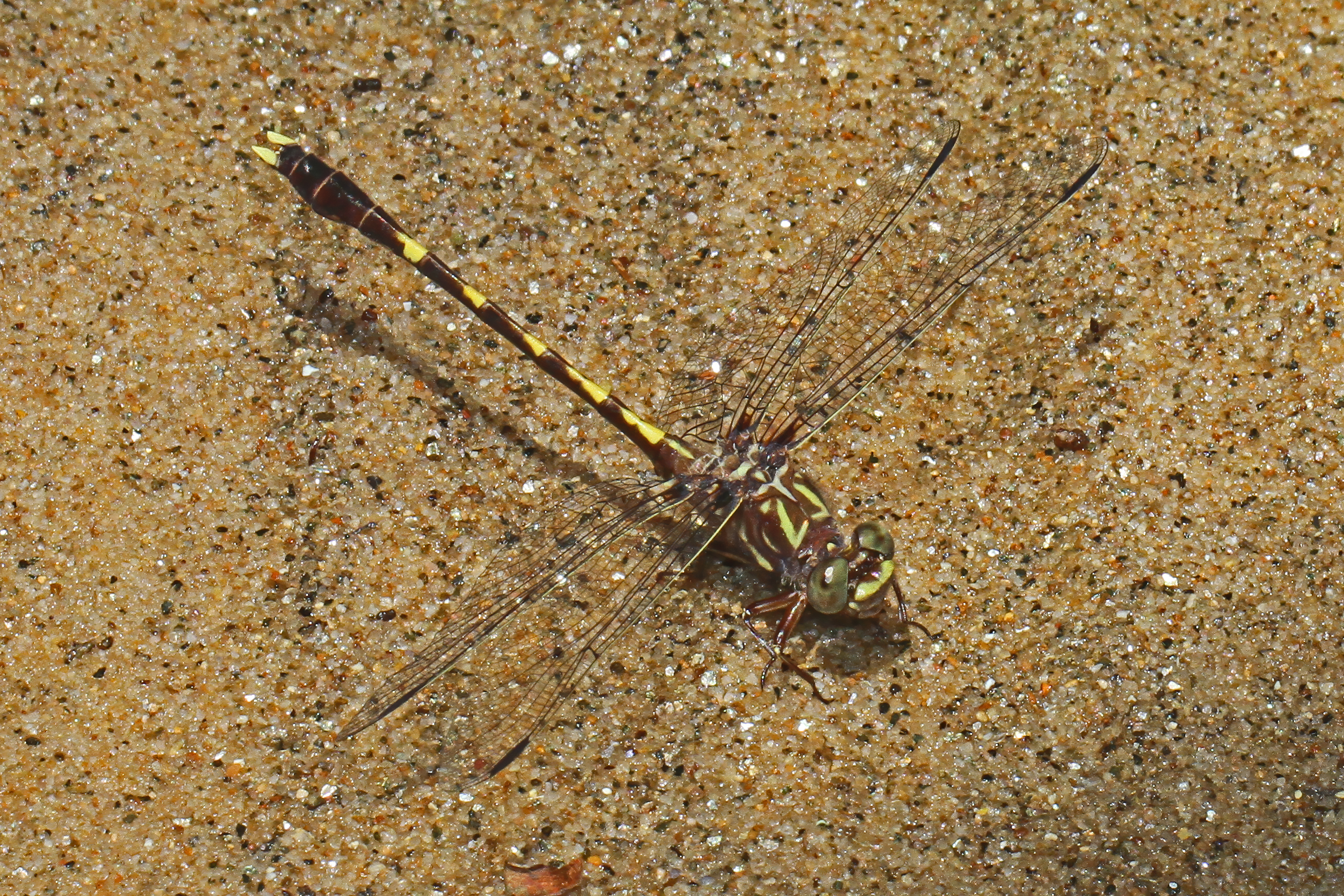

Conservation status
- Least Concern (IUCN 3.1)

Scientific classification
- Kingdom: Animalia
- Phylum: Arthropoda
- Class: Insecta
- Order: Odonata
- Infraorder: Anisoptera
- Family: Gomphidae
- Genus: Progomphus
- Species: P. obscurus

Binomial name
- Progomphus obscurus (Rambur, 1842)

= Progomphus obscurus =

Species of dragonfly

Progomphus obscurus, the common sanddragon, is a species of dragonfly in the family Gomphidae, found in eastern United States and southern Ontario.
