= Acrogomphus malayanus =

Malayan hooktail

Conservation status
- Near Threatened (IUCN 3.1)

Scientific classification
- Kingdom: Animalia
- Phylum: Arthropoda
- Class: Insecta
- Order: Odonata
- Infraorder: Anisoptera
- Family: Gomphidae
- Genus: Acrogomphus
- Species: A. malayanus

Binomial name
- Acrogomphus malayanus Laidlaw (1925)

Species of dragonfly

Acrogomphus malayanus, also known as the Malayan hooktail, is a species of dragonfly which is endemic to Peninsular Malaysia. It is described as a rare and endangered species which can be found in multiple areas of Malaysia including Sungai Tiang, Sungai Kuda, Sungai rokan, Sungai Semelian and Sungai Tan Hain.
