= Eurysticta coolawanyah =

Conservation status
- Vulnerable (IUCN 3.1)

Scientific classification
- Kingdom: Animalia
- Phylum: Arthropoda
- Clade: Pancrustacea
- Class: Insecta
- Order: Odonata
- Suborder: Zygoptera
- Family: Isostictidae
- Genus: Eurysticta
- Species: E. coolawanyah

Binomial name
- Eurysticta coolawanyah Watson, 1969

Species of damselfly

Eurysticta coolawanyah is a species of damselfly in the family Isostictidae, commonly known as a Pilbara pin. It is endemic to the Pilbara region in Western Australia, where it inhabits pools in rivers.

Eurysticta coolawanyah is a pale brown, small to medium-sized damselfly.

== Etymology ==
The genus name Eurysticta is derived from the Greek εὐρύς (eurys, "wide" or "broad") and στικτός (stiktos, "spotted" or "marked"). The suffix -sticta is commonly used in names of taxa within the subfamily Isostictinae.

The species name coolawanyah is named for Coolawanyah Station, in the Pilbara region of Western Australia, near the type locality.

== Gallery ==
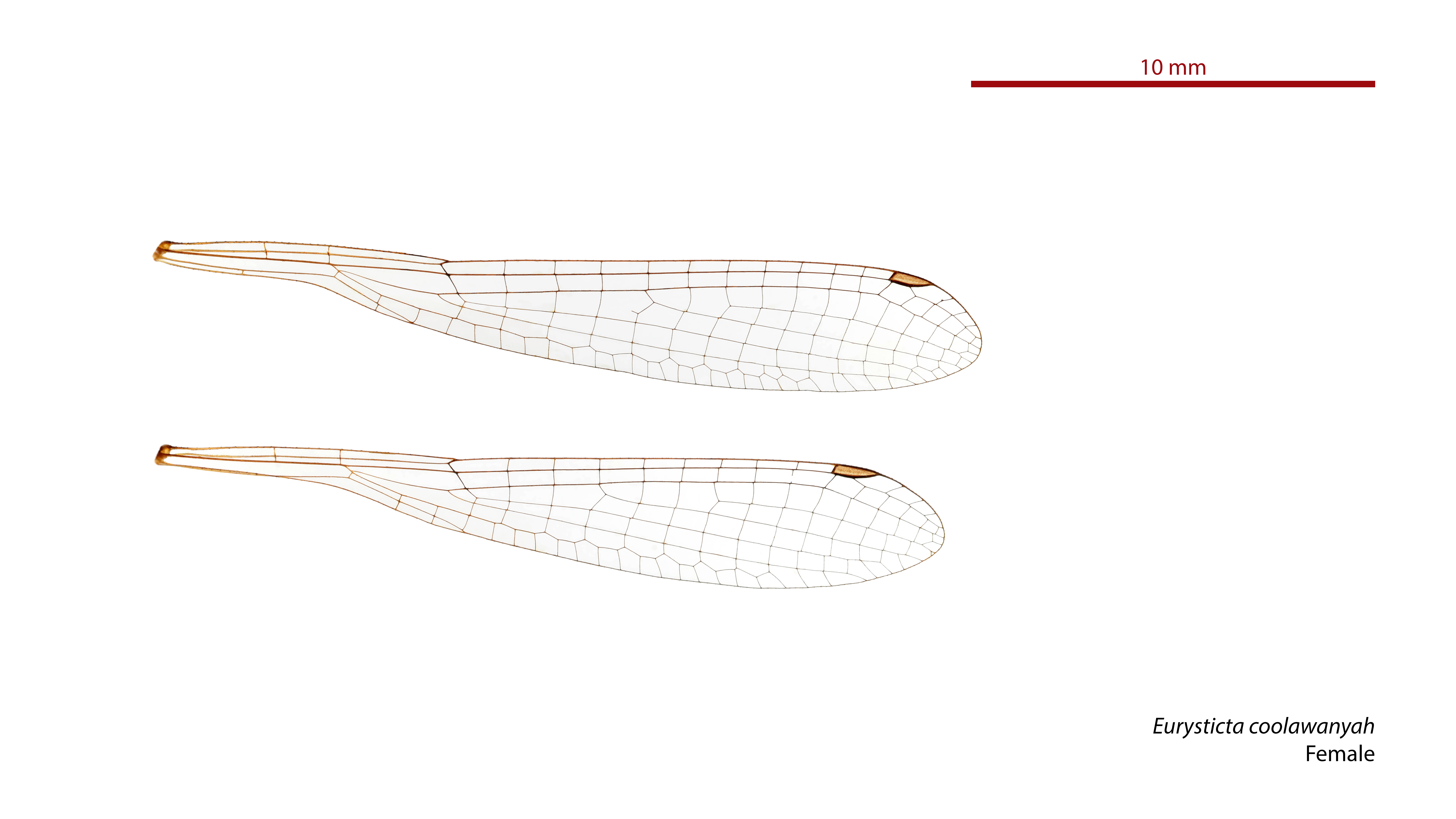
Female wings

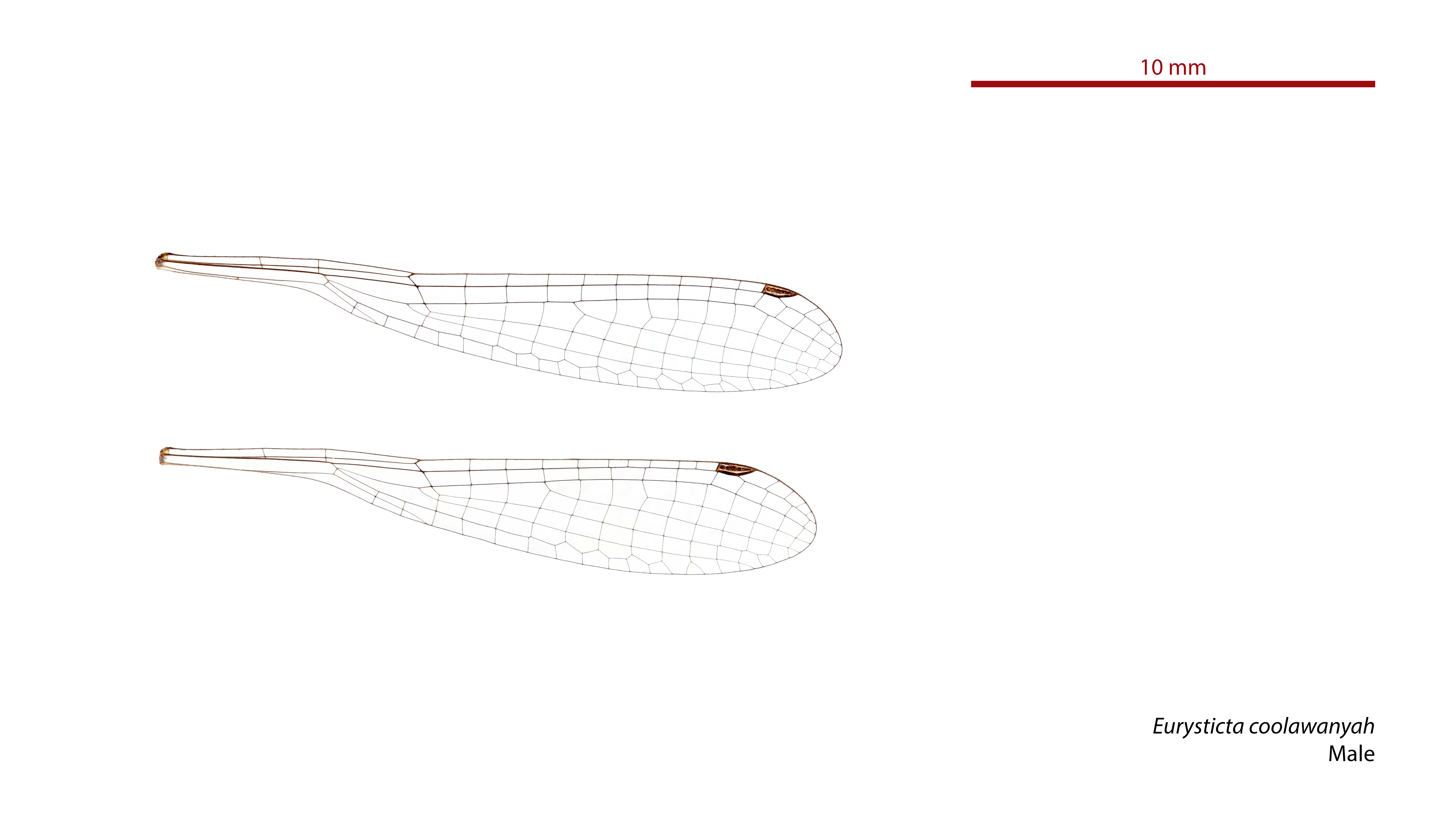
Male wings

== See also ==
- List of Odonata species of Australia
