= Progomphus bellei =

Conservation status
- Least Concern (IUCN 3.1)

Scientific classification
- Kingdom: Animalia
- Phylum: Arthropoda
- Class: Insecta
- Order: Odonata
- Infraorder: Anisoptera
- Family: Gomphidae
- Genus: Progomphus
- Species: P. bellei

Binomial name
- Progomphus bellei Knopf & Tennessen, 1980

Species of dragonfly

Progomphus bellei, the Belle's sanddragon, is a species of dragonfly in the family Gomphidae. It is endemic to the United States. Its natural habitats are rivers and freshwater lakes.
