= Euorodalus coenosus =

Scientific classification
- Kingdom: Animalia
- Phylum: Arthropoda
- Clade: Pancrustacea
- Class: Insecta
- Order: Coleoptera
- Suborder: Polyphaga
- Infraorder: Scarabaeiformia
- Family: Scarabaeidae
- Genus: Euorodalus
- Species: E. coenosus

Binomial name
- Euorodalus coenosus (Panzer, 1798)

Synonyms
- Scarabaeus coenosus Panzer, 1798; Aphodius putridicola Gistel, 1857; Scarabaeus tristis Zenker, 1801; Aphodius tristis fallax Mulsant, 1842; Aphodius tristis mirandus Mulsant, 1842; Aphodius tristis pellucidus Mulsant, 1842; Aphodius tristis scapularis Mulsant, 1842; Aphodius tristis vicinus Mulsant, 1842

Species of beetle

Euorodalus coenosus is a species of beetle of the family Scarabaeidae. It is found in Albania, Austria, Belarus, Belgium, Bulgaria, Denmark, Estonia, Finland, France, Germany, Great Britain, Latvia, Lithuania, the Netherlands, Norway, Poland, Portugal, Romania, Russia, Slovakia, Spain, Sweden, Switzerland, Turkey and Ukraine.

== Description ==
Adults reach a length of about 4–5 mm (0.16–0.20 in). They have an oval-elongate, strongly convex, glabrous body, with the head and pronotum shiny and the elytra dull. They are blackish, with the sides of the pronotum reddish and the elytra red.
