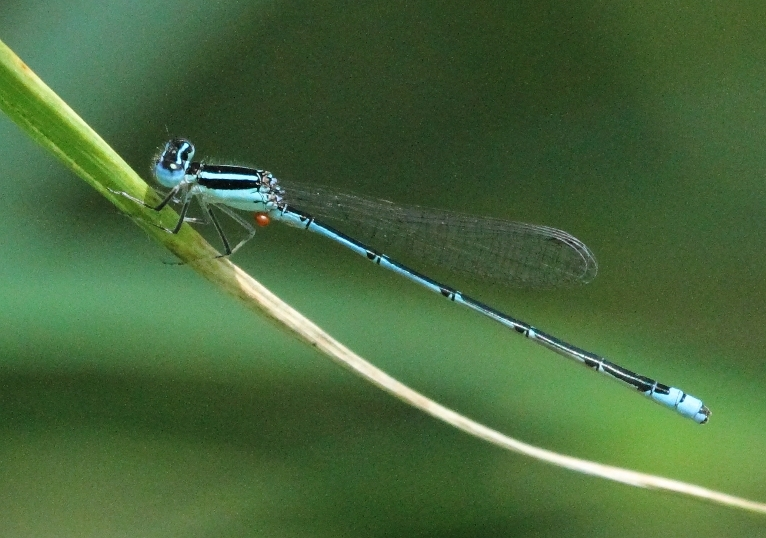
- Male

Conservation status
- Least Concern (IUCN 3.1)

Scientific classification
- Kingdom: Animalia
- Phylum: Arthropoda
- Class: Insecta
- Order: Odonata
- Suborder: Zygoptera
- Family: Coenagrionidae
- Genus: Azuragrion
- Species: A. nigridorsum

Binomial name
- Azuragrion nigridorsum (Selys, 1876)

= Azuragrion nigridorsum =

Species of damselfly

Azuragrion nigridorsum, the black-tailed bluet or sailing bluet, is a species of damselfly in family Coenagrionidae.

== Distribution and status ==
A common and widespread species with a range that extends from South Africa to Angola, Ethiopia, Oman, Yemen, Socotra, and Madagascar.

== Habitat ==
This damselfly is found in a wide variety of habitats including slow-flowing streams and ponds; both open and partly shaded habitats are used.

== Gallery ==
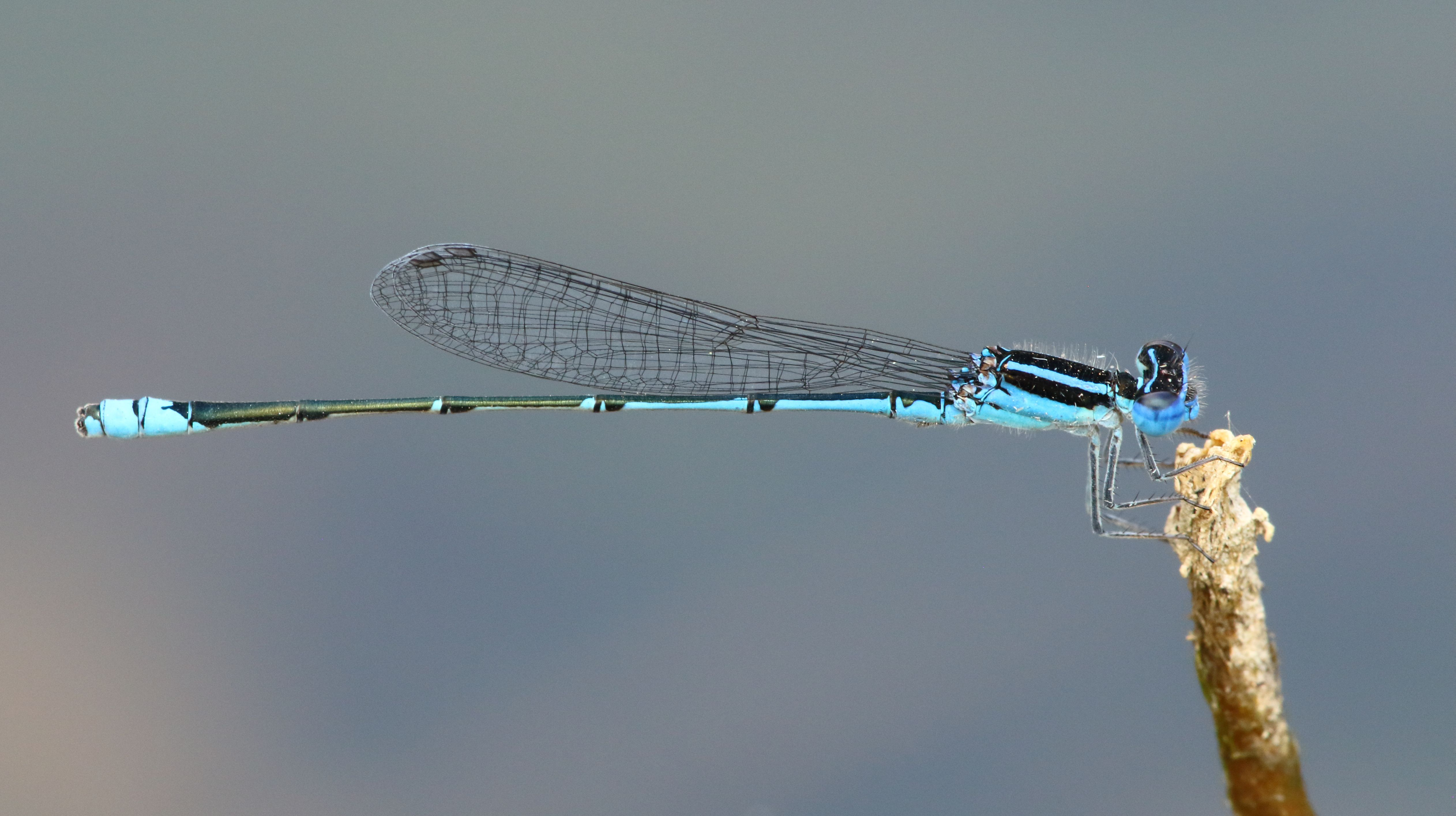
Male

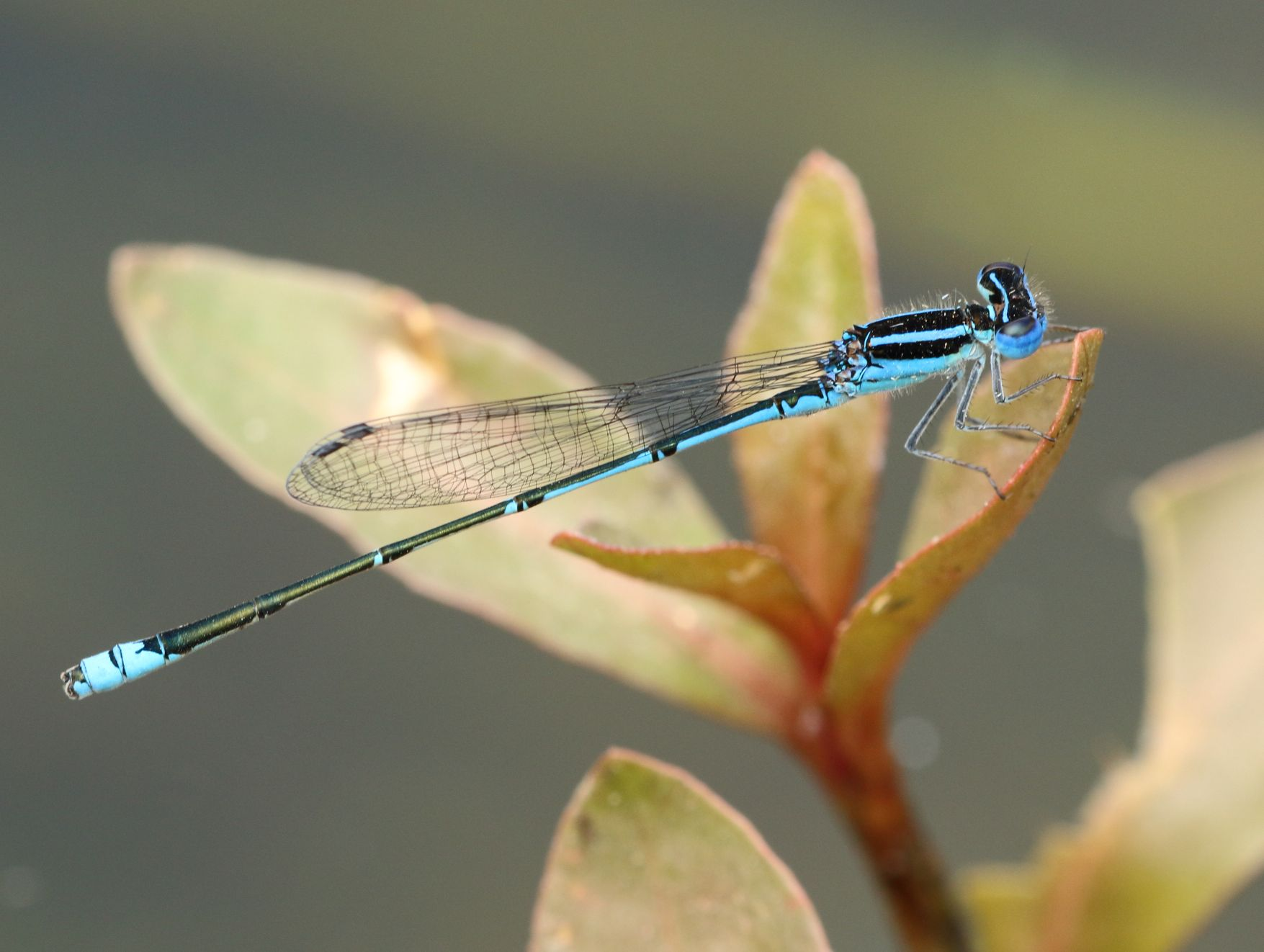
Male

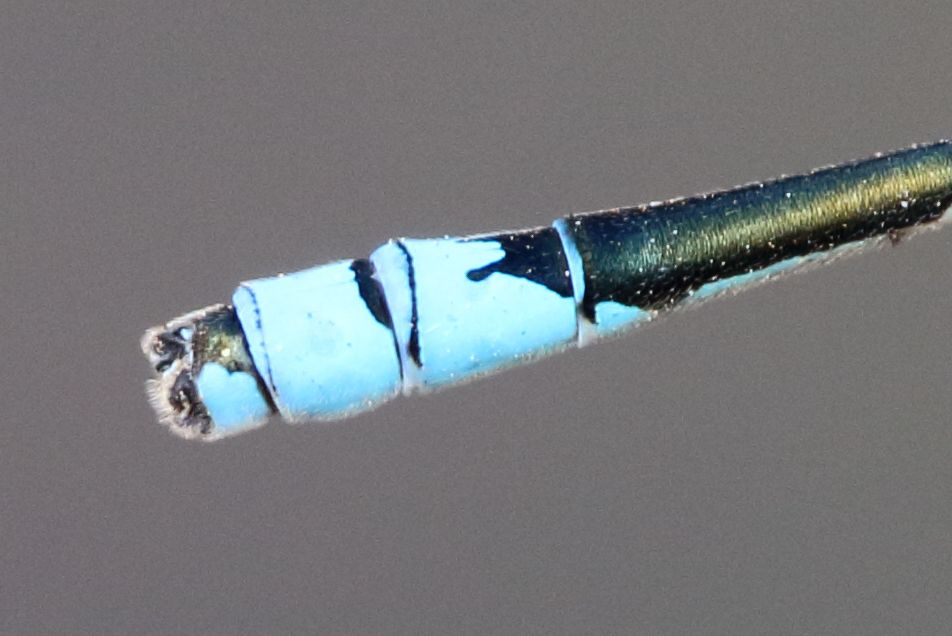
Tail (abdomen) of male
