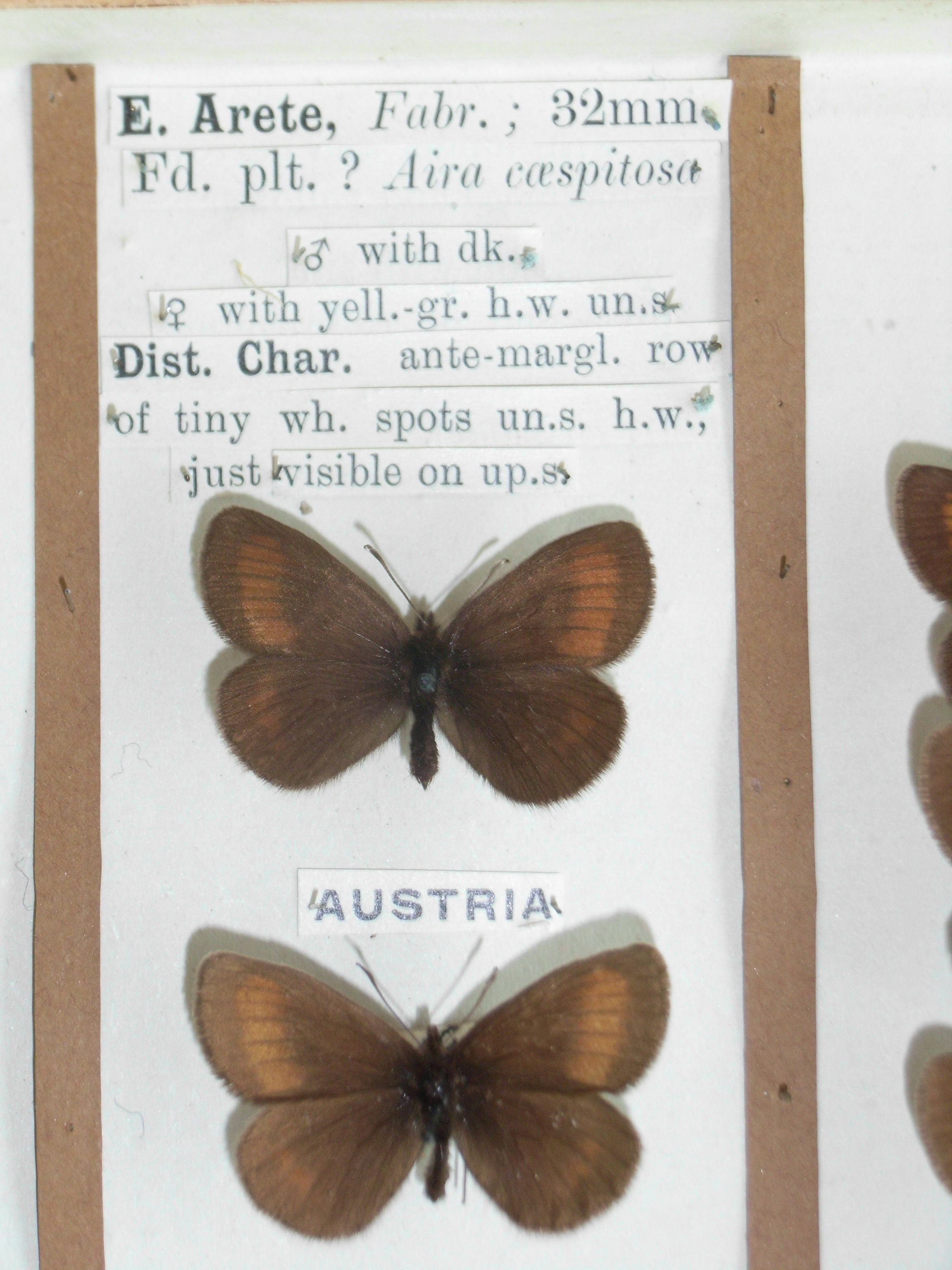
- As E. arete, a junior homonym of the valid name. From the Langham and Wheeler collection at the Ulster Museum.

Scientific classification
- Kingdom: Animalia
- Phylum: Arthropoda
- Class: Insecta
- Order: Lepidoptera
- Family: Nymphalidae
- Genus: Erebia
- Species: E. claudina

Binomial name
- Erebia claudina (Borkhausen, 1780)

= White speck ringlet =

Species of butterfly

The white speck ringlet (Erebia claudina) is a member of the subfamily Satyrinae of family Nymphalidae. It is a high-altitude butterfly found only in the Austrian Alps.

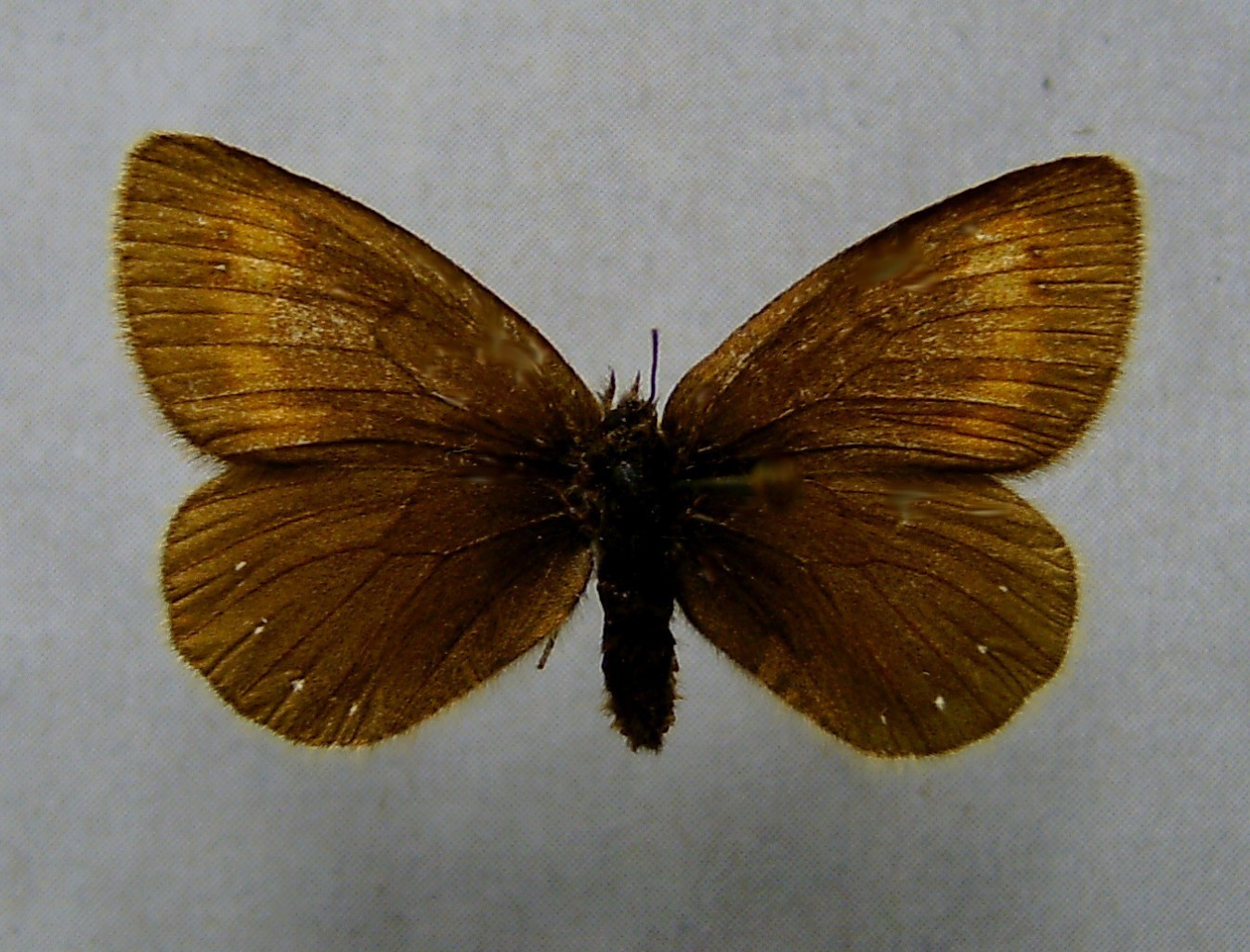

The wingspan is 26–32 mm.

== Description in Seitz ==
E. arete F. (nec Bell. = claudina Bkh.) (36 d). Forewing deep dark brown; the band red-brown, slightly interrupted by the veins, sharply defined proximally and distally and extending to the hind margin. There are two small white-centred ocelli in the band, which in the male are usually visible only on the underside. The brown band is either entirely absent from the hindwing or it is only represented by small brown spots. There are 4 — 5 white dots before the distal margin, which are hardly visible in the male, being sometimes absent, while they are always present and quite distinct in the female. The forewing beneath is dull red-brown in the male, the costal and distal margins being black-brown like the hindwing; in the female the costal margin and apex of forewing as well as the hindwing greenish-grey. Fringes but slightly lighter than the wing in the male, yellowish-grey in the female. Antenna black above, whitish beneath. In the Alps of Carinthia and Salzburg, in the Weissbriach valley, in July and August, said to occur only in the years with uneven numbers. — females with bone -yellow band and pure white fringes have been distinguished as ab.albofasciata Hofn. — The egg is described as being round and white. The larvae appeared after 11 days; they were light green with 6 dark longitudinal lines; they were fed on Aira caespitosa. Wheeler (1903) gives a short description (as arete)

The larvae feed on Nardus stricta, Deschampsia cespitosa and Poa trivalis.
