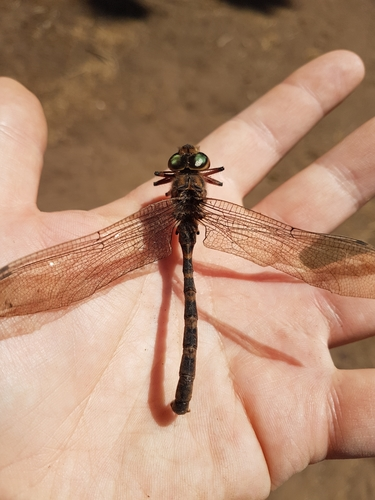
- Photo of Allopetalia reticulosa topdown view taken by Javier Conejeros Gastó in Chile

Conservation status
- Near Threatened (IUCN 3.1)

Scientific classification
- Kingdom: Animalia
- Phylum: Arthropoda
- Clade: Pancrustacea
- Class: Insecta
- Order: Odonata
- Infraorder: Anisoptera
- Family: Aeshnidae
- Genus: Allopetalia
- Species: A. reticulosa

Binomial name
- Allopetalia reticulosa Selys, 1873

= Allopetalia reticulosa =

Species of dragonfly

Allopetalia reticulosa is a species of dragonfly in the family Aeshnidae.

== Description ==
Allopetalia reticulosa is an overall brown dragonfly. Its eyes are black with a ring of brown ombre around the outside, they can also have greenish centers. The thorax is brown with black stripes and patterns. Similarly, the abdomen is also brown with a symmetrical black pattern marking the segments. They also appear to have an extra abdominal appendage in addition to their cerci. The wings have a brown wash of color over them and the pterostigmata are small and black in color.

== Habitat ==
Allopetalia reticulosa are found in central Chile, around Santiago. They prefer freshwater habits, like many dragonflies, because of their mode of reproduction.

== Conservation status ==
Most recently assessed in 2006, A. reticulosa is marked as being near threatened according to the IUCN. Its population trend is unknown.
