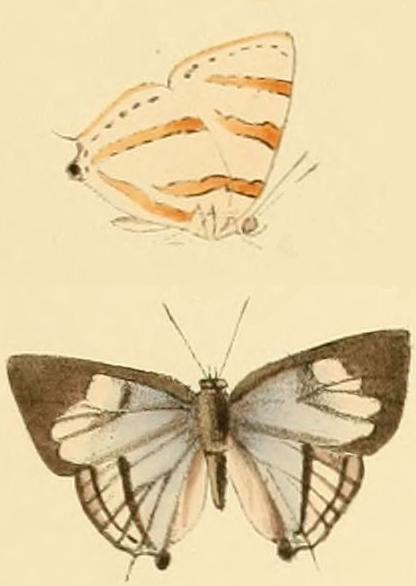

Conservation status
- Least Concern (IUCN 3.1)

Scientific classification
- Kingdom: Animalia
- Phylum: Arthropoda
- Class: Insecta
- Order: Lepidoptera
- Family: Lycaenidae
- Genus: Iolaus
- Species: I. aphnaeoides

Binomial name
- Iolaus aphnaeoides Trimen, 1873

Synonyms
- Iolaus canissus Hewitson, 1873

= Iolaus aphnaeoides =

Species of butterfly

Iolaus aphnaeoides, the yellow-banded sapphire, is a species of butterfly in the family Lycaenidae. It is endemic to South Africa, where it is restricted to the Afromontane forest of the Eastern Cape, along the southern foothills of the Winterberg, from Bedford to Stutterheim and low-altitude forests north of Port St. Johns.

The wingspan is 26–28 mm for males and 27–29 mm for females. Adults are on wing from October to January. There is one generation per year.

The larvae feed on Tapinanthus kraussianus.
