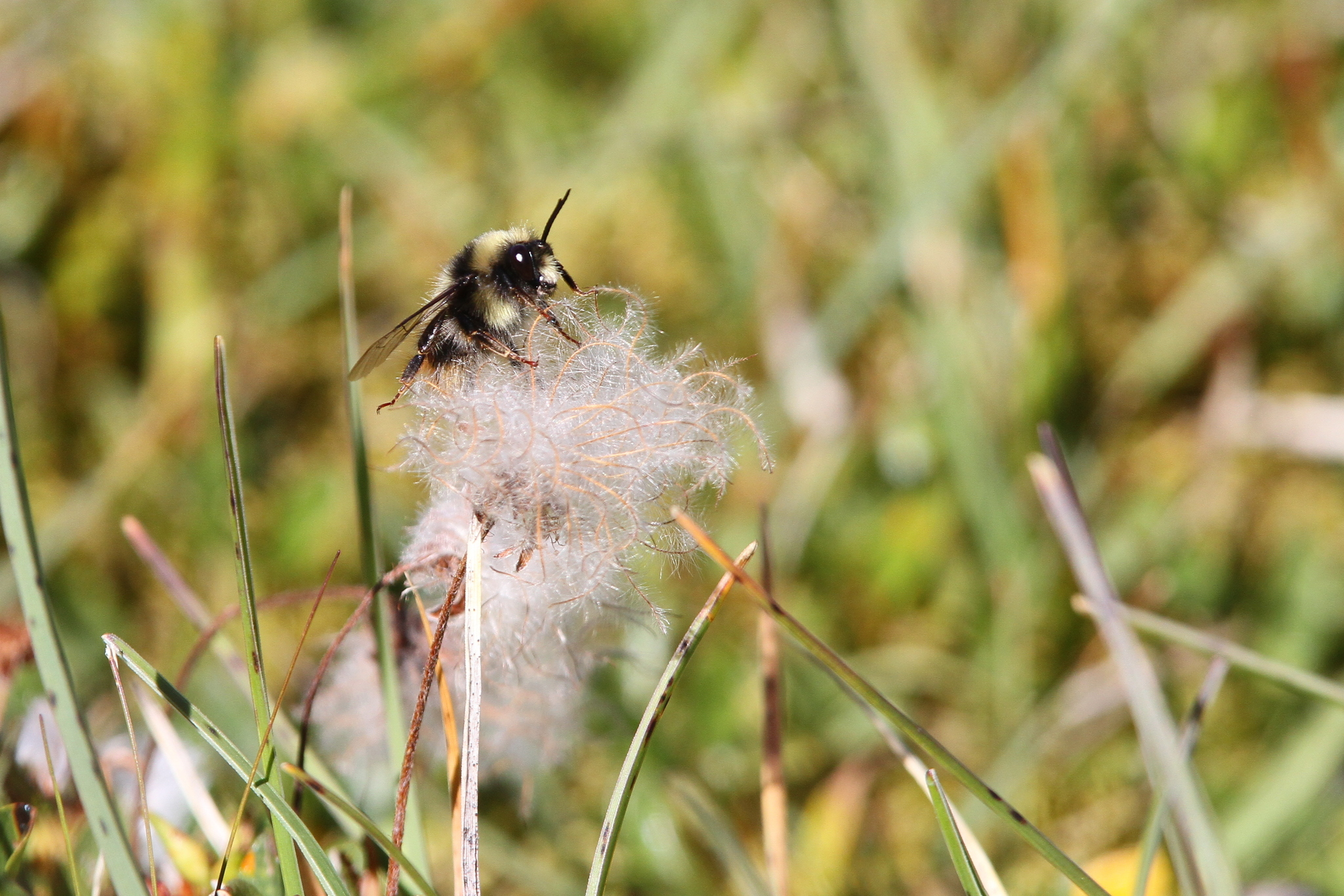

Conservation status
- Near Threatened (IUCN 3.1)

Scientific classification
- Domain: Eukaryota
- Kingdom: Animalia
- Phylum: Arthropoda
- Class: Insecta
- Order: Hymenoptera
- Family: Apidae
- Genus: Bombus
- Subgenus: Mendacibombus
- Species: B. mendax

Binomial name
- Bombus mendax Gerstäcker, 1869

= Bombus mendax =

Species of bee

Bombus mendax is a species of bumblebee. It is native to Europe, where it occurs in Andorra, Austria, France, Germany, Italy, Slovenia, Spain, and Switzerland.

This is an uncommon species. It lives in high mountains in the Alps and the Pyrenees. It occurs in alpine and subalpine climates, often in grassland habitat. It often creates its nests in burrows abandoned by rodents such as the European pine vole (Microtus subterraneus). It feeds at many kinds of flowers, especially those with long corollas.

This species may become more rare as climate change causes available high-mountain habitat to shrink.
