= Euorodalus boiteli =

Scientific classification
- Kingdom: Animalia
- Phylum: Arthropoda
- Clade: Pancrustacea
- Class: Insecta
- Order: Coleoptera
- Suborder: Polyphaga
- Infraorder: Scarabaeiformia
- Family: Scarabaeidae
- Genus: Euorodalus
- Species: E. boiteli

Binomial name
- Euorodalus boiteli (Thery, 1918)

Synonyms
- Aphodius (Volinus) boiteli Thery, 1918; Aphodius (Orodalus) baraudi Villareal, 1975

Species of beetle

Euorodalus boiteli is a species of beetle of the family Scarabaeidae. It is found in Morocco, Spain and Tunisia.

== Description ==
Adults reach a length of about 4.5–5.2 mm (0.18–0.20 in). They have a quite convex, shiny, black body. The elytra are yellowish-brown with a dark sutural interval and brownish-black spots. The legs and antennal club are dark.
