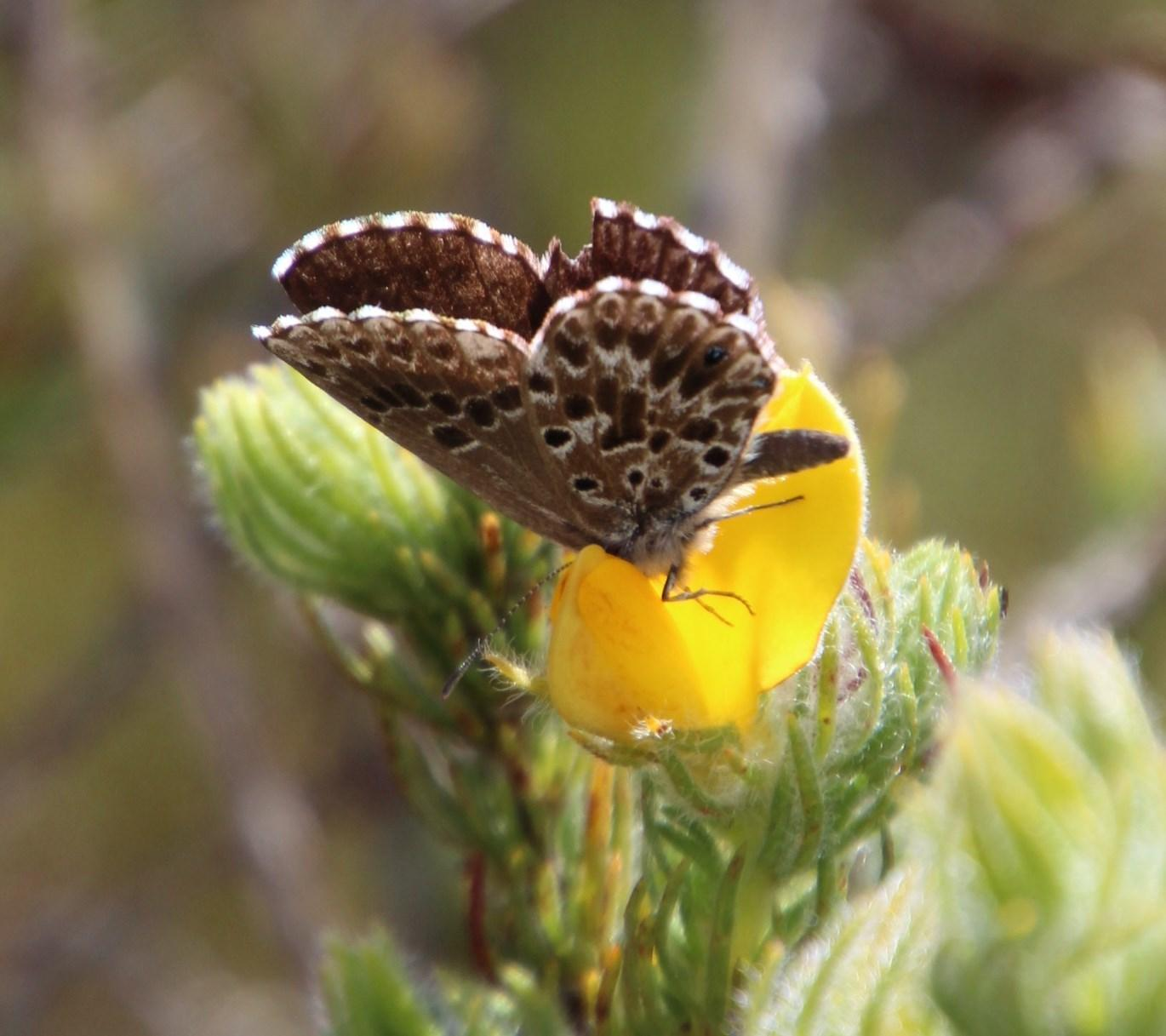
- In Overberg, Western Cape, South Africa

Conservation status
- Least Concern (IUCN 3.1)

Scientific classification
- Kingdom: Animalia
- Phylum: Arthropoda
- Class: Insecta
- Order: Lepidoptera
- Family: Lycaenidae
- Genus: Lepidochrysops
- Species: L. bacchus

Binomial name
- Lepidochrysops bacchus Riley, 1938

= Wineland blue =

Species of butterfly

The Wineland blue (Lepidochrysops bacchus) is a species of butterfly in the family Lycaenidae. It is endemic to South Africa, where it is found from the Western Cape to the Eastern Cape.

The wingspan is 22–29 mm for males and 24–30 mm for females. Adults are on wing from September to January. There is one generation per year.

The larvae feed on Selago fruticosa and Selago geniculata.
