= Eurysticta coomalie =

Coomalie pin

Conservation status
- Least Concern (IUCN 3.1)

Scientific classification
- Kingdom: Animalia
- Phylum: Arthropoda
- Clade: Pancrustacea
- Class: Insecta
- Order: Odonata
- Suborder: Zygoptera
- Family: Isostictidae
- Genus: Eurysticta
- Species: E. coomalie

Binomial name
- Eurysticta coomalie Watson, 1991

Species of damselfly

Eurysticta coomalie is a species of damselfly in the family Isostictidae, commonly known as a Coomalie pin. It is endemic to the northern area of Northern Territory of Australia, where it inhabits streams and pools.

Eurysticta coomalie is a small to medium-sized damselfly, pale brown with a bronze-green colouring.

== Gallery ==
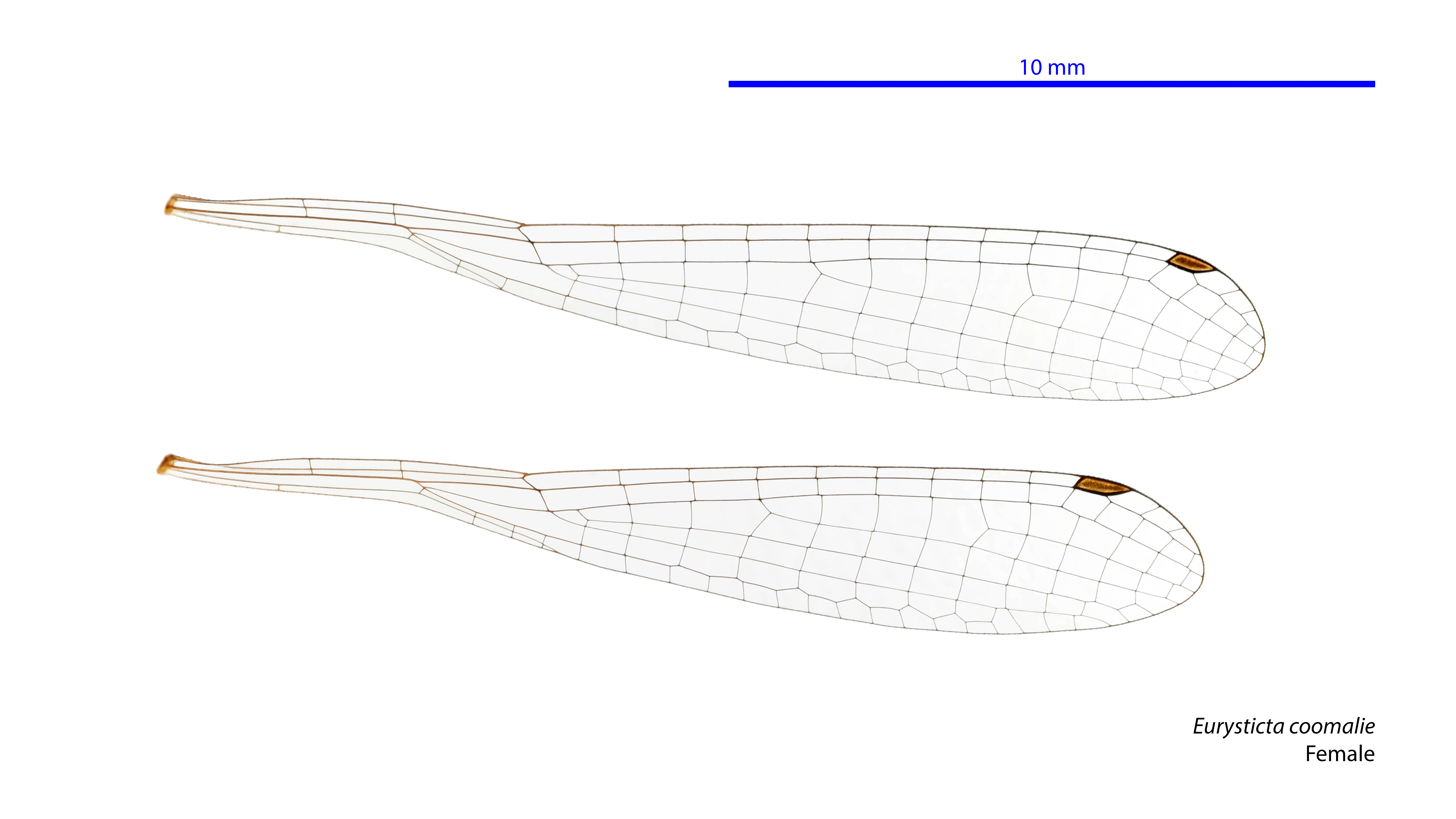
Female wings

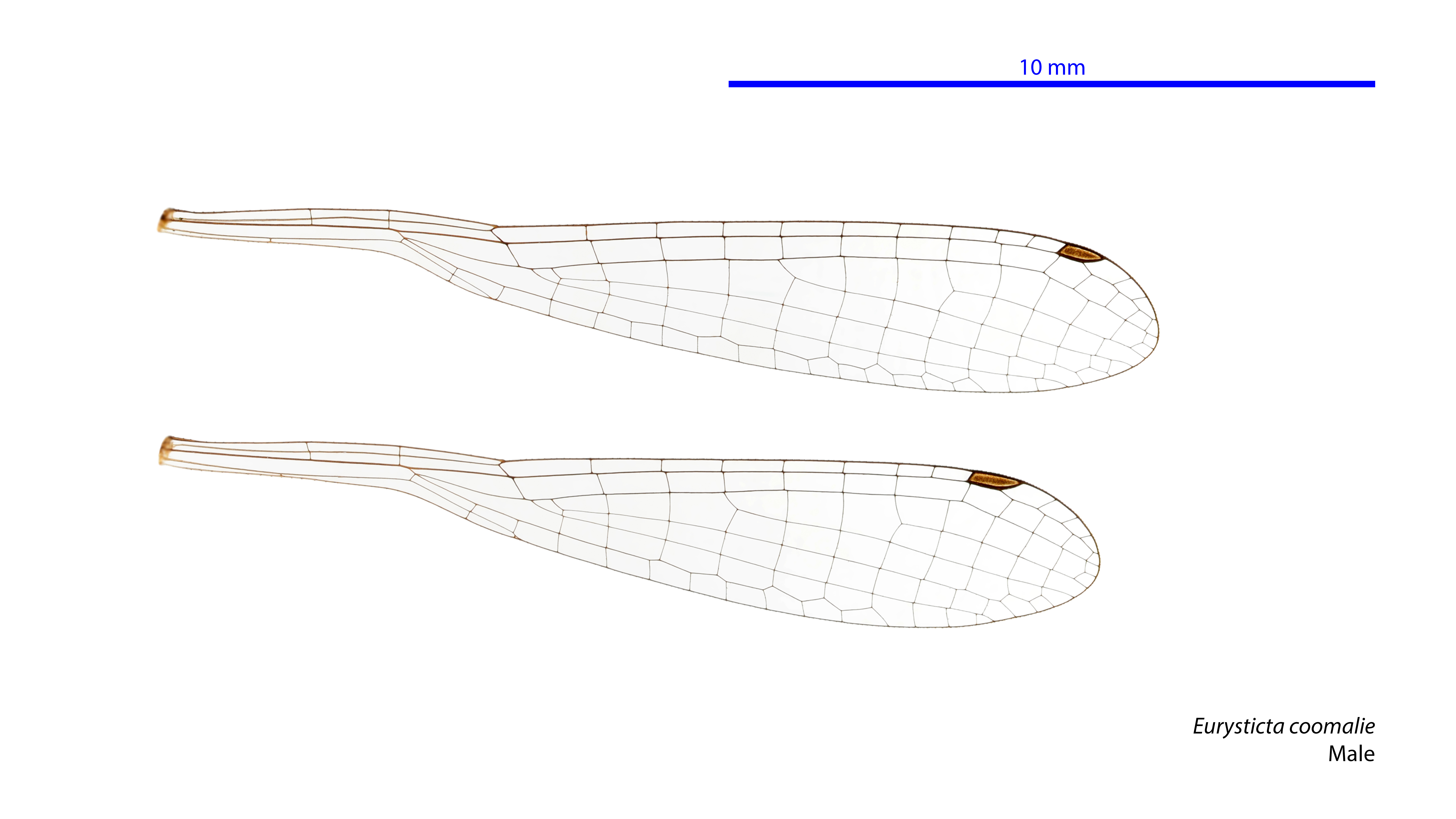
Male wings

== Etymology ==
The genus name Eurysticta is derived from the Greek εὐρύς (eurys, "wide" or "broad") and στικτός (stiktos, "spotted" or "marked"). The suffix -sticta is commonly used in names of taxa within the subfamily Isostictinae.

The species name coomalie is named for Coomalie Creek, the type locality in the Northern Territory.

== See also ==
- List of Odonata species of Australia
