= Papilio benguetanus =

Conservation status
- Near Threatened (IUCN 2.3)

Scientific classification
- Kingdom: Animalia
- Phylum: Arthropoda
- Clade: Pancrustacea
- Class: Insecta
- Order: Lepidoptera
- Family: Papilionidae
- Genus: Papilio
- Species: P. benguetanus

Binomial name
- Papilio benguetanus Joicey & Talbot, 1923

Species of butterfly

Papilio benguetanus is a species of butterfly in the family Papilionidae. It is endemic to the Philippines.
