= Alocoderus carinifrons =

Scientific classification
- Kingdom: Animalia
- Phylum: Arthropoda
- Clade: Pancrustacea
- Class: Insecta
- Order: Coleoptera
- Suborder: Polyphaga
- Infraorder: Scarabaeiformia
- Family: Scarabaeidae
- Genus: Alocoderus
- Species: A. carinifrons

Binomial name
- Alocoderus carinifrons (Reitter, 1892)

Synonyms
- Aphodius (Amidorus) carinifrons Reitter, 1892

Species of beetle

Alocoderus carinifrons is a species of beetle of the family Scarabaeidae. It is found in Morocco.

== Description ==
Adults reach a length of about 5–7 mm (0.20–0.28 in). They have a glossy, light or dark chestnut-brown body. The underside is lighter brown.
