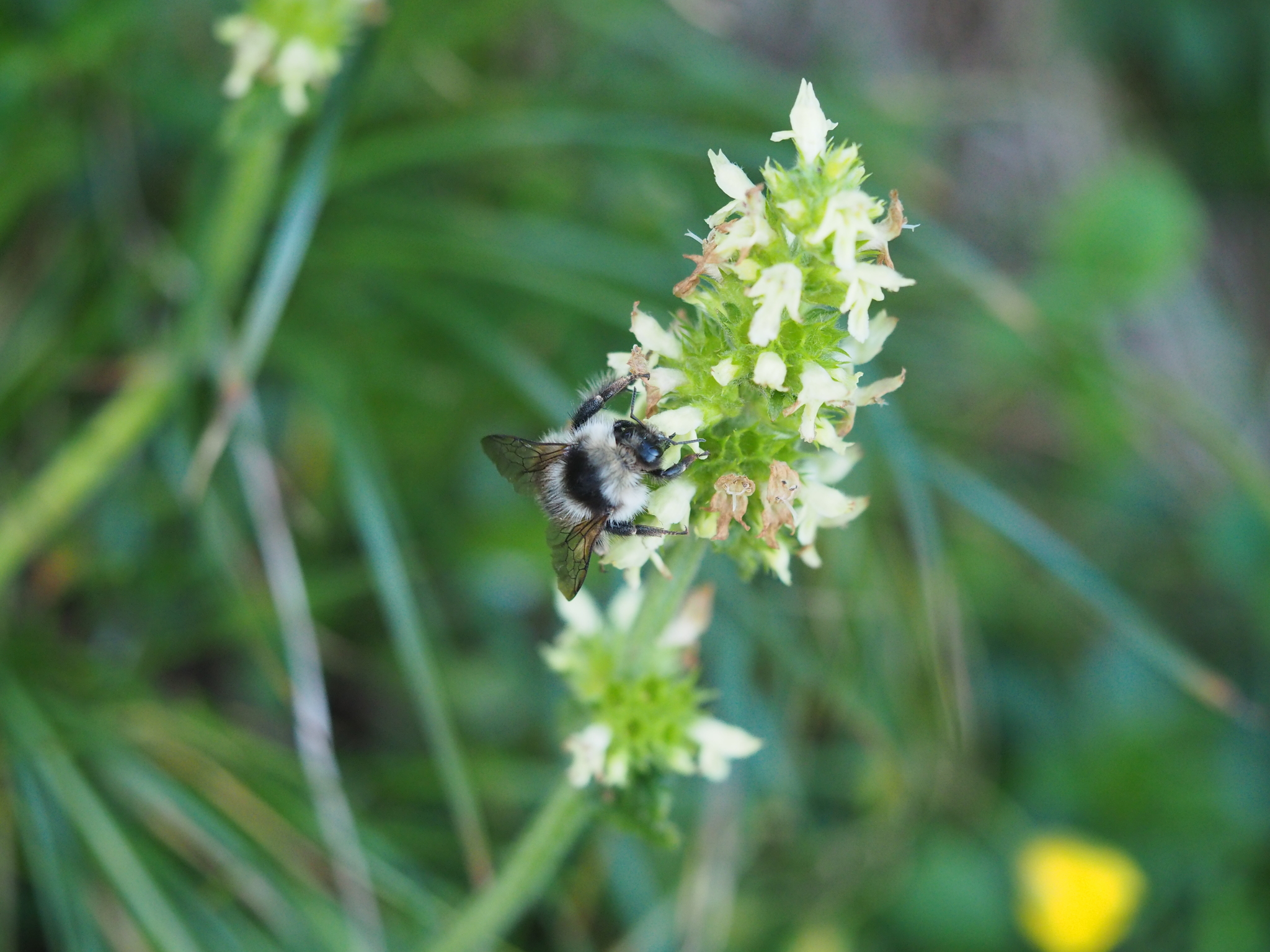

Conservation status
- Near Threatened (IUCN 3.1)

Scientific classification
- Domain: Eukaryota
- Kingdom: Animalia
- Phylum: Arthropoda
- Class: Insecta
- Order: Hymenoptera
- Family: Apidae
- Genus: Bombus
- Subgenus: Thoracobombus
- Species: B. mucidus

Binomial name
- Bombus mucidus Gerstäcker, 1869

Synonyms
- Bombus atratus; Bombus mollis

= Bombus mucidus =

Species of bee

Bombus mucidus is a species of bumblebee. It is native to southern Europe. The species' local common names include Grauweiße Hummel.

This is a species of high-altitude mountain habitat. It occurs in the mountain ranges of southern Europe, including the Cordillera Cantábrica, the Pyrenees, the Alps, the Apennines, the Balkans, the Carpathians, and the Crna Gora Mountains. It occurs in prefers the warmer southern slopes, where it lives in subalpine grassland habitat. It feeds on many kinds of plants.

This species has a fragmented distribution because it is limited to high mountains across the region. It is susceptible to population declines caused by climate change, as cooler mountain habitat shrinks. It is still common in some areas of its range.
