= Anomius peyerimhoffi =

Scientific classification
- Kingdom: Animalia
- Phylum: Arthropoda
- Clade: Pancrustacea
- Class: Insecta
- Order: Coleoptera
- Suborder: Polyphaga
- Infraorder: Scarabaeiformia
- Family: Scarabaeidae
- Genus: Anomius
- Species: A. peyerimhoffi

Binomial name
- Anomius peyerimhoffi (Théry, 1925)

Synonyms
- Aphodius (Amidorus) peyerimhoffi Théry, 1925

Species of beetle

Anomius peyerimhoffi is a species of beetle of the family Scarabaeidae. It is found in Morocco.

== Description ==
Adults reach a length of about 5–7 mm (0.20–0.28 in). The upper surface is glabrous and shining. The head, pronotum and scutellum are somewhat darker brown or more reddish and the elytra are light yellowish-brown to light chestnut-brown. The sutural margin is somewhat darkened.
