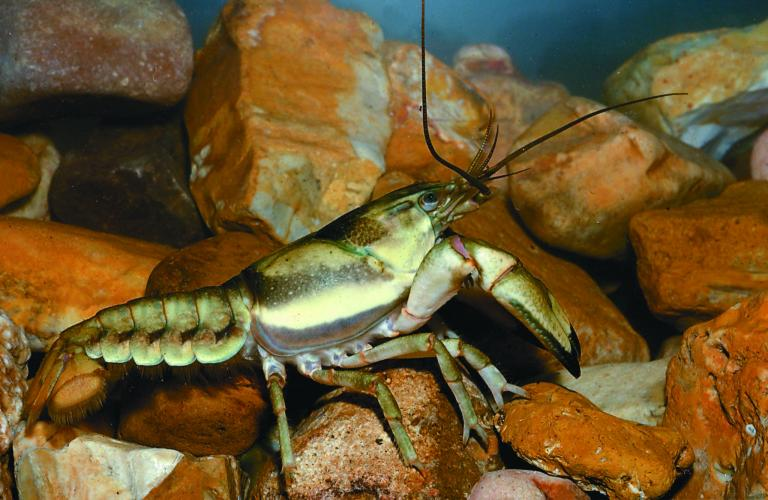

Conservation status
- Least Concern (IUCN 3.1)

- Secure (NatureServe)

Scientific classification
- Kingdom: Animalia
- Phylum: Arthropoda
- Clade: Pancrustacea
- Class: Malacostraca
- Order: Decapoda
- Suborder: Pleocyemata
- Family: Cambaridae
- Genus: Faxonius
- Species: F. neglectus

Binomial name
- Faxonius neglectus (Faxon, 1885)

Subspecies
- F. n. neglectus (Faxon, 1885); F. n. chaenodactylus (Williams, 1952)

Synonyms
- Orconectes neglectus Faxon, 1885

= Faxonius neglectus =

Species of freshwater crayfish

Faxonius neglectus, a species of freshwater crayfish also known as the ringed crayfish, is native to Central North America, with two major disjunct areas of distribution in the Ozarks and around Nebraska. The species name, Faxonius neglectus, was previously Orconectes neglectus (before this, Faxonius was a subgenus of Orconectes). Faxonius was declared its own genus in 2017 by Crandall & De Grave, as many previously thought Orconectes species were found to not reside in caves (a quality of Orconectes).

== Description and ecology ==
There are two subspecies of F. neglectus: F. neglectus chaenodactylus (also known as the gapped ringed crayfish or the gap-ringed crayfish) and F. neglectus neglectus. F. neglectus has a uniquely marked decapod anatomy, which includes a wide ring on the rostrum in combination with a dark brown wide ring on the dactyl and propodus of the crayfish's chelipeds, ending in bright red/orange. The third maxilliped ends in a scalloped appearance. The color of the carapace can range from a light brown or yellow color, just rear of the cephalic groove, being banded by a dark brown ring.

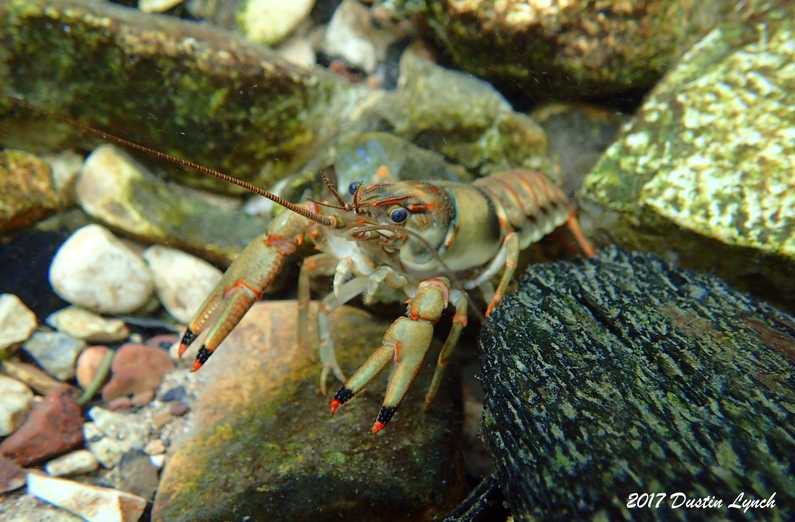
Faxonius neglectus neglectus, showcasing distinctive banded claws that are unique to this species.

Evidence of sexual dimorphism has not been observed to be present for this species. Adult carapace length is an average of 32 mm (1.3 in) for males and females. During F. n. chaenodactylus's initial year of life, the average number of molts performed is 8, followed by 4, 3, 4, 4, and 4 molts for each year after. Mating is polygonous, resulting in size based dominance.

Like many other decapods, F. neglectus consumes algae and detritus within the environments that they occupy.

=== Males ===
In F. neglectus males, there is the presence of the pleopods (swimmerets) being curved towards the tail. Males have been documented to reach maturity within 8 months, but the growth of immature F. n. chaenodactylus is dependent upon temperature fluctuations during this time. The average maximum age for F. n. chaenodactylus males is 5 years, with the average age being 3 years.

=== Females ===
The average maximum age for F. n. chaenodactylus females is 4 years, with the average age being 3 years.

== Habitat ==
=== Native range ===
Faxonius neglectus has two allopatric populations:

==== Faxonius neglectus neglectus ====
The native range for F. n. neglectus is disjunct between a population in the Boston Mountains and Ozark Highlands of Arkansas, Kansas, Missouri, and Oklahoma, and a western and central Nebraska-centered population also occurring in adjacent Colorado, Kansas, and Wyoming. There are also isolated records of this taxon western Colorado west of the continental divide (i.e., in the Pacific drainage and not the Atlantic drainage like other known populations). Many of these northern populations were once considered relict populations, but recent work has shown that F. n. neglectus is widespread within the western two thirds of Nebraska and surrounding adjacent drainages, including the basins of the Kansas (mostly the tributaries of the Republican and Big Blue), the Niobrara, and the Platte (including the Loup) rivers.

==== Faxonius neglectus chaenodactylus ====
Restricted to drainages of the White River in both Arkansas and Missouri.

=== Invasive range ===
F. neglectus has been documented as an invasive species in the Hudson River's Croton River drainage of southeastern New York, and the Housatonic River drainage of Connecticut. F. neglectus is an invasive species in the Spring River (Arkansas) drainage of the Ozarks. Where F. neglectus colonizes, the native species, Faxonius eupunctus and Cambarus hubbsi, are no longer present, despite having been previously observed in those areas.
