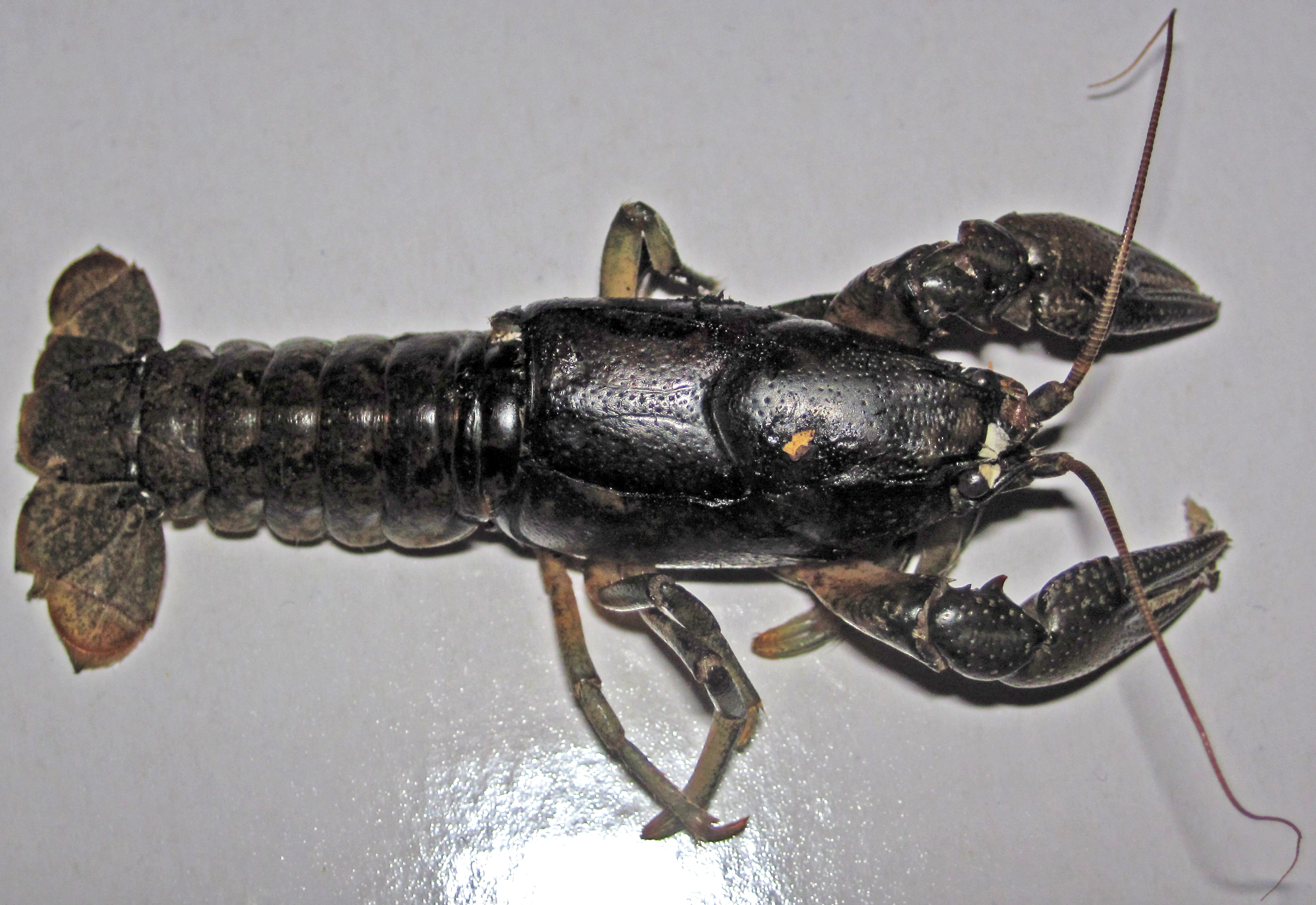
- Faxonius sanbornii

Conservation status
- Least Concern (IUCN 3.1)

- Secure (NatureServe)

Scientific classification
- Kingdom: Animalia
- Phylum: Arthropoda
- Class: Malacostraca
- Order: Decapoda
- Suborder: Pleocyemata
- Family: Cambaridae
- Genus: Faxonius
- Species: F. sanbornii

Binomial name
- Faxonius sanbornii (Faxon, 1884)

Synonyms
- Orconectes sanbornii

= Faxonius sanbornii =

Species of crayfish

Faxonius sanbornii, the Sanborn or Sanborn's crayfish, is a species of crayfish native to Ohio and other areas in the midwest. It has been greatly affected by the invasive Rusty crayfish in many river habitats in Ohio and West Virginia, however it is regarded as Least Concern by the IUCN, and it has been introduced to Washington.

There is, possibly, one sub-species F. sanbornii erismophorous which is not accepted by all authorities.
