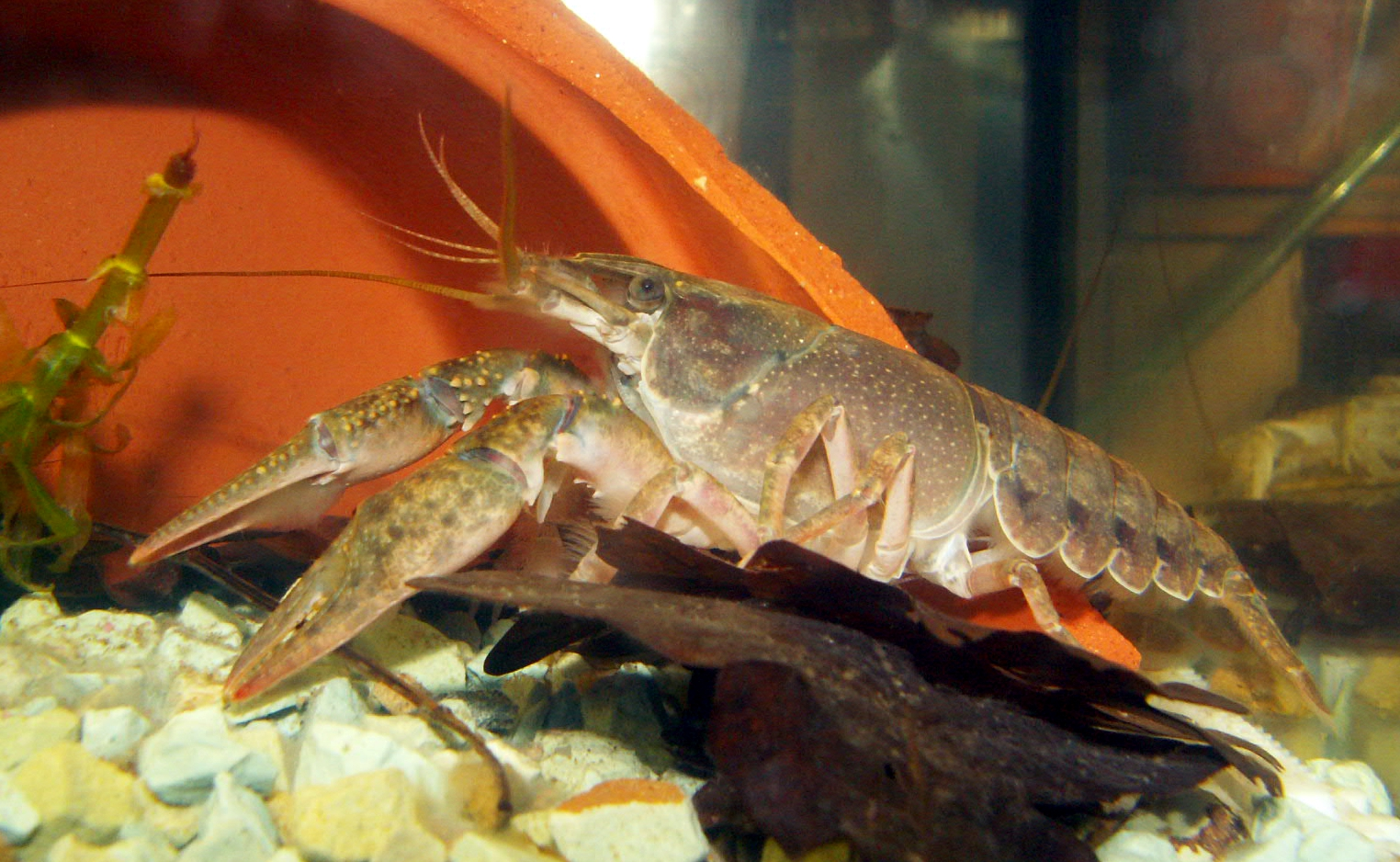

Conservation status
- Least Concern (IUCN 3.1)

- Secure (NatureServe)

Scientific classification
- Kingdom: Animalia
- Phylum: Arthropoda
- Clade: Pancrustacea
- Class: Malacostraca
- Order: Decapoda
- Suborder: Pleocyemata
- Family: Cambaridae
- Genus: Faxonius
- Species: F. immunis

Binomial name
- Faxonius immunis (Hagen, 1870)

Synonyms
- Cambarus immunis Hagen, 1870; Cambarus signifer Herrick, 1882; Cambarus immunis var. spinirostris Faxon, 1884; Faxonius immunis pedianus Creaser, 1933; Orconectes immunis (Hagen, 1870)

= Faxonius immunis =

Species of crayfish

Faxonius immunis is a species of crayfish in the family Cambaridae. It is native to North America and it is an introduced species in Europe, where it lives along the Upper Rhine. Its common names include calico crayfish and papershell crayfish.

== Taxonomy ==
Faxonius immunis was first described by Hermann August Hagen in 1870, in his Monograph of the North American Astacidae, under the name Cambarus immunis. The original specimens came from Lawn Ridge, Marshall County, Illinois.

== Description ==
Faxonius immunis is similar to a number of species of crayfish in the genus Faxonius. While the colouration of the claws is distinctive, it can be difficult to use that to identify a specimen without reference specimens for comparison. F. immunis can be distinguished from F. virilis by the presence of a notch near the base of the dactylus (finger) of the claw, which is not found in F. virilis.

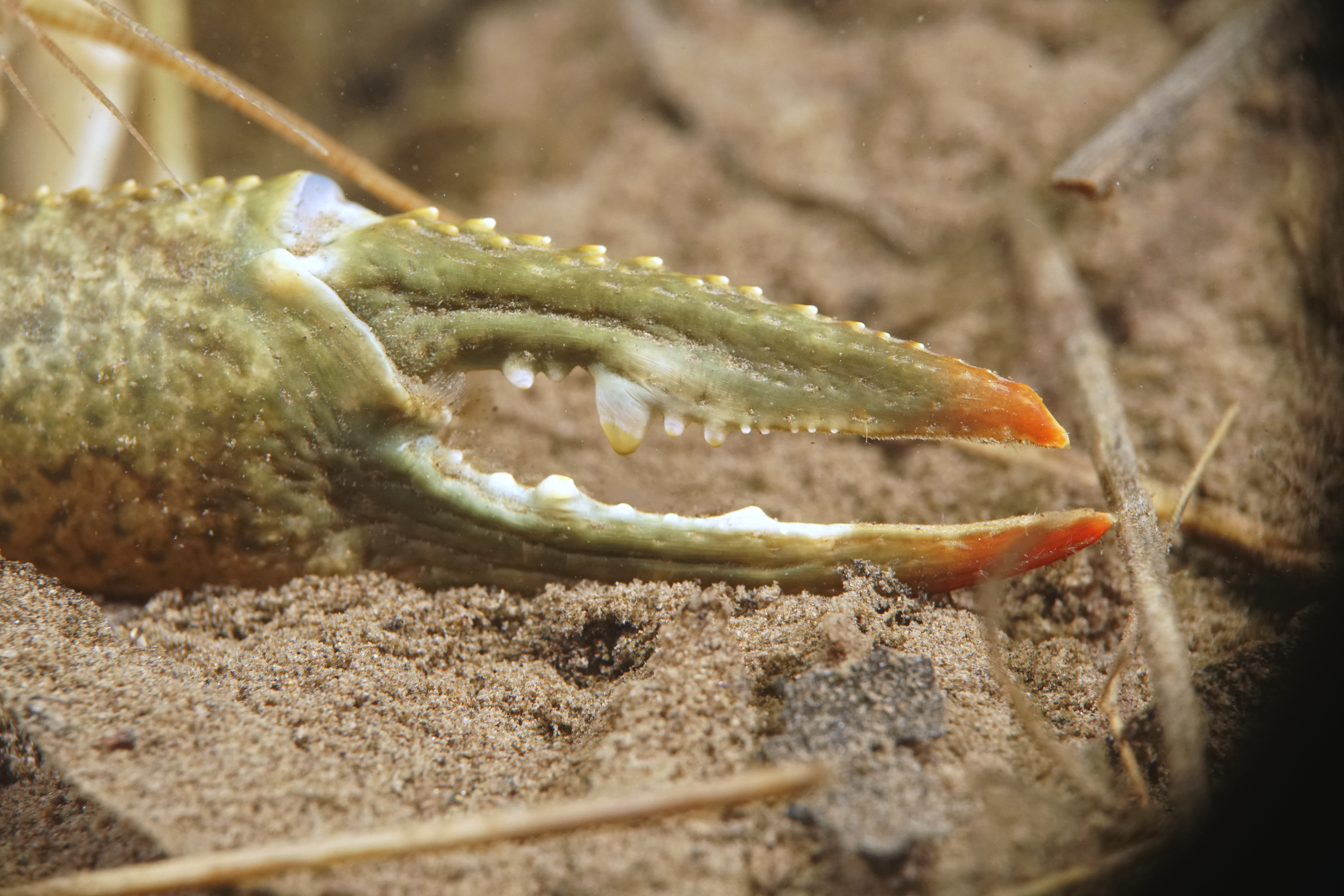
Faxonius immunis has claws with red tips.

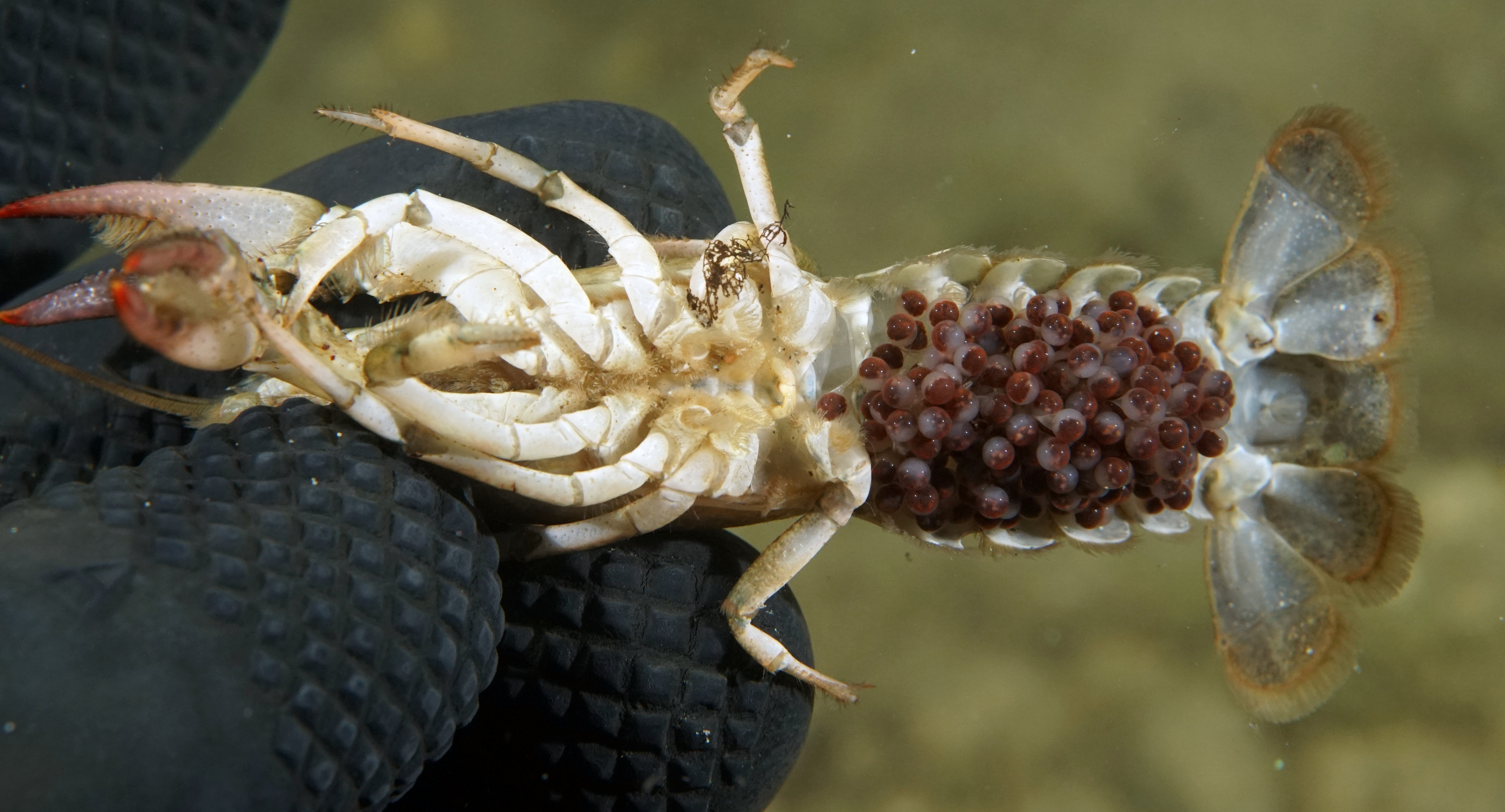
The calico crayfish has a high reproduction rate.

== Distribution and habitat ==
=== North America ===
Faxonius immunis naturally occurs across a wide area of eastern North America, from Maine and Connecticut in the east to Colorado and Wyoming in the west, and from Alabama in the south and north to Manitoba, Ontario and Quebec in Canada. Populations in Quebec may be the result of introductions by anglers from New York; the Canadian populations are centered in southern Ontario. It is believed to have been introduced to a number of states in New England, including Massachusetts, Maine, New Hampshire, Rhode Island and Vermont.

=== Europe ===
Faxonius immunis has been popular in the aquarium trade in Germany, and is kept as a pet both in aquaria and garden ponds. The first recorded escape was a single individual in a small canal in the Rhine valley of Baden-Württemberg in 1997. Later, a breeding population was discovered, and this has now spread at least as far downstream as Karlsruhe (45 km or 28 mi downstream) and possibly as far as Speyer (35 km or 22 mi downstream from Karlsruhe). It has since been recorded from other locations in Europe, including the German state of Rhineland-Palatinate, as well as in France. It appears to be out-competing another invasive species, F. limosus, which has been present in the area for five decades. Due to the significant negative impacts of its introduction to the ecosystem, the European Union has included it in the list of invasive alien species of Union concern and hence it cannot be imported, bred, transported, commercialized, or intentionally released into the environment in any of its member states.

=== Habitat ===
Faxonius immunis is only found in slow-flowing bodies of water, such as streams, ponds, marshes and roadside ditches, in contrast to F. virilis which also lives in rivers with moderate flow. It can survive in areas with large fluctuations in the amount of available water, by burrowing into the ground when the surface waters recede.
