= List of invasive alien species of Union concern =

Regulatory list of the European Union

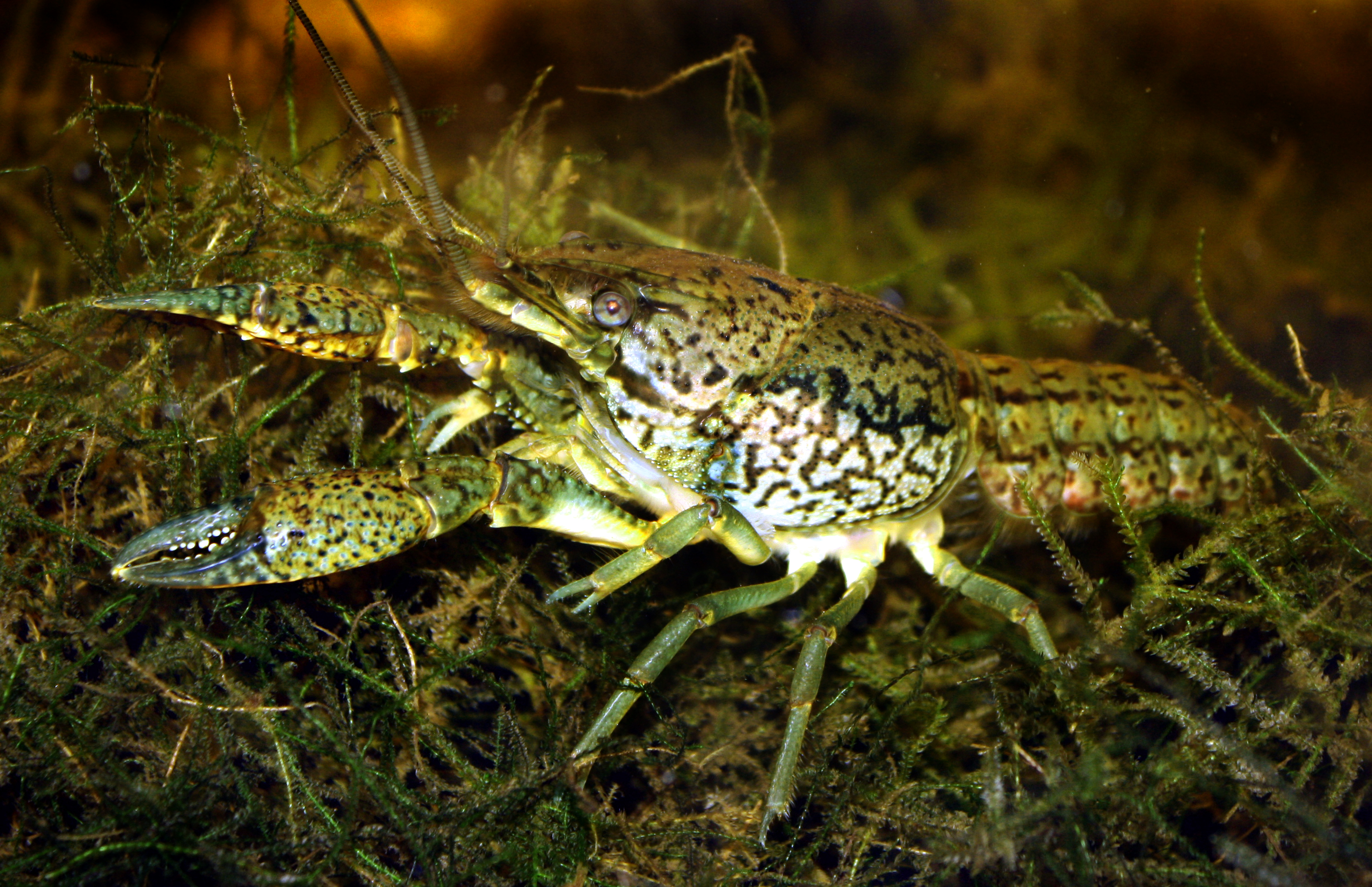
Procambarus virginalis (marbled crayfish), caught from an established population in southwestern Germany.

The list of invasive alien species of Union concern is a regulatory list of invasive animals and plants whose introduction and spread within the European Union are strictly prohibited due to their significant negative impact on the natural environment, economy, or human health. First published in 2016, it has been updated multiple times and it currently consists of 114 species, of which 65 are animals and 49 are plants. (Note: As of March 2026.)

== History ==
In 2016, following the EU Regulation 1143/2014 on Invasive Alien Species (IAS), the European Commission published a first list of 37 IAS of Union concern. The list was first updated in 2017 and comprised 49 species. Since the second update in 2019, 66 species are listed as IAS of EU concern. Since the third update in 2022, 88 species are listed as IAS of EU concern, although the final inclusion of three of these species has been deferred to 2024, and one to 2027. Finally, in 2025 further 26 species were added, so the list now contains 114 species.

== Regulations ==
The species on the list are subject to restrictions on keeping, importing, selling, breeding and growing. Member States of the European Union must take measures to stop their spread, implement monitoring and preferably eradicate these species. Even countries in which they are already widespread are expected to manage the species to avoid further spread.

== Full list ==
Picture	Scientific name	English name	Taxonomic group	Entry into force
	Acacia mearnsii De Wild., Pl. Bequaert.	Black wattle	Plantae	2025
	Acacia saligna (Labill.) H.L.Wendl.	Golden wreath wattle	Plantae	2019
	Acridotheres cristatellus (Linnaeus, 1758)	Crested myna	Aves	2025
	Acridotheres tristis Linnaeus, 1766	Common or Indian myna	Aves	2019
	Ailanthus altissima (Mill.) Swingle	Tree of heaven	Plantae	2019
	Alopochen aegyptiaca Linnaeus, 1766	Egyptian goose	Aves	2017
	Alternanthera philoxeroides (Mart.) Griseb.	Alligator weed	Plantae	2017
	Ameiurus melas	Black bullhead	Pisces	2022
	Andropogon virginicus L.	Broomsedge bluestem	Plantae	2019
	Arthurdendyus triangulatus (Dendy, 1894) Jones & Gerard (1999)	New Zealand flatworm	Platyhelminthes	2019
	Asclepias syriaca L.	Milkweed	Plantae	2017
	Asterias amurensis Lutken, 1871	Northern Pacific seastar	Echinodermata	2025
	Axis axis	Chital	Mammalia	2022
	Baccharis halimifolia L.	Eastern baccharis	Plantae	2016
	Bipalium kewense Moseley, 1868	Shovel-headed garden worm	Platyhelminthes	2025
	Brachyponera chinensis (Emery, 1895)	Asian needle ant	Insecta	2025
	Broussonetia papyrifera (L.) L'Hér ex Vent.	Paper mulberry	Plantae	2025
	Cabomba caroliniana Gray	Green cabomba	Plantae	2016
	Callosciurus erythraeus Pallas, 1779	Pallas's squirrel	Mammalia	2016
	Callosciurus finlaysonii	Finlayson's squirrel	Mammalia	2022
	Cardiospermum grandiflorum Sw.	Balloon vine	Plantae	2019
	Castor canadensis Kuhl, 1820	North American beaver	Mammalia	2027 (2025)
	Celastrus orbiculatus	Oriental bittersweet	Plantae	2027 (2022)
	Cervus nippon Temminck, 1838	Sika deer	Mammalia	2025
	Channa argus	Northern snakehead	Pisces	2022
	Cherax destructor Clark, 1936	Common yabby	Crustacea	2025
	Cipangopaludina chinensis (Gray 1834)	Chinese mystery snail	Mollusca	2025
	Cortaderia jubata (Lemoine ex Carrière) Stapf	Purple pampas grass	Plantae	2019
	Corvus splendens Vieillot, 1817	Indian house crow	Aves	2016
	Crassula helmsii (Kirk) Cockayne	Swamp stonecrop	Plantae	2025
	Delairea odorata Lem.		Plantae	2025
	Ehrharta calycina Sm.	Perennial veldtgrass	Plantae	2019
	Eichhornia crassipes (Martius) Solms	Water hyacinth	Plantae	2016
	Elodea nuttallii (Planch.) St. John	Nuttall's waterweed	Plantae	2017
	Eriocheir sinensis H. Milne Edwards, 1854	Chinese mitten crab	Crustacea	2016
	Faxonius immunis (Hagen, 1870)	Calico crayfish	Crustacea	2025
	Faxonius rusticus	Rusty crayfish	Crustacea	2022
	Fundulus heteroclitus	Mummichog	Pisces	2024 (2022)
	Gambusia affinis	Western mosquitofish	Pisces	2022
	Gambusia holbrooki	Eastern mosquitofish	Pisces	2022
	Gunnera tinctoria (Molina) Mirbel	Chilean rhubarb	Plantae	2017
	Gymnocoronis spilanthoides (D.Don ex Hook. & Arn.) DC.	Spadeleaf plant	Plantae	2019
	Hakea sericea	Needlebush	Plantae	2022
	Heracleum mantegazzianum Sommier & Levier	Giant hogweed	Plantae	2017
	Heracleum persicum Fischer	Persian hogweed	Plantae	2016
	Heracleum sosnowskyi Mandenova	Sosnowski's hogweed	Plantae	2016
	Herpestes javanicus É. Geoffroy Saint-Hilaire, 1818	Small Asian mongoose	Mammalia	2016
	Humulus scandens (Lour.) Merr.	Japanese hop	Plantae	2019
	Hydrocotyle ranunculoides L. f.	Floating pennywort	Plantae	2016
	Impatiens glandulifera Royle	Himalayan balsam	Plantae	2017
	Koenigia polystachya	Himalayan knotweed	Plantae	2022
	Lagarosiphon major (Ridley) Moss	Curly waterweed	Plantae	2016
	Lampropeltis getula	Common kingsnake	Reptilia	2022
	Lepomis gibbosus Linnaeus, 1758	Pumpkinseed	Pisces	2019
	Lespedeza cuneata (Dum.Cours.) G.Don	Chinese bushclover, sericea	Plantae	2019
	Limnoperna fortunei	Golden mussel	Mollusca	2022
	Lithobates catesbeianus Shaw, 1802	American bullfrog	Amphibia	2016
	Ludwigia grandiflora (Michx.) Greuter & Burdet	Water primrose	Plantae	2016
	Ludwigia peploides (Kunth) P.H. Raven	Floating primrose	Plantae	2016
	Lygodium japonicum (Thunb.) Sw.	Vine-like fern	Plantae	2019
	Lysichiton americanus Hultén & H. St. John	American skunk cabbage	Plantae	2016
	Marisa cornuarietis (Linnaeus 1758)	Colombian ramshorn apple snail	Mollusca	2025
	Microstegium vimineum (Trin.) A. Camus	Japanese stiltgrass	Plantae	2017
	Misgurnus anguillicaudatus (Cantor, 1842)	Pond loach	Pisces	2025
	Misgurnus bipartitus (Sauvage & Dabry de Thiersant, 1874)		Pisces	2025
	Morone americana	White perch	Pisces	2022
	Mulinia lateralis (Say, 1822)	Dwarf surf clam	Mollusca	2025
	Muntiacus reevesi Ogilby, 1839	Muntjac deer	Mammalia	2016
	Myocastor coypus Molina, 1782	Coypu, Nutria	Mammalia	2016
	Myriophyllum aquaticum (Vell.) Verdc.	Parrot's feather	Plantae	2016
	Myriophyllum heterophyllum Michaux	Broadleaf watermilfoil	Plantae	2017
	Nanozostera japonica (Ascherson & Graebner) Tomlinson & Posluszny, 2001	Dwarf eelgrass	Plantae	2025
	Nasua nasua Linnaeus, 1766	South American coati	Mammalia	2016
	Neogale vison (Schreber, 1777)	American mink	Mammalia	2027 (2025)
	Nyctereutes procyonoides Gray, 1834	Raccoon dog	Mammalia	2019 (2017)
	Obama nungara Carbayo, Álvarez-Presas, Jones & Riutort, 2016		Platyhelminthes	2025
	Ondatra zibethicus Linnaeus, 1766	Muskrat	Mammalia	2017
	Orconectes limosus Rafinesque, 1817	Spiny-cheek crayfish	Crustacea	2016
	Orconectes virilis Hagen, 1870	Virile (northern) crayfish	Crustacea	2016
	Oxyura jamaicensis Gmelin, 1789	Ruddy duck	Aves	2016
	Pacifastacus leniusculus Dana, 1852	Signal crayfish	Crustacea	2016
	Parthenium hysterophorus L.	Whitetop weed	Plantae	2016
	Pennisetum setaceum (Forssk.) Chiov.	Crimson fountaingrass	Plantae	2017
	Perccottus glenii Dybowski, 1877	Amur sleeper	Pisces	2016
	Persicaria perfoliata (L.) H. Gross	Asiatic tearthumb	Plantae	2016
	Pistia stratiotes	Water lettuce	Plantae	2024 (2022)
	Platydemus manokwari de Beauchamp, 1963	New Guinea flatworm	Platyhelminthes	2025
	Plotosus lineatus (Thunberg, 1787)	Striped eel catfish	Pisces	2019
	Procambarus clarkii Girard, 1852	Red swamp crayfish	Crustacea	2016
	Procambarus virginalis (Lyko, 2017)	Marbled crayfish	Crustacea	2016
	Procyon lotor Linnaeus, 1758	Raccoon	Mammalia	2016
	Prosopis juliflora (Sw.) DC.	Mesquite	Plantae	2019
	Pseudorasbora parva Temminck & Schlegel, 1846	Topmouth gudgeon	Pisces	2016
	Pueraria montana var. lobata (Willd.)	Kudzu vine	Plantae	2016
	Pycnonotus cafer	Red-vented bulbul	Aves	2022
	Pycnonotus jocosus (Linnaeus, 1758)	Red-whiskered bulbul	Aves	2025
	Reynoutria japonica Houtt.	Japanese knotweed	Plantae	2025
	Reynoutria sachalinensis (F. Schmidt) Nakai	Giant knotweed	Plantae	2025
	Reynoutria × bohemica Chrtek & Chrtková	Bohemian knotweed	Plantae	2025
	Rugulopteryx okamurae		Plantae	2022
	Salvinia molesta D.S. Mitch.	Giant salvinia, kariba weed	Plantae	2019
	Sciurus carolinensis Gmelin, 1788	Grey squirrel	Mammalia	2016
	Sciurus niger Linnaeus, 1758	Bryant's fox squirrel	Mammalia	2016
	Solenopsis geminata	Tropical fire ant	Insecta	2022
	Solenopsis invicta	Red imported fire ant	Insecta	2022
	Solenopsis richteri	Black imported fire ant	Insecta	2022
	Tamias sibiricus Laxmann, 1769	Siberian chipmunk	Mammalia	2016
	Threskiornis aethiopicus Latham, 1790	Sacred Ibis	Aves	2016
	Trachemys scripta elegans Schoepff, 1792	Red eared slider	Reptilia	2016
	Triadica sebifera (L.) Small	Chinese tallowtree	Plantae	2019
	Vespa mandarinia Smith, 1852	Asian giant hornet	Insecta	2025
	Vespa velutina nigrithorax du Buysson, 1905	Yellow-legged Asian hornet	Insecta	2016
	Wasmannia auropunctata	Electric ant	Insecta	2022
	Xenopus laevis	African clawed frog	Amphibia	2024 (2022)

== Resources ==
- Official IAS webpage
- An Introduction to the EU Regulation on Invasive Alien Species (Version 2022) (PDF). Overview of the project.
- An introduction to the invasive alien species of Union concern (Version 2022) (PDF). This brochure presents the currently listed invasive alien species of Union concern, offering brief, non-technical and informal summaries of each of the 88 species.
- Baseline Distribution of Invasive Alien Species of Union Concern

== See also ==
- List of invasive species in Europe (extensive list of alien species occurring in Europe)
