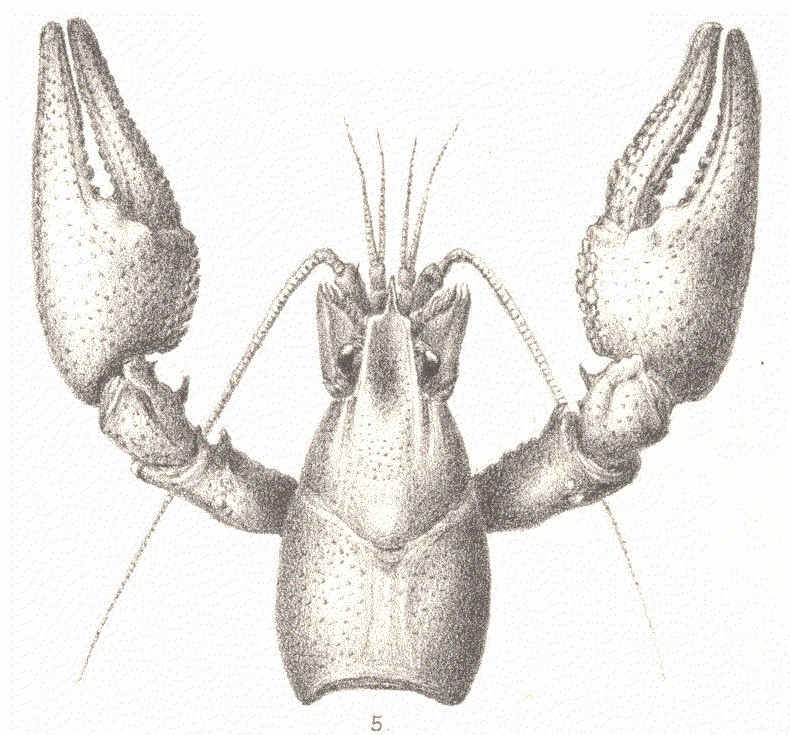

Conservation status
- Least Concern (IUCN 3.1)

- Vulnerable (NatureServe)

Scientific classification
- Kingdom: Animalia
- Phylum: Arthropoda
- Class: Malacostraca
- Order: Decapoda
- Suborder: Pleocyemata
- Family: Cambaridae
- Genus: Faxonius
- Species: F. sloanii

Binomial name
- Faxonius sloanii (Bundy in Forbes, 1876)

Synonyms
- Orconectes sloanii; Orconectes indianensis sloanii; Cambarus sloanii

= Faxonius sloanii =

Species of crayfish

Faxonius sloanii, the Sloan or Sloan's crayfish is a species of crayfish in the family Cambaridae, native to Indiana and Ohio. It is associated with freshwater habitats. Although it is being slowly out-competed by the rusty crayfish in Ohio, it is listed as a species of Least Concern on the IUCN Red List.
