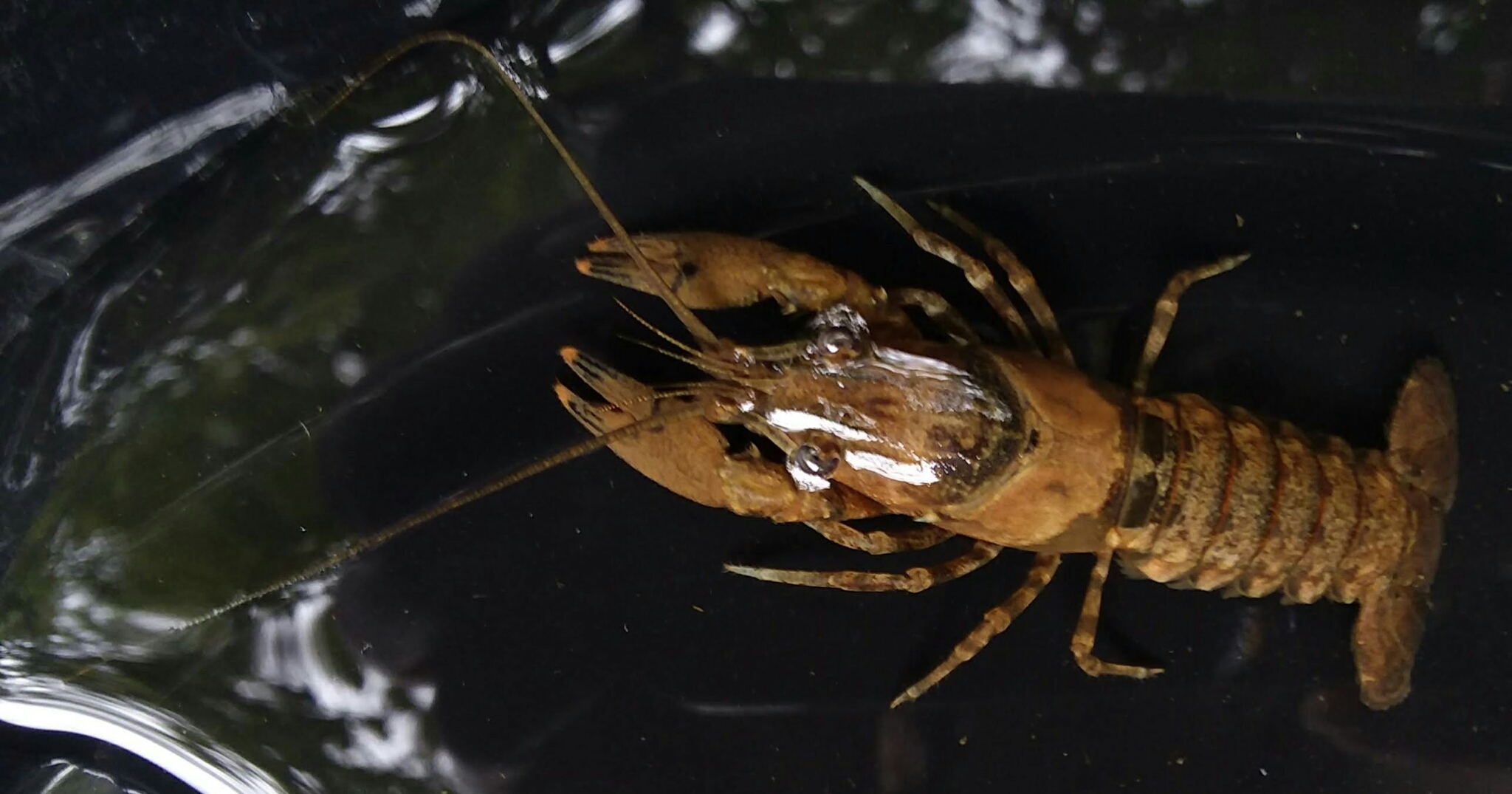
- Reticulate Crayfish, Tennessee

Conservation status
- Least Concern (IUCN 3.1)

- Secure (NatureServe)

Scientific classification
- Kingdom: Animalia
- Phylum: Arthropoda
- Class: Malacostraca
- Order: Decapoda
- Suborder: Pleocyemata
- Family: Cambaridae
- Genus: Faxonius
- Species: F. erichsonianus

Binomial name
- Faxonius erichsonianus (Faxon, 1898)

Synonyms
- Orconectes erichsonianus Faxon, 1898; Cambarus spinosus gulielmi Faxon, 1914

= Faxonius erichsonianus =

Reticulate crayfish

Species of crayfish

Faxonius erichsonianus is a species in the family Cambaridae ("crayfishes"), in the order Decapoda ("crabs, crayfishes, lobsters, prawns, and shrimp"). A common name for Faxonius erichsonianus is reticulate crayfish. Faxonius erichsonianus is found in the south eastern United States of America.

The IUCN conservation status of Faxonius erichsonianus is "LC", least concern, with no immediate threat to the species' survival.
