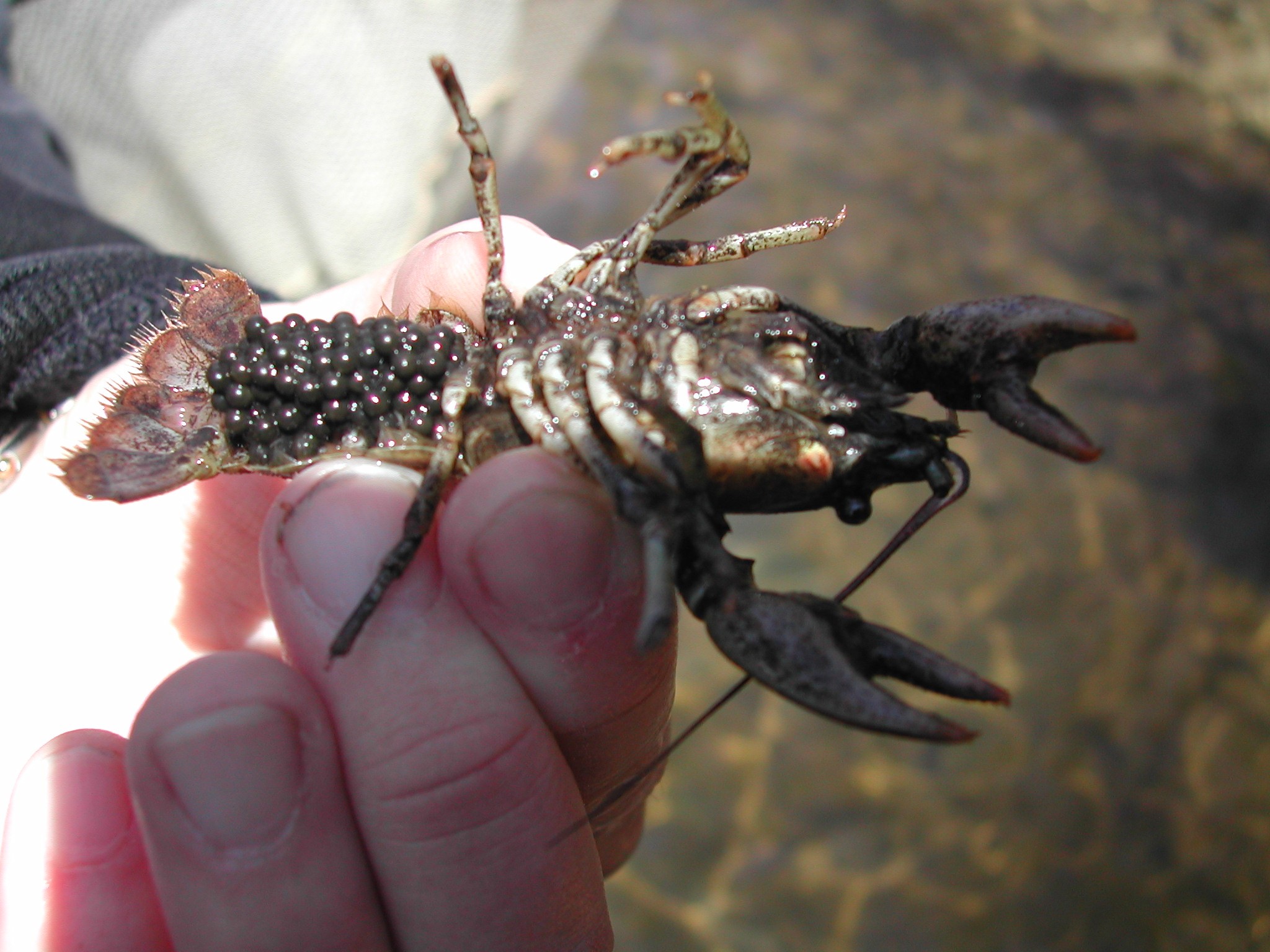
- Eggs on Faxonius obscurus

Conservation status
- Least Concern (IUCN 3.1)

- Secure (NatureServe)

Scientific classification
- Kingdom: Animalia
- Phylum: Arthropoda
- Class: Malacostraca
- Order: Decapoda
- Suborder: Pleocyemata
- Family: Cambaridae
- Genus: Faxonius
- Species: F. obscurus

Binomial name
- Faxonius obscurus (Hagen, 1870)

Synonyms
- Orconectes obscurus; Cambarus obscurus

= Faxonius obscurus =

Species of crayfish

Faxonius obscurus is a species of crayfish in the family Cambaridae. It is native to the northeastern United States, where it occurs in Maryland, New York, Ohio, Pennsylvania, Virginia, and West Virginia. It is an introduced species in adjacent regions, including Massachusetts, Vermont, and Ontario in Canada. It is known commonly as the Allegheny crayfish and the obscure crayfish.

This species lives in slow-moving waterways and pools with rocky substrates, where it hides beneath rocks. It also burrows into the substrate.

This species is common to abundant. It faces minor threats in some parts of its range. It has been displaced by the rusty crayfish, a related species that is more aggressive and outcompetes other crayfish in its habitat. Other threats include water pollution, especially from mine runoff.

It has become an introduced species itself in some areas, often when released from bait buckets.
