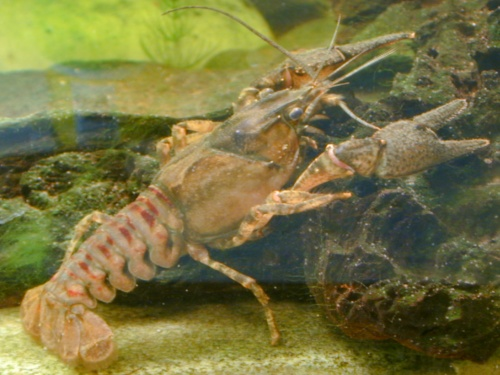
- Faxonius limosus

Scientific classification
- Kingdom: Animalia
- Phylum: Arthropoda
- Class: Malacostraca
- Order: Decapoda
- Suborder: Pleocyemata
- Family: Cambaridae
- Genus: Faxonius; Ortmann, 1905

Type species
- Faxonius limosus Rafinesque, 1817

= Faxonius =

Genus of crayfishes

Faxonius is a genus of freshwater crayfish in the family Cambaridae. There are more than 90 described species in Faxonius. It includes the rusty crayfish, an invasive species in North America, and three species, F. virilis, F. immunis, and F. limosus, that are invasive to Europe.

This genus was formerly considered a subgenus of Orconectes. Several former Orconectes species were added to this genus in 2017, leaving only the cave dwelling species unchanged.

== Species ==
These species belong to the genus Faxonius:

- Faxonius acares (Fitzpatrick, 1965)
- Faxonius alabamensis (Faxon, 1884)
- Faxonius alluvius (Simon & McMurray, 2014)
- Faxonius barrenensis (Rhoades, 1944)
- Faxonius bellator Bloom, McCall, Schuster & Blanton, 2019
- Faxonius bisectus (Rhoades, 1944)
- Faxonius burri (Taylor & Sabaj, 1998)
- Faxonius carolinensis (Cooper & Cooper, 1995)
- Faxonius castaneus (Johnson, 2010)
- Faxonius causeyi (Jester, 1967)
- Faxonius chickasawae (Cooper & Hobbs, 1980)
- Faxonius compressus (Faxon, 1884)
- Faxonius cooperi (Cooper & Hobbs, 1980)
- Faxonius cristavarius (Taylor, 2000)
- Faxonius cyanodigitus (Johnson, 2010)
- Faxonius deanae (Reimer & Jester, 1975)
- Faxonius difficilis (Faxon, 1898)
- Faxonius durelli (Bouchard & Bouchard, 1995)
- Faxonius elix Couch & Hayes, 2022
- Faxonius erichsonianus (Faxon, 1898)
- Faxonius etnieri (Bouchard & Bouchard, 1976)
- Faxonius eupunctus (Williams, 1952)
- Faxonius forceps (Faxon, 1884)
- Faxonius harrisonii (Faxon, 1884)
- Faxonius hartfieldi (Fitzpatrick & Suttkus, 1992)
- Faxonius hathawayi
  - Faxonius hathawayi blacki (Walls, 1972)
  - Faxonius hathawayi hathawayi (Penn, 1952)
- Faxonius hobbsi (Penn, 1950)
- Faxonius holti (Cooper & Hobbs, 1980)
- Faxonius hylas (Faxon, 1890)
- Faxonius illinoiensis (Brown, 1956)
- Faxonius immunis (Hagen, 1870)
- Faxonius indianensis (Hay, 1896)
- Faxonius jeffersoni (Rhoades, 1944)
- Faxonius jonesi (Fitzpatrick, 1992)
- Faxonius juvenilis (Hagen, 1870)
- Faxonius kentuckiensis (Rhoades, 1944)
- Faxonius lancifer (Hagen, 1870)
- Faxonius leptogonopodus (Hobbs, 1948)
- Faxonius limosus (Rafinesque, 1817)
- Faxonius longidigitus (Faxon, 1898)
- Faxonius luteus (Creaser, 1933)
- Faxonius macrus (Williams, 1952)
- Faxonius maletae (Walls, 1972)
- Faxonius marchandi (Hobbs, 1948)
- Faxonius margorectus (Taylor, 2002)
- Faxonius medius (Faxon, 1884)
- Faxonius meeki
  - Faxonius meeki brevis (Williams, 1952)
  - Faxonius meeki meeki (Faxon, 1898)
- Faxonius menae (Creaser, 1933)
- Faxonius mirus (Ortmann, 1931)
- Faxonius mississippiensis (Faxon, 1884)
- Faxonius nais (Faxon, 1885)
- Faxonius nana (Williams, 1952)
- Faxonius neglectus
  - Faxonius neglectus chaenodactylus (Williams, 1952)
  - Faxonius neglectus neglectus (Faxon, 1885)
- Faxonius obscurus (Hagen, 1870)
- Faxonius occidentalis (Johnson, 2010)
- Faxonius ozarkae (Williams, 1952)
- Faxonius pagei (Taylor & Sabaj, 1997)
- Faxonius palmeri
  - Faxonius palmeri creolanus (Creaser, 1933)
  - Faxonius palmeri longimanus (Faxon, 1898)
  - Faxonius palmeri palmeri (Faxon, 1884)
- Faxonius pardalotus (Wetzel, Poly & Fetzner, 2005)
- Faxonius perfectus (Walls, 1972)
- Faxonius peruncus (Creaser, 1931)
- Faxonius placidus (Hagen, 1870)
- Faxonius propinquus (Girard, 1852)
- Faxonius punctimanus (Creaser, 1933)
- Faxonius putnami (Faxon, 1884)
- Faxonius quadruncus (Creaser, 1933)
- Faxonius quinebaugensis (Mathews & Warren, 2008)
- Faxonius rafinesquei (Rhoades, 1944)
- Faxonius raymondi (Thoma & Stocker, 2009)
- Faxonius rhoadesi (Hobbs, 1949)
- Faxonius ronaldi (Taylor, 2000)
- Faxonius roberti Fetzner & Taylor, 2018
- Faxonius rusticus (Girard, 1852)
- Faxonius sanbornii
  - Faxonius sanbornii erismophorous (Hobbs & Fitzpatrick, 1962)
  - Faxonius sanbornii sanbornii (Faxon, 1884)
- Faxonius saxatilis (Bouchard & Bouchard, 1976)
- Faxonius shoupi (Hobbs, 1948)
- Faxonius sloanii (Bundy in Forbes, 1876)
- Faxonius spinosus (Bundy, 1877)
- Faxonius stannardi (Page, 1985)
- Faxonius taylori (Schuster, 2008)
- Faxonius texanus (Johnson, 2010)
- Faxonius theaphionensis (Simon, Timm & Morris, 2005)
- Faxonius transfuga (Fitzpatrick, 1966)
- Faxonius tricuspis (Rhoades, 1944)
- Faxonius validus (Faxon, 1914)
- Faxonius virginiensis (Hobbs, 1951)
- Faxonius virilis (Hagen, 1870)
- Faxonius wagneri (Fetzner & Taylor, 2018)
- Faxonius williamsi (Fitzpatrick, 1966)
- Faxonius wrighti (Hobbs, 1948)
- Faxonius yanahlindus (Taylor, Rhoden & Schuster, 2016)

== See also ==
- Faxonella, a genus of crayfish
