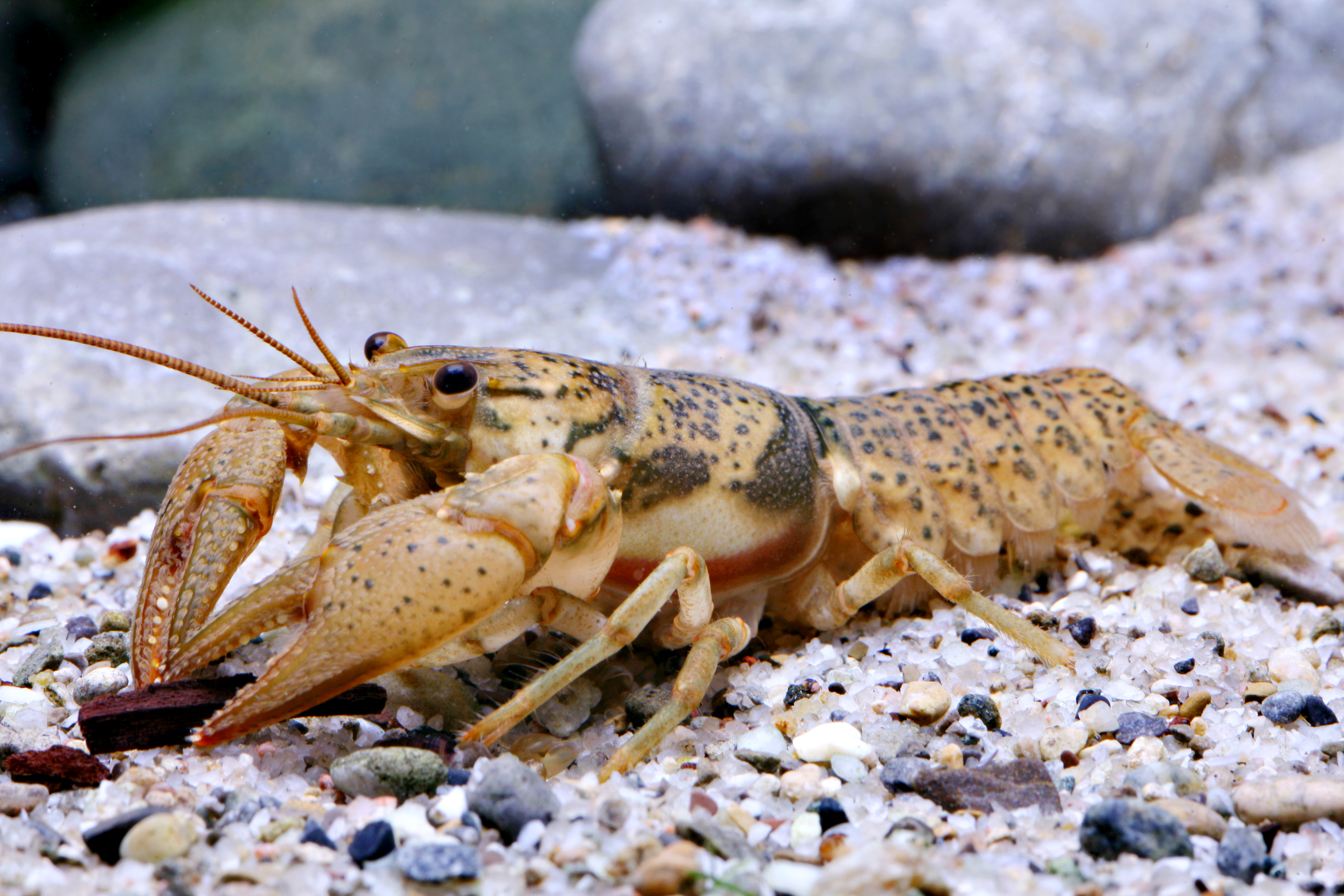

Conservation status
- Vulnerable (IUCN 3.1)

- Critically Imperiled (NatureServe)

Scientific classification
- Kingdom: Animalia
- Phylum: Arthropoda
- Clade: Pancrustacea
- Class: Malacostraca
- Order: Decapoda
- Suborder: Pleocyemata
- Family: Cambaridae
- Genus: Faxonius
- Species: F. peruncus

Binomial name
- Faxonius peruncus (Creaser, 1931)

Synonyms
- Orconectes peruncus

= Faxonius peruncus =

Species of crayfish

Faxonius peruncus, the Big Creek crayfish, is a species of crayfish in the family Cambaridae. It is endemic to Missouri. The common name refers to Big Creek, where the original specimens were found.

== Distribution ==
F. peruncus is limited to the St. Francis River watershed.

== Threats ==
The main threat to this species is a related species, F. hylas which was introduced into the area in 1984. F. hylas out-competes, and hybridises with, F. peruncus. Also, pollution from the Southeast Missouri Lead District affects the water quality in the local area.
