= Faxonius saxatilis =

Conservation status
- Vulnerable (IUCN 3.1)

- Imperiled (NatureServe)

Scientific classification
- Kingdom: Animalia
- Phylum: Arthropoda
- Class: Malacostraca
- Order: Decapoda
- Suborder: Pleocyemata
- Family: Cambaridae
- Genus: Faxonius
- Species: F. saxatilis

Binomial name
- Faxonius saxatilis Bouchard & Bouchard, 1976

Synonyms
- Orconectes saxatilis

Species of crayfish

Faxonius saxatilis is a species of crayfish in the family Cambaridae. It is endemic to tributaries of the Kiamichi River, Le Flore County, Oklahoma. Its common name is Kiamichi crayfish.
