= Faxonius marchandi =

Conservation status
- Near Threatened (IUCN 3.1)

- Imperiled (NatureServe)

Scientific classification
- Kingdom: Animalia
- Phylum: Arthropoda
- Class: Malacostraca
- Order: Decapoda
- Suborder: Pleocyemata
- Family: Cambaridae
- Genus: Faxonius
- Species: F. marchandi

Binomial name
- Faxonius marchandi (Hobbs, 1948)

Synonyms
- Orconectes marchandi

Species of crayfish

Faxonius marchandi, the Mammoth Spring crayfish, is a species of crayfish in the family Cambaridae. It is endemic to Missouri and Arkansas in the United States.
