= Faxonius sanbornii erismophorous =

Scientific classification
- Domain: Eukaryota
- Kingdom: Animalia
- Phylum: Arthropoda
- Class: Malacostraca
- Order: Decapoda
- Suborder: Pleocyemata
- Family: Cambaridae
- Genus: Faxonius
- Species: F. sanbornii
- Subspecies: F. s. erismophorous

Trinomial name
- Faxonius sanbornii erismophorous (Hobbs & Fitzpatrick, 1962)

Synonyms
- Orconectes propinquus erismophorous

Subspecies of crayfish

Faxonius sanbornii erismophorous is a sub-species of crayfish in the family Cambaridae. It is endemic to the United States.
