= Faxonius nais =

Conservation status
- Secure (NatureServe)

Scientific classification
- Kingdom: Animalia
- Phylum: Arthropoda
- Clade: Pancrustacea
- Class: Malacostraca
- Order: Decapoda
- Suborder: Pleocyemata
- Family: Cambaridae
- Genus: Faxonius
- Species: F. nais

Binomial name
- Faxonius nais (Faxon, 1885)

Synonyms
- Cambarus nais Faxon, 1885; Orconectes nais (Faxon, 1885); Cambarus pilosus Hay, 1899

Species of crayfish

Faxonius nais is a species of crayfish often referred to as the water nymph crayfish.

== Description ==
Adult Faxonius nais often get to 5 in (130 mm) or longer. It is typically lacking in distinct markings and its chelae are typically blue or green with orange tips.

== Range ==
Faxonius nais is typically found in the Great Plains and the Ozarks of the United States. Its range has not yet been fully described and it has been known to be found in Arkansas, Colorado, Kansas, Missouri, Nebraska, Oklahoma, and Texas.

== Habitat ==
They can be found in freshwater streams and ponds in the central United States. They are largely considered tertiary burrowers, meaning they only burrow under harsh conditions, like during a drought or freeze.
