= Faxonius menae =

Conservation status
- Least Concern (IUCN 3.1)

- Vulnerable (NatureServe)

Scientific classification
- Kingdom: Animalia
- Phylum: Arthropoda
- Class: Malacostraca
- Order: Decapoda
- Suborder: Pleocyemata
- Family: Cambaridae
- Genus: Faxonius
- Species: F. menae

Binomial name
- Faxonius menae (Creaser, 1933)

Synonyms
- Orconectes menae

Species of crayfish

Faxonius menae, the Mena crayfish, is a species of crayfish in the family Cambaridae. It is endemic to Oklahoma and Arkansas in the United States. The specific epithet and common name both refer to Mena, Arkansas, where the original specimens were found.
