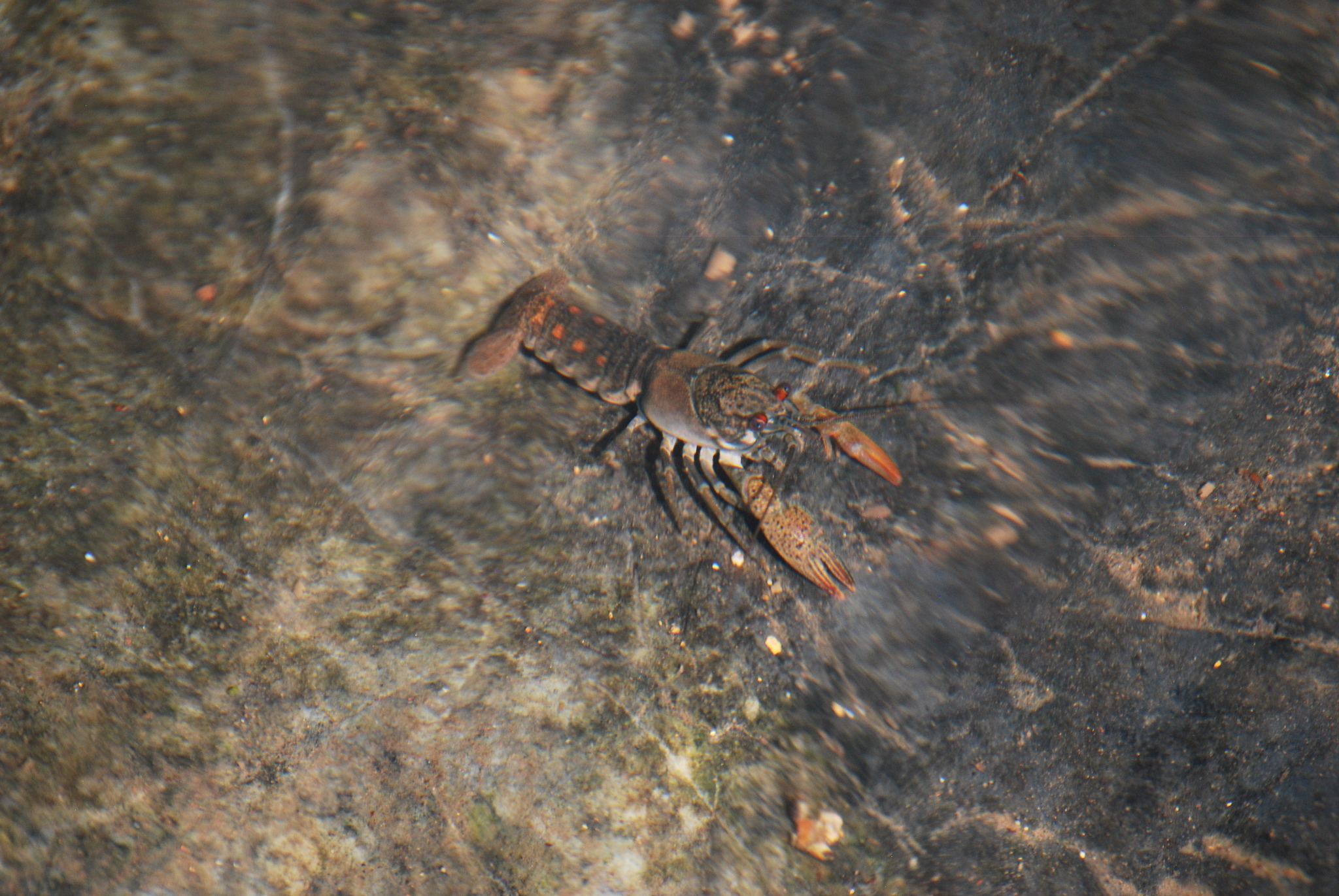

Conservation status
- Least Concern (IUCN 3.1)

- Apparently Secure (NatureServe)

Scientific classification
- Kingdom: Animalia
- Phylum: Arthropoda
- Class: Malacostraca
- Order: Decapoda
- Suborder: Pleocyemata
- Family: Cambaridae
- Genus: Faxonius
- Species: F. acares

Binomial name
- Faxonius acares (Fitzpatrick, 1965)

Synonyms
- Orconectes acares

= Faxonius acares =

Species of crayfish

Faxonius acares, or the redspotted stream crayfish, is a species of freshwater crayfish endemic to the Arkansas River and the Ouachita River of the Ouachita National Forest and Ouachita Mountains, Arkansas.

== Description ==
The main body color of F. acares is a slate gray. The chelae are also a slate gray, fading into an off-white towards the undersides. The telson and uropods take on a brownish color. Distinctive paired bright red spots appear on individual tergal segments, and a red bar runs across the sixth tergal segment, or the segment closest to the tail fan. The cheeks and lower edge of the gill are covered in pinkish streaks. Adult F. acares crayfish will range from 25–76 mm (1–3 in) in length.
