= Faxonius kentuckiensis =

Conservation status
- Least Concern (IUCN 3.1)

- Apparently Secure (NatureServe)

Scientific classification
- Kingdom: Animalia
- Phylum: Arthropoda
- Class: Malacostraca
- Order: Decapoda
- Suborder: Pleocyemata
- Family: Cambaridae
- Genus: Faxonius
- Species: F. kentuckiensis

Binomial name
- Faxonius kentuckiensis (Rhoades, 1944)

Synonyms
- Orconectes kentuckiensis

Species of crayfish

Faxonius kentuckiensis, the Kentucky crayfish, is a species of crayfish in the family Cambaridae. It is endemic to Kentucky and Illinois in the United States.
