= Faxonius alluvius =

Scientific classification
- Kingdom: Animalia
- Phylum: Arthropoda
- Class: Malacostraca
- Order: Decapoda
- Suborder: Pleocyemata
- Family: Cambaridae
- Genus: Faxonius
- Species: F. alluvius

Binomial name
- Faxonius alluvius (Simon and McMurray, 2014)

Synonyms
- Orconectes alluvius

Species of crustacean

Faxonius alluvius is a species of Cambarid crayfish endemic to the state of Indiana.

== Description ==
The exoskeleton of Faxonius alluvius generally ranges in light brown with occasional areas of darker brown or light olive green. A large, mottled dark brown patch is located on the head, anterior to the areola. Dorsal surfaces of the abdominal segments are colored with wide, mottled, dark-brown markings occupying about half of the width of the abdomen, gradually becoming narrower distally until only represented by a small triangle by the end of the abdomen. Lateral areas of the abdomen are light brown with darker brown markings along the edges. The claws are overall colored a light brown. The fingers of the claws bear orange tips, followed proximally by wide black bands.

== Range ==
Faxonius alluvius is confined to streams within the Crawford Upland and Mitchell Karst Plain of southwestern Indiana.

== Habitat ==
Faxonius alluvius is a freshwater-dwelling species that occurs in small to medium-sized sandy streams associated with leaf litter and woody debris.

== Ecology ==
Female Faxonius alluvius are observed carrying young during the winter and spring months. On average, females will carry 170 to 230 of their young at one time. This species' population appears to be composed predominantly of males, with a 1.5:1 male-to-female sex ratio. Juveniles are often found during the early summer months in small flowing streams and ditches associated with slower water velocities, leaf packs, and woody debris.

== Taxonomy ==
At time of discovery, Faxonius alluvius was accepted under the title Orconectes alluvius before it was revised into the Faxonius genus.
