= Faxonius texanus =

Scientific classification
- Kingdom: Animalia
- Phylum: Arthropoda
- Class: Malacostraca
- Order: Decapoda
- Suborder: Pleocyemata
- Family: Cambaridae
- Genus: Faxonius
- Species: F. texanus

Binomial name
- Faxonius texanus (Johnson, 2010)

Synonyms
- Orconectes texanus

Species of crayfish

Faxonius texanus, or the Texas river crayfish, is a species of cambarid crayfish endemic to the East Texas area.
