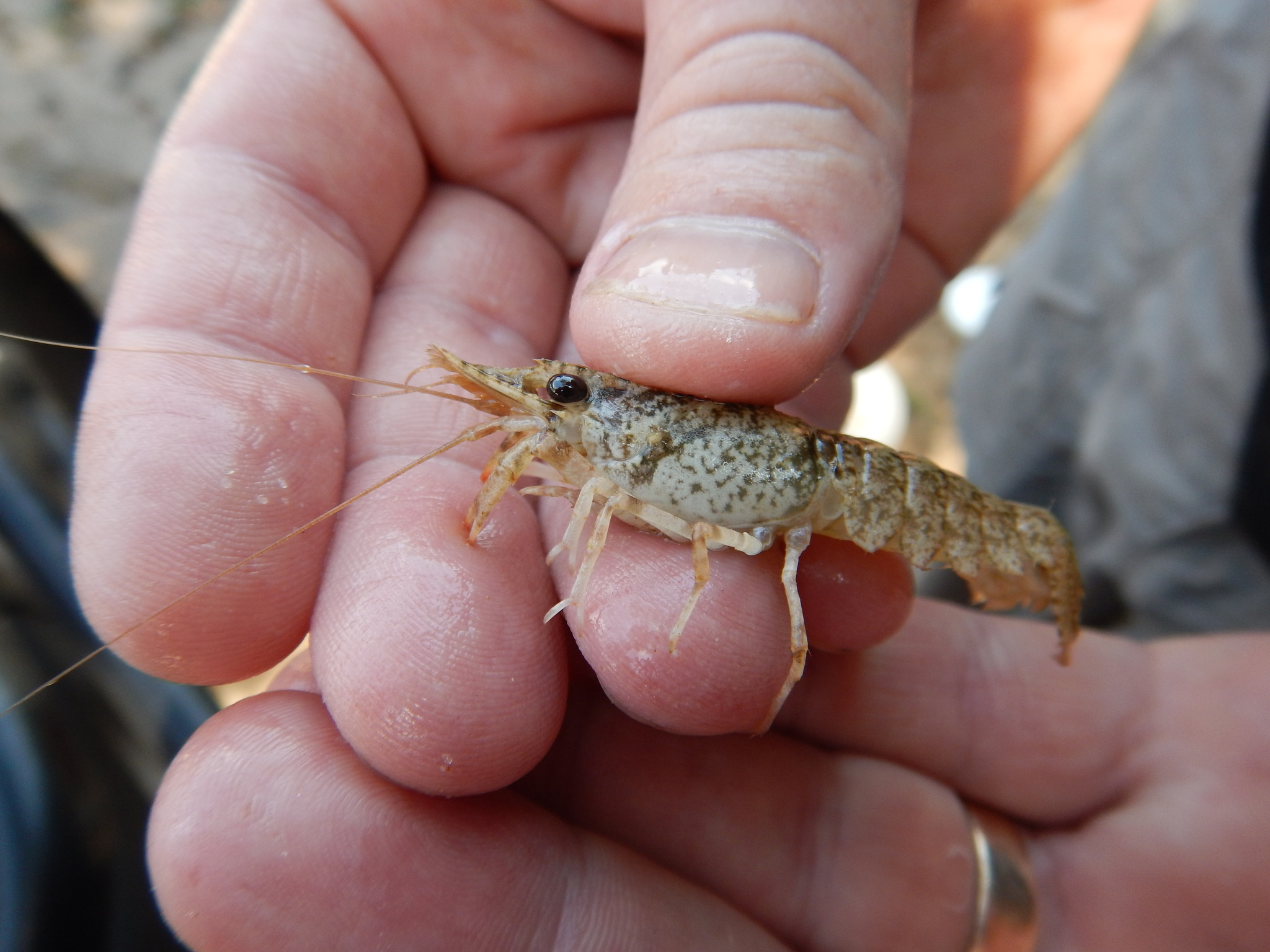
- Faxonius lancifer Shrimp Crayfish

Conservation status
- Least Concern (IUCN 3.1)

- Secure (NatureServe)

Scientific classification
- Kingdom: Animalia
- Phylum: Arthropoda
- Clade: Pancrustacea
- Class: Malacostraca
- Order: Decapoda
- Suborder: Pleocyemata
- Family: Cambaridae
- Genus: Faxonius
- Species: F. lancifer

Binomial name
- Faxonius lancifer (Hagen, 1870)

Synonyms
- Cambarus lancifer; Orconectes lancifer

= Faxonius lancifer =

Species of crayfish

Faxonius lancifer, the shrimp crayfish, is a species of crayfish in the family Cambaridae. It is widespread in the South-Eastern United States.

== Description ==
Faxonius lancifer is a small crayfish. The adults range in size from about 2 to 3 in (5.1 to 7.6 cm).

== Distribution and habitat ==
The original specimens came from Tallahatchie River at Rocky Ford, near the town of Etta, Union County, Mississippi. It is generally found in deep, slow rivers, large streams or lakes throughout its range.
