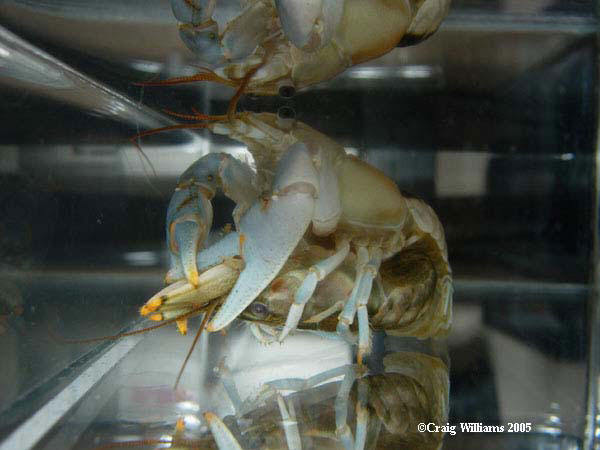

Conservation status
- Least Concern (IUCN 3.1)

- Secure (NatureServe)

Scientific classification
- Kingdom: Animalia
- Phylum: Arthropoda
- Clade: Pancrustacea
- Class: Malacostraca
- Order: Decapoda
- Suborder: Pleocyemata
- Family: Cambaridae
- Genus: Faxonius
- Species: F. propinquus

Binomial name
- Faxonius propinquus (Girard, 1852)

Synonyms
- Orconectes propinquus

= Faxonius propinquus =

Species of crayfish

Faxonius propinquus, the Northern clearwater crayfish, is a species of crayfish in the family Cambaridae found in Ontario, Quebec and the Northeastern and Midwestern United States. Northern Clearwater Crayfish have one pair of robust claws and are dark reddish brown. Behind the claws they have 8 walking legs. They have a dark band or stripe that runs along the midline of their carapace (shell). They are omnivorous.
