= Faxonius stannardi =

Conservation status
- Least Concern (IUCN 3.1)

- Imperiled (NatureServe)

Scientific classification
- Domain: Eukaryota
- Kingdom: Animalia
- Phylum: Arthropoda
- Class: Malacostraca
- Order: Decapoda
- Suborder: Pleocyemata
- Family: Cambaridae
- Genus: Faxonius
- Species: F. stannardi

Binomial name
- Faxonius stannardi (Page, 1985)

Synonyms
- Orconectes stannardi

Species of crayfish

Faxonius stannardi, the Little Wabash crayfish, is a species of crayfish in the family Cambaridae. It is endemic to Illinois. The common name refers to the Little Wabash River, where the original specimens were found.
