= Faxonius jeffersoni =

Conservation status
- Endangered (IUCN 3.1)

- Critically Imperiled (NatureServe)

Scientific classification
- Kingdom: Animalia
- Phylum: Arthropoda
- Class: Malacostraca
- Order: Decapoda
- Suborder: Pleocyemata
- Family: Cambaridae
- Genus: Faxonius
- Species: F. jeffersoni

Binomial name
- Faxonius jeffersoni (Rhoades, 1944)

Synonyms
- Orconectes jeffersoni

Species of crayfish

Faxonius jeffersoni, the Louisville crayfish, is a species of crayfish in the family Cambaridae. It is endemic to Kentucky.
