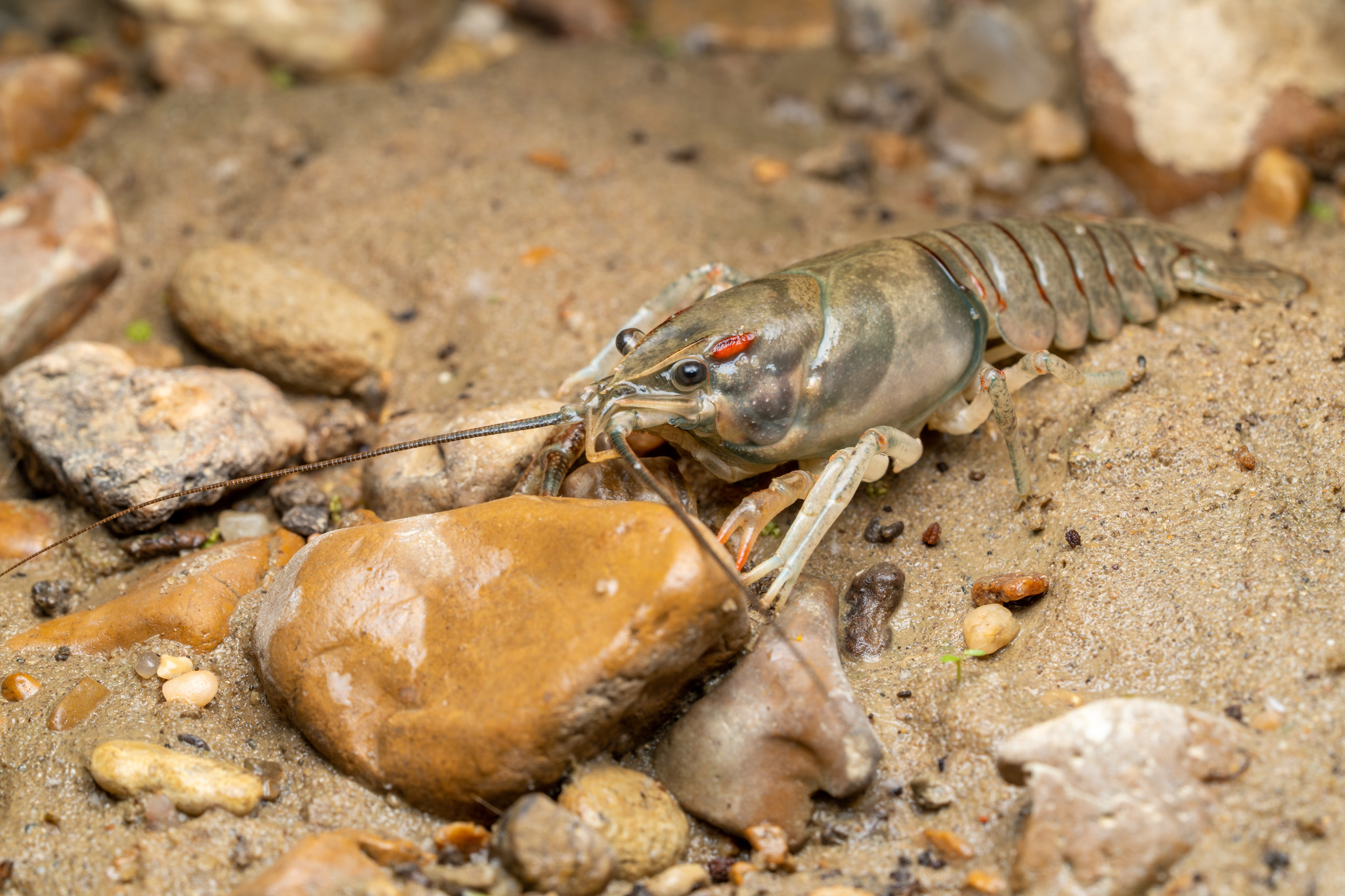

Conservation status
- Vulnerable (IUCN 3.1)

- Imperiled (NatureServe)

Scientific classification
- Kingdom: Animalia
- Phylum: Arthropoda
- Class: Malacostraca
- Order: Decapoda
- Suborder: Pleocyemata
- Family: Cambaridae
- Genus: Faxonius
- Species: F. hartfieldi

Binomial name
- Faxonius hartfieldi (Fitzpatrick & Suttkus, 1992)

Synonyms
- Orconectes hartfieldi Fitzpatrick & Suttkus, 1992

= Faxonius hartfieldi =

Species of crayfish

Faxonius hartfieldi, the Yazoo crayfish, is a species of crayfish in the family Cambaridae. It is endemic to Mississippi in the United States.
