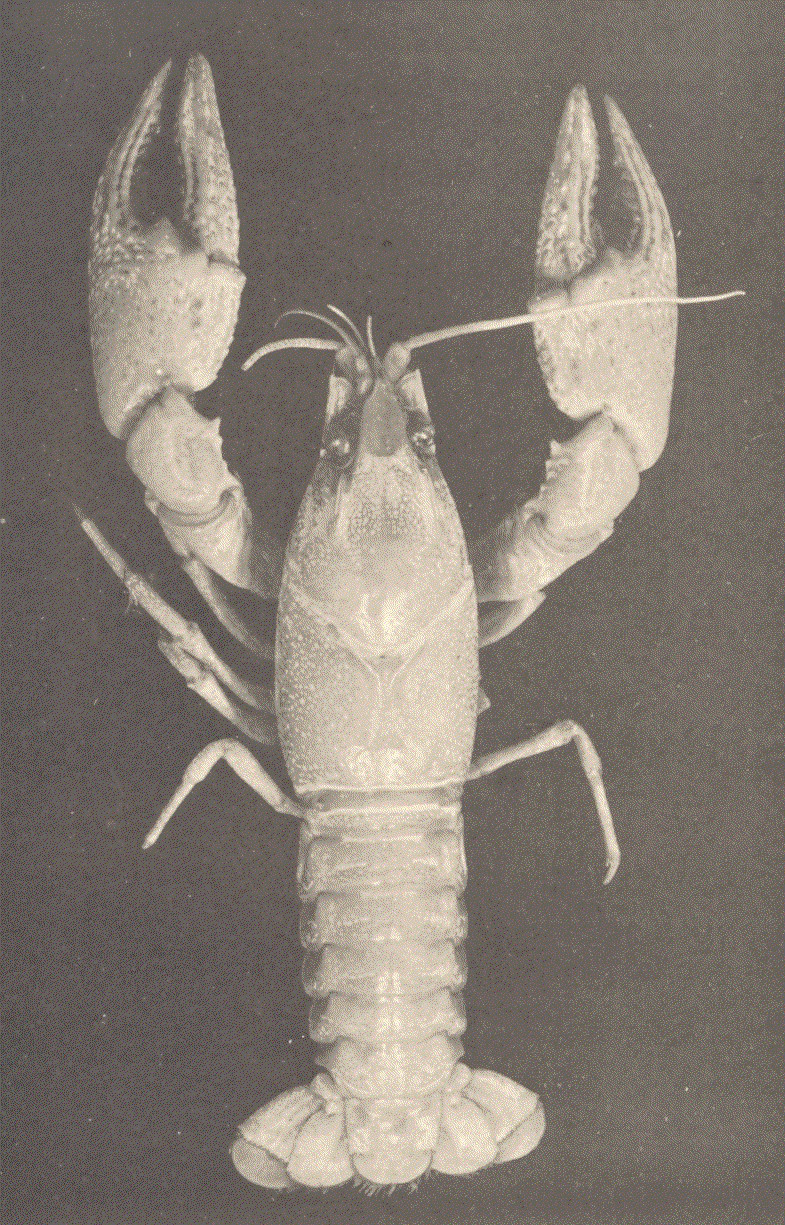

Conservation status
- Least Concern (IUCN 3.1)

- Secure (NatureServe)

Scientific classification
- Kingdom: Animalia
- Phylum: Arthropoda
- Class: Malacostraca
- Order: Decapoda
- Suborder: Pleocyemata
- Family: Cambaridae
- Genus: Faxonius
- Species: F. validus

Binomial name
- Faxonius validus (Faxon, 1914)

Synonyms
- Orconectes validus

= Faxonius validus =

Species of crayfish

Faxonius validus, the powerful crayfish, is a species of crayfish in the family Cambaridae. It is found in North America.

The IUCN conservation status of Faxonius validus is "LC", least concern, with no immediate threat to the species' survival. This status was last reviewed in 2010.
