= Faxonius holti =

Conservation status
- Data Deficient (IUCN 3.1)

- Vulnerable (NatureServe)

Scientific classification
- Kingdom: Animalia
- Phylum: Arthropoda
- Class: Malacostraca
- Order: Decapoda
- Suborder: Pleocyemata
- Family: Cambaridae
- Genus: Faxonius
- Species: F. holti

Binomial name
- Faxonius holti Cooper & Hobbs, 1980

Synonyms
- Orconectes holti

Species of crayfish

Faxonius holti, the bimaculate crayfish, is a species of crayfish in the family Cambaridae. It is endemic to Alabama where it occurs in a limited portion of the lower Tombigbee and central Alabama drainages.
