= Faxonius wrighti =

Conservation status
- Vulnerable (IUCN 3.1)

- Imperiled (NatureServe)

Scientific classification
- Kingdom: Animalia
- Phylum: Arthropoda
- Class: Malacostraca
- Order: Decapoda
- Suborder: Pleocyemata
- Family: Cambaridae
- Genus: Faxonius
- Species: F. wrighti

Binomial name
- Faxonius wrighti (Hobbs, 1948)

Synonyms
- Orconectes wrighti

Species of crayfish

Faxonius wrighti, the Hardin crayfish, is a species of crayfish in the family Cambaridae. It is endemic to the United States. The common name refers to Hardin County, Tennessee, where the original specimens were found.
