= Faxonius cooperi =

Conservation status
- Least Concern (IUCN 3.1)

- Critically Imperiled (NatureServe)

Scientific classification
- Kingdom: Animalia
- Phylum: Arthropoda
- Class: Malacostraca
- Order: Decapoda
- Suborder: Pleocyemata
- Family: Cambaridae
- Genus: Faxonius
- Species: F. cooperi

Binomial name
- Faxonius cooperi (M.R. Cooper & Hobbs, 1980)

Synonyms
- Orconectes cooperi M.R. Cooper and Hobbs, 1980

Species of crayfish

Faxonius cooperi, the Flint River crayfish, is a species of crayfish in the family Cambaridae. It is endemic to Alabama and Tennessee in the United States. The common name refers to the Flint River, where the original specimens were found.
