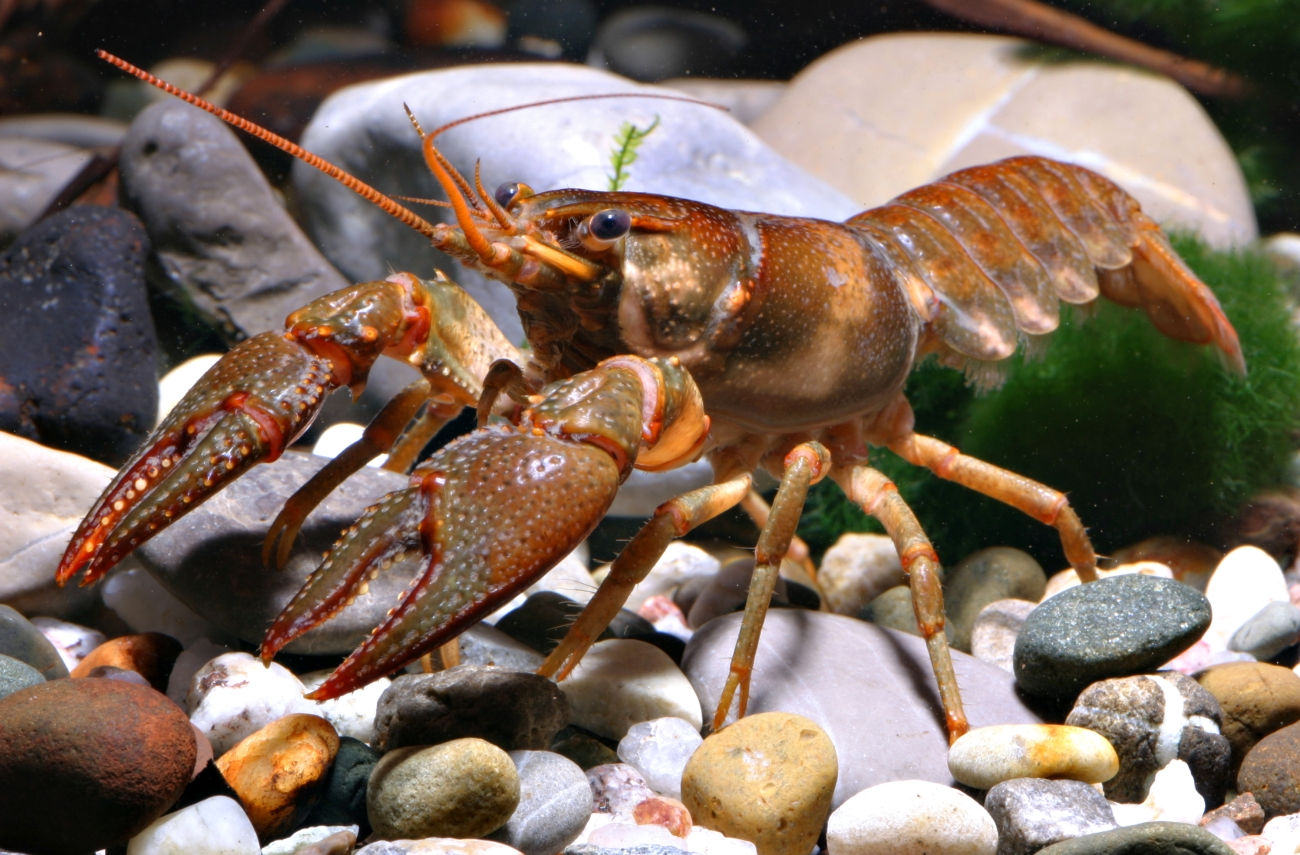

Conservation status
- Vulnerable (IUCN 3.1)

- Critically Imperiled (NatureServe)

Scientific classification
- Kingdom: Animalia
- Phylum: Arthropoda
- Class: Malacostraca
- Order: Decapoda
- Suborder: Pleocyemata
- Family: Cambaridae
- Genus: Faxonius
- Species: F. quadruncus

Binomial name
- Faxonius quadruncus (Creaser, 1933)

Synonyms
- Orconectes quadruncus

= Faxonius quadruncus =

Species of crayfish

Faxonius quadruncus, the St. Francis River crayfish, is a species of crayfish in the family Cambaridae. It is endemic to Missouri. The common name refers to the St. Francis River where the first examples were found.
