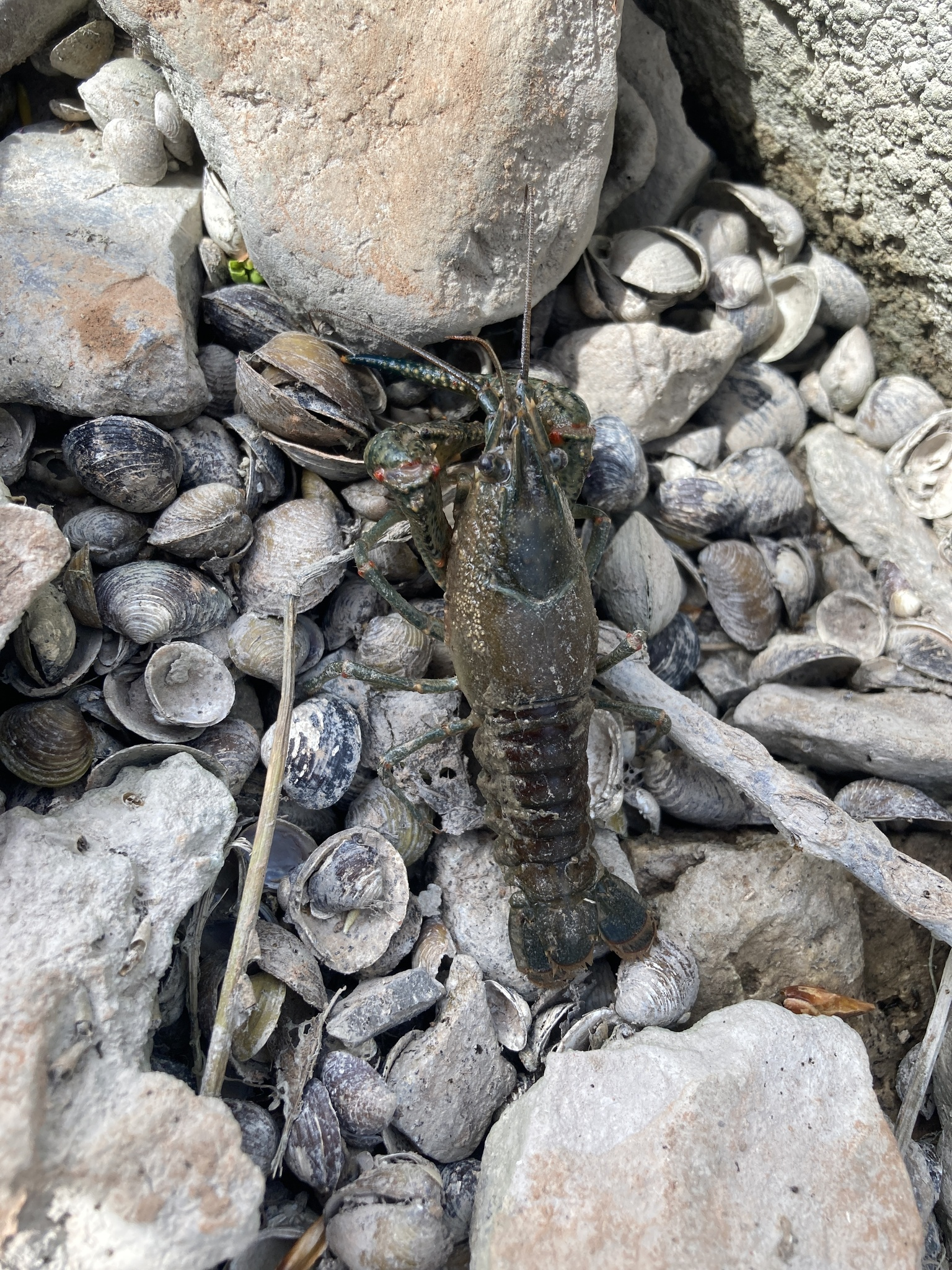

Conservation status
- Least Concern (IUCN 3.1)

- Apparently Secure (NatureServe)

Scientific classification
- Kingdom: Animalia
- Phylum: Arthropoda
- Class: Malacostraca
- Order: Decapoda
- Suborder: Pleocyemata
- Family: Cambaridae
- Genus: Faxonius
- Species: F. deanae

Binomial name
- Faxonius deanae (Reimer & Jester, 1975)

Synonyms
- Orconectes deanae

= Faxonius deanae =

Species of crayfish

Faxonius deanae, the Conchas crayfish is a species of crayfish in the family Cambaridae. It is endemic to the United States. The common name refers to the Conchas Lake, where the original specimens were found.
