= Faxonius jonesi =

Conservation status
- Data Deficient (IUCN 3.1)

- Vulnerable (NatureServe)

Scientific classification
- Kingdom: Animalia
- Phylum: Arthropoda
- Class: Malacostraca
- Order: Decapoda
- Suborder: Pleocyemata
- Family: Cambaridae
- Genus: Faxonius
- Species: F. jonesi

Binomial name
- Faxonius jonesi (Fitzpatrick, 1992)

Synonyms
- Orconetes jonesi

Species of crayfish

Faxonius jonesi, the Sucarnoochee River crayfish, is a species of crayfish in the family Cambaridae. The common name refers to the Sucarnoochee River, near where the original specimens were found in Kemper County, Mississippi. It is endemic to Mississippi and Alabama in the United States.
