= Faxonella creaseri =

Ouachita Fencing Crayfish

Conservation status
- Near Threatened (IUCN 3.1)

Scientific classification
- Kingdom: Animalia
- Phylum: Arthropoda
- Clade: Pancrustacea
- Class: Malacostraca
- Order: Decapoda
- Suborder: Pleocyemata
- Family: Cambaridae
- Genus: Faxonella
- Species: F. creaseri

Binomial name
- Faxonella creaseri (Walls, 1968)

Species of crayfish

Faxonella creaseri is a species of crayfish, a decapod crustacean in the family Cambaridae. It is one of the four species in the genus Faxonella.

The species is found in the northern lakes and rivers in North America.

It is documented that the species is found in Louisiana.

== Taxonomic classification ==
A modern update of the systemic classification was given by Fetzner et al.: (2005).

- Order Decapoda - 2700 families, 15,000 species Latreille, 1802
  - Suborder Reptantia
    - Infraorder Astacidea, crayfish and lobsters
      - Superfamily crayfish Astacoidea Latreille, 1802
        - Family Cambaridae Hobbs, 1942
          - Sub-family Cambarinae Hobbs, 1942
          - Genus Faxonella Creaser, 1933
            - Faxonella beyeri (Penn, 1950) - North America
            - Faxonella blairi Hayes and Reimer, 1977 - North America
            - Faxonella clypeata (Hay, 1899) - North America
            - Faxonella creaseri Walls, 1968 - North America
