= Faxonius bisectus =

Conservation status
- Vulnerable (IUCN 3.1)

- Critically Imperiled (NatureServe)

Scientific classification
- Kingdom: Animalia
- Phylum: Arthropoda
- Class: Malacostraca
- Order: Decapoda
- Suborder: Pleocyemata
- Family: Cambaridae
- Genus: Faxonius
- Species: F. bisectus

Binomial name
- Faxonius bisectus (Rhoades, 1944)

Synonyms
- Orconectes bisectus

Species of crayfish

Faxonius bisectus, the Crittenden Crayfish is a species of crayfish in the family Cambaridae. It is endemic to Kentucky.
