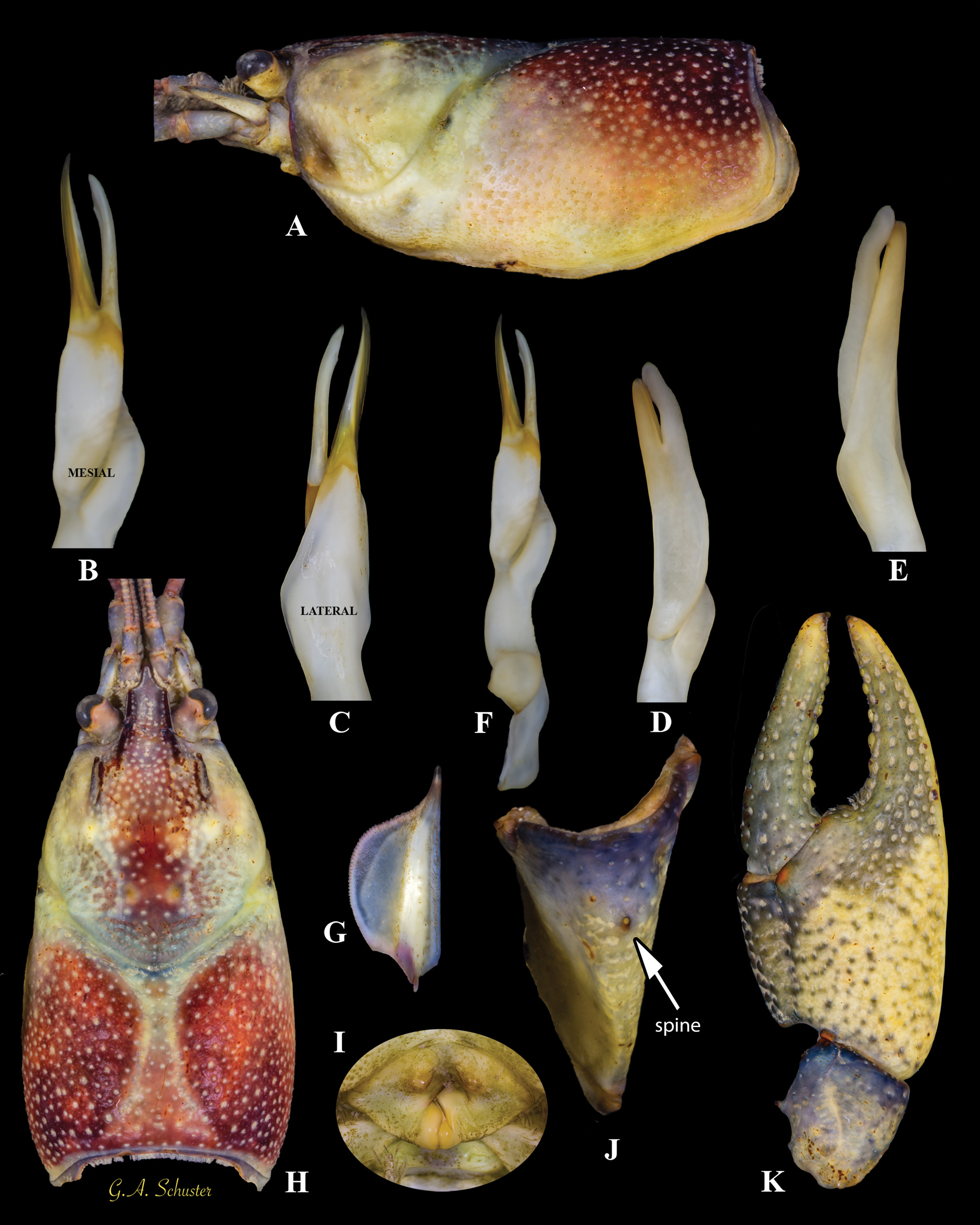

Conservation status
- Vulnerable (IUCN 3.1)

- Critically Imperiled (NatureServe)

Scientific classification
- Kingdom: Animalia
- Phylum: Arthropoda
- Class: Malacostraca
- Order: Decapoda
- Suborder: Pleocyemata
- Family: Cambaridae
- Genus: Faxonius
- Species: F. eupunctus

Binomial name
- Faxonius eupunctus (Williams, 1952)

Synonyms
- Orconectes eupunctus

= Faxonius eupunctus =

Species of crayfish

Faxonius eupunctus, the coldwater crayfish, is a vulnerable species of crayfish found in Missouri and Arkansas.
