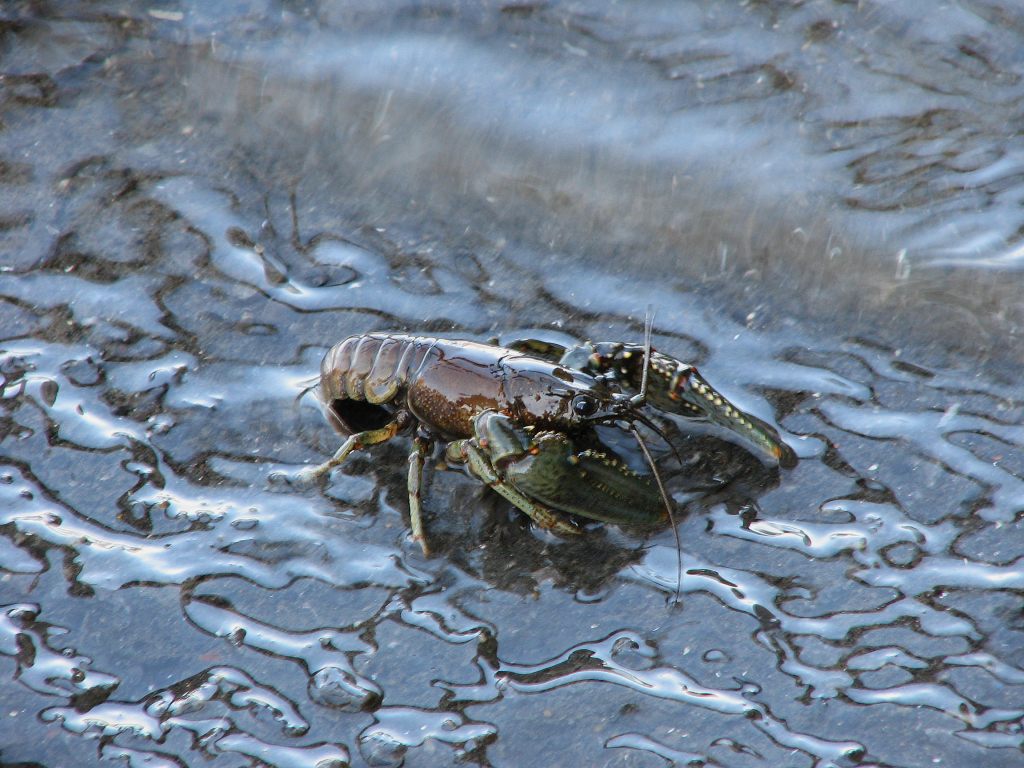

Conservation status
- Least Concern (IUCN 3.1)

- Secure (NatureServe)

Scientific classification
- Kingdom: Animalia
- Phylum: Arthropoda
- Class: Malacostraca
- Order: Decapoda
- Suborder: Pleocyemata
- Family: Cambaridae
- Genus: Faxonius
- Species: F. virilis

Binomial name
- Faxonius virilis (Hagen, 1870)

Synonyms
- Cambarus virilis Hagen, 1870; Cambarus wisconsinensis Bundy in Forbes, 1876; Cambarus debilis Bundy in Forbes, 1876; Cambarus couesi Streets, 1877

= Faxonius virilis =

Species of crayfish

Faxonius virilis is a species of crayfish known as the virile crayfish, northern crayfish, eastern crayfish, and lesser known as the lake crayfish or common crawfish. Faxonius virilis was reclassified in August 2017, and the genus was changed from Orconectes to Faxonius. It is native to the central United States, east to tributaries of Lake Erie, Lake Ontario, Lake Champlain and the St. Lawrence River in New York and to much of Canada.

== Ecology ==
Faxonius virilis can be found under stones and logs in lakes, streams, and wetlands, where they hide from predators, such as fish. They are identified by the brown of rust-red carapace and large chelipeds, which are usually blue in colour. Faxonius virilis feeds on a wide range of plants and invertebrates, as well as tadpoles and even small fish.

== Distribution ==
Juvenile's greenish colour will turn red on the carapace and blue on the claws with age

Faxonius virilis is found in southern Canada from Alberta to Quebec and in the northern United States, but has become an invasive species in parts of North America outside its native range, and was discovered in the United Kingdom in 2008. It is listed as a species of Least Concern on the IUCN Red List.

== Invasive status ==
In Europe, Faxonius virilis is included since 2016 in the list of Invasive Alien Species of Union concern (the Union list). This implies that this species cannot be imported, bred, transported, commercialized, or intentionally released into the environment in the whole of the European Union.

== Uses ==
Faxonius virilis is used as fishing bait and as food for humans, and also as aquarium food for carnivorous fish.
