= Faxonella =

Scientific classification
- Domain: Eukaryota
- Kingdom: Animalia
- Phylum: Arthropoda
- Class: Malacostraca
- Order: Decapoda
- Suborder: Pleocyemata
- Family: Cambaridae
- Genus: Faxonella; Creaser, 1933

Genus of crayfishes

Faxonella is a genus of crayfish from the Southern United States from Texas to Florida. It comprises the following species:

- Faxonella beyeri (Penn, 1950) "Sabine Fencing crayfish"
- Faxonella blairi (Hayes and Reimer, 1977) "Blair's Fencing crayfish"
- Faxonella clypeata (Hay, 1899) "Ditch Fencing crayfish or Shield crayfish"
- Faxonella creaseri (Walls, 1968) "Ouachita Fencing crayfish"
