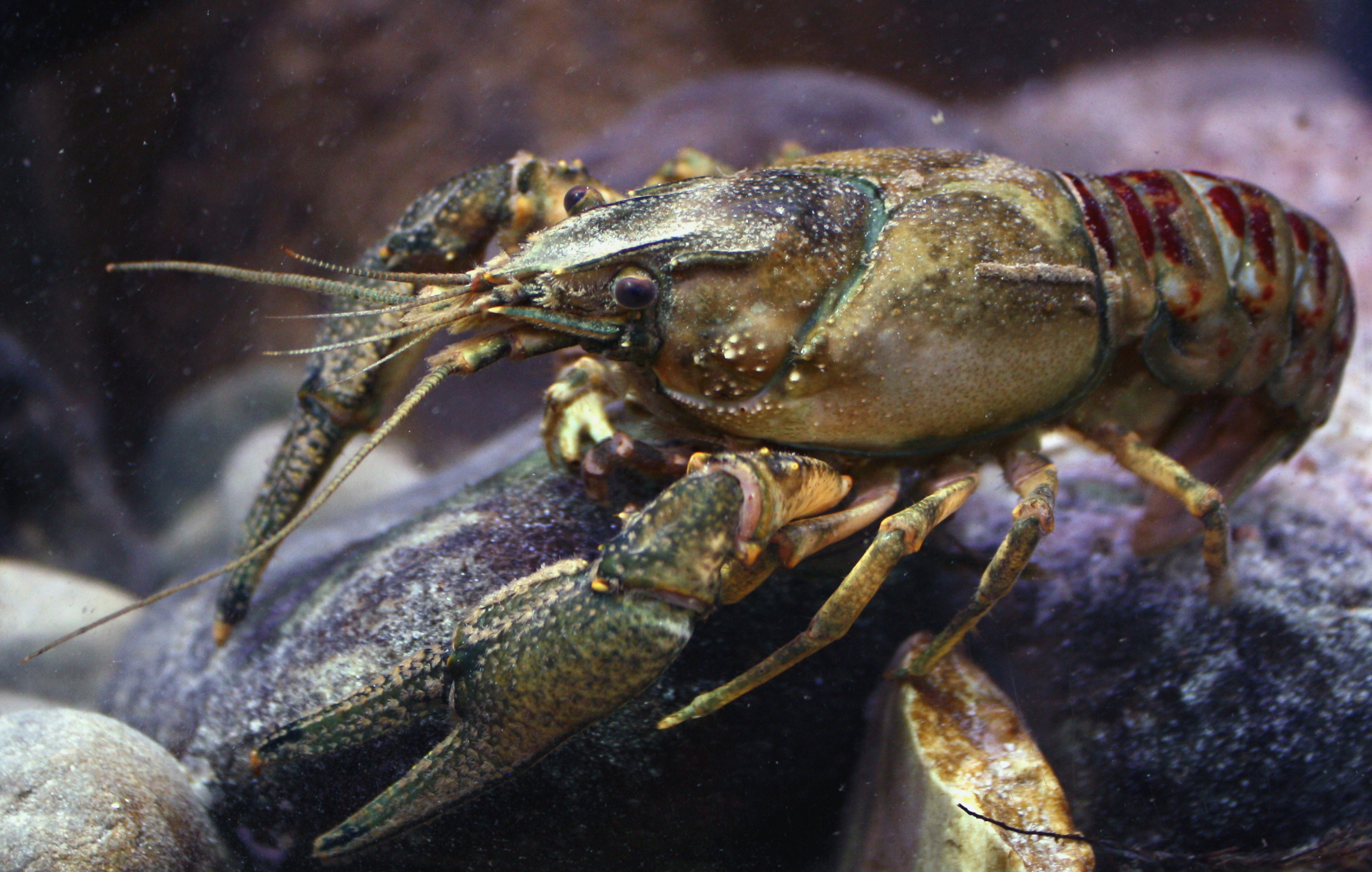

Conservation status
- Least Concern (IUCN 3.1)

- Secure (NatureServe)

Scientific classification
- Kingdom: Animalia
- Phylum: Arthropoda
- Clade: Pancrustacea
- Class: Malacostraca
- Order: Decapoda
- Suborder: Pleocyemata
- Family: Cambaridae
- Genus: Faxonius
- Species: F. limosus

Binomial name
- Faxonius limosus (Rafinesque, 1817)

Synonyms
- Astacus limosus Rafinesque, 1817; Astacus affinis Say, 1817; Cambarus affinis (Say, 1817); Cambarus pealei Girard, 1852; Orconectes limosus (Rafinesque, 1817)

= Faxonius limosus =

Spinycheek crayfish

Species of crayfish

Faxonius limosus, synonym Orconectes limosus, is a species of crayfish in the family Cambaridae. It is native to the east coast of North America, from Quebec to the lower James River, Virginia, but has also been introduced to Europe. It is known commonly as the spinycheek crayfish or Kamberkrebs in German.

It is unusual in that it lives in silty streams, rather than the clear water usually preferred by crayfish. Like Pacifastacus leniusculus, another invasive North American crayfish, F. limosus carries crayfish plague and is a threat to native European crayfish. However, P. leniusculus displays more aggressive behavior than F. limosus, and has been far more pervasive as an invasive threat.

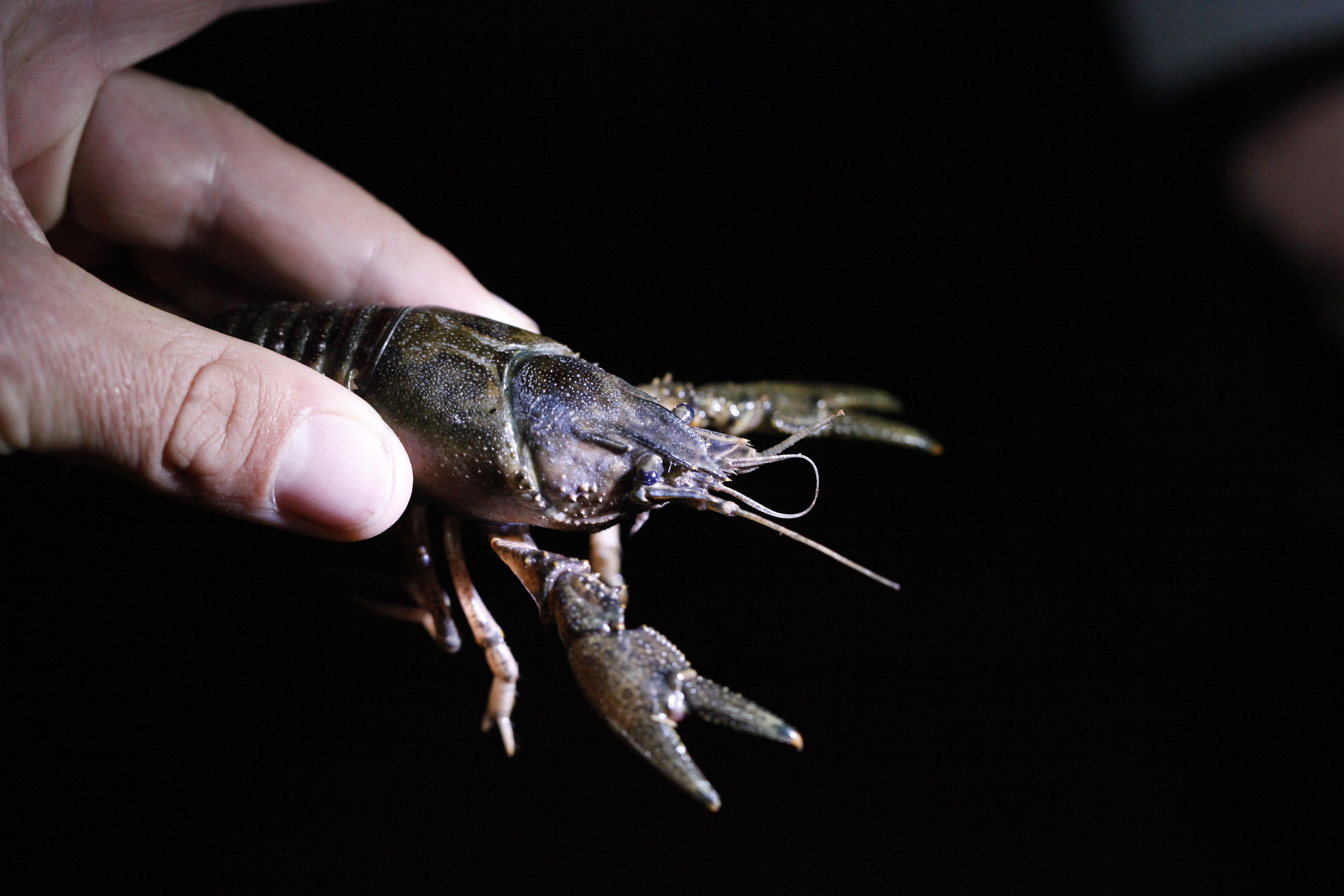
Size comparison with a human hand

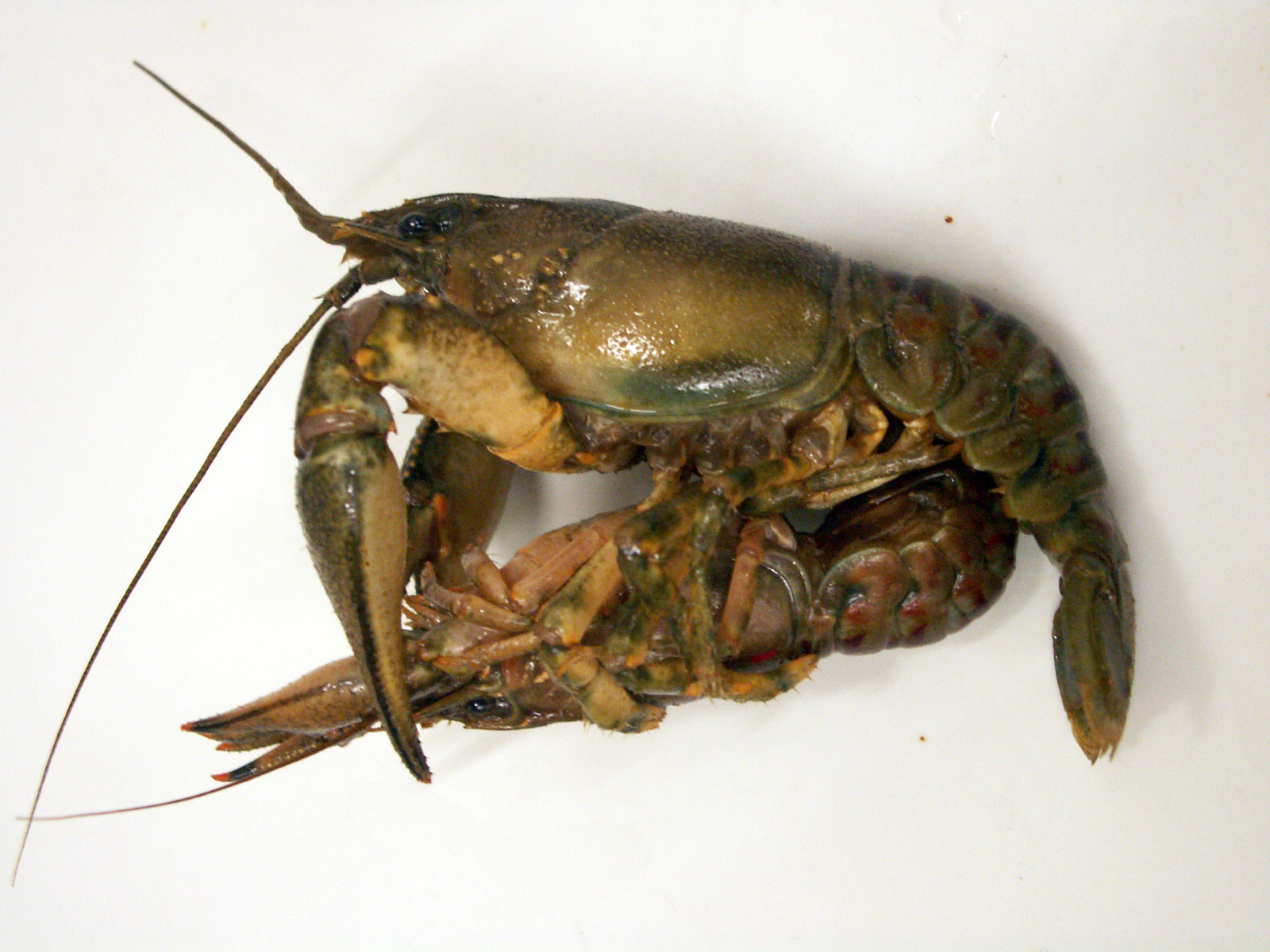
A mating pair, male on top and female below

F. limosus was introduced to Germany in 1890, and has since spread across much of Northern Europe, recently reaching the United Kingdom. It has also spread southwards as far as the Danube in Serbia.

In Europe, F. limosus has been included since 2016 on the list of Invasive Alien Species of Union concern (the Union list). This instructs that this species must not be imported, bred, transported, commercialized, or intentionally released into the environment in the whole of the European Union.

Faxonius limosus can reproduce sexually or by parthenogenesis. Lobsters and crayfish are decapods, meaning that they have 10 legs. Two of them are claws. These crayfish live on the bottom of the freshwater pools, such as lakes, ponds and swamps. They prefer flat, sandy, and rocky floors. They are also found outside the water on beaches or lawns near the pool of water. They use rocks to make burrows while in the water. This is a very common species of crayfish, especially in the Northeast United States and Southeast Canada.

== See also ==
- Crayfish as food
