= Walter Faxon =

American ornithologist and carcinologist (1848–1920)

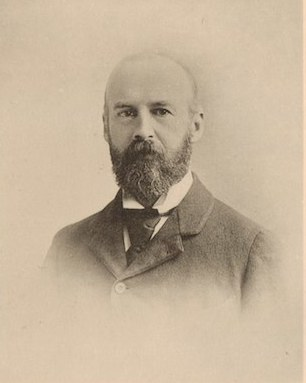
- Born: February 4, 1848; Jamaica Plain, Boston, Massachusetts, US
- Died: August 10, 1920 (aged 72); Lexington, Massachusetts, US
- Education: Harvard University
- Scientific career
- Fields: Ornithology; Carcinology
- Workplaces: Museum of Comparative Zoology

Walter Faxon (February 4, 1848 – August 10, 1920) was an American ornithologist and carcinologist who worked at the Museum of Comparative Zoology at Harvard University.

== Life and career ==
Faxon was born in Jamaica Plain, Massachusetts, where he grew up as one of seven children of Elisha and Hannah Faxon. His older brothers, Charles Edward Faxon and Edwin Faxon, became botanists, and Charles worked at the Arnold Arboretum.

Walter received his undergraduate and doctoral degrees from Harvard University: his A.B. in 1871, S.B. in 1872, and Sc.D. in 1878. He worked as curator of the invertebrates department at Harvard's Museum of Comparative Zoology from 1874 until his death in 1920. Concurrently, he served as an instructor and professor of zoology at Harvard from 1872 to 1886 and as assistant in charge of molluscs and crustacea from 1886.

As an ornithologist, Faxon demonstrated that Brewster's warbler is a hybrid. He spent many years researching and classifying many American crayfish, including the genera Astacus, Orconectes, and Procambarus, and contributed to at least 20 different scientific papers. In 1883, he was elected a Fellow of the American Academy of Arts and Sciences. He also collected numerous materials belonging to ornithologist Alexander Wilson, donating them to the Museum of Comparative Zoology.

Following a 2017 review, carried out by Oxford University, the former Faxonius subgenus of Orconectes was raised to a full genus as the subgenera were not monophyletic. The genus Faxonella is similarly named to honour Faxon.
