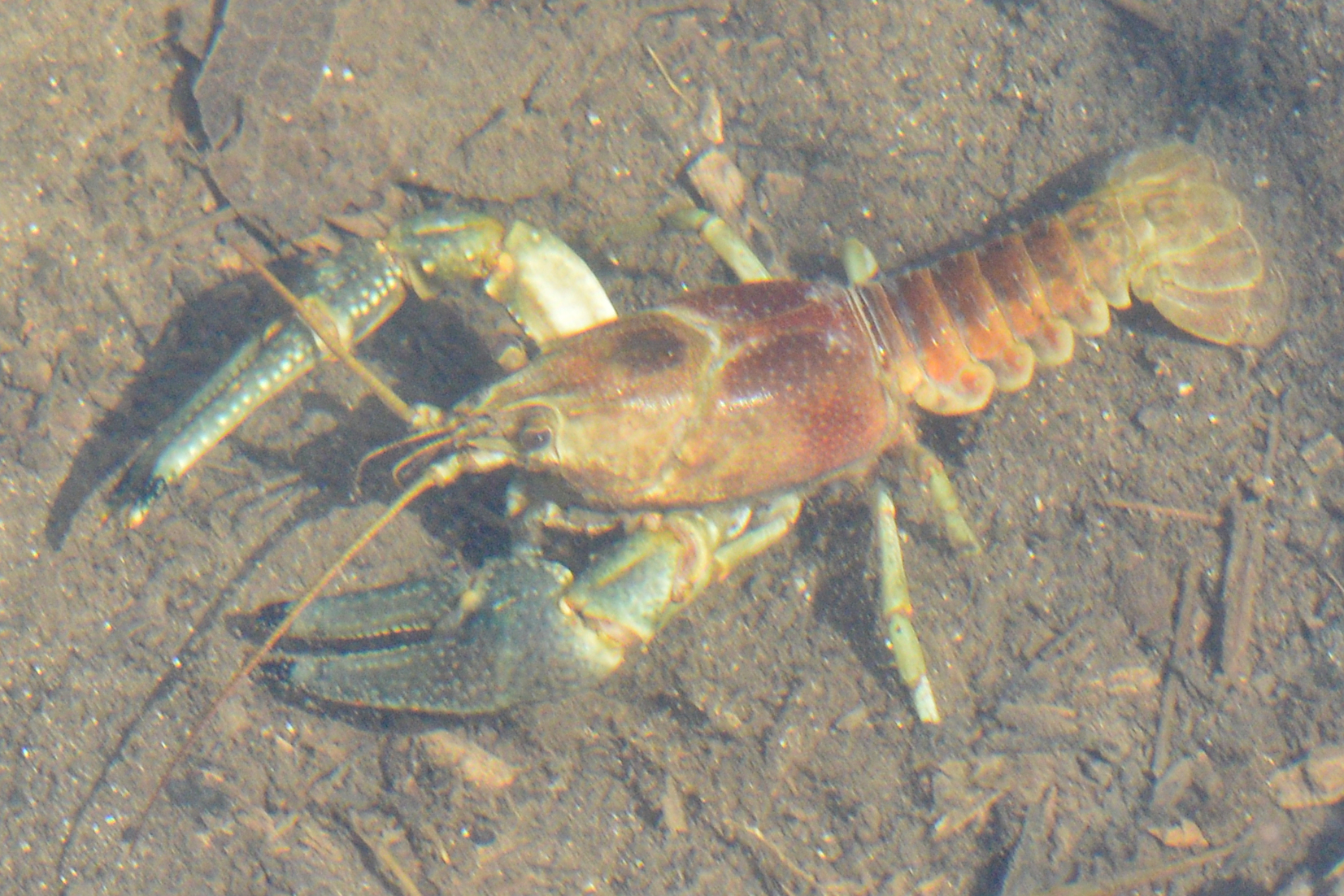
- Rusty crayfish (Faxonius rusticus) in Guelph, Ontario, Canada
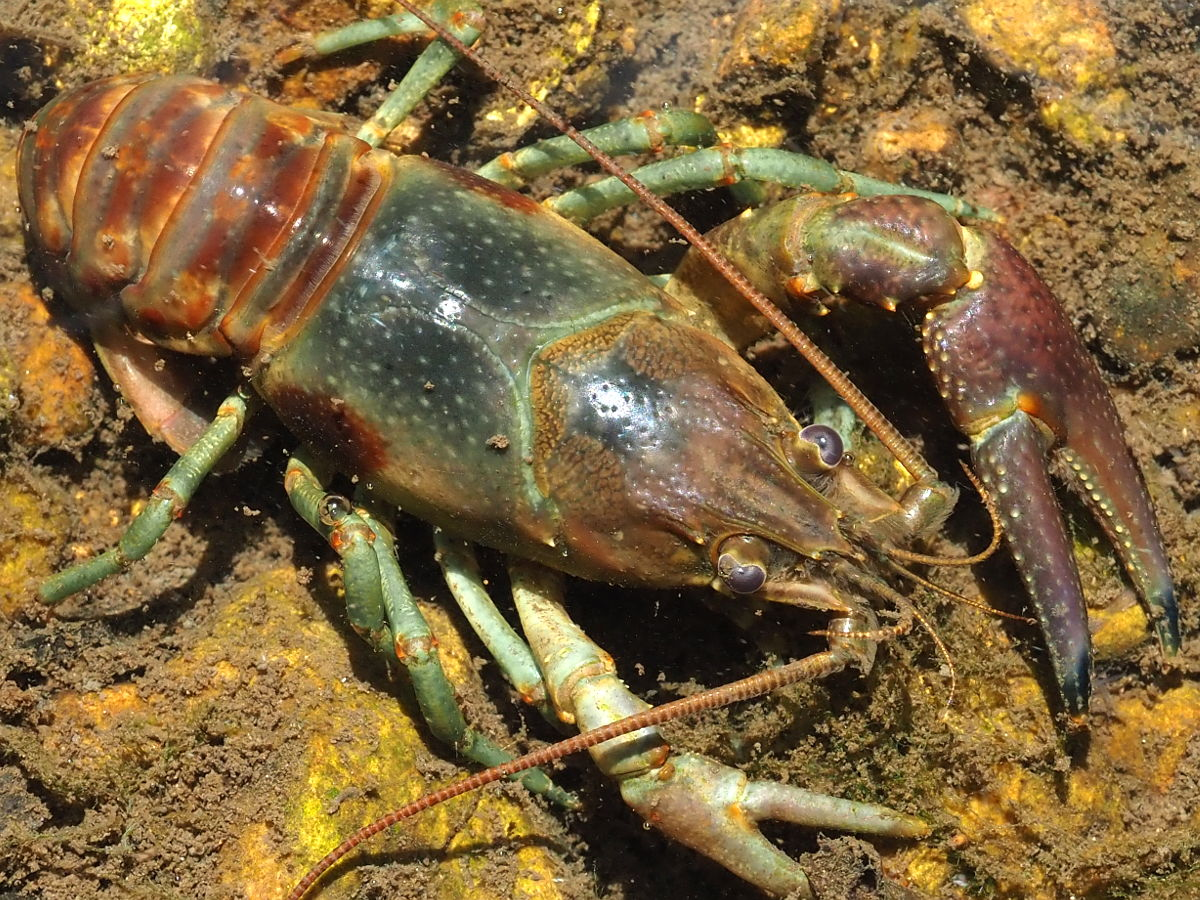
- Rusty spots on sides of carapace

Conservation status
- Least Concern (IUCN 3.1)

- Secure (NatureServe)

Scientific classification
- Kingdom: Animalia
- Phylum: Arthropoda
- Clade: Pancrustacea
- Class: Malacostraca
- Order: Decapoda
- Suborder: Pleocyemata
- Family: Cambaridae
- Genus: Faxonius
- Species: F. rusticus

Binomial name
- Faxonius rusticus (Girard, 1852)

Synonyms
- Cambarus rusticus Girard, 1852; Orconectes rusticus (Girard, 1852)

= Rusty crayfish =

Large species of freshwater crayfish which is native to the United States

The rusty crayfish (Faxonius rusticus) is a large, aggressive species of freshwater crayfish which is native to the United States, in the Ohio River Basin in parts of Ohio, Kentucky, and Indiana. Its range is rapidly expanding across much of eastern North America, displacing native crayfishes in the process. The rusty crayfish was first captured in Illinois in 1973, and has been collected at over 20 locations in the northern portion of the state. In 2005, F. rusticus was found for the first time west of the Continental Divide, in the John Day River, Oregon, which runs into the Columbia River.

== Description ==
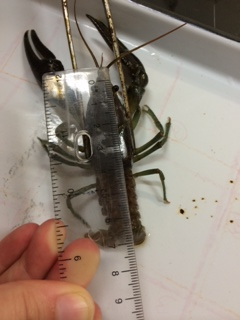
Measurement of a rusty crayfish

Adult rusty crayfish can reach 10 centimeters (4 inches) in length, although they reach maturity at about 4.4 cm (1.7 in), and can range in color from greenish grey, to reddish brown, They can be recognized by two "rusty", reddish colored spots variably present on the sides of their posterior carapace and their large front claws with black bands around the tips. Male astacoid crayfish have small hook-like features, or copulatory stylets, that are used to hold onto a female while mating, prominent in rusty crayfish on the ischia of the third pair of pereopods for those males in their form I (reproductive) molt.

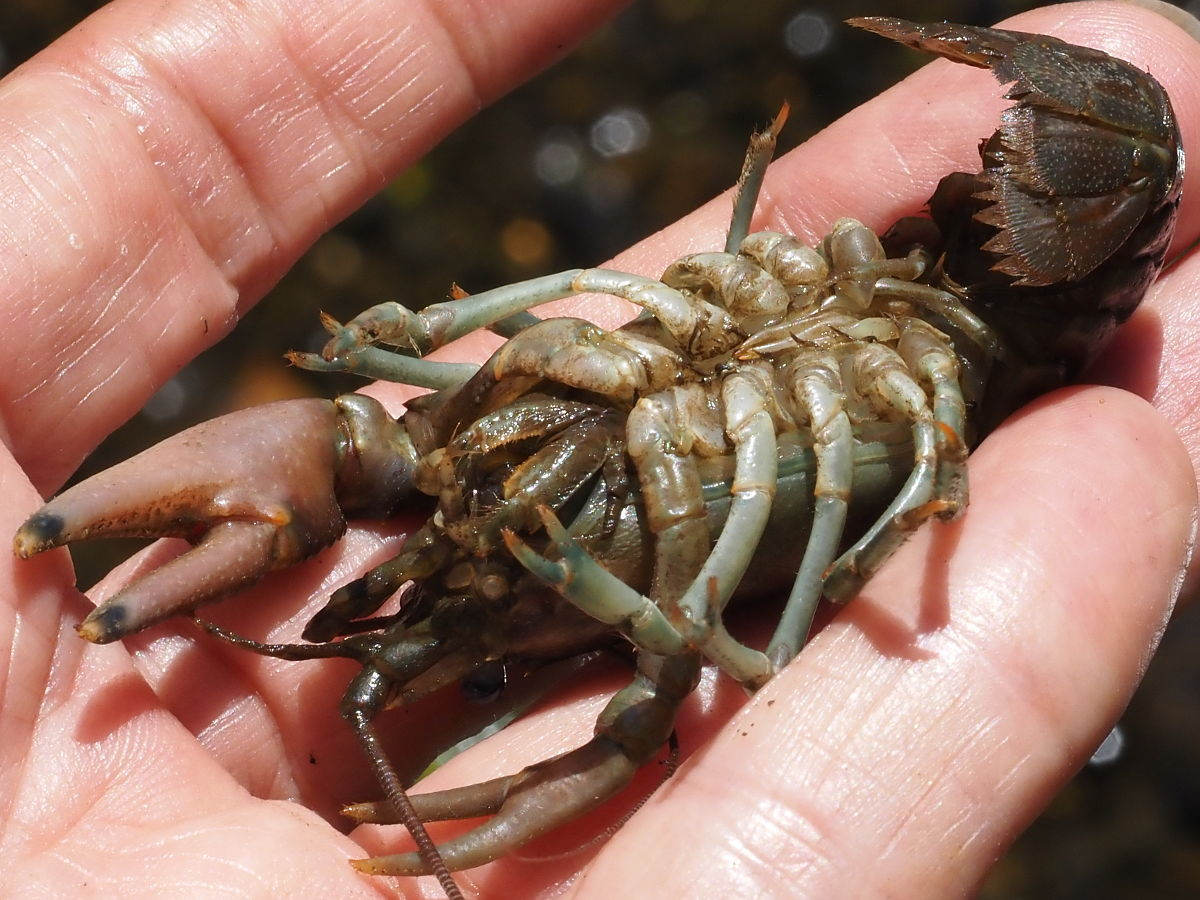
Male in Illinois

== Behavior ==
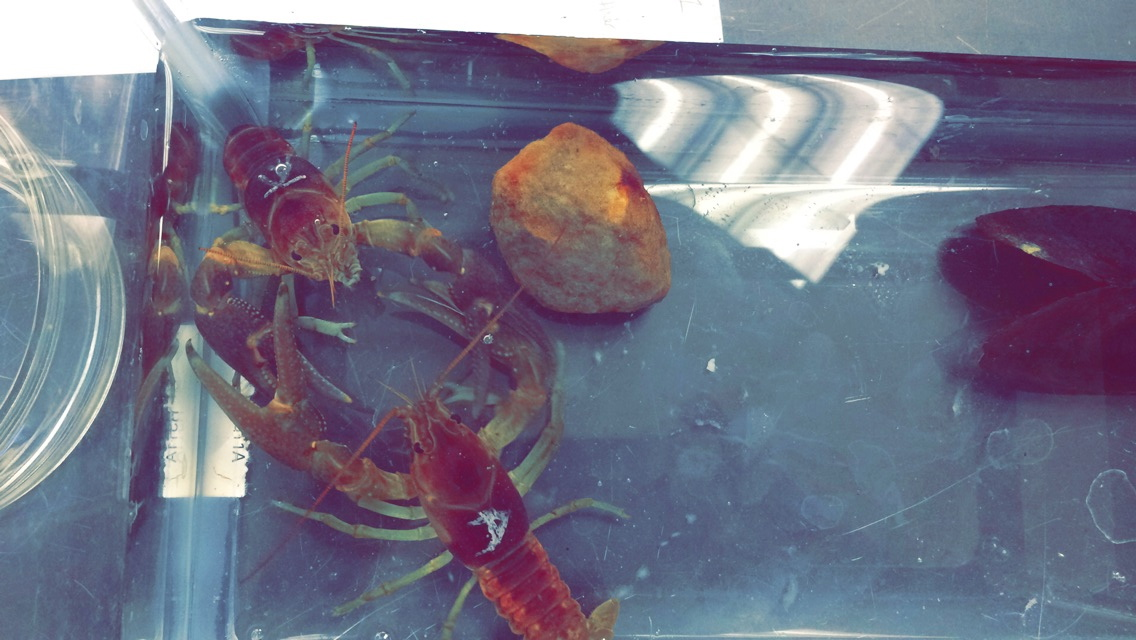
Two adult male rusty crayfish fighting for dominance.

Many species of vertebrates that live in communities together utilize a dominance hierarchy to establish order, and studies have shown that some species of invertebrates do as well. The dominance hierarchy is an important aspect of a crayfish's biology and behavior. Crayfish tend to form dominance hierarchies with the other members of their population in a particular environment. The largest male will generally demonstrate the most dominance over the others by being the most aggressive, and picking fights with the other, smaller crayfish. The crayfish that wins the most fights is placed at the top of the hierarchy with the other members generally ranking in descending order based on size and sex. Studies have suggested that the largest determining factor in the formation of dominance hierarchies is size rather than sex. That means that female rusty crayfish can rank higher in the dominance hierarchy than male rusty crayfish if they are larger than them.

== As an invasive species ==
The larger size and aggressive nature of rusty crayfish that have been introduced to a body of water makes it harder for them to be preyed upon by native species of fish, which are not accustomed to crayfish fighting them back. Instead of running away like the native crayfish species do when they come in contact with a predator, the rusty crayfish will take an attack stance with its claws raised above its head, which will generally scare away most predatory fish. Additionally, adult rusty crayfish can be too large for some fish to consume. Because the rusty crayfish are able to avoid predators fairly well, their population in these new aquatic ecosystems was able to grow extremely quickly and within twenty years the rusty crayfish population had exploded and become an invasive species in the Northern United States and parts of Canada. Because these rusty crayfish populations have basically taken over the natives species' habitats and forced them out of their homes, many populations of native crayfish have experienced drastic decline over the past fifty years and the rusty crayfish has become the dominant species in much of the Midwestern United States.

A number of introduction vectors have been responsible for the spread of rusty crayfish outside their natural range, including bait bucket discharge from recreational anglers, intentional releases by lake shoreline residents for nuisance weed control, biological supply and pet trades, and natural dispersal. Introductions into the John Day River Basin, Oregon, are speculated to be the result of its use in the biological curriculum of schools, which were released at the end of the school year.

=== Control efforts ===
A number of different control strategies are possible for crayfish, each with their own challenges. While chemicals that kill crayfish exist, none are specific to rusty crayfish. Harvesting for consumption is expected to solely impact the adult population. Once a population of rusty crayfish is introduced to a body of water, it may be very difficult to completely eradicate them. Therefore, the best control strategy is to try to prevent any further spread of the rusty crayfish. The best methods to prevent spread of invasive species are to learn to identify them, and to avoid using invasive species as bait or to otherwise transport them to bodies of water where they are not already present.

In the European Union, it is included in the list of invasive alien species of Union concern and hence cannot be imported, bred, transported, commercialized, or intentionally released into the environment in any of its member states.
