= St Teilo's Church =

St Teilo's Church may refer to:

in Wales

- St Teilo's Church, Bishopston, Swansea
- St Teilo's Church, Llandeilo, Carmarthenshire
- St Teilo's Church, Llandeilo Tal-y-bont, now reconstructed at St Fagans National History Museum, Cardiff
- St Teilo's Church, Llandeloy, Pembrokeshire
- St Teilo's Church, Llantilio Crossenny, Monmouthshire
- St Teilo's Church, Llantilio Pertholey, Monmouthshire
- St Teilo's Church, Merthyr Mawr, Bridgend
