= Levally =

Levally may refer to the following places in Ireland:

- Levally Lough, County Galway, a turlough in County Galway, Republic of Ireland
- Levally Lough, County Mayo, a lake in County Mayo, Republic of Ireland
- Levally Lower, a townland in County Fermanagh, Northern Ireland
