= Levally Lough =

Levally Lough, a lake in Ireland, may refer to:

- Levally Lough, County Galway, a turlough in County Galway
- Levally Lough, County Mayo, a lake in County Mayo
