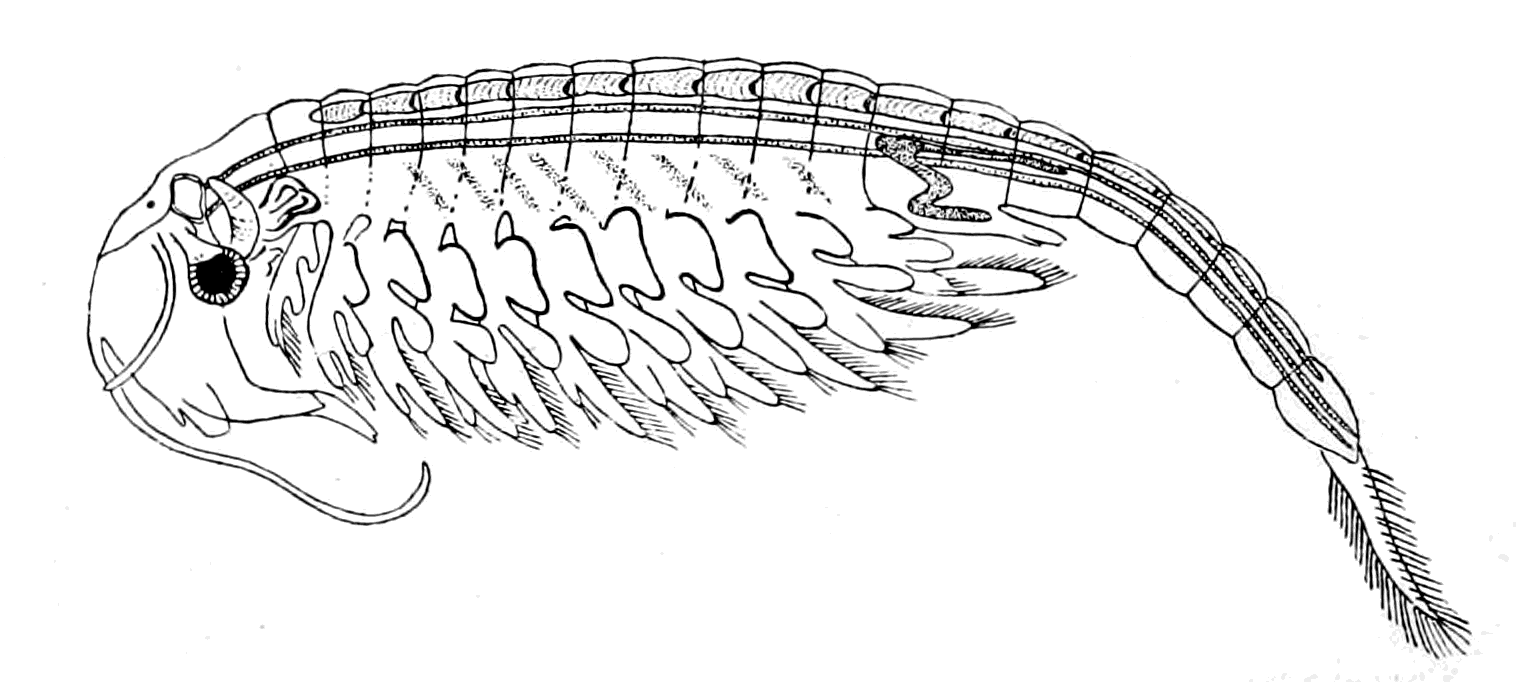

Scientific classification
- Kingdom: Animalia
- Phylum: Arthropoda
- Class: Branchiopoda
- Order: Anostraca
- Family: Tanymastigidae
- Genus: Tanymastix
- Species: T. stagnalis

Binomial name
- Tanymastix stagnalis (Linnaeus, 1758)

Synonyms
- Cancer stagnalis Linnaeus, 1758; Tanymastix lacunae (Guérin, 1829); Gammarus stagnalis (Linnaeus, 1758); Astacus stagnalis (Linnaeus, 1758); Branchipus lacunae (Guérin-Méneville, 1829); Chirocephalus lacunae Frauenfeld, 1873; Tanymastix lacunae Daday, 1910

= Tanymastix stagnalis =

Species of small freshwater animal

Tanymastix stagnalis is a species of Anostraca (fairy shrimp) that lives in temporary pools across Europe. It may reach up to 2 cm (0.8 in) in some areas and has 11 pairs of bristly, flattened appendages. It swims upside-down and filters food particles from the water. It is the only species of Anostraca in Ireland, having been discovered in Rahasane Turlough in 1974.

== Description ==
Tanymastix stagnalis has a pair of stalked eyes, and 11 pairs of thoracic appendages, called phyllopodia. The abdomen bears no appendages except for the caudal furca and the external genitalia. In the male the genitalia are a pair of retractable hemipenes, while the female has a brood pouch with two spines. The antennae are also sexually dimorphic, being prehensile in males. At the end of the abdomen, a caudal furca is made up of two red cercopods, which are long, thin and setose.

Reports of the size of Tanymastix stagnalis vary. In Spain, it is reported to reach lengths of 7–9 millimetres (0.3–0.4 in), while Macedonian examples reach 8–17 mm (0.3–0.7 in), and French specimens have been reported as long as 20 mm (0.8 in).

Tanymastix stagnalis can be most easy distinguished from other species in the order by the form of the males' antennae and frontal appendages.

== Life cycle ==
Tanymastix stagnalis survives drought as resting eggs, which are dark brown, 0.40–0.43 mm in diameter, coppery-brown in colour and, characteristically for the genus Tanymastix, lentil-shaped. Each ovisac produces 8–14 eggs, which are laid in open water. The eggs usually float, and tend to accumulate at the edges of the pool.

The egg hatches into a nauplius, but that stage lasts only a few hours. Sexual maturity is reached after 7–40 days, and the animal's longevity depends on the temperature and the season, ranging from 30 days in summer to over 60 days in winter.

== Ecology ==
Like other members of the Anostraca, T. stagnalis swims with the ventral side upwards by beating its flattened thoracic appendages, or phyllopodia. It has been variously described as a cold stenothermal species, or as a warm stenothermal species. The species' temperature limits appear to vary between populations, with maxima of 16 °C (61 °F) reported for some populations, 20 °C (68 °F) for Irish populations, and up to 25 °C (77 °F) in Germany and elsewhere. The optimum temperature has been quoted as 10–17 °C (50–63 °F) or 12–15 °C (54–59 °F). Nauplii have been observed at temperatures of 3–12 °C (37–54 °F).

In North Macedonia, T. stagnalis lives in pools only 20–60 centimetres (7.9–23.6 in) in diameter, and 10–20 cm (3.9–7.9 in) deep, containing a few litres of water each. Larger pools in the area harbour Chirocephalus diaphanus instead. In Spain, its distribution is seasonal; in winter it is found in rain puddles on the plains, while in summer it can only be found in mountainous areas. In all cases, the pools overlie acidic igneous rocks, and they are usually mineral-poor and retain some moisture in the sediment when they dry out.

Like all Anostraca, T. stagnalis is a filter feeder, removing microplankton, microorganisms and other organic material from suspension with its bristly phyllopodia.

Tanymastix stagnalis is sensitive to changes in the intensity of light, and respond to sudden shade by swimming towards the bottom of the pool, or even burying themselves in the sediment. The main threat to them is perturbation of the habitat, in particular the introduction of predators such as the fishes Lepomis gibbosus and Gambusia affinis.

== Distribution ==
Tanymastix stagnalis has a wide circum-Mediterranean distribution across Europe and Algeria, stretching from the Iberian Peninsula in the west to south-western Russia in the east, and northwards through Germany to Scandinavia. Its distribution is scattered within this area. For example, in North Macedonia, it is present only in pools among andesite tuffs above Stracin (Страцин), and in Denmark it is only known from Råbjerg Mile pools.

It was originally described from a site near Uppsala, Sweden, which is near the northern limit of its range. A more northerly population was found in 1913 at an altitude of 3,500 ft (1,100 m) above Surendal, Norway. The population from 1913 is probably extinct, but the species is known from three other high altitude locations in the Trollheimen mountains.

Tanymastix stagnalis is the only Anostracan species to occur in Ireland, and one of only two in the British Isles (the other being Chirocephalus diaphanus which occurs in a few sites in southern England). It was discovered in Rahasane Turlough in 1974, and was soon discovered at six other sites, in temporary pools in fields, which may be more likely to represent the species' usual habitat. T. stagnalis is thought to have arrived in Ireland in mud on the legs of a migratory bird, or on the footwear of a wildfowler; various ducks such as mallard, teal and shoveller, and waders such as lapwing and curlew have been observed in Ireland after migrating from areas with T. stagnalis populations, such as Scandinavia and France.

In France, T. stagnalis is found in the Forest of Fontainebleau near Paris, in the Camargue, in the Var and in the Rhône Valley. It is also found on Corsica, Sardinia and Capraia.

== Taxonomic history ==
Tanymastix stagnalis was named by Carl Linnaeus in the 1758 10th edition of Systema Naturae, where it was called Cancer stagnalis. It was transferred by Simon to his new genus Tanymastix in 1886.
