= Llantilio =

Llantilio may refer to either of two villages in Monmouthshire, south east Wales:

- Llantilio Crossenny
- Llantilio Pertholey
