= Carmel National Nature Reserve =

Nature reserve in Carmarthenshire, Wales

Carmel National Nature Reserve lies close to the village of Carmel in Carmarthenshire. It lies south of Llandeilo not far from the main road to Llanelli. There is a small car park and picnic site for visitors, and footpaths for access. There is an explanatory notice board at the car park. The site is managed by the Wildlife Trust of South and West Wales and Natural Resources Wales (NRW).

== Turlough ==
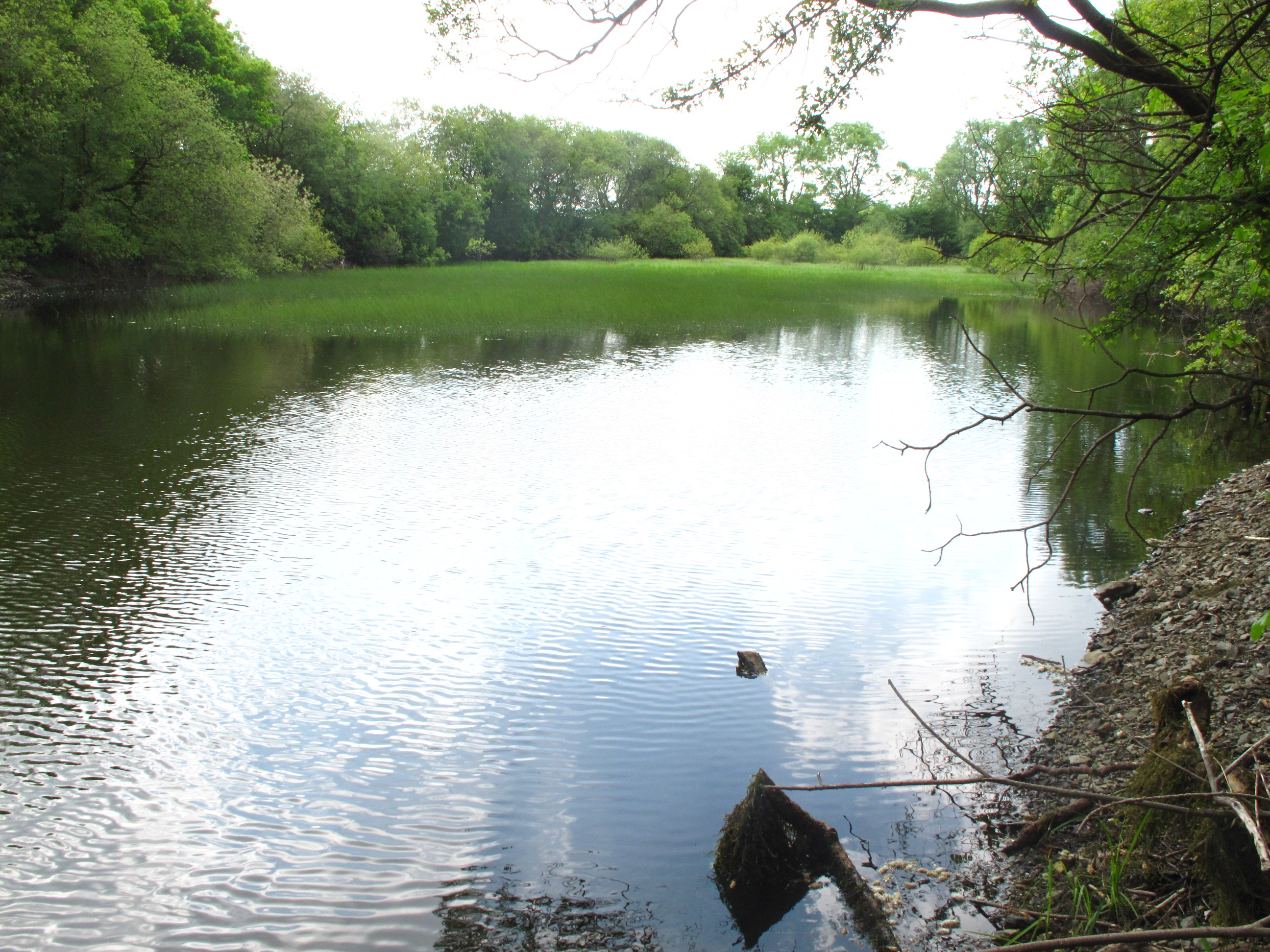
Pant-y-Llyn

Its remarkable geology is mainly Carboniferous Limestone, and is the location of a turlough or disappearing lake. They are more frequent in Ireland. The lake fills up in the autumn and winter, being fed only by groundwater. The lake disappears by the summer, and is the only known example in Britain. Pant-y-Llyn turlough occupies a small depression on the northern perimeter of the South Wales Coalfield at Cernydd Carmel. This depression represents a glacial channel formed along the Betws Fault where displacement has brought Carboniferous Limestone into contact with older impervious Devonian rock. The hydrological regime of the waterbody is linked to local groundwater behaviour within the limestone. The basin fills to a depth of about 3 m during late autumn and remains full until the following summer when it empties completely, thus reflecting the characteristic behaviour of turloughs. There are no surface drainage channels and a swallow hole is located at the northern end of the basin.

All of the turloughs are found in limestone areas. This is because limestone can be dissolved away by rainwater, which becomes mildly acidic by picking up carbon dioxide as it passes through the atmosphere. The cracks or joints in the rock become widened to such an extent that eventually all of the rain falling on the limestone disappears underground and the water moves through the rock openings ranging from cracks a few millimetres wide to large cave passages. The limestone is then said to be karstified with many characteristic landscape features.

== Flora ==
Over one hundred species of indigenous woodland plants have been recorded on the site, and a similar number of mosses and other non-vascular plants live there. Some parts of the woodland, which has been in existence since the Middle Ages, are coppiced in order to encourage the growth of wildflowers that need more light, but other parts are managed on a 'minimal intervention' basis and left largely alone. Some rare species found here include mezereon (Daphne mezereum), toothwort (Lathraea squamaria), lily-of-the-valley (Convallaria majalis) and herb paris (Paris quadrifolia).

== Fauna ==
Frogs, toads and newts breed in the turlough lake and nearby caves are home to bats, including the rare greater horseshoe bat (Rhinolophus ferrumequinium). Dormice are present in the coppiced woodland. There are several species of butterfly here as well as a great variety of insect life.

The soils provide an unusual combination of habitats to exist side by side, including ash woods, species-rich grassland, heathland and open water. The spring flowers include the primrose or Primula vulgaris and the lesser celandine. The local landscape is a mix of traditional agriculture and quarrying activity, with ancient woodlands, and field systems. Forestry is also practised.

== See also ==
- Karst landscape
