= Shire Hall, Llandeilo =

Municipal Building in Llandeilo, Wales

- Hengwrt (Welsh)
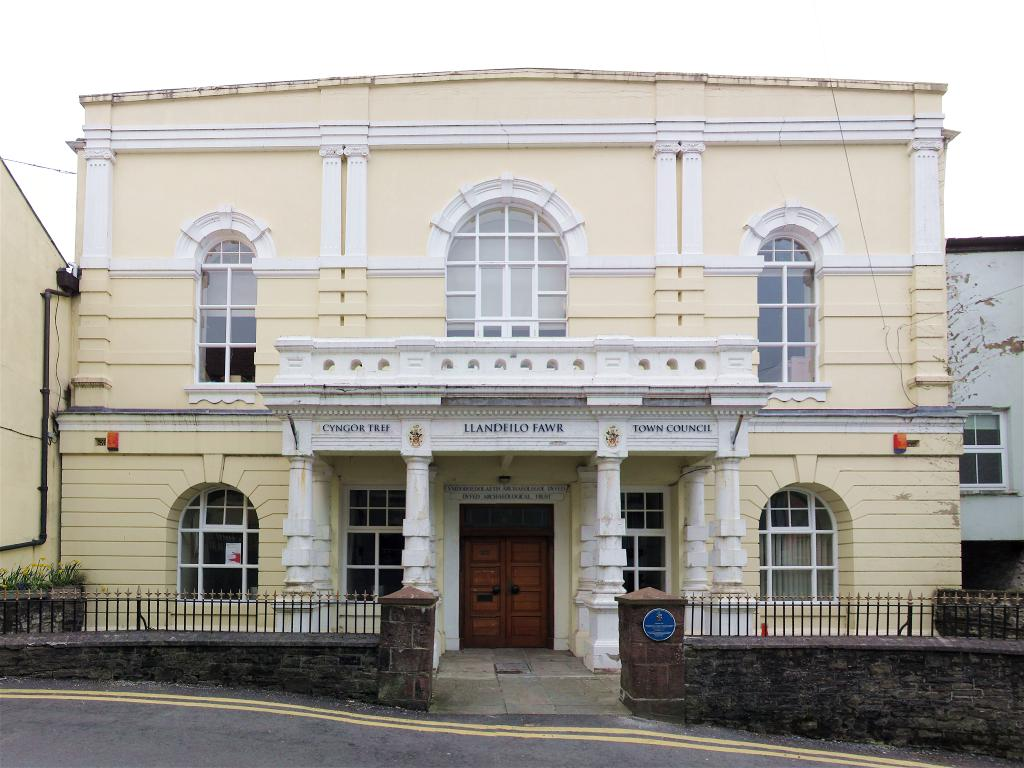
- The building in 2013

- Shown in Carmarthenshire
- 51.8830°N 3.9937°W
- Location: Carmarthen Street, Llandeilo

History
- Built: 1802

Site notes
- Architect: Thomas Humphreys
- Architectural style: Neoclassical style

The Shire Hall (Welsh: Hengwrt) is a municipal building in Carmarthen Street, Llandeilo, Carmarthenshire, Wales. The structure, which was used as a courthouse for over a century, is now the meeting place of Llandeilo Town Council.

== History ==
The building was commissioned as a courthouse for the county of Carmarthenshire. The site selected was on the north side of Carmarthen Street. It was designed by Thomas Humphreys of Carmarthen in the neoclassical style, built in brick with a stucco finish and was completed in 1802. The design involved a symmetrical main frontage of three bays facing onto Carmarthen Street. It was arcaded on the ground floor, so that markets could be held, with a courtroom on the first floor. The Epiphany, Easter and Michaelmas quarter sessions were held in Carmarthen Guildhall, while the Midsummer quarter sessions were held in the courtroom at the shire hall at Llandeilo. The ground floor was also used as a corn exchange, although that use declined significantly in the wake of the Great depression of British agriculture in the late 19th century.

The main frontage was extensively remodelled to a design by David Jenkins in 1901. The central bay featured a wide portico formed by four banded Doric order columns supporting an entablature, a cornice and a balcony with a stone balustrade; at the back of the portico there was a doorway with a stone surround and a fanlight flanked by a pair of cross-windows. There was a French door on the first floor which led out onto the balcony. The outer bays were fenestrated by round headed windows with keystones on the ground floor and by narrower round headed windows with moulded surrounds and keystones on the first floor. The bays on the first floor were flanked by fluted Ionic order pilasters, which were paired on either side of the central bay, supporting an entablature and a slightly gabled parapet. Internally, the principal area remained the courtroom on the first floor.

In the early 20th century, the ground floor became the headquarters of the Carmarthenshire County Constabulary, while the first floor continued to operate as a courtroom. By the mid-20th century the building was in a dilapidated condition and hearings had to be transferred to Carmarthen. The shire hall was refurbished in 1970s and subsequently used a venue for community events and as home to the local history museum. It also accommodated the offices of Llandeilo Town Council and Dyfed Archaeological Trust.

A major programme of refurbishment works, undertaken with financial support from the National Lottery Community Fund and the Welsh Government, was carried out at a cost of £1.4 million in 2021. The works involved installation of a new lift and a new heating system as well as repairs to the roof. A new exhibition space was also created on the ground floor. Following completion of the works, Menter Bro Dinefwr (English: The Dinefwr Initiative), an organisation established to promote the use of the Welsh language and support the local economy, was granted a long lease by the town council and took over responsibility for the management of the building. The building subsequently accommodated the headquarters of Menter Bro Dinefwr, as well as a council chamber and offices for Llandeilo Town Council and a heritage and cultural centre.
