= Carmel, Carmarthenshire =

Village in Carmarthenshire, Wales

Coordinates: 51.82952°N 4.05355°W

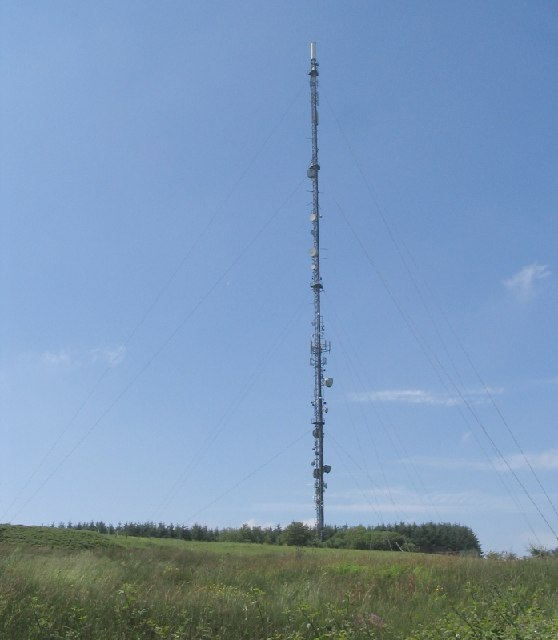
TV Mast in the village, visible for miles

Carmel is a village in Carmarthenshire, Wales near the village of Cross Hands.

Carmel is on the A476 and is approximately halfway between Crosshands and Llandeilo. Nearby is the National Nature Reserve "Carmel Woods", managed jointly by the Grasslands Trust, Tarmac, and the Countryside Council for Wales.

Carmel also lies near the Ogof Twn Siôn Cati and Carreg Cennen Castle caves.

== See also ==
- Carmel National Nature Reserve
