= Cernydd Carmel =

Protected area in Carmarthenshire, Wales

Coordinates: 51.8255°N 4.043°W

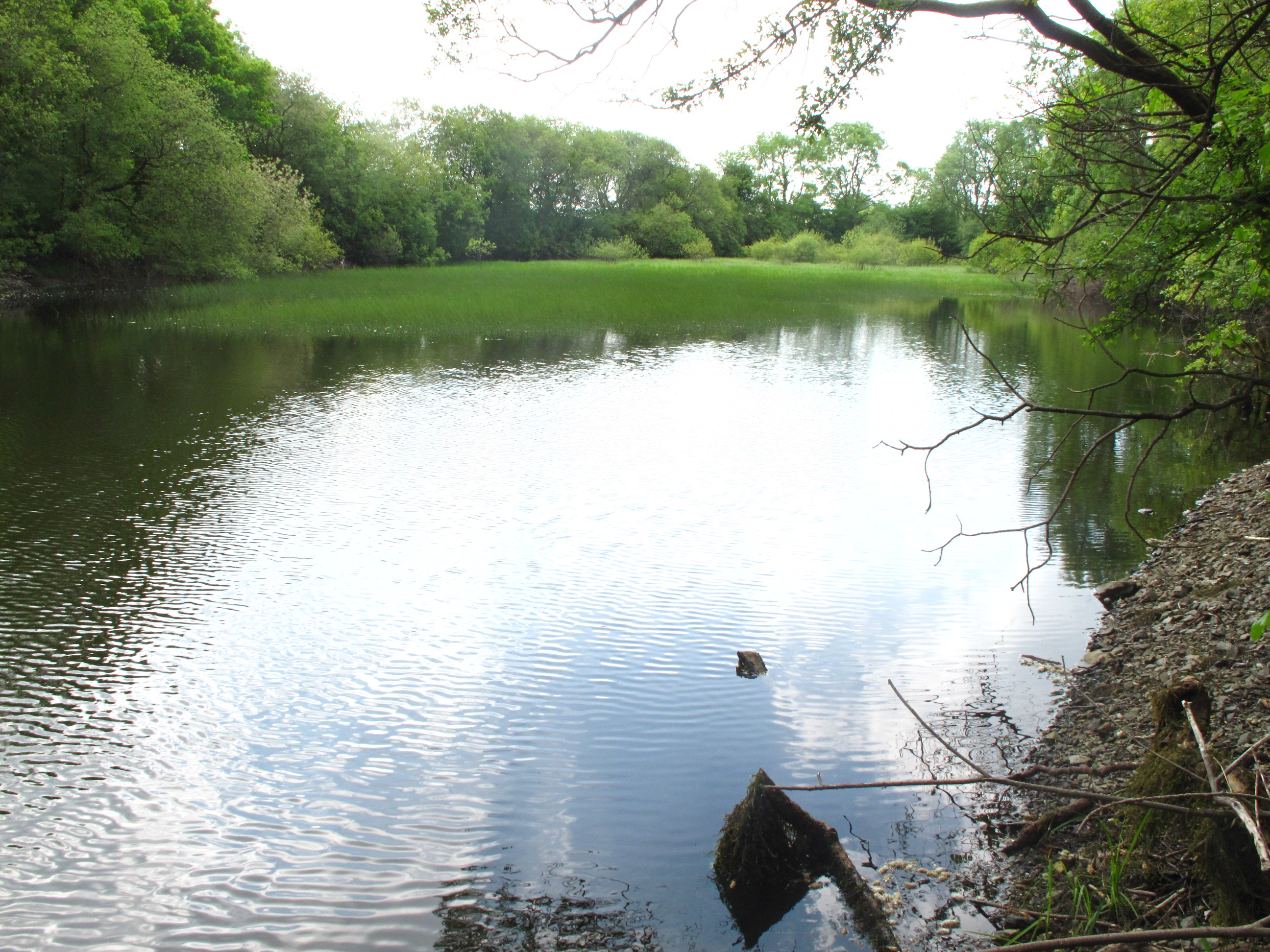
Pant-y-Llyn

Cernydd Carmel is a Site of Special Scientific Interest in Carmarthenshire, Wales.

Carmel Woods National Nature Reserve is located on part of the SSSI, and is open to the public.

Pant-y-Llyn at Cernydd Carmel is the only turlough in Britain, a type of seasonal lake found in limestone areas, the other examples of which are in Ireland. Pant-y-Llyn fills to a depth of about 3 metres (10 ft) each autumn, and remains full until it empties completely into a sink hole the following summer. There are no surface drainage streams.

== See also ==
- List of Sites of Special Scientific Interest in Carmarthen & Dinefwr
