= Llandeilo =

Town and community in Carmarthenshire, Wales

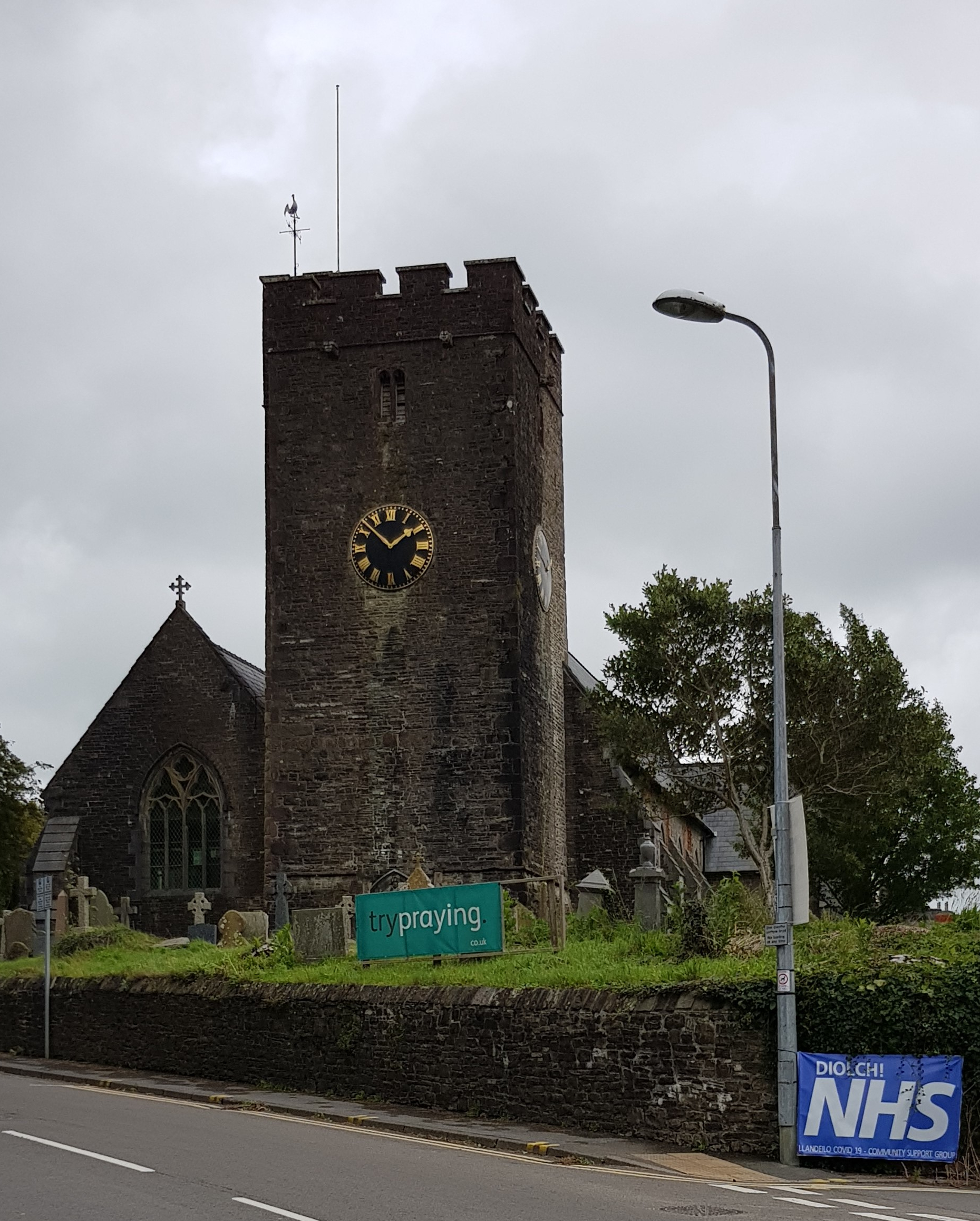
- St Teilo's Church, Llandeilo

- Location within Carmarthenshire
- Population: 1,784 (Community, 2021)
- OS grid reference: SN625225
- Community: Llandeilo
- Principal area: Carmarthenshire
- Preserved county: Dyfed
- Country: Wales
- Sovereign state: United Kingdom
- Post town: LLANDEILO
- Postcode district: SA19
- Dialling code: 01558
- Police: Dyfed-Powys
- Fire: Mid and West Wales
- Ambulance: Welsh
- UK Parliament: Caerfyrddin
- Senedd Cymru – Welsh Parliament: Carmarthen East and Dinefwr
- List of places UK Wales Carmarthenshire 51.885°N 3.992°W Map of the community

Llandeilo (Welsh pronunciation: [ɬanˈdeilɔ]) is a town and community in Carmarthenshire, Wales, situated where the River Towy is crossed by the A483 on a 19th-century stone bridge. At the 2021 census the community had a population of 1,784. It is adjacent to the westernmost point of the Brecon Beacons National Park. The town is served by Llandeilo railway station on the Heart of Wales Line.

In 2021, The Sunday Times called the town one of the top six places to live in Wales. The newspaper praised the town as a ‘sophisticated shopping destination and a great showcase for local arts and crafts’.

== History ==
=== Early history ===
Roman soldiers were active in the area around Llandeilo around AD 74, as evidenced by the foundations of two castra discovered on the grounds of the Dinefwr estate. The fortifications measured 3.85 hectares and 1.54 hectares, respectively. Roman roads linked Llandeilo with Llandovery and Carmarthen. A small civil settlement developed outside the gates of the fort and may have continued in use as the embryonic town after the Romans left in around AD 120.

Llandeilo is named after one of the better-known Celtic saints of the 6th century, Saint Teilo. The Welsh word llan signified a monastery or a church. Saint Teilo, who was a contemporary of Saint David, the patron saint of Wales, established a clas (a small monastic settlement) on the site of the present-day parish church. There is reasonable evidence to suggest, however, that Saint Teilo was buried in Llandeilo. The parish church of Llandeilo Fawr ("Great Llandeilo") is dedicated to Saint Teilo, and until 1880 its churchyard encompassed his baptistery.

The early Christian settlement that developed around the Saint Teilo's Church prospered, and by the early 9th century it had attained considerable ecclesiastical status as the seat of a Bishop-Abbot. The Church of St Teilo soon became a "mother church" to the surrounding district, acquiring an extensive estate, and possessing one of Wales' most beautiful and finely illustrated manuscripts – the Gospel Book of Saint Teilo. The discovery of fragments of two large Celtic crosses from this period provides further testimony to Llandeilo's importance and prestige as an early ecclesiastical centre. Towards the end of the 9th century, the importance of Llandeilo as a spiritual centre had started to decline.

Dinefwr Castle (anglicised as Dynevor) overlooks the River Tywi near the town. It lies on a ridge on the northern bank of the Tywi, with a steep drop of about 250 feet (76 m) to the river. Dinefwr was the chief seat of the kingdom of Deheubarth.

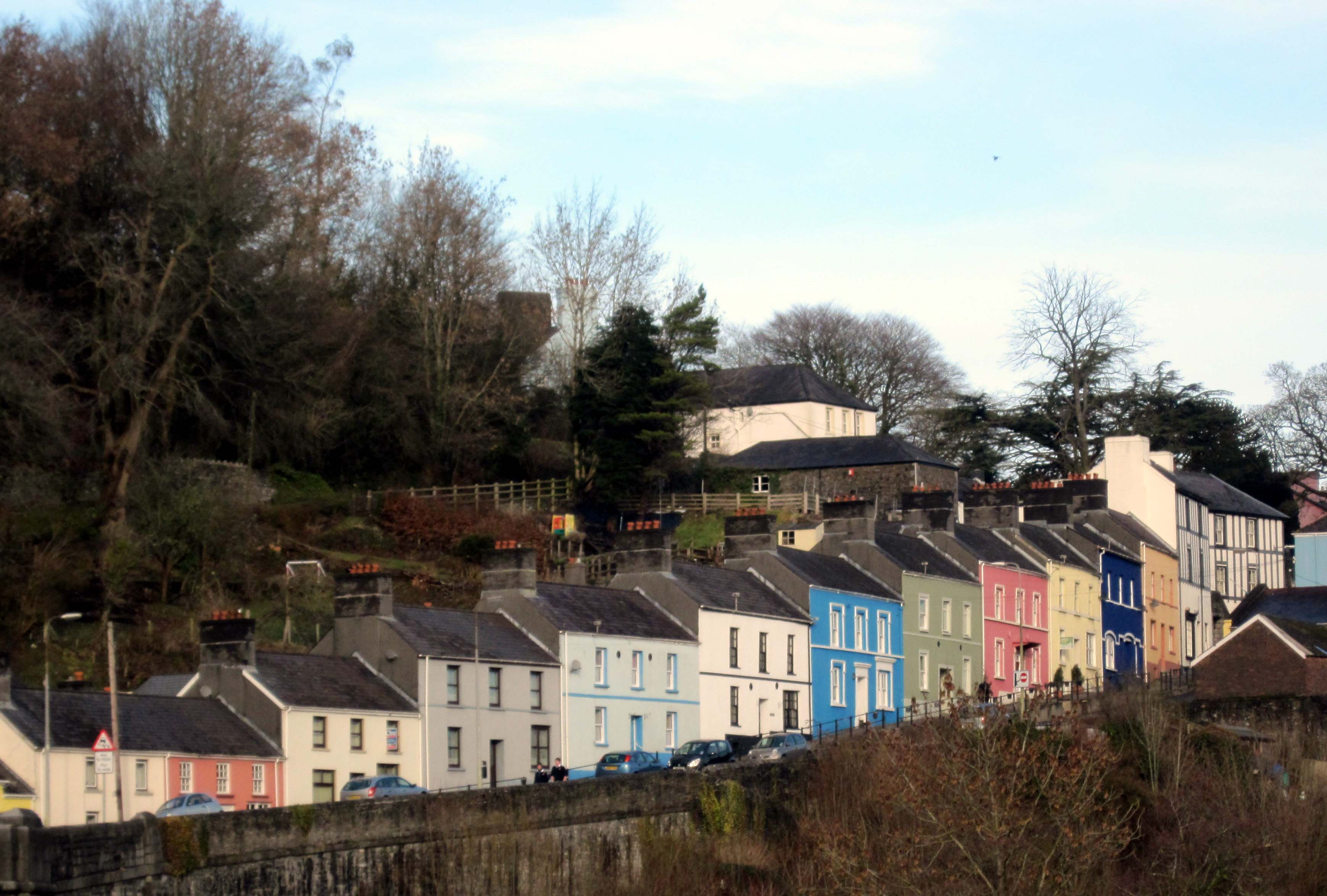
Houses along Llandeilo bridge

The estate of Golden Grove lies near the town, and further away, the impressive Carreg Cennen Castle, another Welsh stronghold. The remains of Talley Abbey can be seen 6 miles (9.7 km) away to the north of the town. 10 miles (16 km) further north are the remains of the Roman Dolaucothi Gold Mines.

=== Medieval period ===
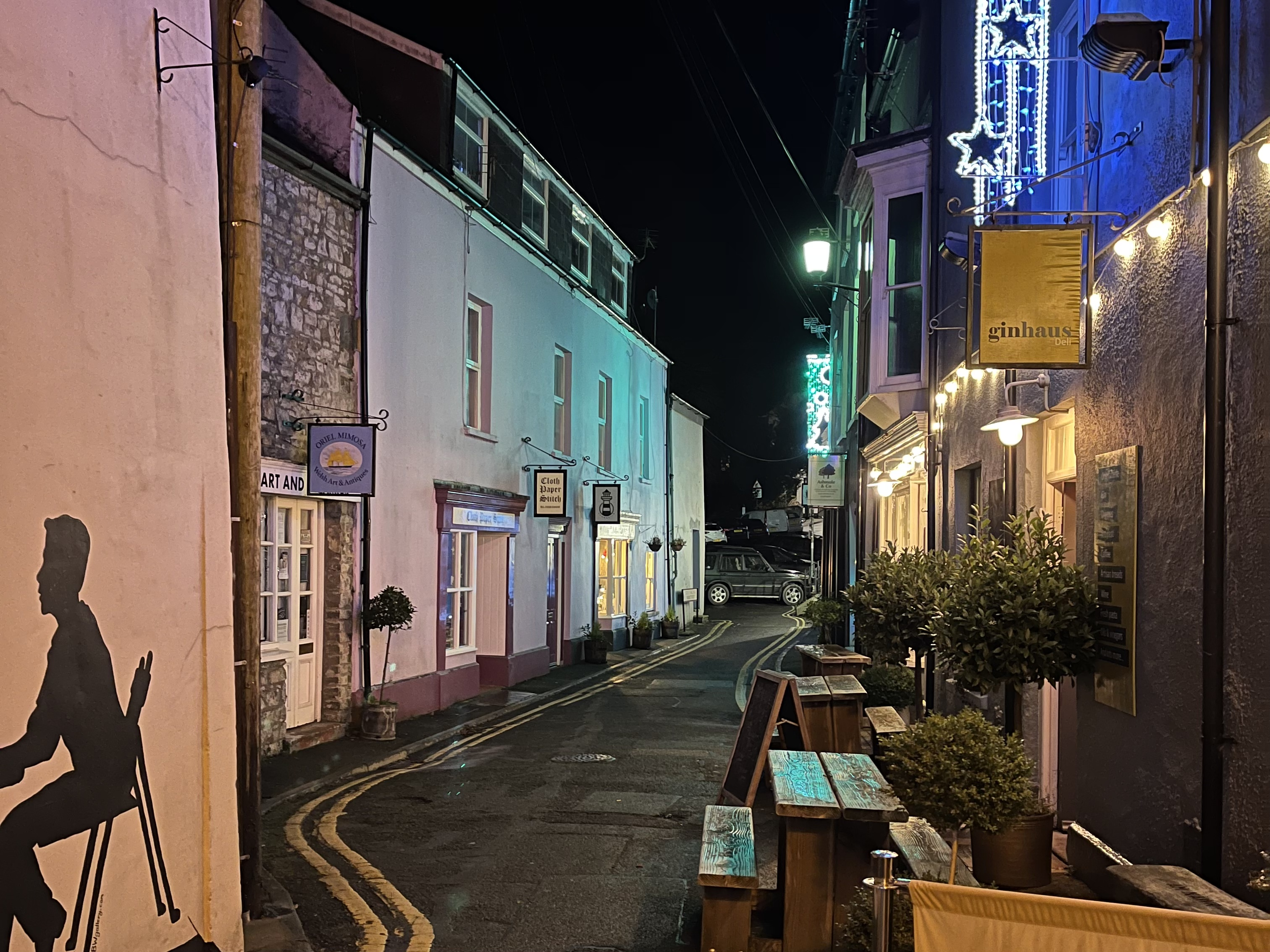
Market Street, Llandeilo

In the centuries that followed the Norman conquest of England, the Bishop of Llandaff and Bishop of St David's both claimed Llandeilo for their respective dioceses. By the early 12th century, Llandeilo came under the patronage of the Bishopric of St David's, an ecclesiastic borough that became responsible for the affairs of the town including its development as an important medieval market centre to an extensive agricultural hinterland. Until the middle of the 20th century, a fair called St. Teilo's Fair, which had been authorised initially by Edward I of England in 1291, was held annually in the churchyard. Some of the agricultural produce and other goods offered for sale are recorded to have been displayed on the tombstones.

The town was put to the torch during Owain Glyndŵr's march through the Tywi Valley in July 1403. Nearby Carreg Cennen Castle was besieged by Yorkist forces in 1461 during the Wars of the Roses and partially demolished.

=== Early modern period to the present ===
At the Reformation, the town was at the centre of the parish known as Llandeilo Fawr. It was in the Diocese of St Davids and part of the archdeaconry of Carmarthen. In 1560, the bishop of St Davids recorded the population of Llandeilo Fawr as 620 households (perhaps amounting to 2,790 people), many of whom would have lived in Llandeilo itself.

In the middle of the 17th century, Llandeilo was in the area of influence of the royalist general Sir Henry Vaughan. A royalist skirmish took place in the town in April 1648, defeating elements of the New Model Army.

In 1887, John Bartholomew's Gazetteer of the British Isles described Llandeilo as having a population of 1,533. He observed that “the principal trade of the town is in corn and flour; the other industries include woollen cloth mills, timber and saw mills, and tanneries”.

== Llandeilo bridges ==
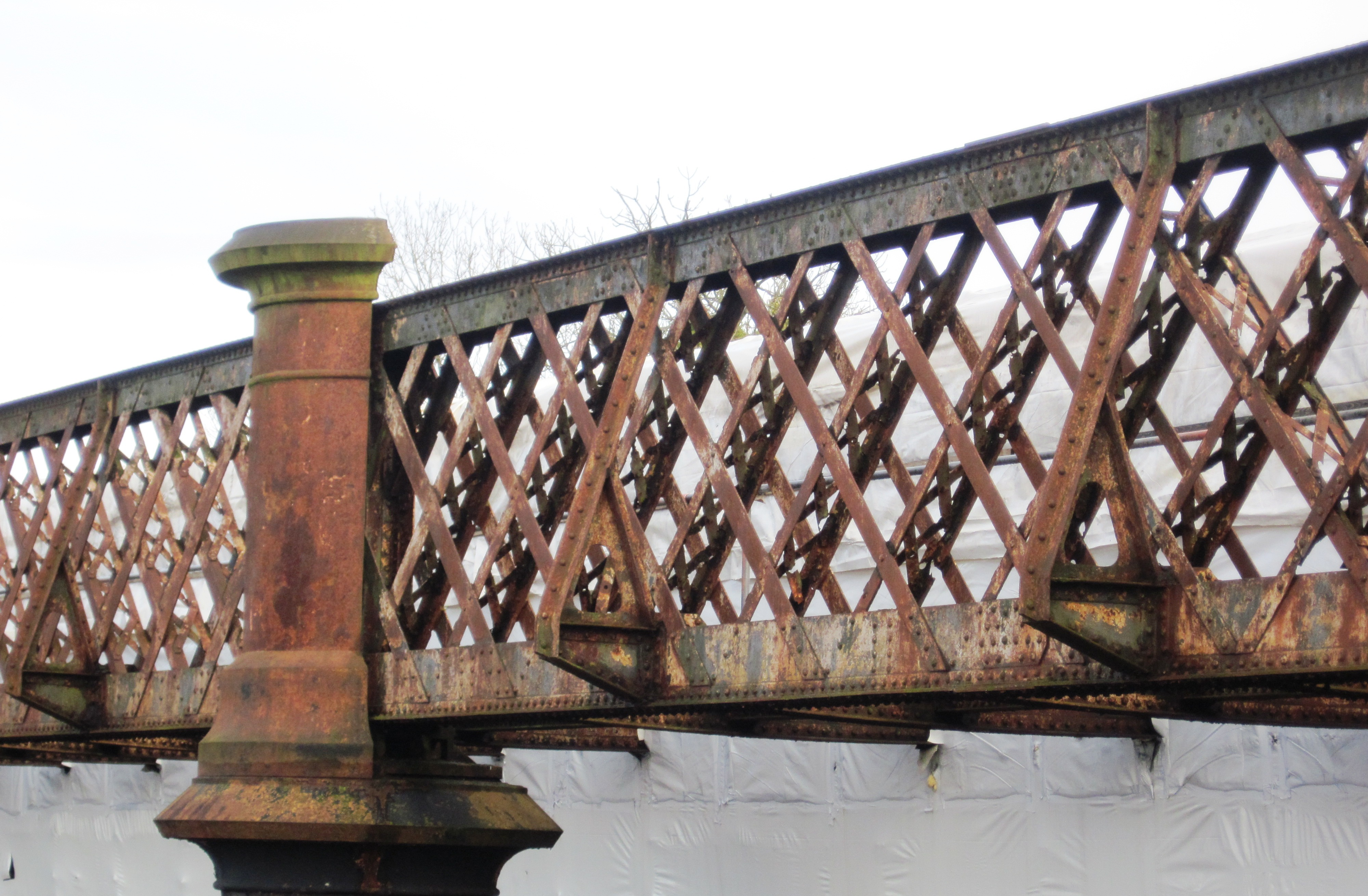
The railway bridge over the Tywi.

The road and railway bridges over the Tywi are of engineering interest. The single-arched Llandeilo Bridge was completed in 1848 and is Grade II* listed. The railway bridge, opened in 1852, is a rare survival of an early lattice truss bridge.

In the Great Storm of 1987, the floods were so severe that the River Tywi (Towy) overwhelmed the railway bridge crossing the river near Llandeilo. Four people, one of them a boy, were drowned when the 05:27 train from Swansea to Shrewsbury plunged off the damaged Glanrhyd Bridge into the river.

== Governance ==
There are two tiers of local government covering Llandeilo, at community (town) and county level: Llandeilo Fawr Town Council and Carmarthenshire County Council. The town council is based at Hengwrt (Old Courthouse) at 8 Carmarthen Street, being the former Shire Hall, built in 1802.

The Llandeilo community is bordered by the communities of: Manordeilo and Salem; Dyffryn Cennen; Llanfihangel Aberbythych; and Llangathen, all in Carmarthenshire.

=== Administrative history ===
Llandeilo historically formed part of the parish of Llandeilo Fawr, which also included extensive rural areas north and south of the town itself. In 1859, a local government district called Llandilo was established covering the central part of the parish around the town itself. Such local government districts were converted into urban districts under the Local Government Act 1894. The 1894 Act also directed that parishes could no longer straddle district boundaries, and so that part of the parish outside the urban district became a separate parish called Llandeilo Fawr Rural.

The official spelling of the name of the urban district was 'Llandilo' until 1957, when it was changed to 'Llandeilo' to better reflect modern Welsh orthography.

Llandeilo Urban District was abolished in 1974 under the Local Government Act 1972. A community called Llandeilo was created instead, covering the area of the abolished urban district. Although the community name is officially just Llandeilo, its community council calls itself Llandeilo Fawr Town Council. District-level functions passed to Dinefwr Borough Council. Carmarthenshire County Council was abolished as part of the same reforms, with county-level functions passing to the new Dyfed County Council. Dinefwr and Dyfed were both abolished in 1996 and their councils' functions passed to a re-established Carmarthenshire County Council.

The parish of Llandeilo Fawr Rural also became a community in 1974; it was abolished in 1987, being divided between the communities of Cwmamman, Manordeilo and Salem, and Dyffryn Cennen. At the same time, the community of Llandeilo was enlarged to take in the area of the abolished community of Llandyfeisant west of the town, which brought Dinefwr Castle and its grounds into the community of Llandeilo.

== Sports and recreation ==
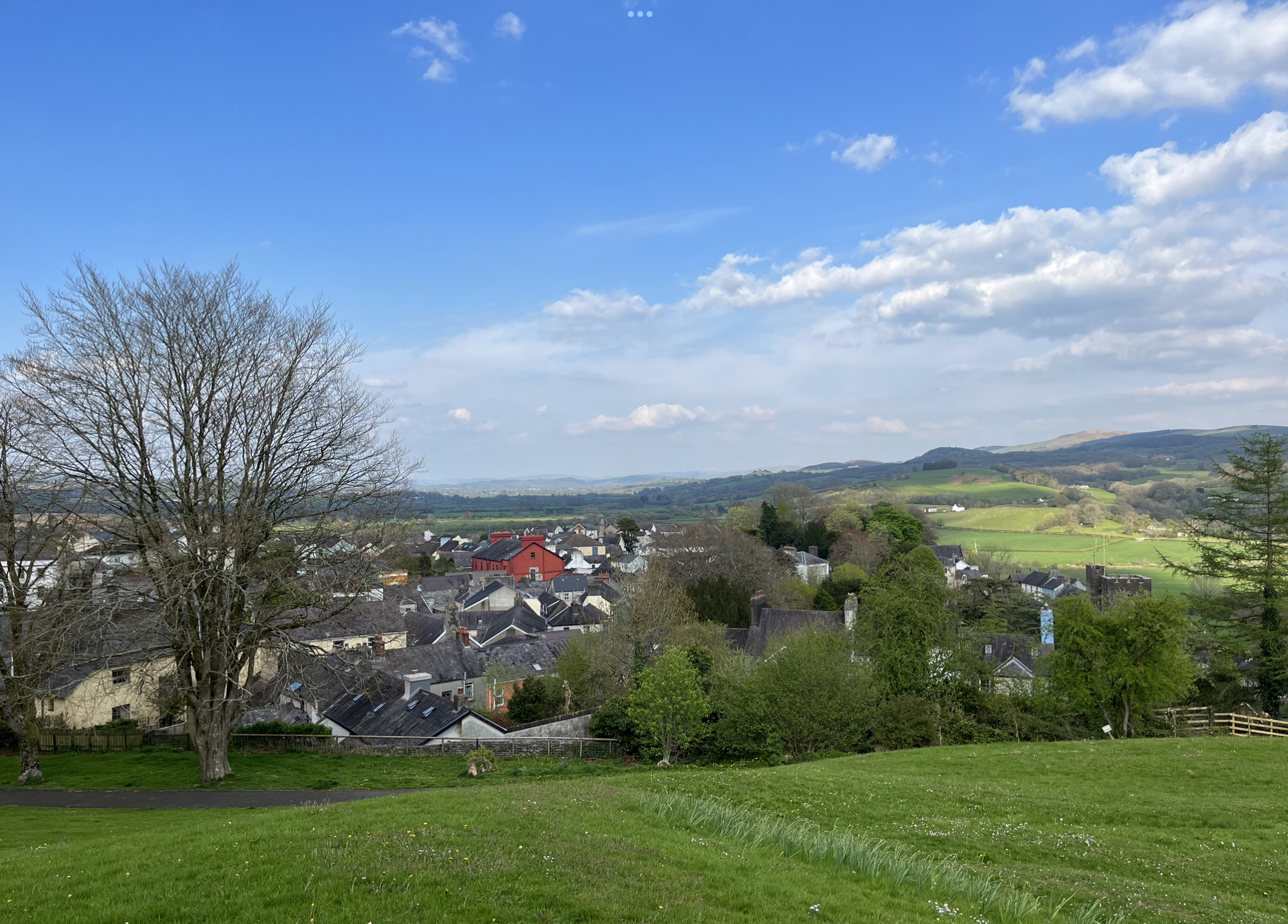
View of Llandeilo from Penlan Park

Llandeilo has two main parks: Penlan Park and Parc le Conquet. Penlan Park contains a bandstand and a woodland walk to the Dinefwr estate. Parc le Conquet is home to the town’s bowls club.

The town has several sports clubs. The local rugby union team is Llandeilo RFC, which was one of the founding clubs of the Welsh Rugby Union. The town is also home to Llandeilo Town AFC, an association football club currently playing in the Carmarthenshire League. Llandeilo Golf Club (now defunct) was founded in 1908/9. The club and course disappeared in the late 1960s. The town also has a thriving cricket club that fields a male, female and junior teams.

The town hosted a celebrity football event that took place between 2015 and 2017 to help raise funds for Tŷ Hafan children's hospice. Celebrities who took part in the event included EastEnders actor Matt Lapinskas, Former Blackburn & Scotland defender Colin Hendry, Big Brother runner-up Glyn Wise, former Wales rugby player Mark Taylor, and Everton & Wales legend Neville Southall. The event helped raise over £4,500 for the hospice.

In 2008 Llandeilo hosted the World Sheepdog Trials.

== Gallery ==
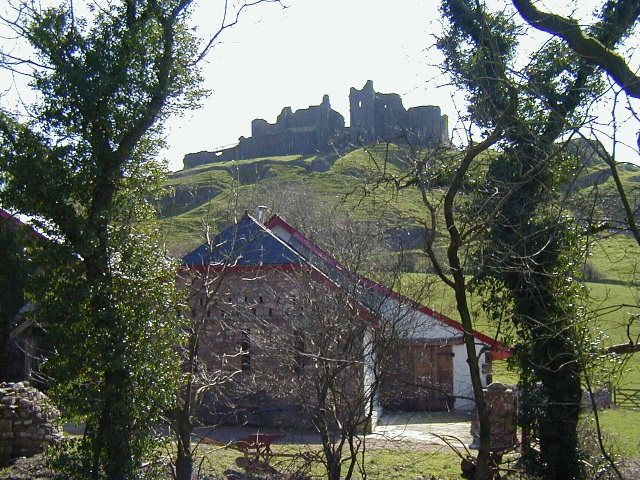
Carreg Cennen

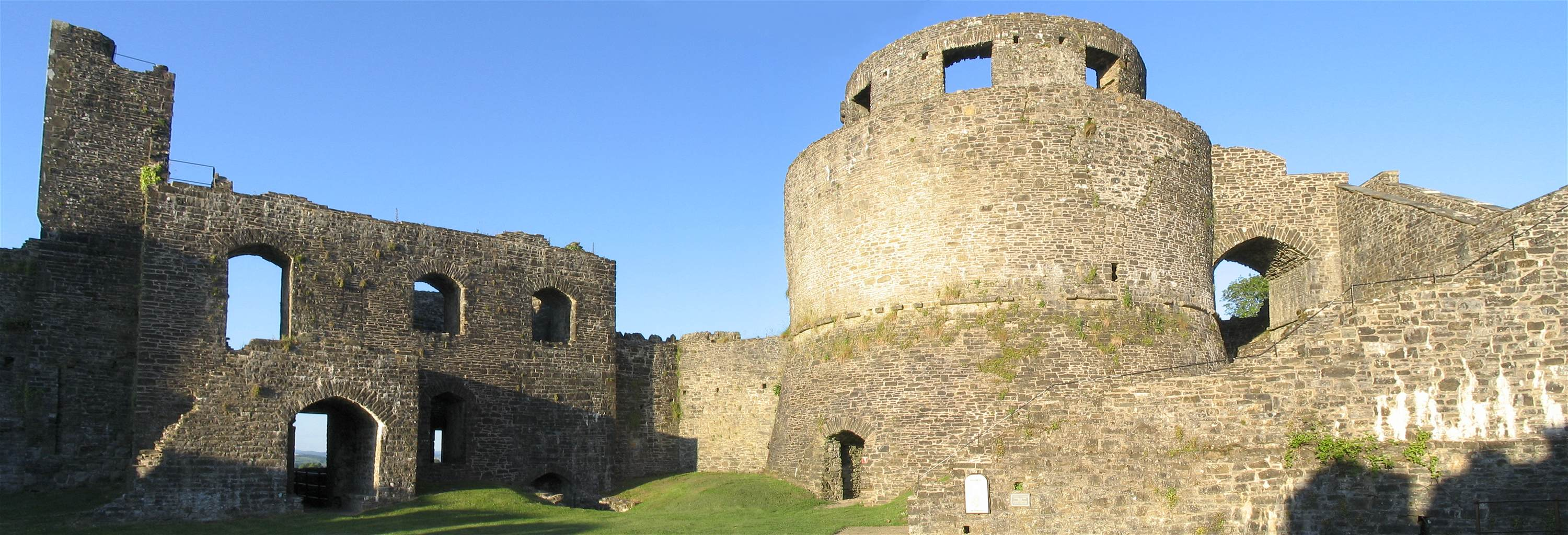
Dinefwr Castle

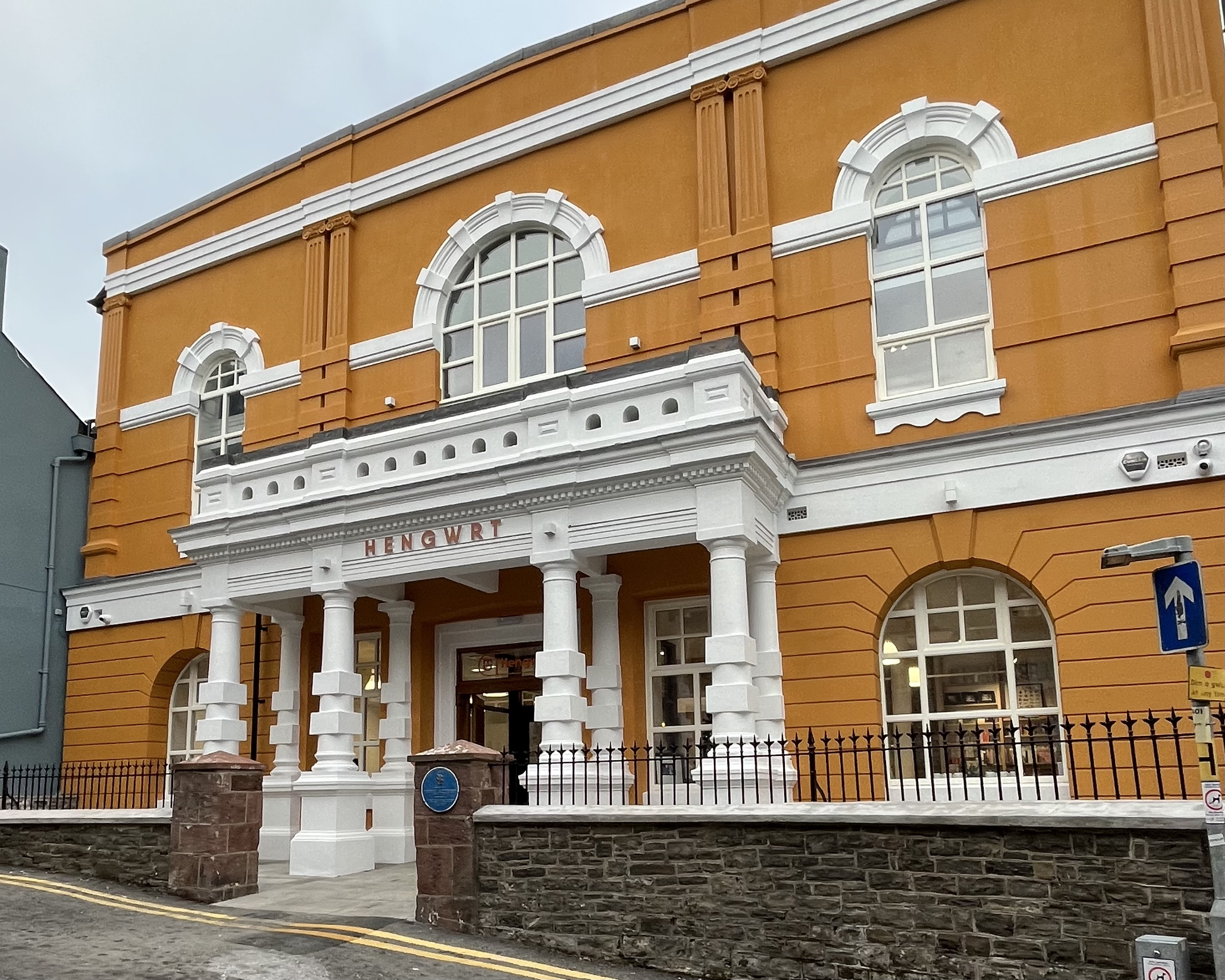
Shire Hall

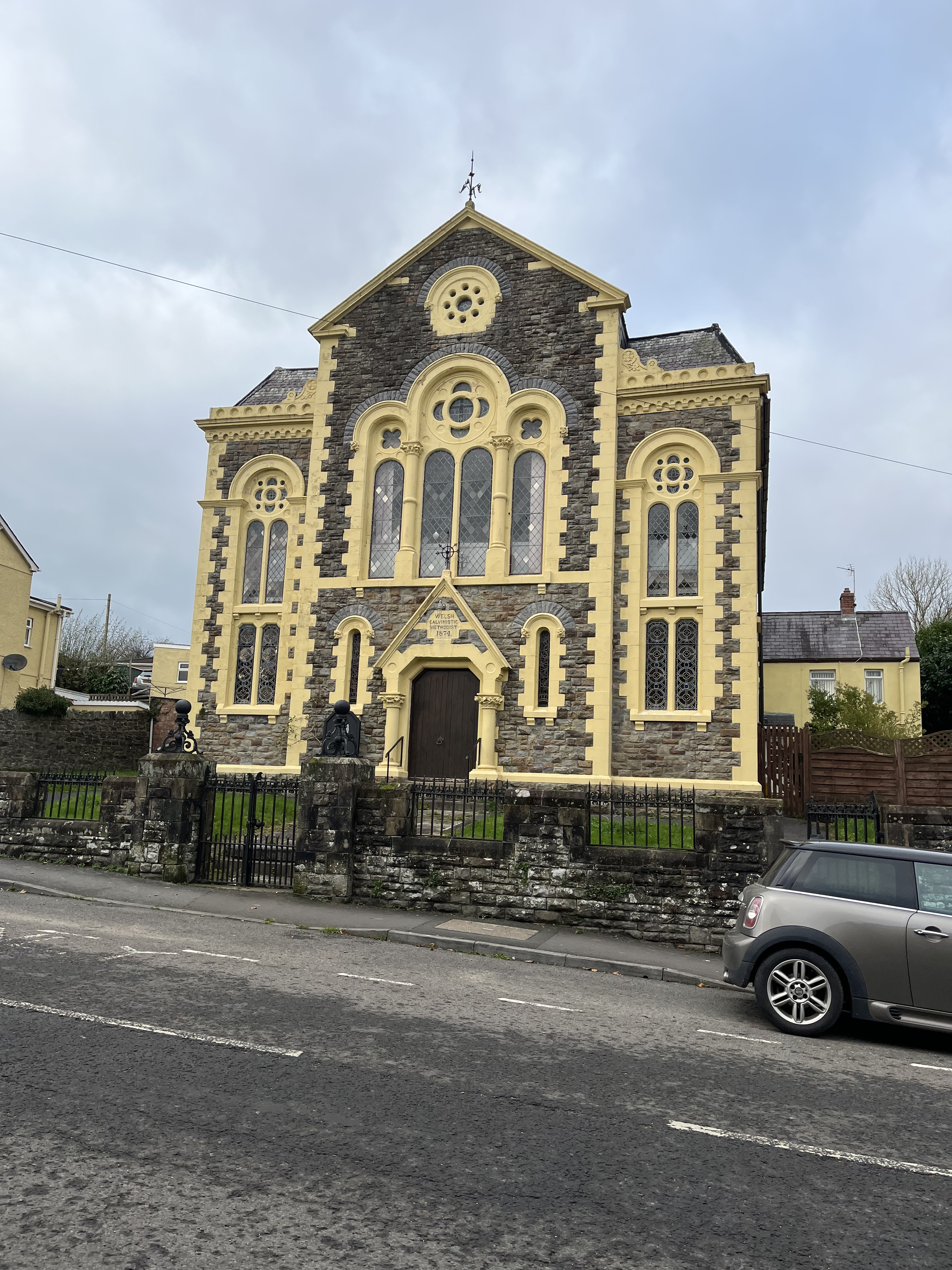
Salem Chapel

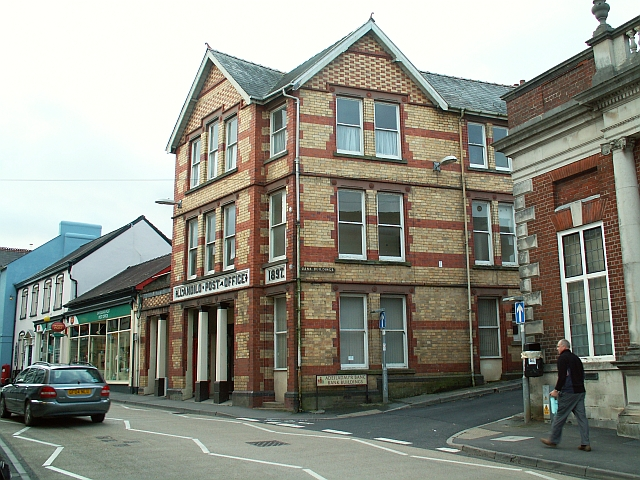
Old Post Office

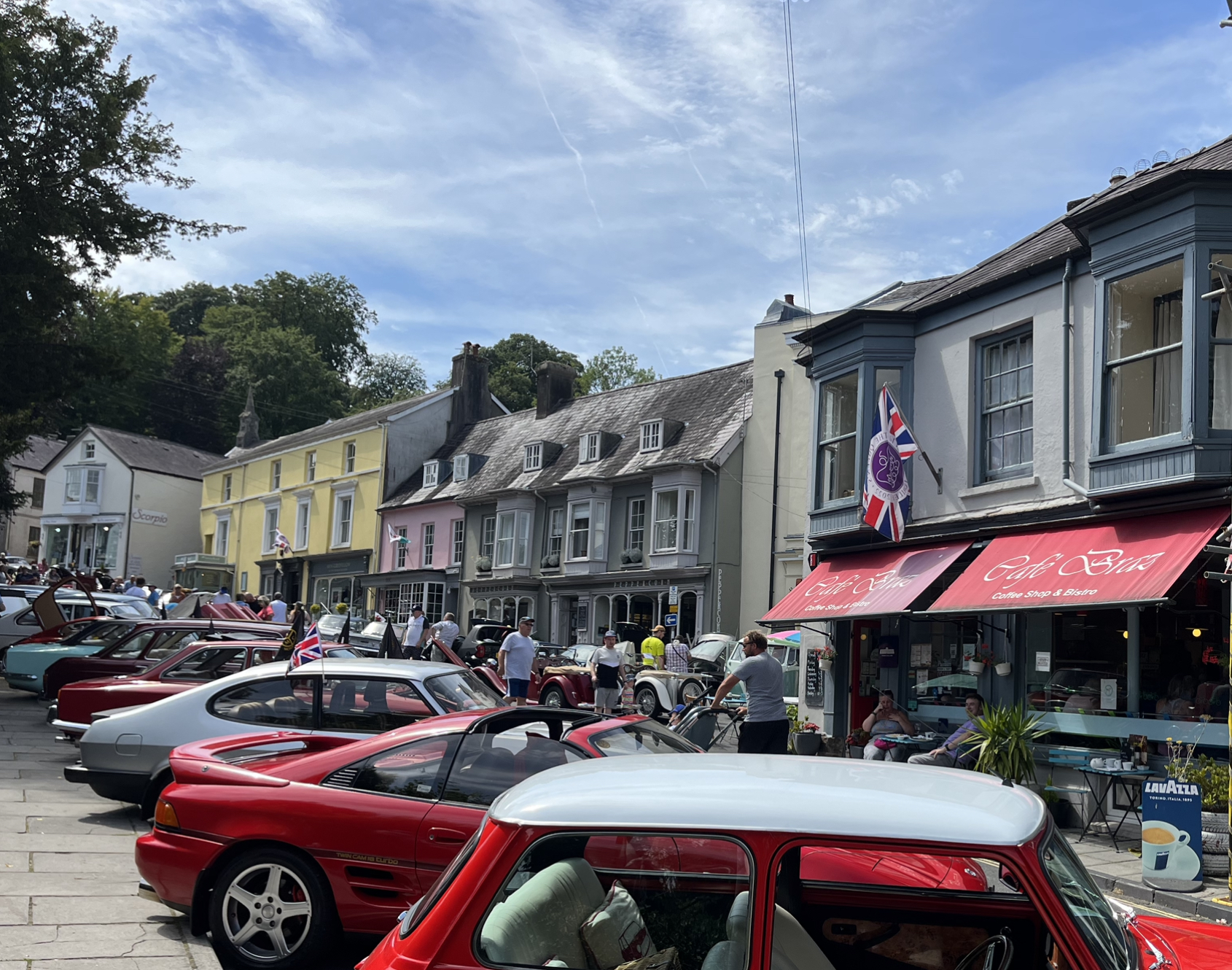
Annual car show, Llandeilo, 2022

== Culture ==
- Llandeilo hosted the National Eisteddfod of Wales in 1996, held on the meadow across the river at Ffairfach. The town sign was moved to the far side of the bridge at this time. At the Eisteddfod, the society for traditional musical instruments of Wales, Clera, was officially launched.
- Llandeilo was the birthplace of the Tomos Watkin brewery.
- At one time Llandeilo produced its own 'Llandeilo Style' banknotes, and this is recorded on a blue plaque on the wall of the building which used to house Llandovery Bank, also known as The Bank of the Black Ox.
- Llandeilo gave its name to Llandilo, New South Wales.
- Near Llandeilo, at Pant-y-llyn, near the village of Carmel, Carmarthenshire is Great Britain's only known turlough (or ephemeral lake). There is a nature reserve at the site, the Carmel National Nature Reserve.
- Llandeilo has been twinned with Le Conquet in Brittany since 1980.
- The town hosts a literary festival every spring.
- Llandeilo Fawr Festival of Music (Est 2000). Each July Llandeilo hosts an international Classical Music event.
- The Llandeilo Festival of Senses - an event involving food stalls, crafts and fireworks - takes place each year in November.
- Llandeilo was named one of the best places to live in Wales in 2017.

== Notable people ==
See Category:People from Llandeilo

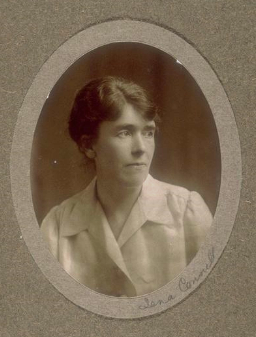
Rachel Barrett, ca.1912

- Gruffydd ap Rhys (ca.1090 – 1137), Prince of Deheubarth
- John Vaughan, 1st Earl of Carbery (ca.1574 – 1634), a Welsh courtier and politician
- William Vaughan (ca.1575–1641), writer, who promoted colonization of Newfoundland, from Golden Grove
- George Rice (1724–1779), a Welsh politician and courtier from Newton House, Llandeilo
- John Vaughan (ca.1752–1804) a Welsh landowner and politician from Golden Grove
- David Jones (1793–1873), a Welsh-Australian merchant, founder of David Jones.
- David Pugh (1806–1890), landowner and Liberal Party politician, MP 1857/1868 & 1885/1890.
- Thomas Thomas (1817–1888), a Welsh church minister and chapel architect
- Helen Prothero-Lewis (1853–1946), novelist
- Rachel Barrett (1874–1953), a teacher, Welsh suffragette and editor of The Suffragette .
- Carey Morris (1882–1968), a Welsh painter, illustrator, author and businessman
- Myfanwy Pryce (1890–1976), novelist and short story writer; author of nine published novels.
- Group Captain Hubert Jones (1890–1943), a British World War I flying ace
- Ann Pettitt (born 1947), helped establish the Greenham Common Women's Peace Camp in 1981. lived in nearby Llanpumpsaint.
- Roger Hallam (born 1966), environmental activist, co-founder of Extinction Rebellion, an organic farmer on a smallholding near Llandeilo
- Iwan Lewis (born 1988), a Welsh theatre and film actor.
- Ffion Morgan (born 2000), Welsh professional footballer.

== Llandeilo relief road ==
The amount of traffic coming into the town has caused considerable debate. In 2020, town mayor, Owen James, said, "As it stands it’s simply dangerous for people to come into Llandeilo. I know of people who don’t want to come into Llandeilo for that reason. Stand on the main road – you know exactly why we need a bypass." Work on a bypass road was scheduled to begin in 2019, directing traffic around the town. Commencement of construction work has been delayed. A freeze on construction of new roads in Wales did not include the bypass, which the Welsh Government has estimated to cost £50m.

A final decision on how best to proceed with the bypass was scheduled for the autumn of 2022, but was delayed until later in the winter.

== See also ==
- Carmarthen
- Llandovery
- List of National Trust properties in Wales
- List of lattice girder bridges in the United Kingdom
