= Four Roads Turlough =

Ecological site in County Roscommon, Ireland

Four Roads Turlough/Cloonlaughan Turlough
- (Irish: Turlach Thigh Srathra)
- Location within Ireland
- Location: County Roscommon, Ireland
- Nearest city: Roscommon
- Coordinates: 53°30′45″N 8°14′28″W
- Area: 100.18 hectares (247.6 acres)
- Governing body: National Parks and Wildlife Service

The Four Roads Turlough (Irish: Turlach Thigh Srathra) Special Area of Conservation (SAC) is a Natura 2000 site based at the village of Four Roads, Ireland, close to Roscommon town, in County Roscommon, Ireland. The Four Roads Turlough is one of a number of seasonal lakes, or turloughs, found in the karst areas of Ireland, west of the River Shannon.

== Location ==
The Four Roads Turlough SAC is located south-west of the village of Four Roads, near to Roscommon town, in County Roscommon. It is situated approximately 2.5 km (1.6 miles) from the River Suck and is in the townlands of Carroward, Cloghan and Cloonlaughnan. According to the Statutory Instrument for the site (S.I. No. 451/2017- European Union Habitats (Four Roads Turlough Special Area of Conservation 001637) Regulations 2017), the site consists of 100.18 hectares (247.6 acres) managed by the National Parks and Wildlife Service (NPWS). Several other turloughs designated as Special Areas of Conservation also occur in this karst area, such as Lough Croan Turlough, Lough Funshinagh, Lisduff Turlough and Ballinturly Turlough. The N63 Road runs near to this site, at Mount Talbot.

== SAC qualification ==
The qualifying interest by which this site is protected as an SAC is the presence of a specific priority habitat type: a turlough (habitat code 3180).

Turloughs are included as SACs because of their high nature and conservation value. They include populations of birds, plants and invertebrates which are of ecological interest. The Four Roads Turlough is one of 45 turloughs with various ecological and hydrogeological features which have been included as SACs in Ireland under the qualification of the European Habitats Directive Annex 1 priority feature of Turloughs. The majority of SAC-designated turloughs in Europe are in Ireland–45 out of the of 75 turloughs designated as SACs in Europe. Of the other turlough sites designated as SACS in Europe, 14 are in Germany, 8 are in Estonia, 3 are in Croatia and 4 are in Slovenia.

The Four Roads Turlough SAC is situated under a low bank of limestone hills. It is a shallow basin, with no permanent standing water and a predictable pattern of flooding.

The conservation objectives for this SAC are:

- To maintain or increase the area of the turlough site at approximately 72 hectares (180 acres)
- To maintain or restore the hydrogeological regime in order to support the turlough habitat
- To maintain or restore soil nutrient status regarding nitrogen and phosphorus in the soil
- To maintain active peat formation
- To restore sensitive and high conservation value vegetation
- To restore typical turlough species

The Four Roads site was proposed as a Site of Community Importance (SCI) in May 1998 and designated as a Natura 2000 site in October 2017 under the Habitats Directive. Statutory Instrument No. 451 of 2017, which established this site as an SAC (Site code: 0001637), was published on 20 October 2017.

=== Turlough water levels ===
Monitoring of groundwater and flood levels was carried out at the Four Roads Turlough SAC from 2016 to 2019 by Geological Survey Ireland, to establish baseline data for the flooding patterns on selected turloughs. Peak flood levels at this site were noted, on 18 February, 2018, to be 48.72 mAOD, have a maximum depth of 1.04 metres (3.4 feet), and cover a maximum area of 521,051 m^{2} (5,608,500 square feet). Increases in water levels occurred between September 2017 and May 2018, and again between December 2018 and May 2019, with irregular peaks within those periods. The water levels dropped between April 2017 and September 2017, and again from June 2018 to December 2018. The lowest water depth/stage was recorded at approximately 47.75 mAOD in 2017.

=== Flora ===
The flora of the turlough consist predominantly of grasses: at the eastern edge, creeping bent (Agrostis stolonifera) is common while, at the western edge sedges, such as common sedge (Carex nigra), are more common. Bottle sedge (Carex rostrata) and bogbean (Menyanthes trifoliata) are found in some low-lying areas. Thread-leaved water-crowfoot (Ranunculus trichophyllus), lesser water-plantain (Baldellia ranunculoides) and lesser marshwort (Apium inundatum or Helosciadium inundatum) occur in pools at this site. Oligotrophic fen vegetation is not found at this site, and there are very few examples of black bog-rush (Schoenus nigricans) here. The site includes some tree stumps. The soil in this SAC is peaty.

=== Birdlife ===
As well as being an SAC, this site is also a significant area for wildfowl and includes ten species of birds protected under the Birds Directive. The bird species with protected status occurring at this site are: northern pintail (Anas acuta), shoveler (Anas clypeata), teal (Anas crecca), wigeon (Anas penelope), mallard (Anas platyrhynchos), Greenland white-fronted goose (Anser albifrons flavirostris), Bewick's swan (Cygnus columbianus bewickii), curlew (Numenius arquata), golden plover (Pluvialis apricaria) and lapwing (Vanellus vanellus). The Four Roads Turlough is a significant feeding site and refuge for overwintering wildfowl. The River Suck has a specific population of 500 Greenland white-fronted goose, which frequently use the Four Roads SAC. Approximately 2,600 wildfowl and 8,000 waders also use this significant site.

The average populations of these species, counted 11 times over three seasons, from 84/85-86/87, were:

Wigeon (983), teal (870), shoveler (81), Bewick's swan (21), Greenland white-fronted goose (177, one count in 1987/88), mallard (235), pintail (40), golden plover (317), lapwing (473) and curlew (103).

A single count on January 17, 1988 measured 3,600 wigeon, 2,500 teal, 177 Greenland white-fronted goose and 2,900 lapwing. The site is also used by whooper swan, breeding lapwing, redshank and snipe. Several of these species are listed in the Red Data Book and on Annex I of the E.U. Birds Directive.

=== Other protected site designations ===
The National Parks and Wildlife Service (NPWS) has included the Four Roads Turlough site as a proposed Natural Heritage Area or pNHA. Lough Croan Turlough, Lisduff Turlough and Lough Funshinagh SACs, near this site, have also been included as pNHAs.

Under the terms of the European Union's Birds Directive (2009/147/EC), Ireland has designated a range of sites as Special Protection Areas to protect rare, vulnerable, or migrant bird species and to protect wetlands. As a valuable ornithological site, the Four Roads Turlough SAC is designated as a Special Protection Area, under the qualifying interests of:

- Golden plover (Pluvialis apricaria) [code A140]
- Greenland white-fronted goose (Anser albifrons flavirostris) [code A395]
- Wetland and Waterbirds [code A999]

Data for the current state of the sites and special conservation interests of the site are provided by the NPWS.

== History ==
At the edge of the Four Roads Turlough SAC, in the townland of Cloughan, Four Roads, are the remains of a 16th-century tower house. The National Monuments records this as monument RO044-055001- and describes it as having probably been constructed by a family called the Kellys in the 16th century. The tower has a Sheela na gig quoin-stone (monument code: RO044-055002-) on the second floor level.

== See also ==
- List of loughs in Ireland
- List of Special Areas of Conservation in the Republic of Ireland
- List of Special Protection Areas in the Republic of Ireland
