= Llandeilo Urban District =

Former district in Carmarthenshire, Wales

Llandeilo Urban District was an urban district covering the town of Llandeilo in Carmarthenshire, Wales. It had its origins in a local government district created in 1859; such local government districts were converted into urban districts in 1894. It was abolished in 1974 and replaced by Dinefwr.

== Election results ==
=== 1898 Election ===
The five members elected at the head of the poll at the initial elections now stood for re-election. One of their number, Jenkin Jones, stood down so there was no contested election.

Llandeilo Urban District 1898
Party	Candidate	Votes	%	±%
	J.W. Nicholas*	Unopposed		
	T.F. Powell	Unopposed		
	E.A. Robertsr*	Unopposed		
	John Thomas*	Unopposed		
	T.C. Thomas	Unopposed		

=== 1899 Election ===
Ten candidates contested this election, which was fought on party lines.

Llandeilo Urban District 1899
Party	Candidate	Votes	%	±%
Liberal	Evan Jones*	217		
Liberal	William Hopkin	217		
Independent	W. Jones	208		
Conservative	J.H. Hughes	190		
Independent	D. Stephens*	171		
Independent	D. Morgan	166		
Independent	D. Williams	150		
Liberal	J.W. Jones*	136		
Liberal	Thomas Jones*	126		
Independent	Joseph Rees	102		

=== 1900 Election ===
Only two sitting members sought re-election and they were returned at the head of the poll.

Llandeilo Urban District 1898
Party	Candidate	Votes	%	±%
	W. Griffiths*	267		
	T. Hopkins*	266		
	D. Morgan	253		
	Evan Thomas	207		
	H.G. Phillips	196		
	G.W. Jenkins	189		
	J. Price	138		

=== 1901 Election ===
T.F. Powell, who ran second to Nichols three years earlier. lost his seat having been indisposed in the days before the election.

Llandeilo Urban District 1901
Party	Candidate	Votes	%	±%
	J.W. Nicholas*	346		
	T.C. Thomas	309		
	E.A. Roberts*	293		
	Jenkin Jones	290		
	John Edwards	211		
	T.F. Powell*	207		
