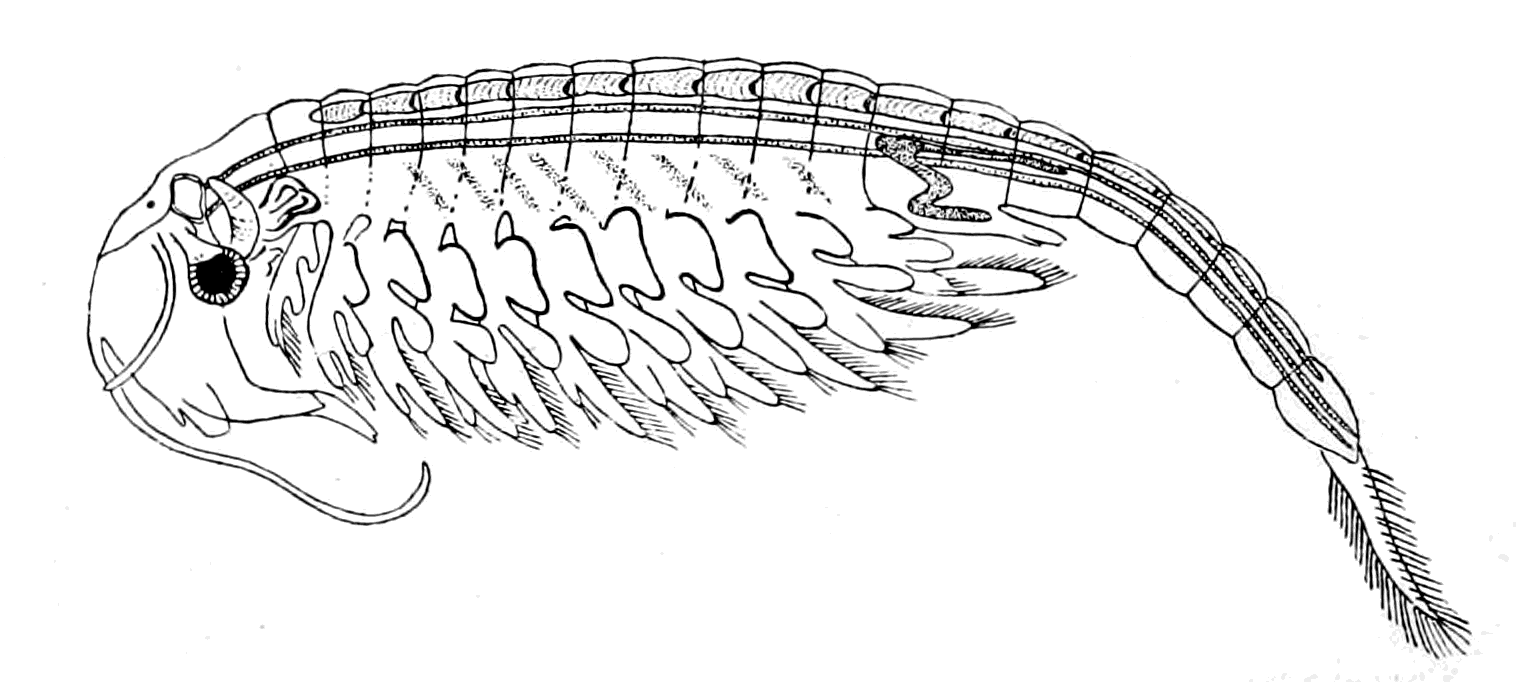
- Tanymastix stagnalis

Scientific classification
- Domain: Eukaryota
- Kingdom: Animalia
- Phylum: Arthropoda
- Class: Branchiopoda
- Order: Anostraca
- Family: Tanymastigidae
- Genus: Tanymastix; Simon, 1886

Species
- Tanymastix stagnalis (Linnaeus, 1758); Tanymastix motasi Orghidan, 1945; Tanymastix stellae Cottarelli, 1968

= Tanymastix =

Genus of small freshwater animals

Tanymastix is a genus of anostracan crustaceans, characterised by their lenticular (lentil-shaped) eggs. It comprises three species. Tanymastix stagnalis has a wide distribution across Europe and North Africa. T. motasi is endemic to Romania and North Macedonia, while T. stellae was endemic to Sardinia. The type locality of T. stellae has since been destroyed and the species is believed to be extinct; reports of T. stellae surviving on Corsica have not been confirmed, despite repeated attempts.
