= Rahasane Turlough =

Intermittent lake, County Galway, Ireland

- Turlach Ráth Asáin
- Location in Ireland
- Location: County Galway
- Coordinates: 53°13′32″N 8°47′15″W
- Type: Turlough
- Primary inflows: Dunkellin River
- Basin countries: Ireland
- Surface area: 257 ha (640 acres)

Rahasane Turlough (Irish: Turlach Ráth Asáin) is a turlough (an intermittent lake), west of Craughwell in southwest County Galway. It is the largest surviving turlough in Ireland.

A turlough is a karst lake, which has no surface outlet and is surrounded on all sides by rising land. At Rahasane the drainage has been modified in that since the 19th century the Dunkellin River has followed an artificial channel downstream of the turlough, but part of the flow continues to go underground, via a natural sink, into the underlying limestone. Rahasane consists of two basins which are connected at times of flood but separated as the waters decline. It covers 257 hectares (640 acres) at an altitude of 10–30 metres (30–100 ft) above sea level. The site comprises marshes, and seasonally flooded wet meadows, with limestone outcrops and scrub at its margins. In the summer the lake empties and the basin is grazed by cattle, horses and sheep.

The southern basin is the more impressive feature, with high rocky sides above an undulating base, strewn with boulders. There is a low hill on the south side of the main basin, and another on the northeast, near Shanbally Castle.

== Ecology ==
It has been designated a Special Protection Area and a Special Area of Conservation. It is an important location for migrating birds, and wintering ground for the Greenland white-fronted goose. It is one of the few known breeding grounds in Ireland of the Eurasian wigeon. The garganey can be seen on occasion. It is a very good place to spot accidental visitors from America, such as the American wigeon, and from Europe, such as the black tern.

The fairy shrimp Tanymastix stagnalis was first recorded in Ireland from the southern basin at Rahasane.
