= Carey Morris =

British artist (1882–1968)

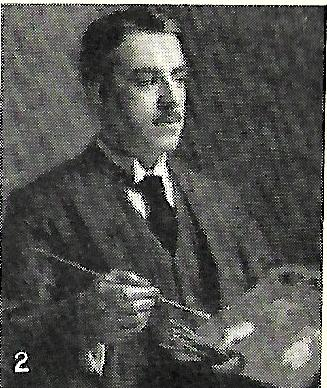
- Born: 17 May 1882; Llandeilo, Carmarthenshire
- Died: 17 November 1968 (aged 86)
- Education: Forbes School of Painting, Slade School of Art
- Known for: Painter and illustrator
- Spouse: Jesse Phillips Morris

Carey Morris (17 May 1882 – 17 November 1968) was a Welsh painter, illustrator, author and businessman born in Llandeilo, Carmarthenshire.

He was related to the Welsh poet Sir Lewis Morris.

== Personal life ==
Carey Morris was the son of Benjamin and Elizabeth Boynes Morris who ran a house painter and decorator's business in Llandeilo. The family lived in a house on Prospect Place, which now forms part of Rhosmaen Street.

He married Jessie Phillips, who was the author of children's books, which he illustrated, and a journalist.

== Education ==
Morris attended the National School and Llandeilo County School. Then he began his artistic studies at the Forbes School of Painting from 1902 to 1907. Two years after completing his studies at Forbes he began his studies at the Slade School of Art. At Slade, Professor Henry Tonks was a physician who imparted the knowledge of anatomy that created a three-dimensional quality to Morris' work. It was said of Honk that: He also studied at the Newlyn School in Cornwall, where he included Cornish people, such as Saunders the Postman, and took advantage of the Cornish landscape and light when creating his works.

== Career and war years ==
After completing his studies in Newlyn, he returned to London and maintained a studio on Cheyne Walk, Chelsea. Two members of the Edwards family from his hometown were featured in 1910 in The Welsh Weavers, which was published in the United States and the United Kingdom. His friends and acquaintances included William Orpen, John Nash, Ethelbert White, Elizabeth and Stanhope Forbes, Frank Brangwyn, Evan Walters, Sir George Clausen and Sir Herbert Herkomer.

During the First World War, he enlisted in the South Wales Borderers. He was on the Isle of Wight serving with the Isle of Wight Rifles from 1915 to 1917 and found some time during the war to paint. In the trenches of Flanders he suffered from poison gas which left him with lifelong health issues. He spent twelve months in hospitals in the Isle of Wight and Liverpool.

After the war Morris had a studio in Chelsea and the couple lived in London. Although Morris concentrated primarily on portraits, he also worked as an illustrator for his wife and other authors.

During the 1920s, Morris was a director of the National Eisteddfod and was acquainted with members of the Welsh squirearchy, including Sir Joseph Bradney. In Llandeilo he worked for the family business.

== Works ==
- Boesinghe Chateau, Yser Canal, January 1917
- Cefn Bryn, Gower, from Kilvrough
- Harbour Scene
- Landscape in Carmarthenshire
- Quayside
- Ships
- The Last Farm in England, exhibited at the Royal Academy
- The Welsh Weavers, about 1910
- Three Cliffs Bay Gower, Morning
- Woman
- Woman at the Well

Portraits

- Colonel Delmé William Campbell Davies-Evans (1873–1953)
- Eirwen Jones
- John Johnes of Dolaucothi (1884–1902)
- Miss Mary Eirwen Jones (1911–1996)
- Mrs Mary J. Jones
- Rutland Boughton (1878–1960)
- Sir Joseph Bradney (1859–1933)
- Sir Lewis Morris (1833–1907)
- Sir Vincent Evans (1851–1934)

== Exhibitions ==
His work was exhibited at:

- Birmingham
- Glasgow Institute of Fine Arts
- Liverpool
- London Salon
- Royal Academy
- Royal Society of Portrait Painters

== Publications ==
His publications included:

- Personality as a Force in Art
- Art and Religion in Wales
- Craftsmanship Should Not Be Allowed to Die
