= Levally Lough, County Galway =

Lake in County Galway, Ireland

Levally Lough
- Loch an Leathbhaile (Irish)
- Location in Ireland
- Location: County Galway
- Coordinates: 53.53°N 8.71°W
- Primary inflows: One stream on the north-east side
- Basin countries: Ireland
- Surface area: 48.3 ha (0.19 sq mi)

Levally Lough (Irish: Loch an Leathbhaile) is a turlough (periodically dry lake) in County Galway, Ireland, about 9 km (6 mi) east of Tuam.

== Geology ==
Levally Lough is in an area of limestone rock. The lake has formed since the last glacial period, about 11,000 years ago.

== Hydrology ==
Levally Lough was identified as a turlough in 2018, when the lake emptied entirely. Its outflow has not yet been fully ascertained. The lake is part of a system of turloughs that includes Glenamaddy Turlough. Levally Lough empties less frequently than other turloughs and its longer cycle is second only to that of Lough Funshinagh in County Roscommon.

== Natural history ==
Levally Lough is part of the Levally Lough Special Area of Conservation (SAC), selected as a turlough habitat. The SAC area is 58 hectares (0.22 sq mi), of which 48.3 ha (0.19 sq mi) is the turlough at normal maximum area.

A number of duck species winter at the lake including pochard, teal, wigeon and tufted duck. Wader bird species include lapwing and curlew. Other bird species found at the lake include moorhen and black-headed gull.

The lake's southern shore is a peaty grassland with flora including creeping willow, fool's watercress and black bog-rush. Plants at other parts of the lake include amphibious bistort and tufted vetch.

== See also ==
- List of loughs of Ireland
- List of Special Areas of Conservation in the Republic of Ireland
