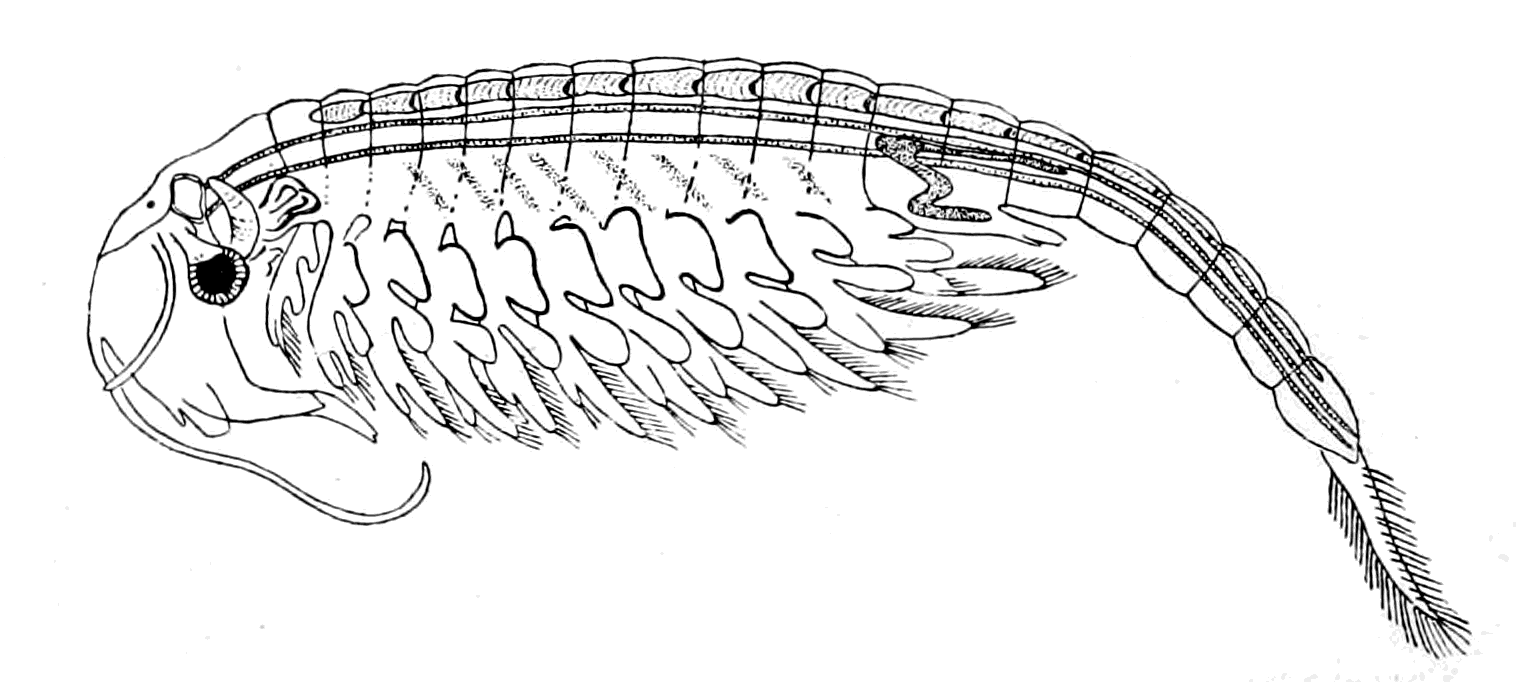
- Tanymastix stagnalis

Scientific classification
- Domain: Eukaryota
- Kingdom: Animalia
- Phylum: Arthropoda
- Class: Branchiopoda
- Order: Anostraca
- Suborder: Anostracina
- Family: Tanymastigidae; Weekers et al., 2002

Synonyms
- Tanymastigiidae Weekers et al., 2002 (orth. error)

= Tanymastigidae =

Family of small freshwater animals

Tanymastigidae is a family of fairy shrimp. It contains two genera:

- Tanymastigites Brtek, 1972
- Tanymastix Simon, 1886
