= Lough Funshinagh =

Ecological site in County Roscommon, Ireland

- Loch Fuinseann (Irish)
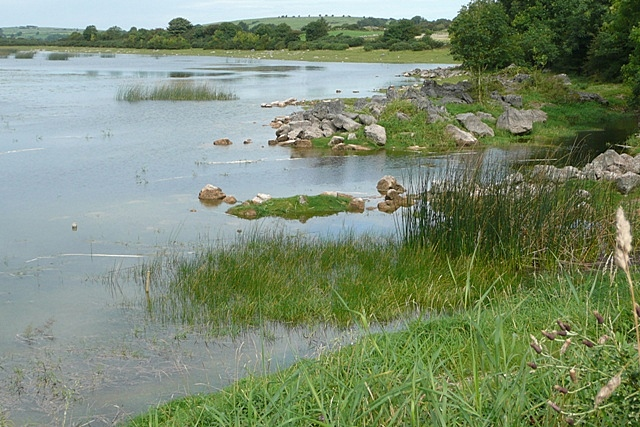

- Location within Ireland
- Location: County Roscommon, Ireland
- Coordinates: 53.509832°N 8.098922°W
- Basin countries: Ireland
- Surface area: 3.8 km^{2} (1.5 sq mi)
- Surface elevation: 67 m (220 ft)
- Islands: Red Island, Inchnadarra, Inchihiceley

Lough Funshinagh (Irish: Loch Fuinseann, meaning 'lake of the ash tree') is a lake and Special Area of Conservation (or SAC) in County Roscommon, Ireland, found to the west of Lough Ree. It has been called Ireland's amazing disappearing lake, due to the way it empties quickly - in as little as two days - and unpredictably, sometimes killing thousands of fish. Lough Funshinagh is one of a number of seasonal lakes, or turlough, found in the karst areas of Ireland, west of the River Shannon.

The qualifying interests by which it is protected as an SAC are the presence of two specific habitat types:

- Turloughs
- Rivers with muddy banks with Chenopodion rubri p.p. and Bidention p.p. vegetation.

== Location ==
The Lough Funshinagh SAC is located approximately 12 km from Athlone, County Roscommon and County Westmeath, in the townlands of Ballagh (Electoral District: Carnagh), Carrick (Electoral district: Rockhill), Carrickbeg (Electoral District: Rockhill), Inchiroe and Gortfree, Kildurney, Lisfelim, Lysterfield and Rahara. Schedule 1 of the Statutory Instrument for this SAC (S.I. No. 76/2018) identifies it as encompassing an area of 430.52 hectares.

== SAC qualification ==
The Lough Funshinagh site was proposed as a Site of Community Importance (SCI) in November 1997 and designated as a Natura 2000 site in May 2019 under the Habitats Directive. Statutory Instrument No. 211 of 2019, establishing the site as an SAC (Site code: 000611), was passed in 2019. According to the NPWS site synopsis, the features which qualify this site for an SAC designation are the presence of two specific protected habitat types, those of

- Turloughs [Natura 2000 code 3180] (Priority Habitat on Annex I of the E.U. Habitats Directive)
- Rivers with muddy banks with Chenopodion rubri p.p. and Bidention p.p. vegetation [Natura 2000 code 3270]

The Biodiversity Information System for Europe (BISE) web page for the site notes the sizes of the two protected habitats as: Turloughs: 378.30 ha (3.7830 km²) and Rivers with muddy banks with Chenopodion rubri p.p. and Bidention p.p. vegetation: 33.00 ha (0.3300 km²). The BISE webpage for the Lough Funshinagh site notes 13 EU Protected Species occurring at this location – all 13 are bird species.

=== Other protected status qualifications ===
The National Parks and Wildlife Service (NPWS) has included an area of 480.96 hectares at the Lough Funshinagh site as a proposed Natural Heritage Area or pNHA. Very close to this site, Lough Croan Turlough and Four Roads Turlough SACs have also been included as pNHAs.

The site at Lough Funshinagh is a County Geological Site (site code: RO018) and is recommended for a Geological Heritage Area.

== Hydrogeology ==
The significant ecological features of the Lough Funshinagh site are described in the National Parks and Wildlife Service site synopsis for the site. In this document, the lake is defined as a turlough.

“Lough Funshinagh is located approximately 12 km north-west of Athlone, in Co. Roscommon. The lake, which is underlain by Carboniferous limestone, is classified as a turlough because it fluctuates to a significant extent every year and occasionally dries out entirely (approximately two to three times every ten years. In most years, however, an extensive area of water persists.”

Data on groundwater levels are available from the Groundwater Level Data Viewer by Geological Survey Ireland. Data recorded for groundwater levels at the site since August 2016 indicate that peaks in water levels typically occur in Spring (March-April) and levels tend to decrease in the Summer and Autumn.

The area at Lough Funshinagh is part of the ‘Athlone chain’ of eskers in the System of Clara, as described in the 1876 Scientific transactions of the Royal Dublin Society. The site synopsis notes that this lake is fed by springs and a small catchment lying to the west. Its trophic state is described as mesotrophic (with an intermediate level of productivity and nutrients) and includes some marl deposition (calcium carbonate deposits).

While the size of the Special Area of Conservation is set, the size of the turlough varies. The hydrogeology of this turlough site results in the typical periodic increases and decreases in turlough size and volume, which have been associated with significant drainage and flooding events. The magnitude of these fluctuations is affected by drainage rates through the karstic landscape, and can be affected by weather events.

“While Lough Funshinagh is designated as a turlough due to its characteristic fluctuating water levels, it is extremely slow to drain and seldomly empties completely. The characteristic slow response of Funshinagh means that, unlike other turloughs in Ireland, it does not get the opportunity to reset it’s flood pattern each year. This leaves it particularly vulnerable to weather events as their impacts can carry over from one year to the next.”

== Significant drainage events ==
Several significant reductions in size have been described, including in 1955, 1984 and 1996. The lake emptied in effect completely in 1996 – water levels began to drop after 19 August 1996 and by 1 September 1996, there was only approximately 30 cm water remaining in the southern end of the lake, and a few days later, only some pools of water remained, with large numbers of fish stranded.

Geological Survey Ireland's County Roscommon Geological Site Report states that the terrain of the lake is karstic in nature, underlaid by Carboniferous limestone bedrock. The report suggests that there may exist thin clay or marl deposits under the bed of the lake. The report also states that the lake bed appears to contain one or more swallow holes. These, it is suggested, are usually blocked by an impermeable layer (for example, a clay layer). The breaking of this ‘seal’ on the swallow hole can lead to rapid draining of the lake. This process will result in a ‘gradual slumping inwards of impermeable material’, blocking the swallow hole again. However, it was noted by Drew and Burke in a Geological Survey Ireland publication in 1996 that:

"It does not seem as though a plug hole in the sink ruptured as Coleman (op cit.) suggests happens; neither was the late summer especially dry. However, further west in north-east and south Galway water levels in several lakes-cum-turloughs were reported to have fallen to the lowest levels on record during the late summer - significantly lower than those achieved in the preceding exceptionally dry summer of 1995."

Drew and Burke note that while it had been believed that the turlough drained to Lough Ree, that this would be unlikely as there occurs a limestone ridge between Lough Funshinagh and Lough Ree, which has an elevation approximately 70 metres higher than the lake, and that a direct underground flow route through the ridge is ‘unlikely’. A water tracing experiment found there to be a connection between the sink at Lough Funshinagh and the Spring at Atteagh Corn Mill, with a discharge of approximately 10 l/sec, a minimum flow rate of 70 metres per hour and a difference in height between input and output sites of 15 metres.

== Significant flood events ==
Significant flooding events have been recorded in the vicinity of the Lough Funshinagh site, including in the winter of 2015/2016, where the waters reached a level of 68.25 above ordnance datum, or mOD, to a level of 2 metres above its typical winter level (an increase in water volume from 5 up to 14 million m³). This was ascribed to significantly high rainfall levels over a six-month period, particularly over a period from early November 2015 to early January 2016. The Met Eireann records show that this was the highest cumulative rainfall at the nearby village of Lecarrow since records began in February 1952. This was ascribed to multiannual flood patterns (rather than seasonal flood patterns). In April 2024, record high flood levels of 69.38 meters above sea level were recorded at the lake.

=== 2015/2016 floods ===
It has been hypothesized that prior to 2016 the lake drained through a swallow hole, now blocked, which caused the lake to double its surface area.

The flooding at Lough Funshinagh in 2015-2016 was at the time “the highest in living memory”, resulting in an area of 4.6 km^2. The peak volume at the time was over 16 x 10^6 m3. The water levels subsided only slowly at the time, at only a few centimetres per week, and at six months after the flood event, they were noted to be above the levels of the previous record flood of 2009-2010. Groundwater/flood levels have been monitored at Lough Funshinagh since July 2016 by Geological Survey Ireland.

=== 2021/2022 floods ===
Geological Survey Ireland note that in spring 2020, water levels reached approximately 68.26 mAOD (the ‘ordnance datum’ relative to average sea level) and in spring 2021, they reached approximately 69.03 mAOD. After the 2015-2016 floods, an analysis of the hydrological system at Lough Funshinagh was carried out to identify potential solutions to the flooding issue, including using culverts or overflow pipes, and this analysis was published in 2021. In February 2021, Roscommon County Council agreed "that an overflow pipe be installed in Lough Funshinagh and that the planning application be fast tracked to commence the project as soon as possible."

In March 2022 plans to drain the lake by constructing a 2.5-mile (4 km) pipeline to Lough Ree were halted when the Friends of the Irish Environment obtained an injunction, halting the work on the grounds that no environmental impact assessment had been carried out before commencing works to this SAC (required legally under the EU Habitats Directive), to assess impacts to the Lough and to the area to which the water would be relocated. While Roscommon Council had committed €72,000 in 2018 for a study at "Lough Funshinagh and Environs – Ballagh, Lisfelm, Srahauns, Lysterfield", the Lough Funshinagh Flood Relief Scheme remains "under consideration". It is noted on the FloodInfo website that:

"Roscommon County Council are leading the response to the flooding risk at Lough Funshinagh. Following a High Court Order in March 2022 remediation works in line with the Reinstatement Plan for Lough Funshinagh were undertaken and completed. Roscommon County Council, that is leading the project, has established an Expert Working Group to support and help to identify the pathway to finding a means of progressing a viable solution. The initial work of the Expert Group is to scope out the requirements to undertake the necessary surveys and investigations. This work is being informed by a review, by the OPW, of the evidence and research on the nature and functioning of Lough Funshinagh."

It was noted in 2022 that since the 2016 flood there has been a decline in the number of Bewick’s swans, whooper swans and curlews found in the area surrounding the lake.

=== 2023/2024 floods ===
Geological Survey Ireland note that in spring 2024, the water levels monitored at Lough Funshinagh reached over 69 mAOD. The Geological Survey Ireland Groundwater Level Data Monitor records indicate that the water levels peaked at 69.38 mAOD in April 2024. By mid-June 2024, levels had decreased to the level of the previous peak reached in April 2021 (69.03 mAOD), and continued to decrease slowly.

The flooding event of 2024 caused disruption to houses, farms and roads in the area.

In September 2024, an application for planning permission to pump water from Lough Funshinagh to the Cross River Carrick townland in County Roscommon was submitted to An Bord Pleanála, the Irish planning authority. The purpose of this action is to act as an interim flood relief system, and is expected to be in place for up to 24 months. On 10 January 2025, it was announced that Roscommon County Council’s application for a 3 km temporary underground overflow pipeline to pump water from Lough Funshinagh to the Cross River was granted, with some conditions attached. This temporary scheme is expected to be implemented by April 2025, and will be in effect for two years. Planning permission will also be sought for a permanent solution to the flooding at the turlough site in 2025. The potential water levels for the area were assessed by the Geological Survey of Ireland in 2024, and these calculations give a 95% probability that water levels will reach approximately 68.15 m in 2025, and a 5% probability that level will rise to approximately 70m.

== Key Flora and Fauna ==
=== Flora ===
One of the features qualifying this site for SAC status includes specific vegetation – this is the ‘rivers with muddy banks with Chenopodion rubri p.p. and Bidention p.p. vegetation’ habitat, which includes Habitats Directive Annex I species. Species of Chara (stoneworts) occur in marl deposits. At the edges of the lake, wet grassland occurs, including Creeping Bent (Agrostis stolonifera), Marsh Pennywort (Hydrocotyle vulgaris) and Silverweed (Potentilla anserina). Fontinalis antipyretica The plants at this Special Area of Conservation turlough include typical turlough flora such as Common Club-rush (Scirpus lacustris), Tufted sedge (Carex elata), Slender Sedge (Carex lasiocarpa), Bottle Sedge (Carex rostrata), Common Reed (Phragmites australis), as well as semi-aquatic plants such as Sharp-flowered Rush (Juncus acutiflorus), Carnation Sedge (Carex panicea), Common Sedge (Carex nigra), Water Spearwort (Ranunculus flammula), Water Mint (Mentha aquatica), Marsh Ragwort (Senecio aquaticus), Common Marsh-bedstraw (Galium palustre) and Tufted Forget-me-not (Myosotis laxa). Also found at the site are Various-leaved Pondweed (Potamogeton gramineus), Amphibious Bistort (Polygonum amphibium), and Marsh Cudweed (Gnaphalium uliginosum). The moss Fontinalis antipyretica occurs here, as does the rare Northern Yellow-cress (Rorippa islandica), a species listed in the Irish Red Data Book.

=== Birds ===
Lough Funshinagh is designated as one of the 68 Irish Wildfowl Sanctuaries (including four in County Roscommon), which are excluded from the Open Season Order and where game bird shooting is forbidden (site code: Code WFS-46).

This is a significant Irish site for ornithology. The 13 EU Protected species occurring at this site (as noted on the BISE webpage for the site) include: shoveler (Anas clypeata), teal (Anas crecca), wigeon (Anas penelope), mallard (Anas platyrhynchos), white-fronted goose (Greenland subspecies) (Anser albifrons flavirostris), pochard (Aythya ferina), tufted duck (Aythya fuligula), whooper swan (‘’Cygnus cygnus’’), coot (Fulica atra), curlew (Numenius arquata), golden plover (Pluvialis apricaria), black-necked grebe (Podiceps nigricollis), and lapwing (Vanellus vanellus). The NPWS site synopsis also notes the presence of Bewick's swan (Cygnus bewickii), gadwall and pintail, and mentions that the Greenland White-Fronted Geese occurring here are the River Suck flock of this species.

After five black-necked grebe had been found in Ireland in 1918 by J. ffolliott Darling, a large colony of this species was discovered by C.V. Stoney and G.R. Humphreys in 1929 at Lough Funshinagh. Approximately 250 breeding pairs occurred at the site in 1930 and 155 nests were recorded there in 1932. Numbers of this species were significantly reduced after permanent drainage of the site increased with the development of the Shannon hydroelectric scheme.

== Conservation objectives ==
The NPWS conservation objectives for the two types of habitat at the Lough Funshinagh site include the maintenance of favourable conservation conditions, such as maintenance of the habitat area and distribution, maintenance of an appropriate natural hydrological regime necessary to support the natural structure and functioning of the habitat, maintenance of soil type, nutrient status, physical structure, water quality and vegetation composition.

=== Threats ===
Threats to the ecology of the site come from drainage and from agricultural intensification, including use of fertiliser leading to lake eutrophication. At the time of the compilation of the site conservation objectives in 2018, it was noted that the lake was clear, and that attempts at drainage of the site had not resulted in significant structural damage to the site.

The statutory instrument specifies a list of 31 actions which require the permission of the Minister before they may be carried out at the site, including, for example, stocking or re-stocking with fish, changing of agricultural use from hay meadow to any other use, works on, or alterations to, the banks, bed or flow of a drain, watercourse or waterbody, drainage works including digging, deepening, widening or blocking a drain, watercourse or waterbody or water abstraction, sinking of boreholes and wells.

== History ==
According to records from the Dúchas School’s Collection, there had been a castle at Ballagh Island at Lough Funshinagh, which belonged to the O’Kelly family. These records note that the castle had been knocked down and destroyed, leaving no trace.

The eastern side of the lakes includes some islands, and the 1886 work The Lake Dwellings of Ireland: Or, Ancient Lacustrine Habitations of Erin, Commonly Called Crannogs notes that there had been a crannóg on Lough Funshinagh.

== See also ==
- List of loughs in Ireland
- List of Special Areas of Conservation in the Republic of Ireland
