= St Teilo's Church, Llantilio Pertholey =

Church of St Teilo, Llantilio Pertholey
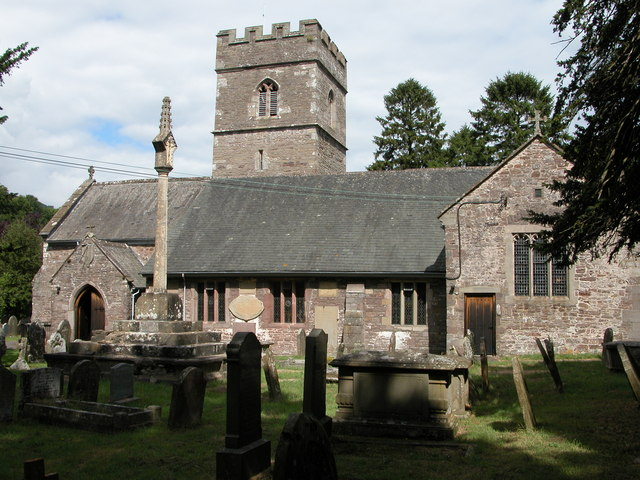
- Church of St Teilo
- Church of St Teilo, Llantilio Pertholey
- 51.8414°N 3.0008°W
- Location: Llantilio Pertholey, Monmouthshire
- Country: Wales
- Denomination: Church in Wales

History
- Status: Grade I listed

Architecture
- Years built: 13th century

Administration
- Diocese: Monmouth

Clergy
- Priest: Father Julian Gray

The Church of St Teilo is the parish church of Llantilio Pertholey, Monmouthshire, Wales. "An unusually large and varied church", it is a Grade I listed building as of 1 September 1956

== History and architecture ==
The church is thirteenth century in origin with significant additions in the sixteenth century, a major restoration in 1890 and further minor restoration in the twentieth century. The tower is of the early fourteenth century and the aisle of slightly later date. Around the chancel are three chantry chapels, the church's "most memorable" features. The bell tower holds six bells, dating from the seventeenth century.
