= St Teilo's Church, Llandeilo =

Church in Carmarthenshire, Wales

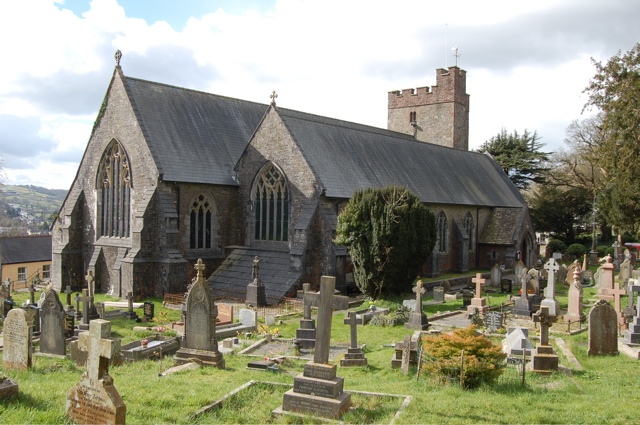

- Location in Carmarthenshire
- 51.8818°N 3.9929°W
- Location: Church Street, Llandeilo
- Country: Wales
- Denomination: Anglican

History
- Founded: Medieval

Architecture
- Heritage designation: Grade II
- Designated: 14 March 1966
- Architectural type: Church

St Teilo's Church is an Anglican parish church in the town of Llandeilo, Carmarthenshire, Wales. The fabric of the building has medieval origins but stands on a much older site and was rebuilt in the early eighteenth century. It was designated as a Grade II listed building on 14 March 1966

== The church ==
This large church is located in Church Street where it is conspicuous, with a very large churchyard. As a Christian centre, Llandeilo dates back to the sixth century. Very little is known about Saint Teilo, to whom the church is dedicated, but he seems to have travelled around Wales because there are several other churches dedicated to him in other places. He is believed to have made Llandeilo his main base and be buried there, although Llandaff Cathedral has disputed this. There is a legend that after his death, his body was placed in Llandeilo church and three clergy from different churches prayed that he could be buried in their churches (Llandeilo, Llandaff and his birthplace Penally). In the morning, three bodies were miraculously found, so that an authentic body could be buried at each church.

The church was designated as a Grade II listed building on 14 March 1966, being listed because it is a fine example of a church of its period, and has historic associations. The Royal Commission on the Ancient and Historical Monuments of Wales curates the archaeological, architectural and historic records for this church. These include digital photographs, a collection of old postcards, a Victorian Society South Wales Group Tour Guide, NMR site files and Cadw registered files.
