= Llantilio Pertholey =

Llantilio Pertholey: Welsh: Llandeilo Bertholau
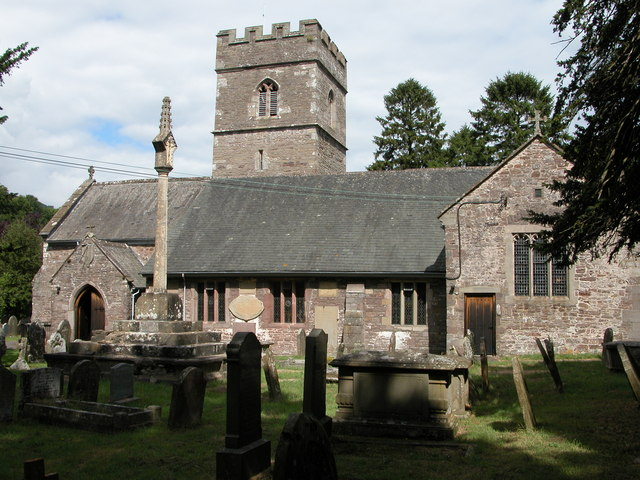
- Church of St. Teilo, Llantilio Pertholey

- Location within Monmouthshire
- Population: 3,906 (2011)
- OS grid reference: SO312164
- Principal area: Monmouthshire
- Preserved county: Gwent
- Country: Wales
- Sovereign state: United Kingdom
- Post town: ABERGAVENNY
- Postcode district: NP7
- Dialling code: 01873
- Police: Gwent
- Fire: South Wales
- Ambulance: Welsh
- UK Parliament: Monmouth
- List of places UK Wales Monmouthshire 51.841439°N 3.000684°W Map of the community

Llantilio Pertholey (Welsh: Llandeilo Bertholau) is a village and community (parish) in Monmouthshire, south east Wales. It is located 2 miles (3.2 km) to the north-east of the market town of Abergavenny, which it is part of, just off the A465 road to Hereford. The parish covers a large area beneath the Skirrid, an outlier of the Black Mountains; much of the parish lies within the easternmost part of the Brecon Beacons National Park.

== Governance ==
The village falls in the 'Mardy' electoral ward. This ward stretches to the east. The total population taken at the 2011 census was 1,469.

== History and amenities ==
The 13th century medieval Church of St Teilo is named after a 6th-century Bishop of Llandaff who was canonised for his good works. The church is a fine example of a rural Welsh church with three chantry chapels dating from about 1350.

The hamlet also had a primary school, which moved to the nearby Mardy district of Abergavenny in 1991. A popular pub, The Mitre, opposite the church closed some years ago.
