= Levally Lough, County Mayo =

Lake in County Mayo, Ireland

Levally Lough
- Loch an Chrainn Chrín (Irish)
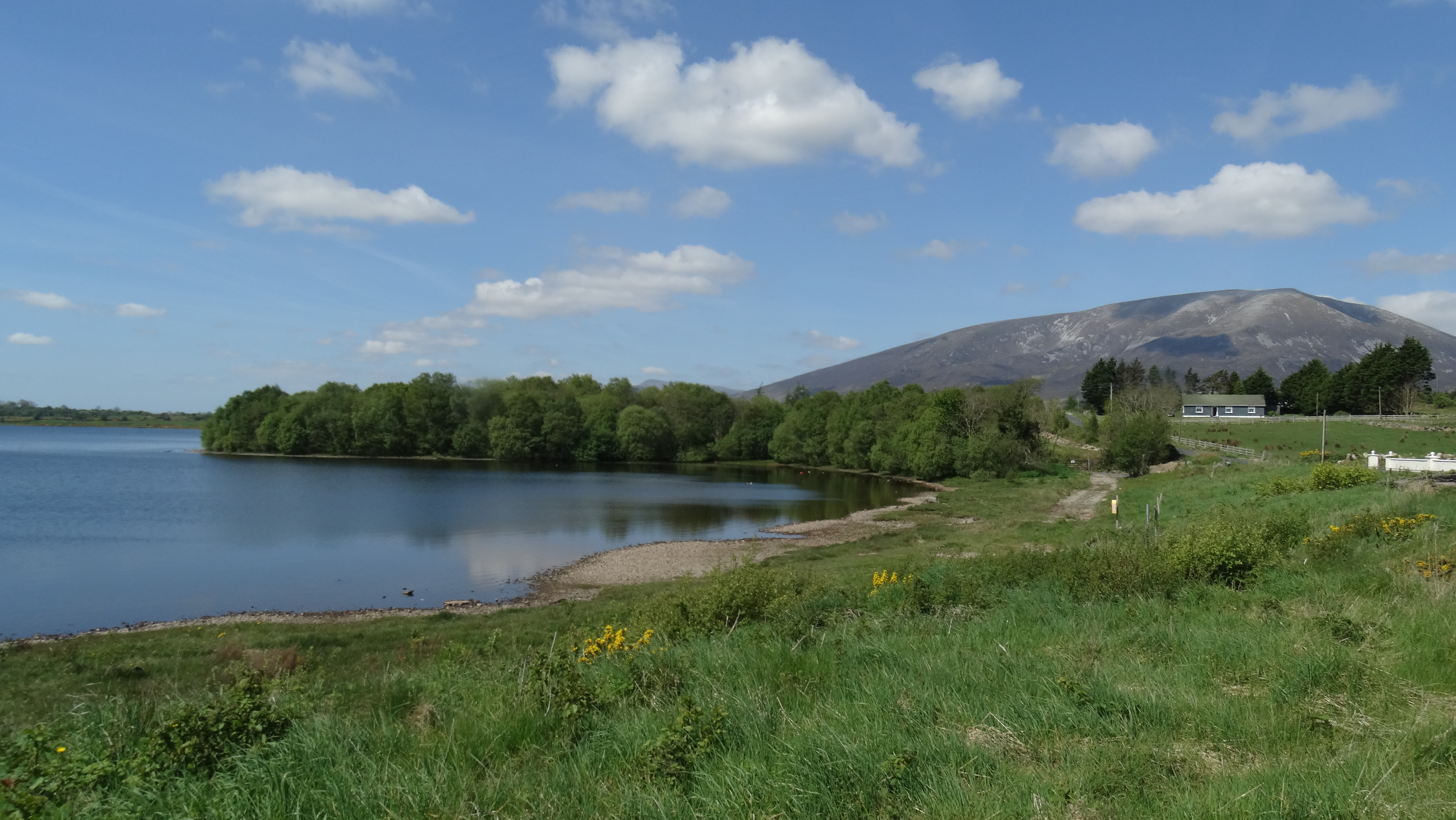
- Levally Lough with Nephin

- Location in Ireland
- Location: County Mayo
- Coordinates: 53°58′57″N 9°18′9″W
- Catchment area: 20.18 km^{2} (7.8 sq mi)
- Basin countries: Ireland
- Max. length: 1.9 km (1.2 mi)
- Max. width: 1.1 km (0.7 mi)
- Surface area: 1.23 km^{2} (0.47 sq mi)
- Surface elevation: 29 m (95 ft)

Levally Lough (Irish: Loch an Chrainn Chrín) is a freshwater lake in the west of Ireland. It is located in County Mayo near Lough Conn.

== Geography and natural history ==
Levally Lough measures about 2 km (1.2 mi) long and 1 km (0.6 mi) wide. It lies about 15 km (9 mi) north of Castlebar and about 5 km (3 mi) west of Pontoon. The lake is a pike fishing destination.

== See also ==
- List of loughs in Ireland
