= Turlough (lake) =

Type of seasonal or periodic lake found in limestone areas of Ireland

A turlough (turloch or turlach in Irish) is a seasonal or periodic water body found mostly in limestone karst areas of Ireland, west of the River Shannon. The name comes from the Irish tur, meaning "dry", and loch, meaning "lake". The water bodies fill and empty with the changes in the level of the water table, usually being very low or empty during summer and autumn and full in the winter. As groundwater levels drop the water drains away underground through cracks in the karstic limestone.

Turloughs are almost unique to Ireland, although there is one example in Wales, Pant-y-Llyn at Cernydd Carmel near Llandeilo. They are of great interest to many scientists: geomorphologists are interested in how turloughs were formed, hydrologists try to explain what makes turloughs flood, botanists study the unusual vegetation which covers the turlough floor, and zoologists study the animals associated with the turloughs.

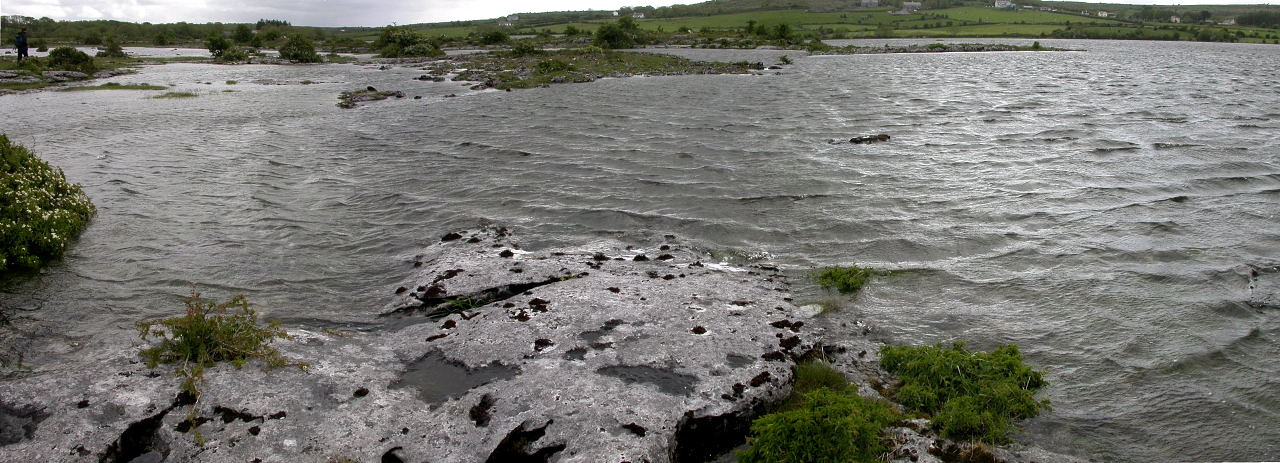
The turlough at Carran, County Clare, Ireland. The water level is high following a spell of wet weather. (Late May 2005)

== Locations ==
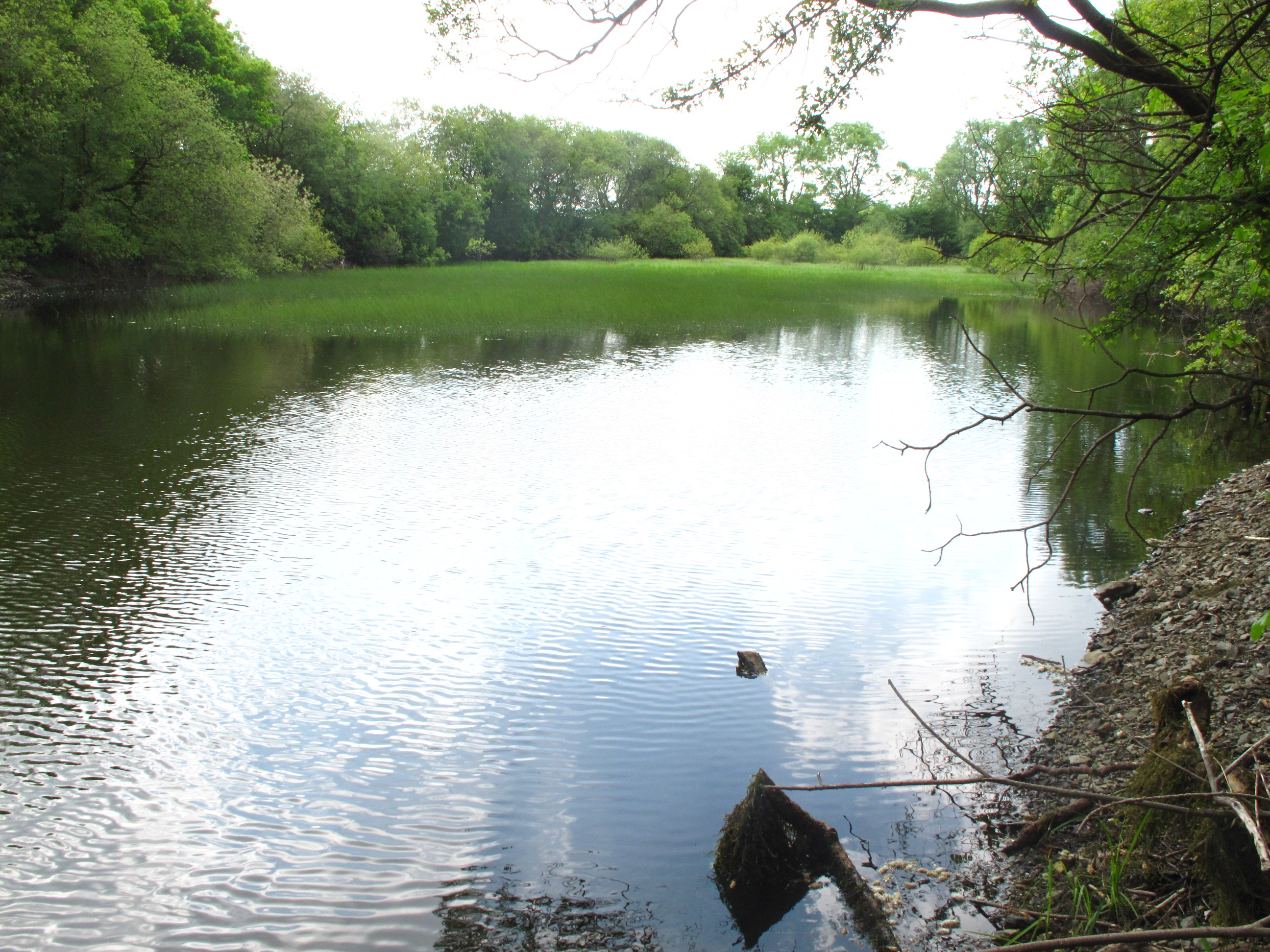
Pant y Llyn turlough, South Wales

Turloughs are mostly found on the central lowlands west of the Shannon, in counties Galway, Clare, Mayo, and Roscommon, although a few are also found elsewhere, e.g. in Limerick, Sligo, Longford, and Cork.

Only three turloughs have been identified in Northern Ireland, namely Roosky, Green, and Fardrum Loughs located near Ely Lodge Forest in County Fermanagh. These constitute the most northerly turloughs in Ireland and have been collectively designated a Ramsar site and an Area of Special Scientific Interest. There is one turlough in South Wales, Pant y Llyn.

Rahasane Turlough in County Galway is the largest surviving turlough in Ireland and is an important location for migrating and overwintering birds. It is noted for its greater white-fronted geese, whooper swans, wigeon, teal, and many waders in winter.

Waterbodies analogous to turloughs can be found elsewhere in the world where similar rainfall patterns, rock type and water table occur. In Eastern Canada (Quebec, New Brunswick and Newfoundland) temporary waterbodies called les lacs mystérieux occur.

In continental Europe, seasonal waterbodies called poljes occur in Slovenia, and a karstic waterbody has been described at Clot d’Espolla in Catalonia. It has recently been proposed that the definition of a turlough, particularly as used in the European Union Habitats Directive, be modified to include the Slovenian waterbodies as well as others. The proposed definition is based solely on the physical aspects of the waterbodies, rather than flora and fauna, which differ between Ireland and Slovenia.

== Geomorphology and hydrology ==
When limestone is exposed to rainwater it can dissolve, leading to cracks and joints forming and enlarging. In areas where limestone is at the surface, with very little soil cover, water will drain underground through these cracks rather than running off overground through river and stream systems. The water can then flow underground, emerging later at springs. At times of higher rainfall, the water table will rise, as the underground flow cannot drain all the water, and turloughs will then fill. When the water table drops they will empty again.

Turloughs will usually have specific place on the floor where water flows in and out, called a swallow-hole (slugaire in Irish). Sometimes an actual hole can be seen, but more often it is a hollow filled with stones. In some larger turloughs the hole will be permanently wet, allowing fully aquatic plants and animals to survive.

Various attempts have been made to classify turloughs into distinct types, such as highland and lowland, fast fluctuating and seasonally fluctuating, or more complex schemes. However, a recent study using multivariate analysis of a wide range of variables characterizing the water bodies shows that there are no distinct types, but rather a continuum from wet to dry.

== Flora ==
Turloughs usually have a mixture of aquatic and terrestrial vegetation, occurring in zones depending on the water depth and frequency/duration of filling. In Ireland, the deepest part is characterised by aquatic and semi-aquatic plants such as Chara, Ranunculus, Potamogeton, Littorella uniflora, Polygonum amphibium and Mentha aquatica. This gradually gives way to a sward of Potentilla anserina, sedges such as Carex panicea, and Viola species. The black turlough moss Cinclidotus fontinaloides grows on surfaces such as rocks and tree trunks. Further up the sides of the turlough shrubs like Frangula alnus and Potentilla fruticosa occur. Some turloughs will instead transition to fen vegetation including sedges and bogbean (Menyanthes trifoliata). Another characteristic feature is the growth of layers of filamentous algae during warm and dry weather, which later dry out and form "algal paper".

== Fauna ==
The intermittent nature of these temporary water bodies provides challenges to aquatic animal life. The organisms commonly found in them have adapted various survival strategies, such as aerial adult forms, production of desiccation-resistant resting stages, and amphibious lifestyles. Fish are usually absent (although in larger turloughs sticklebacks can survive by retreating into the swallow-holes), and frogs and newts may sometimes spawn in them. The lack of predatory fish allows some usually rare invertebrates, such as the Cladocera Eurycercus glacialis, to thrive. Other Cladocera common in turloughs include Alona affinis, Alonella excisa, Chydorus sphaericus, Eurycercus lamellatus and Simocephalus vetulus. A number of beetles that are rare or absent elsewhere in Ireland can be found in turloughs, such as Hygrotus quinquelineatus, Coelambus impressopunctatus, Graptodytes bilineatus, Agabus labiatus, and A. nebulosus. Other invertebrates can also occur, such as fairy shrimp, flatworms and snails.

== See also ==
- Karst – Topography from dissolved soluble rocks
  - Karst lake
  - Karst spring
  - Doline, also sink or sinkhole – a closed depression draining underground in karst areas
  - Subterranean river – River that runs wholly or partly beneath the ground surface

=== Turloughs in Ireland ===
- Four Roads Turlough, County Roscommon
- Glenamaddy Turlough, County Galway
- Lough Funshinagh, County Roscommon
- Rahasane turlough, County Galway
