= List of crustaceans of Montana =

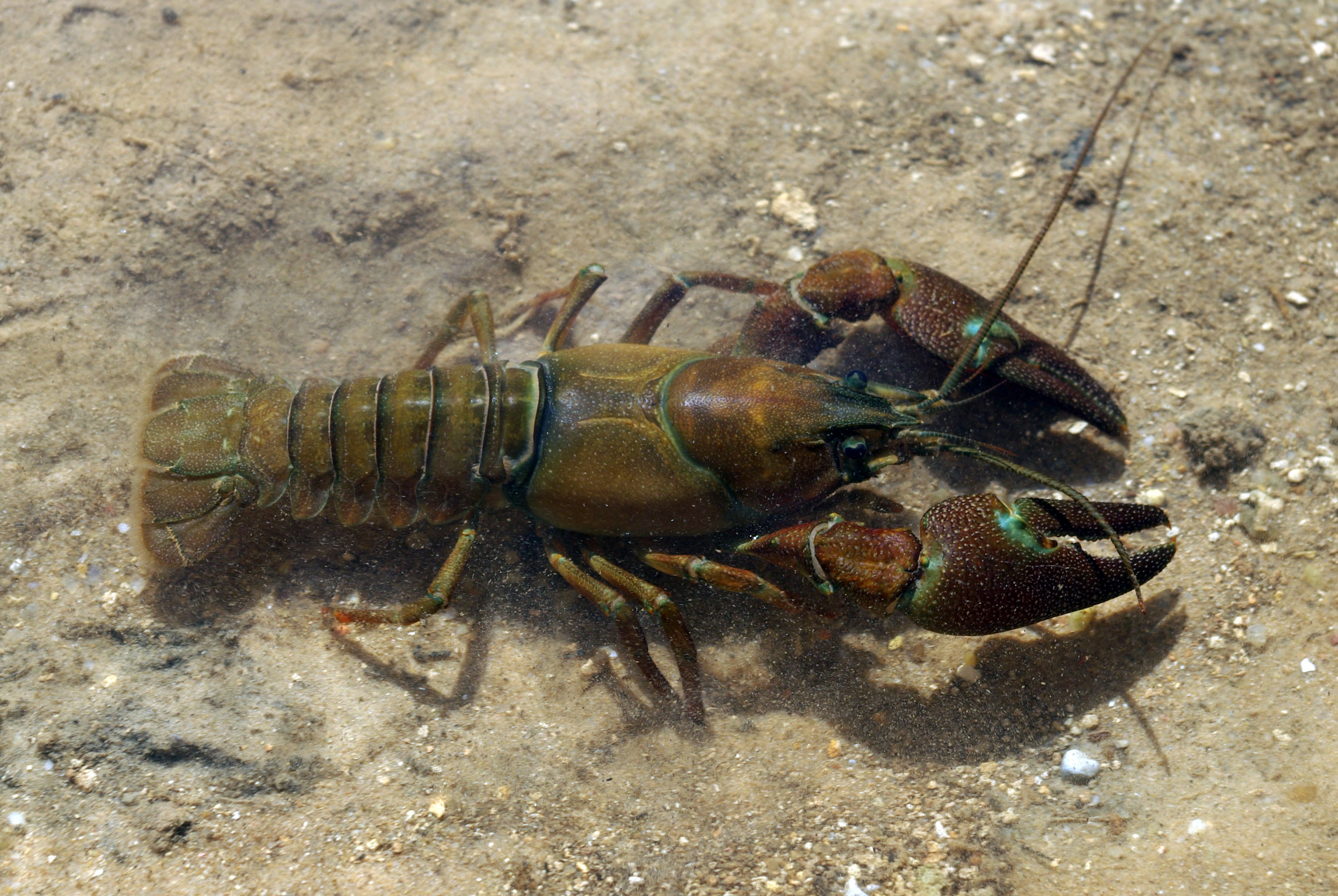
Signal crayfish

There are at least 30 species of crustaceans found in Montana. The Montana Department of Fish, Wildlife and Parks has identified a number of crustacean species as Species of Concern. (Note: "Species of Concern are native taxa that are at-risk due to declining population trends, threats to their habitats, restricted distribution, and/or other factors. Designation as a Montana Species of Concern or Potential Species of Concern is based on the Montana Status Rank, and is not a statutory or regulatory classification. Rather, these designations provide information that helps resource managers make proactive decisions regarding species conservation and data collection priorities. See the latest Species of Concern Reports for more detailed explanations and assessment criteria.")

== Crustaceans ==
Crustaceans (Crustacea) form a very large group of arthropods, usually treated as a subphylum, which includes such familiar animals as crabs, lobsters, crayfish, shrimp, krill and barnacles. The 50,000 described species range in size from Stygotantulus stocki at 0.1 mm (0.004 in), to the Japanese spider crab with a leg span of up to 12.5 ft (3.8 m) and a mass of 44 lb (20 kg). Like other arthropods, crustaceans have an exoskeleton, which they moult to grow. They are distinguished from other groups of arthropods, such as insects, myriapods and chelicerates by the possession of biramous (two-parted) limbs, and by the nauplius form of the larvae.

Most crustaceans are free-living aquatic animals, but some are terrestrial (e.g. woodlice), some are parasitic (e.g. fish lice, tongue worms) and some are sessile (e.g. barnacles). The group has an extensive fossil record, reaching back to the Cambrian, and includes living fossils such as Triops cancriformis, which has existed apparently unchanged since the Triassic period. More than 10 million tons of crustaceans are produced by fishery or farming for human consumption, the majority of it being shrimp and prawns. Krill and copepods are not as widely fished, but may be the animals with the greatest biomass on the planet, and form a vital part of the food chain. The scientific study of crustaceans is known as carcinology (alternatively, malacostracology, crustaceology or crustalogy), and a scientist who works in carcinology is a carcinologist.

== List of crustaceans of Montana ==
=== Malacostraca ===
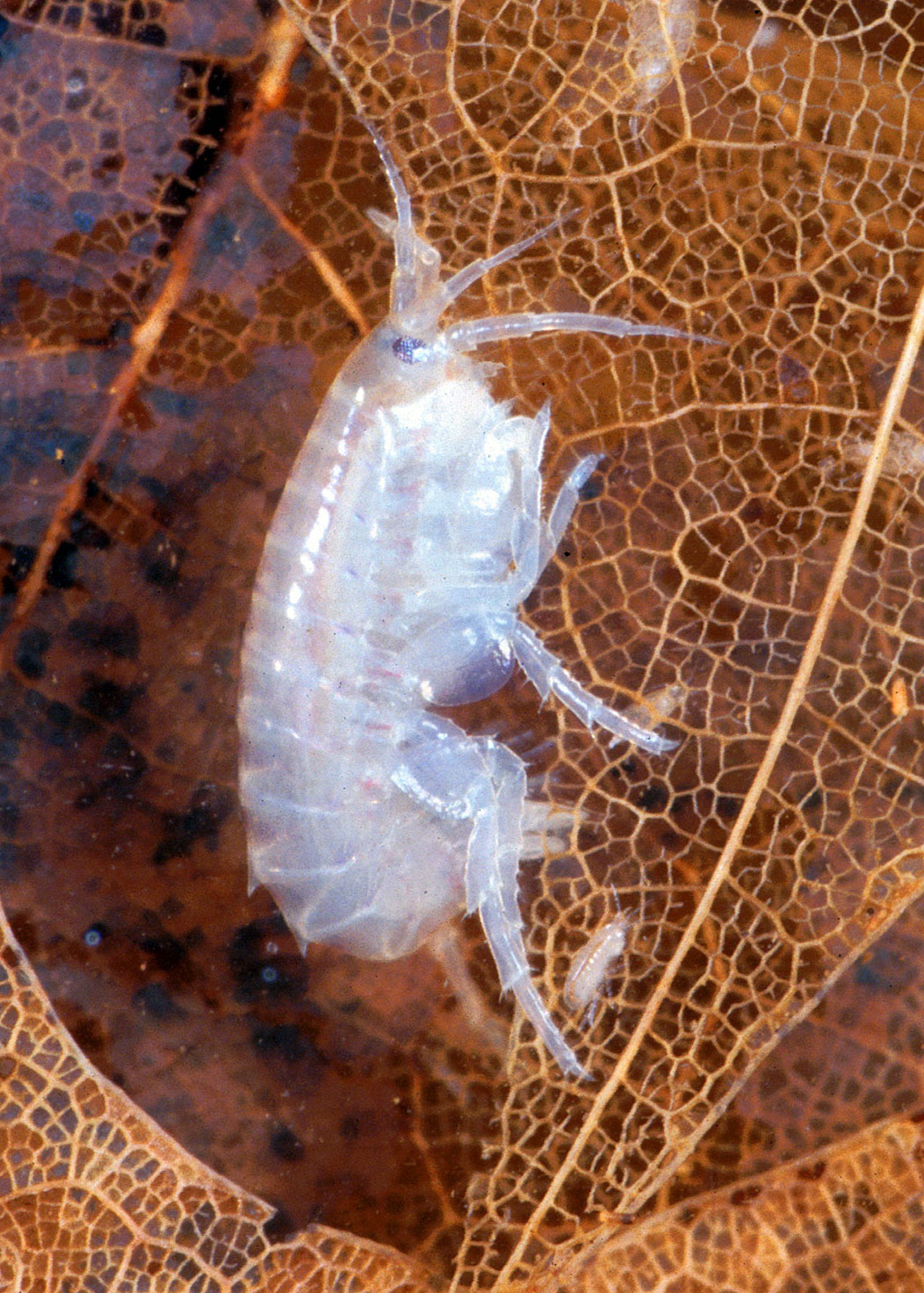
Hyalella azteca

Class: Malacostraca

- Astacid crayfishes Order: Decapoda, Family: Astacidae
  - Pilose crayfish, Pacifastacus gambelii
  - Signal crayfish, Pacifastacus leniusculus
- Cambarid crayfishes Order: Decapoda, Family: Cambaridae
  - Calico crayfish, Faxonius immunis
  - Virile crayfish, Faxonius virilis
- Gammarid amphipods Order: Amphipoda, Family: Crangonyctidae
  - Stygobromus montanensis
  - Stygobromus obscurus
  - Stygobromus puteanus
  - Stygobromus tritus
  - Glacier amphipod, Stygobromus glacialis
- Order: Amphipoda, Family: Gammaridae
  - Gammarus lacustris
- Order: Amphipoda, Family: Hyalellidae
  - Hyalella azteca
- Order: Isopoda, Family: Asellidae
  - Salmasellus steganothrix
  - Caecidotea communis
  - Caecidotea racovitzai

=== Fairy shrimp ===
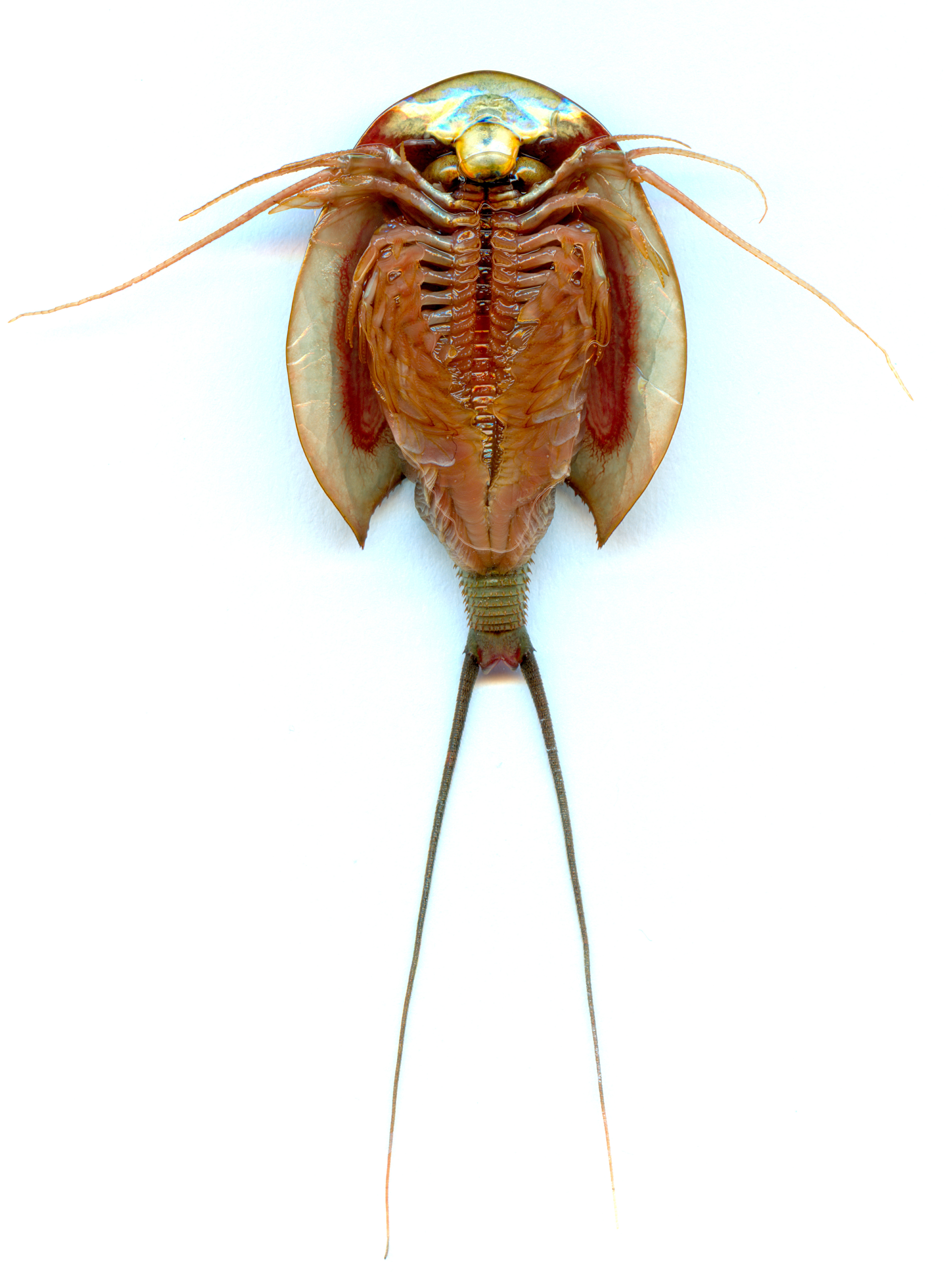
Triops longicaudatus

Class: Branchiopoda

- Branchinectid brine shrimp Order: Anostraca, Family: Branchinectidae
  - Circumpolar fairy shrimp, Branchinecta paludosa
  - Colorado fairy shrimp, Branchinecta coloradensis
  - Giant fairy shrimp, Branchinecta gigas
  - Rock pool fairy shrimp, Branchinecta packardi
  - Versatile fairy shrimp, Branchinecta lindahli
- Chirocephalid brine shrimp Order: Anostraca, Family: Chirocephalidae
  - Ethologist fairy shrimp, Eubranchipus serratus
  - Ornate fairy shrimp, Eubranchipus ornatus
  - Smoothlip fairy shrimp, Eubranchipus intricatus
- Clam shrimp Order: Spinicaudata, Family: Cyzicidae
  - Bristletail clam shrimp, Caenestheriella setosa
- Clam Shrimp Order: Laevicaudata, Family: Lynceidae
  - Hookleg clam shrimp, Lynceus mucronatus
- Fairy shrimp Order: Notostraca, Family: Triopsidae
  - Bilobed tadpole shrimp, Lepidurus bilobatus
  - Lemon tadpole shrimp, Lepidurus lemmoni
  - Longtail tadpole shrimp, Triops longicaudatus
  - Round spine tadpole shrimp, Lepidurus couesii
- Streptocephalid brine shrimp Order: Anostraca, Family: Streptocephalidae
  - Greater plains fairy shrimp, Streptocephalus texanus
  - Spinytail fairy shrimp, Streptocephalus sealii

== See also ==
- List of amphibians and reptiles of Montana
- List of birds of Montana
- List of clams and mussels of Montana
- Mammals of Montana
