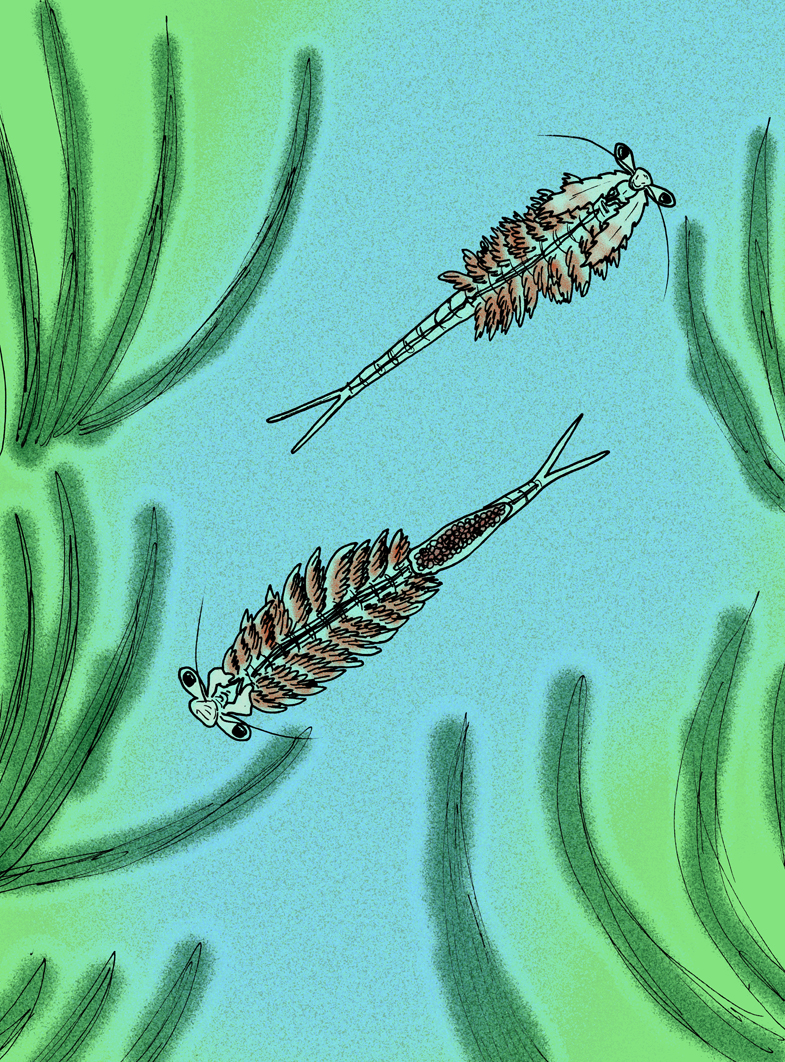
- Restoration of male (top), and female (below)

Conservation status
- Extinct (2011) (IUCN 2.3)

Scientific classification
- Kingdom: Animalia
- Phylum: Arthropoda
- Clade: Pancrustacea
- Class: Branchiopoda
- Order: Anostraca
- Family: Chirocephalidae
- Genus: †Dexteria; Brtek, 1965
- Species: †D. floridana

Binomial name
- †Dexteria floridana (Dexter, 1953)

Synonyms
- Eubranchipus floridana Dexter, 1953

= Dexteria =

Genus of small freshwater animals

Dexteria floridana, the florida fairy shrimp, is an extinct species of fairy shrimp in the family Chirocephalidae, the only species in the genus Dexteria. It was endemic to Florida, where it was known from a single pool, south of Gainesville. It was originally described by Ralph W. Dexter in 1953 as a species of Eubranchipus. The species was declared extinct on October 5, 2011 because it was found that the only known pool of water that contained the known population was filled in for development, thereby killing the shrimps.
