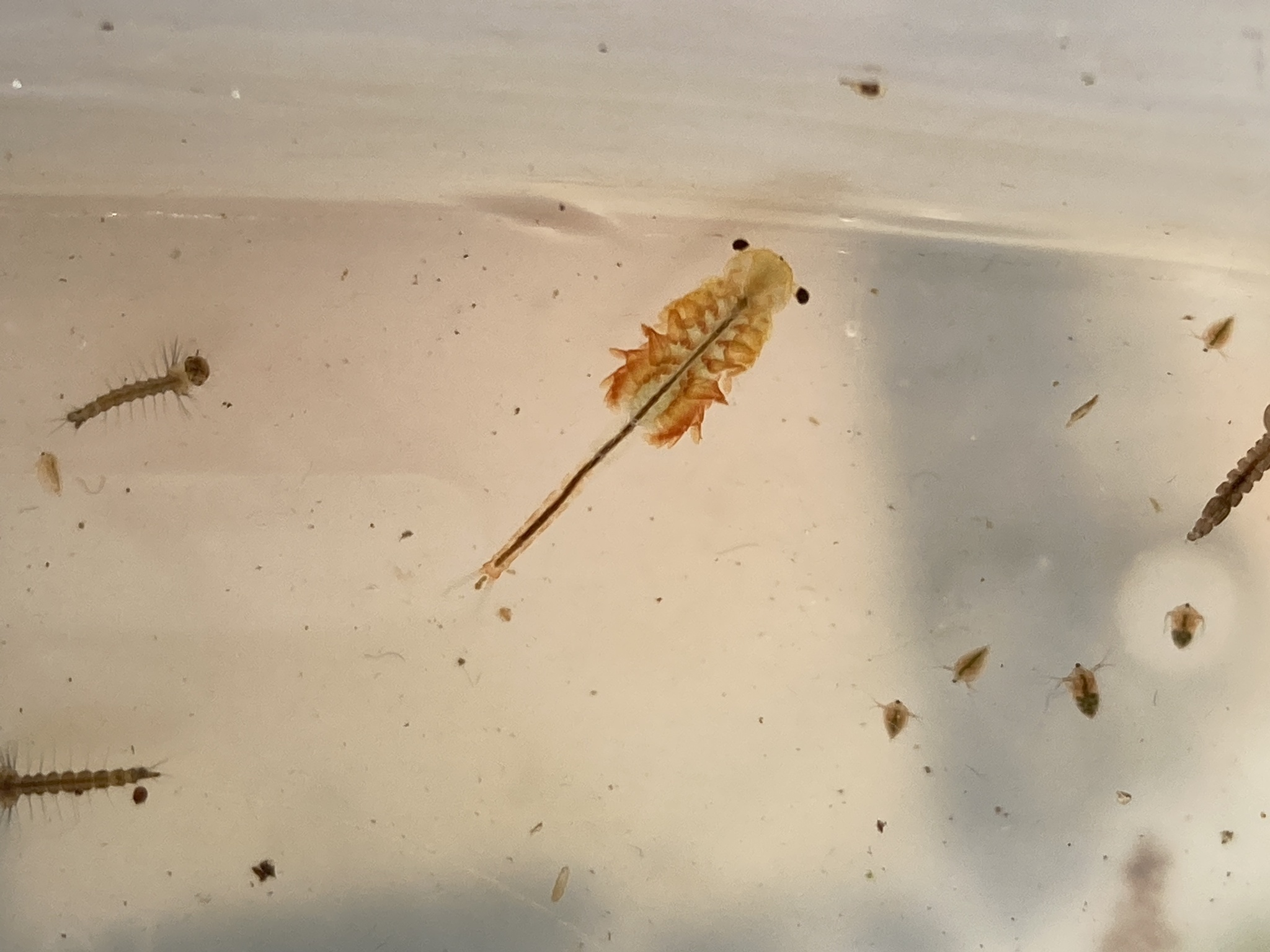

Scientific classification
- Kingdom: Animalia
- Phylum: Arthropoda
- Class: Branchiopoda
- Order: Anostraca
- Family: Chirocephalidae
- Genus: Eubranchipus
- Species: E. bundyi

Binomial name
- Eubranchipus bundyi Forbes, 1876

= Eubranchipus bundyi =

Species of crustacean

Eubranchipus bundyi, the knobbedlip fairy shrimp, is a species of fairy shrimp in the genus Eubranchipus. It is the most common species of fairy shrimp throughout much of its northern North American range.

== Range ==
The United States and Canada.

== Habitat ==
Freshwater seasonal wetlands.
