= Linderiella massaliensis =

Scientific classification
- Domain: Eukaryota
- Kingdom: Animalia
- Phylum: Arthropoda
- Class: Branchiopoda
- Order: Anostraca
- Family: Chirocephalidae
- Genus: Linderiella
- Species: L. massaliensis

Binomial name
- Linderiella massaliensis Thiéry & Champeau, 1988

Species of small freshwater animal

Linderiella massaliensis is a species of fairy shrimp in the family Chirocephalidae. It is found in Europe and Northern Asia (excluding China).
