= Chirocephalus reiseri =

Conservation status
- Vulnerable (IUCN 2.3)

Scientific classification
- Kingdom: Animalia
- Phylum: Arthropoda
- Class: Branchiopoda
- Order: Anostraca
- Family: Chirocephalidae
- Genus: Chirocephalus
- Species: C. reiseri

Binomial name
- Chirocephalus reiseri Marcus, 1913

Species of small freshwater animal

Chirocephalus reiseri is a species of crustacean in the family Chirocephalidae. It is endemic to Bosnia and Herzegovina.
