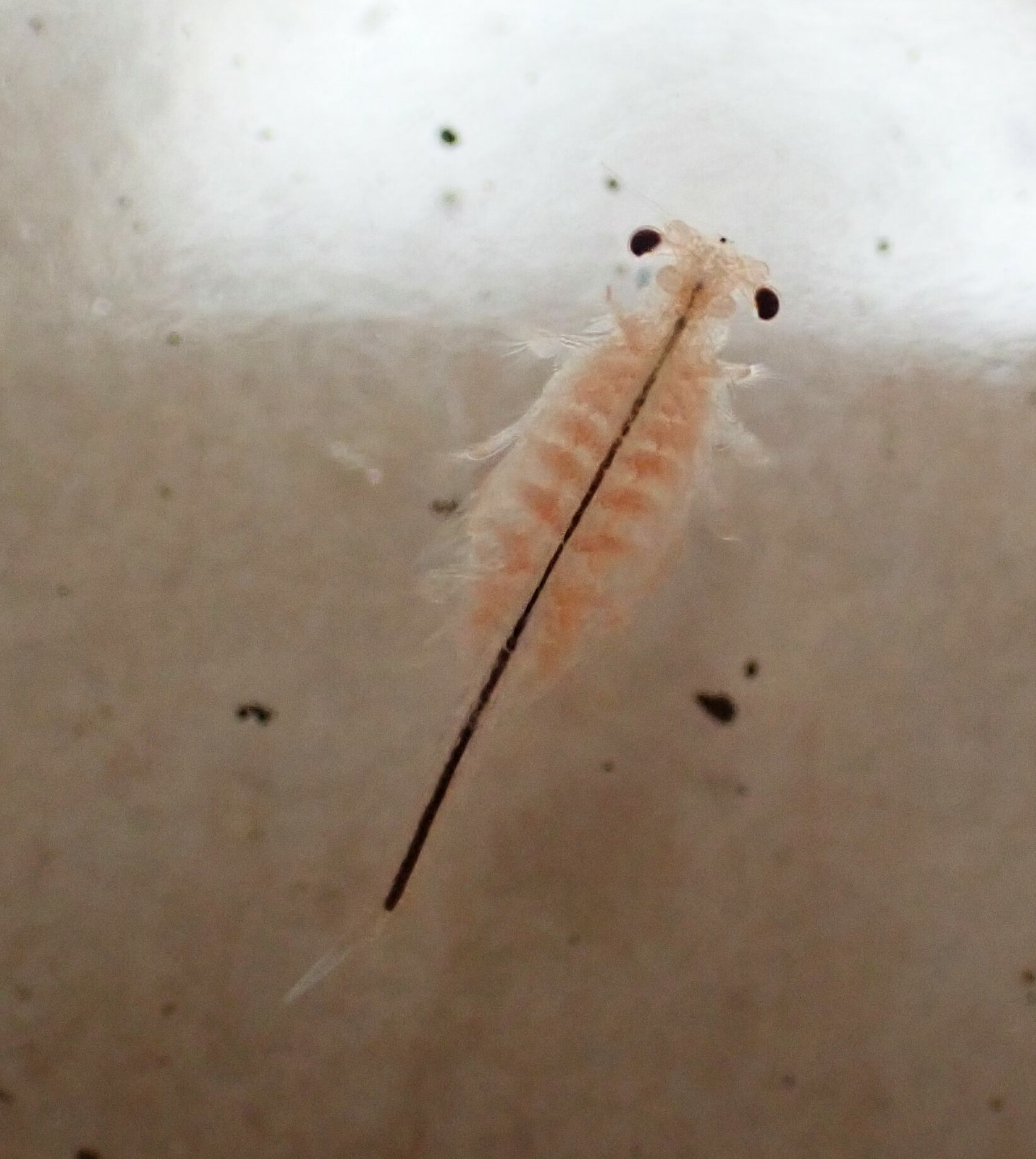

Conservation status
- Vulnerable (NatureServe)

Scientific classification
- Domain: Eukaryota
- Kingdom: Animalia
- Phylum: Arthropoda
- Class: Branchiopoda
- Order: Anostraca
- Family: Chirocephalidae
- Genus: Eubranchipus
- Species: E. oregonus

Binomial name
- Eubranchipus oregonus Creaser, 1930

= Eubranchipus oregonus =

Species of arthropod

Eubranchipus oregonus, or the Oregon fairy shrimp, is a species of fairy shrimp in the genus Eubranchipus. The species is vulnerable in Canada.

== Description ==
Oregon fairy shrimp may range in colour from white, pink, pale reddish-orange, or greenish-blue. They swim upside down. The typical size for mature males is up to 15.6 mm (0.61 in) and up to 26.8 mm (1.06 in) for mature females. The complete life cycle of Oregon fairy shrimp is approximately 23 - 25 weeks.

== Range ==
The distribution of this species spans less than 40 locations in the Pacific Northwest, ranging from southern British Columbia (the Lower Mainland, south Vancouver Island, select Gulf Islands) to northern California, and a few sites in wetter regions of the Sierra Nevada Mountain range. Isolate population occurrences in Oklahoma are associated with the southern boundary of the Laurentide Ice Sheet.

== Habitat ==
Oregon fairy shrimp are considered an indicator species, and are found in shallow freshwater vernal pools that are typically neutral to mildly acidic in nature.

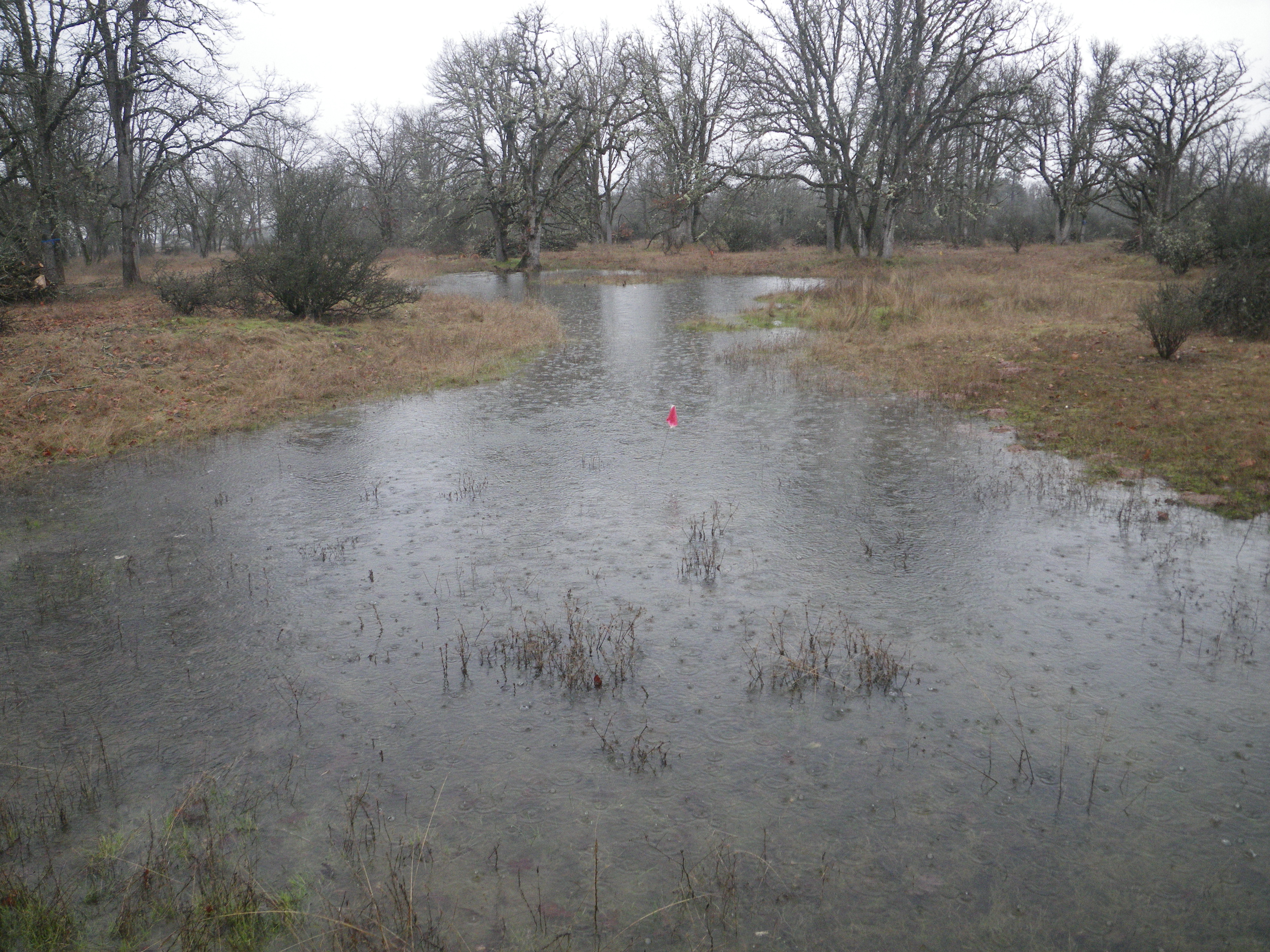
A vernal pool in Oregon
