= Calamus Swamp =

Nature preserve in Ohio, United States

- Calamus Swamp Nature Preserve
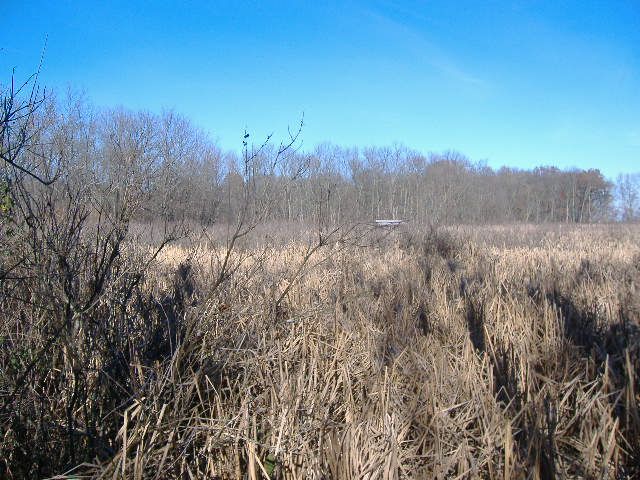
- Calamus Swamp

- Location within Ohio Location within the United States
- Location: Pickaway County, Ohio
- Nearest city: Circleville, OH
- Coordinates: 39°35′N 83°0′W
- Area: 19 acres (7.7 ha)
- Established: 2000

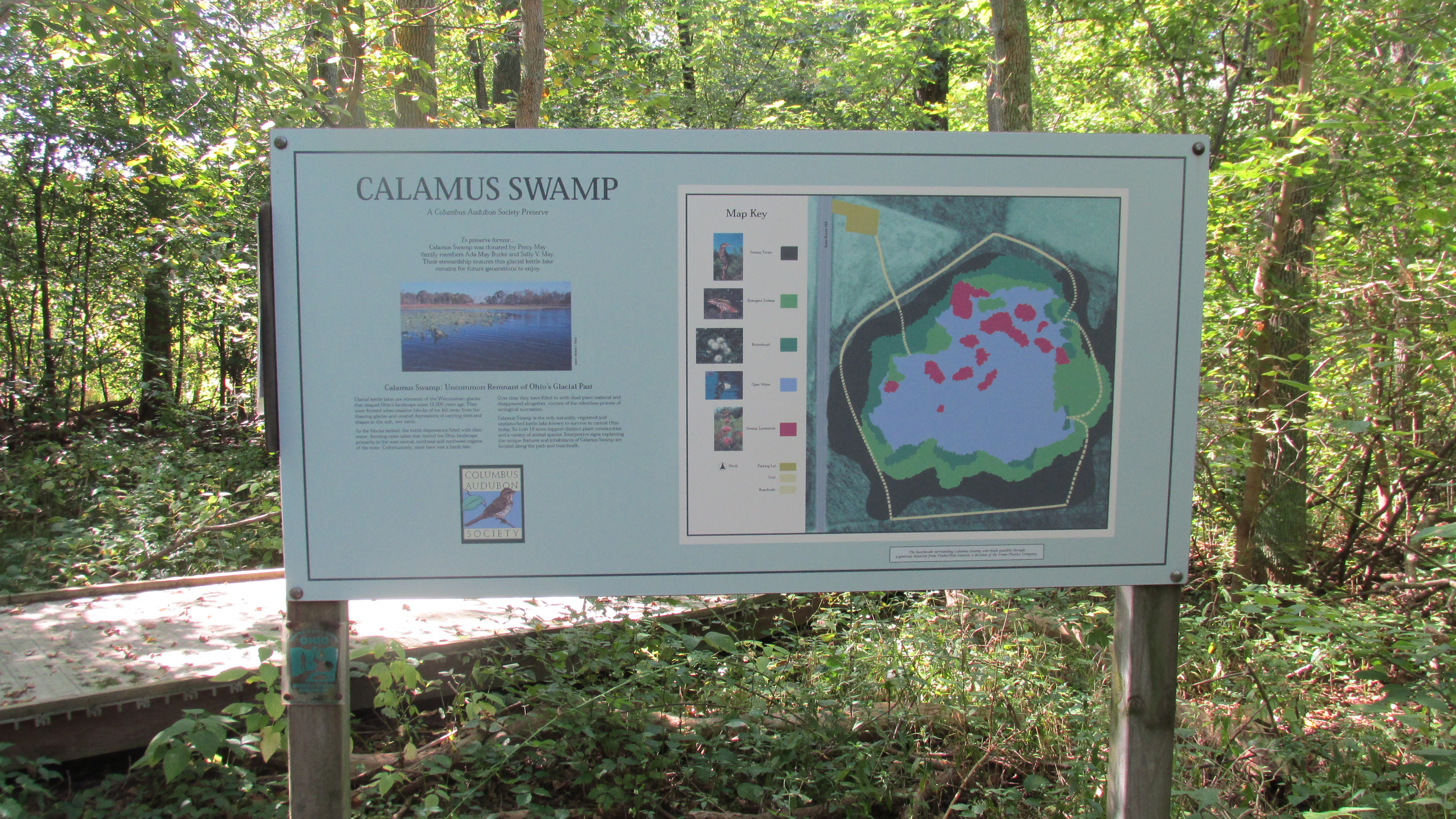
Calamus Swamp

Calamus Swamp is a 19-acre (0.077 km^{2}) public preserve located 1.5 miles (2.4 km) from Circleville in Pickaway County, Ohio, United States. It has a natural kettle lake/wetland and is owned by the Columbus Audubon, the local chapter of Audubon.

== History ==
Calamus Swamp includes the only known kettle lake in central Ohio that is naturally vegetated and undisturbed. The kettle lake was made in the last ice age by the glacier that covered 2/3 of Ohio.

When Ada May Burke and Sally V. May received the land, they donated it to Columbus Audubon, who then converted the land into a public preserve.

== Plant life ==
According to the Columbus Audubon website, Calamus Swamp has a unique plant community. Because of the moist soil, trees such as the American elm, Green Ash and, in places, Red and Silver maples can be found in the swamp forest.

== Animals ==
Calamus Swamp has a wide range of birds and animals. Because the Scioto River is only 1.5 miles (2.4 km) away, the lake attracts many migrating water birds, such as ducks, geese, grebes, and others.

Mammals that have been found in the area include raccoons, muskrats, groundhogs, opossums, and white-tailed deer.

The lake is home to other animals including the Ohio fairy shrimp, white leech, horse leech, giant water bug, pond snail, and the blood sucking leech.
