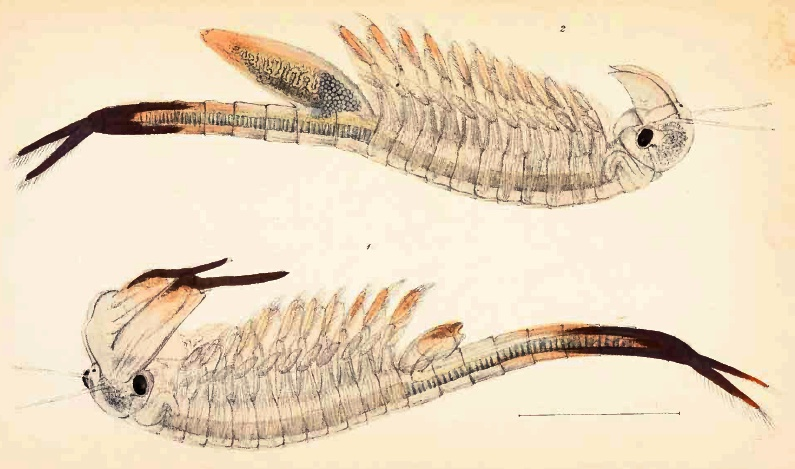
- Chirocephalus diaphanus

Scientific classification
- Domain: Eukaryota
- Kingdom: Animalia
- Phylum: Arthropoda
- Class: Branchiopoda
- Order: Anostraca
- Family: Chirocephalidae
- Genus: Chirocephalus; Prévost, 1803

= Chirocephalus =

Genus of small freshwater animals

Chirocephalus is a genus of fairy shrimp in the family Chirocephalidae. It contains the following species:

- Chirocephalus algidus Cottarelli et al., 2010
- Chirocephalus anatolicus Cottarelli, Mura & Özkütük, 2007
- Chirocephalus appendicularis Vavra, 1905
- Chirocephalus baikalensis (Naganawa & Orgiljanova, 2000)
- Chirocephalus bairdi (Brauer, 1877)
- Chirocephalus bobrinskii (Alcock, 1898)
- Chirocephalus brevipalpis (Orghidan, 1953)
- Chirocephalus brteki Cottarelli et al., 2010
- Chirocephalus carnuntanus (Brauer, 1877)
- Chirocephalus chyzeri Daday, 1890
- Chirocephalus croaticus Steuer, 1899
- Chirocephalus cupreus Cottarelli, Mura & Özkütük, 2007
- Chirocephalus diaphanus Prévost, 1803
- Chirocephalus festae Colosi, 1922
- Chirocephalus hardingi Brtek, 1965
- Chirocephalus horribilis Smirnov, 1948
- Chirocephalus jaxartensis (Smirnov, 1948)
- Chirocephalus josephinae (Grube, 1853)
- Chirocephalus kerkyrensis Pesta, 1936
- Chirocephalus longicornis (Smirnov, 1930)
- Chirocephalus ludmilae Vekhoff, 1992
- Chirocephalus marchesonii Ruffo & Vesentini, 1957
- Chirocephalus mongolianus Uéno, 1940
- Chirocephalus murai Brtek & Cottarelli, 2006
- Chirocephalus nankinensis (Shen, 1933)
- Chirocephalus neumanni Hartland-Rowe, 1967
- Chirocephalus orghidani Brtek, 1966
- Chirocephalus paphlagonicus Cottarelli, 1971
- Chirocephalus pelagonicus Petkovski, 1986
- Chirocephalus ponticus Beladjal & Mertens, 1997
- Chirocephalus povolnyi Brtek, 1967
- Chirocephalus priscus (Daday, 1910)
- Chirocephalus recticornis (Brauer, 1877)
- Chirocephalus reiseri Marcus, 1913
- Chirocephalus ripophilus (Lepeschkin, 1921)
- Chirocephalus robustus G. I. Müller, 1966
- Chirocephalus ruffoi Cottarelli & Mura, 1984
- Chirocephalus salinus Daday, 1910
- Chirocephalus shadini (Smirnov, 1928)
- Chirocephalus sibyllae Cottarelli & Mura, 1975
- Chirocephalus sinensis Thiele, 1907
- Chirocephalus skorikowi Daday, 1912
- Chirocephalus slovacicus Brtek, 1971
- Chirocephalus soulukliensis Rogers & Soufi, 2013
- Chirocephalus spinicaudatus Simon, 1886
- Chirocephalus tauricus Pesta, 1921
- Chirocephalus tereki Brtek, 1984
- Chirocephalus turkestanicus Daday, 1910
- Chirocephalus vornatscheri Brtek, 1968
- Chirocephalus wangi Hsü, 1933
- Chirocephalus weisigi Smirnov, 1933
