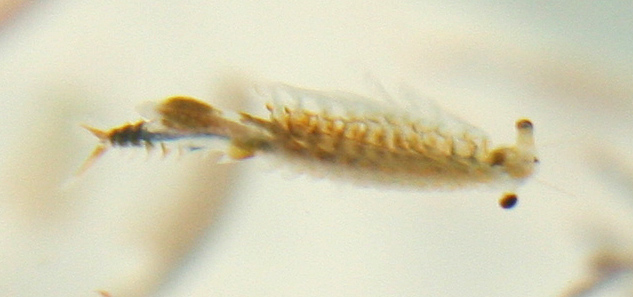
- Female C. croaticus

Conservation status
- Vulnerable (IUCN 2.3)

Scientific classification
- Kingdom: Animalia
- Phylum: Arthropoda
- Class: Branchiopoda
- Order: Anostraca
- Family: Chirocephalidae
- Genus: Chirocephalus
- Species: C. croaticus

Binomial name
- Chirocephalus croaticus (Steuer, 1899)

= Chirocephalus croaticus =

Species of small freshwater animal

Chirocephalus croaticus is a species of fairy shrimp in the family Chirocephalidae. It is found only in Croatia and Slovenia and is listed as a vulnerable species on the IUCN Red List.
