= Linderiella santarosae =

Conservation status
- Critically Imperiled (NatureServe)

Scientific classification
- Kingdom: Animalia
- Phylum: Arthropoda
- Class: Branchiopoda
- Order: Anostraca
- Family: Chirocephalidae
- Genus: Linderiella
- Species: L. santarosae

Binomial name
- Linderiella santarosae Thiéry & Fugate, 1994

Species of small freshwater animal

Linderiella santarosae, the Santa Rosa linderiella, is a species of fairy shrimp in the family Chirocephalidae. It is found in North America.
