= Chirocephalus pelagonicus =

Conservation status
- Vulnerable (IUCN 2.3)

Scientific classification
- Kingdom: Animalia
- Phylum: Arthropoda
- Class: Branchiopoda
- Order: Anostraca
- Family: Chirocephalidae
- Genus: Chirocephalus
- Species: C. pelagonicus

Binomial name
- Chirocephalus pelagonicus Petkovski, 1986

Species of small freshwater animal

Chirocephalus pelagonicus is a species of crustaceans in the family Chirocephalidae. It is endemic to North Macedonia.
