= Linderiella africana =

Scientific classification
- Domain: Eukaryota
- Kingdom: Animalia
- Phylum: Arthropoda
- Class: Branchiopoda
- Order: Anostraca
- Family: Chirocephalidae
- Genus: Linderiella
- Species: L. africana

Binomial name
- Linderiella africana Thiéry, 1986

Species of small freshwater animal

Linderiella africana is a species of fairy shrimp in the family Chirocephalidae. It is found in Africa.
