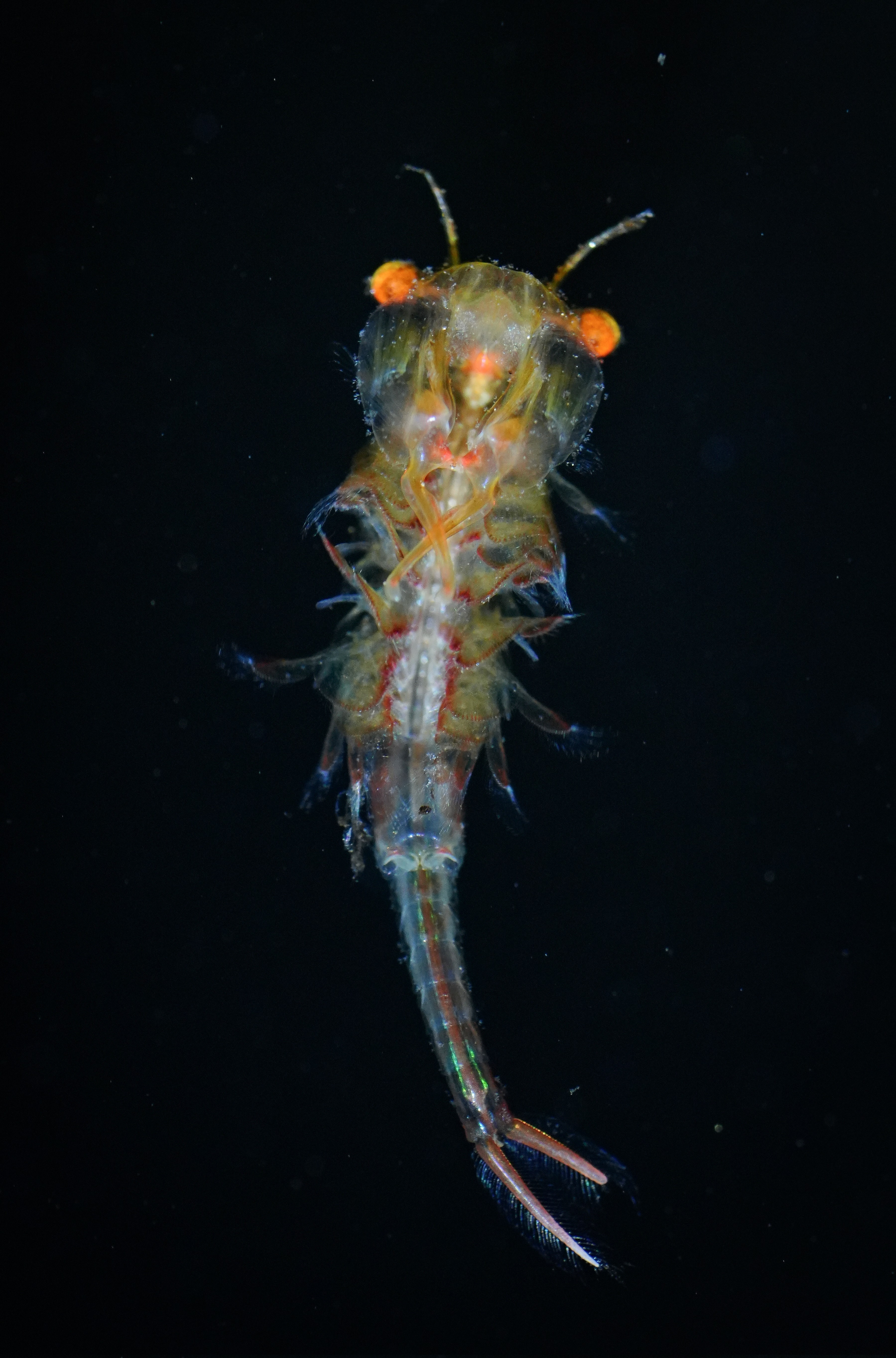
- Adult male Eubranchipus vernalis

Scientific classification
- Kingdom: Animalia
- Phylum: Arthropoda
- Clade: Pancrustacea
- Class: Branchiopoda
- Order: Anostraca
- Family: Chirocephalidae
- Genus: Eubranchipus
- Species: E. vernalis

Binomial name
- Eubranchipus vernalis (Verrill, 1869)

Synonyms
- Branchipus vernalis Verrill, 1869; Branchipus stagnalis De Kay, 1844

= Eubranchipus vernalis =

Species of freshwater fairy shrimp

Eubranchipus vernalis, known generally as the springtime fairy shrimp or eastern fairy shrimp, is a species of freshwater fairy shrimp in the family Chirocephalidae. It inhabits cool, temporary, usually fish-free vernal pools in eastern North America and is active from late winter through spring.

== Taxonomy ==
Eubranchipus vernalis was originally described by Addison Emery Verrill in 1869 as Branchipus vernalis. The genus Eubranchipus was shortly thereafter established by Verrill in 1870, moving the taxon to the modern designation Eubranchipus vernalis; some catalogues also give the fuller subgeneric form Eubranchipus (Eubranchipus) vernalis.

Later in the twentieth century, the application of the name E. vernalis was complicated by confusion with Eubranchipus neglectus. Although Garman's original 1926 description had correctly distinguished the two species by their male antennal appendages, Creaser's 1930 revision of the genus included a mislabelled figure 3, in which a diagram of E. neglectus was mistakenly attributed to E. vernalis. This error was repeated in later identification literature, including Pennak's 1953 key and Dexter's 1959 treatment of Anostraca, eventually contributing to Brtek's 1966 treatment of E. neglectus as a synonym or possible subspecies of E. vernalis. In 1998, Belk, Mura and Weeks restored the separation of the two species based on male antennal structure, resting eggs morphology, and the spatial distribution of historic collection records. Their review of verified records found the two species to have disjunct ranges, with the Appalachian Mountains forming the approximate boundary between them: E. vernalis occurring east of the range, and E. neglectus to the west.

== Description ==
Typical of other fairy shrimp, Eubranchipus vernalis has an elongate body and swims ventral side upward using a series of leaf-like appendages called phyllopods. Sexual dimorphism is most apparent at maturity: males have characteristically enlarged second antennae, while mature females have an ovisac situated above the genital segments at the base of the abdomen.

Adult sexual dimorphism

Adult male, ventral view, showing the enlarged paired second antennae.

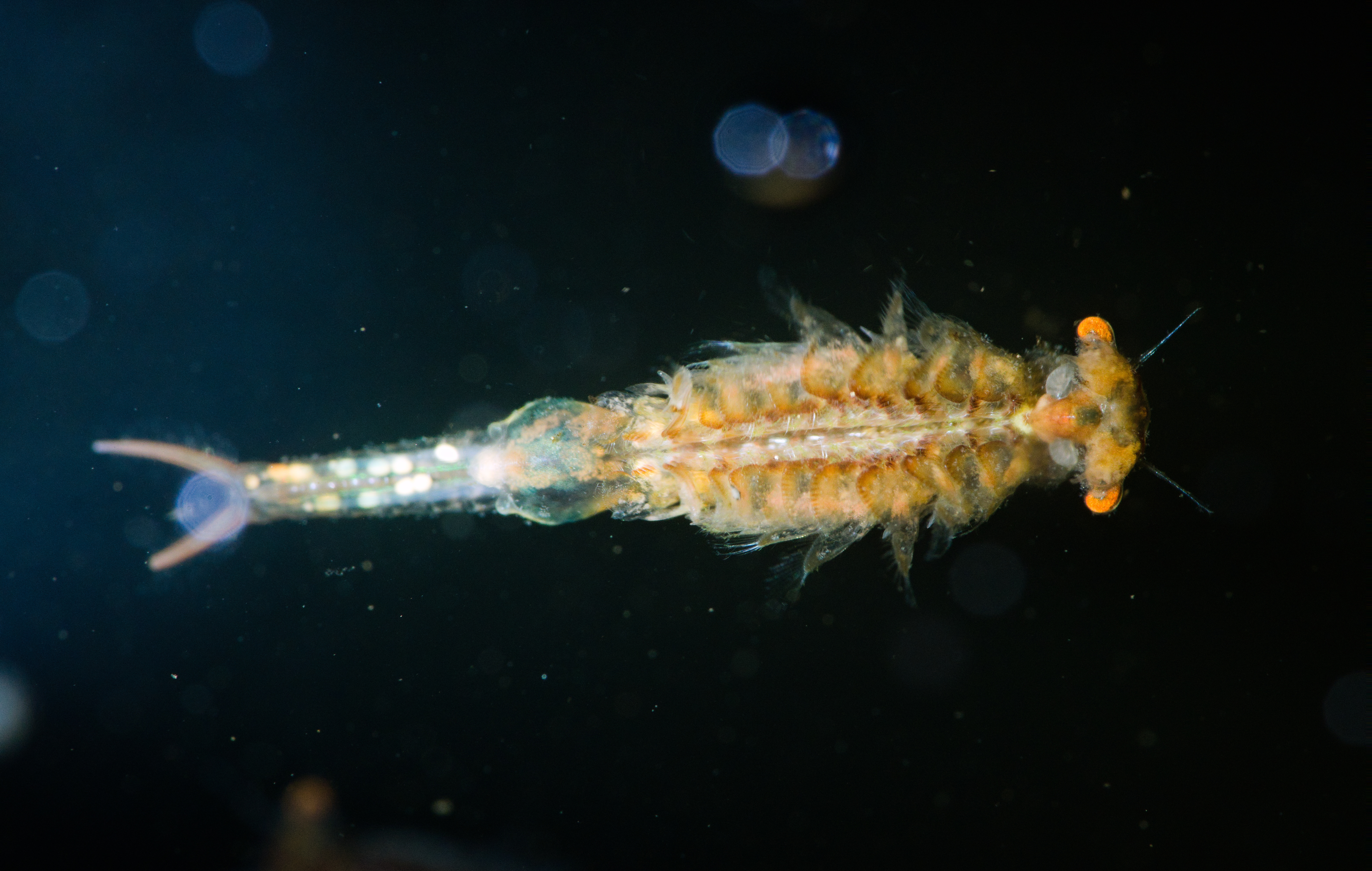
Adult female, ventral view, showing the ovisac near the base of the abdomen.

Adult male and female E. vernalis.

Adults are small, with reported lengths of about 10 to 25 mm (0.39 to 0.98 in). Males are typically a bit larger than females, with proportionally larger heads and enlarged antennae, although analysis of sex-specific length ranges has never been formally carried out for this taxon. Body color is usually described as light pinkish-orange, but individuals may also appear translucent white, bluish, or greenish, depending on diet and age; juveniles have been described as more orange than adults. Direct experimental work on color variation has not been reported for E. vernalis, but diet-related coloration has been demonstrated in another anostracan: β-carotene-fed Thamnocephalus platyurus developed orange appendages and green-bluish ovaries or oocytes, while individuals not fed β-carotene remained whitish.

Like other members of Anostraca, E. vernalis lacks a carapace, giving the body a relatively exposed, segmented appearance compared with many other small crustaceans.

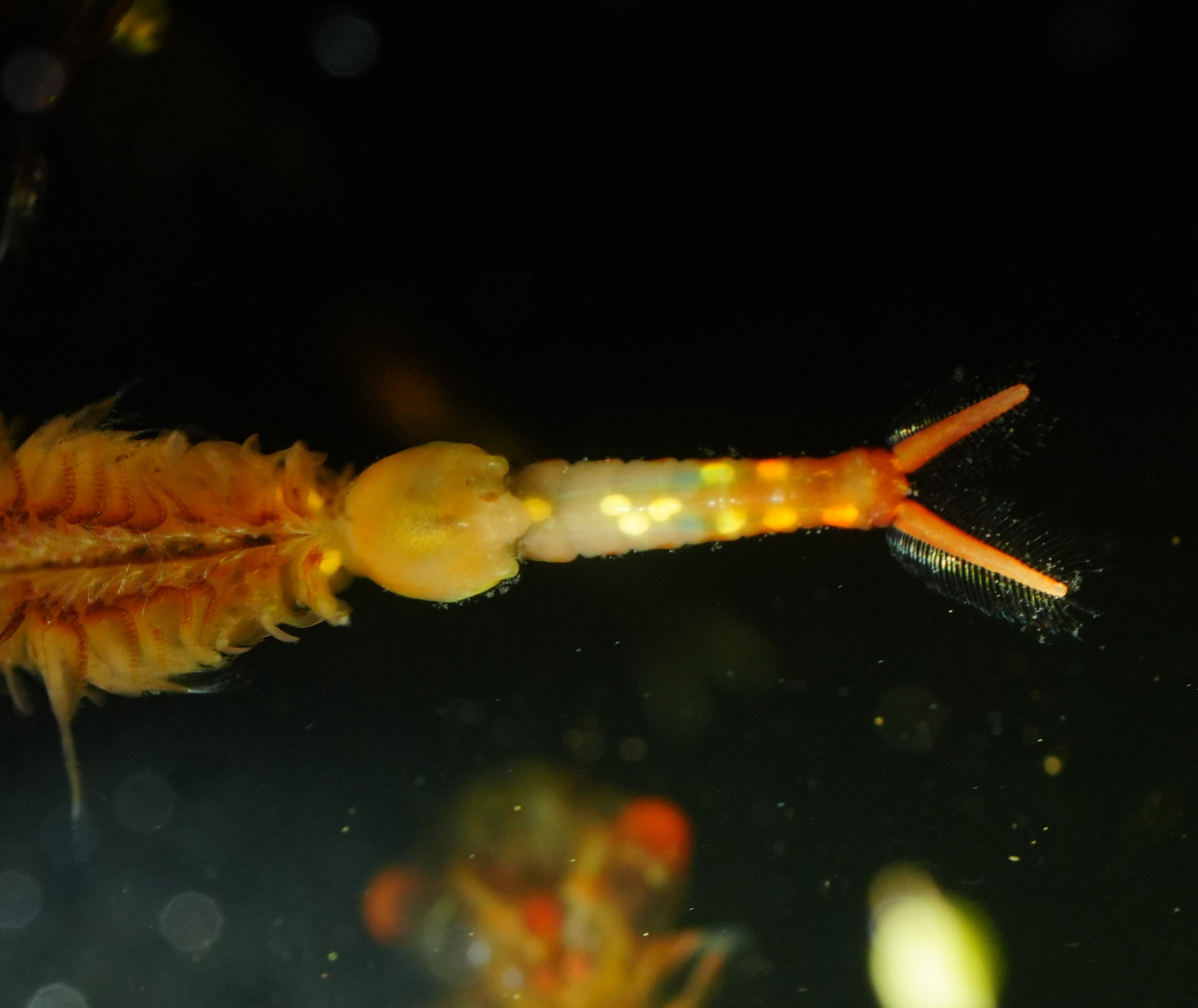
Female E. vernalis ovisac. The egg-bearing pouch is held close to the body and, ventrally, can appear three-lobed with a central posterior projection and two lateral shoulders.

In mature males, the second antennae are enlarged into paired claspers used to hold females during copulation; mature females lack this modification and instead have short, stout second antennae and an egg-bearing brood pouch, or ovisac, below the swimming appendages. In Pennsylvania identification material, male E. vernalis are described as having straight, smooth second antennae, contrasting with the longer, medially serrated antennae of Eubranchipus holmanii. Separation from Eubranchipus neglectus is more technical: Belk, Mura and Weeks traced the long-standing confusion between the two species to erroneous published drawings of their antennal appendages and treated adult male antennal morphology, together with resting-egg morphology and verified collection records, as evidence supporting their separation.

The female ovisac is compact and set close to the body rather than forming a long trailing egg mass. Older North American descriptions describe the ovisac as nearly circular, with a triangular terminal tip.

The resting eggs, or cysts, are also taxonomically useful because they can be examined when pools are dry and mature specimens are absent. Scanning electron microscope comparisons of North American Eubranchipus cysts show that E. vernalis has a sculptured cyst shell with ridged surface ornamentation, and cyst-shell morphology has been used together with male antennal morphology in separating E. vernalis from similar species.

== Distribution and habitat ==
Eubranchipus vernalis ranges across the eastern North American seaboard, with verified records placed east of the Appalachian Mountains after its separation from Eubranchipus neglectus. Secondary summaries describe the species as occurring in vernal pools across the northeastern United States and adjacent parts of Canada, with records extending southward along the eastern side of the Appalachians. In New England, it is reported as widespread in southern areas, while farther north it is replaced more often by Eubranchipus bundyi.

This species is strongly associated with low-alkalinity, low-conductivity temporary freshwater pools, which fill during the cool season and dry at some point later in the year. These may be supplied by snowmelt, spring rain, runoff, or seasonally elevated groundwater, and can occur in woodland depressions, kettle holes, swales, floodplains, old stream channels, and depressions within larger wetland systems. Suitable habitat must retain water long enough for development, while also drying often enough to prevent permanent fish populations from becoming established, since fish can exert strong predation pressure on the small, slow-moving shrimp in flooded pools. If a pool holds water through winter, it must remain deep enough to avoid freezing through completely, since freezing through may kill developing young.

E. vernalis is rarely reported from water warmer than about 20 °C (68 °F), and northeastern fairy shrimp are most often encountered shortly after ice-out, from mid-March to April, before vernal pools warm later in spring. In a survey of 541 western Massachusetts vernal pools, Eubranchipus fairy shrimp were detected in 34 pools with a mean conductivity of 127 µS/cm, below the survey-wide wetland mean of 200 µS/cm.

Overall, E. vernalis is associated with cool, dilute, low-conductivity seasonal pools; this affinity for soft-water environments is consistent with its occurrence along parts of the eastern coastal plain, where many vernal pools occur in acidic, sandy, or weakly buffered basins. Although not yet cleanly resolved, water hardness may be one factor differentiating closely related eastern Eubranchipus species; for instance, Eubranchipus holmanii, whose range broadly overlaps with that of E. vernalis, has been described as preferring relatively more alkaline habitat.

Because vernal pools may be dry for much of the year, occupied habitat can be difficult to recognize outside the wet season. Basins may appear as leaf-filled depressions in forest floor or meadow settings. For this reason, the presence of fairy shrimp during spring surveys is often treated as biological evidence that a basin is an active vernal pool.

== Life cycle and ecology ==
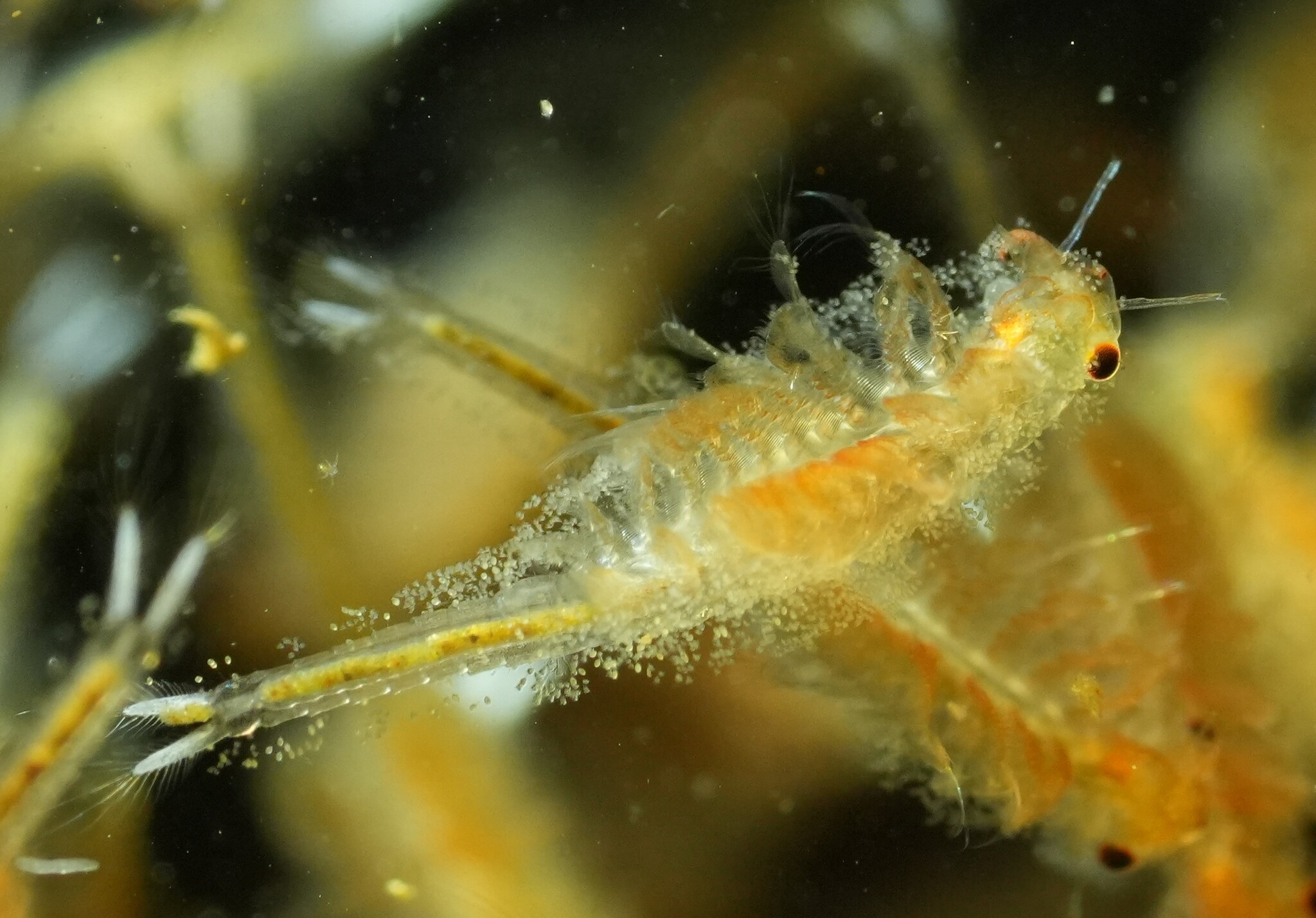
Juvenile E. vernalis during the early spring active phase of a vernal pool.

After pools refill in late winter or early spring, Eubranchipus vernalis hatch as metanauplii and develop through a series of molts and immature instars before reaching the 20-segmented adult form. Individuals mature rapidly, often before the pool dries, warms, or accumulates larger numbers of aquatic predators. Their active life stage is often brief, sometimes lasting only a few weeks in the pool. Female E. vernalis can reach sexual maturity in as little as 14 days after hatching when pools refill late, although average maturity for both sexes has been reported at about 45 days. Adults breed in spring, usually from March to May, before drying or warming ends the active season.

Lifespan is strongly constrained by hydroperiod and temperature. Wild individuals have been reported to live from about 0.5 to 6 months, but survival is constrained by the persistence of water in the pool. E. vernalis is rarely found in water warmer than about 20 to 21 °C (68 to 70 °F), and warm-water exposure has been reported to reduce survival to only a few days.

Mating occurs after males develop enlarged claspers and females carry eggs in the brood pouch. After mating, females release eggs into the water, where they settle into the pool substrate and often become buried among leaf litter. Females have been reported to produce 22 to 44 eggs per clutch, with an average of about 38.

After fertilization, dormant eggs, or cysts, enter diapause, allowing the population to persist through summer drying and unfavorable years. Some eggs have thinner shells and may hatch within the same season, while thicker-shelled overwintering eggs can remain in the cyst bank through drying, freezing, or failed hydroperiods before hatching during a later refilling event.

Hatching occurs after reflooding under suitable environmental conditions, including temperature, light, oxygen availability, and low osmotic conditions. Prior drying or freezing can affect cyst readiness, but these exposures are not necessarily immediate hatching cues by themselves. In some accounts, hatching is reduced when cysts are not first fully dried beforehand. Because only a portion of the cyst bank may hatch in a given flooding event, a pool can appear unoccupied in one year and produce adults in a later spring. This bet-hedging strategy reduces the risk that a failed refilling event, drought, early drying, or otherwise unsuitable hydroperiod eliminates the local population.

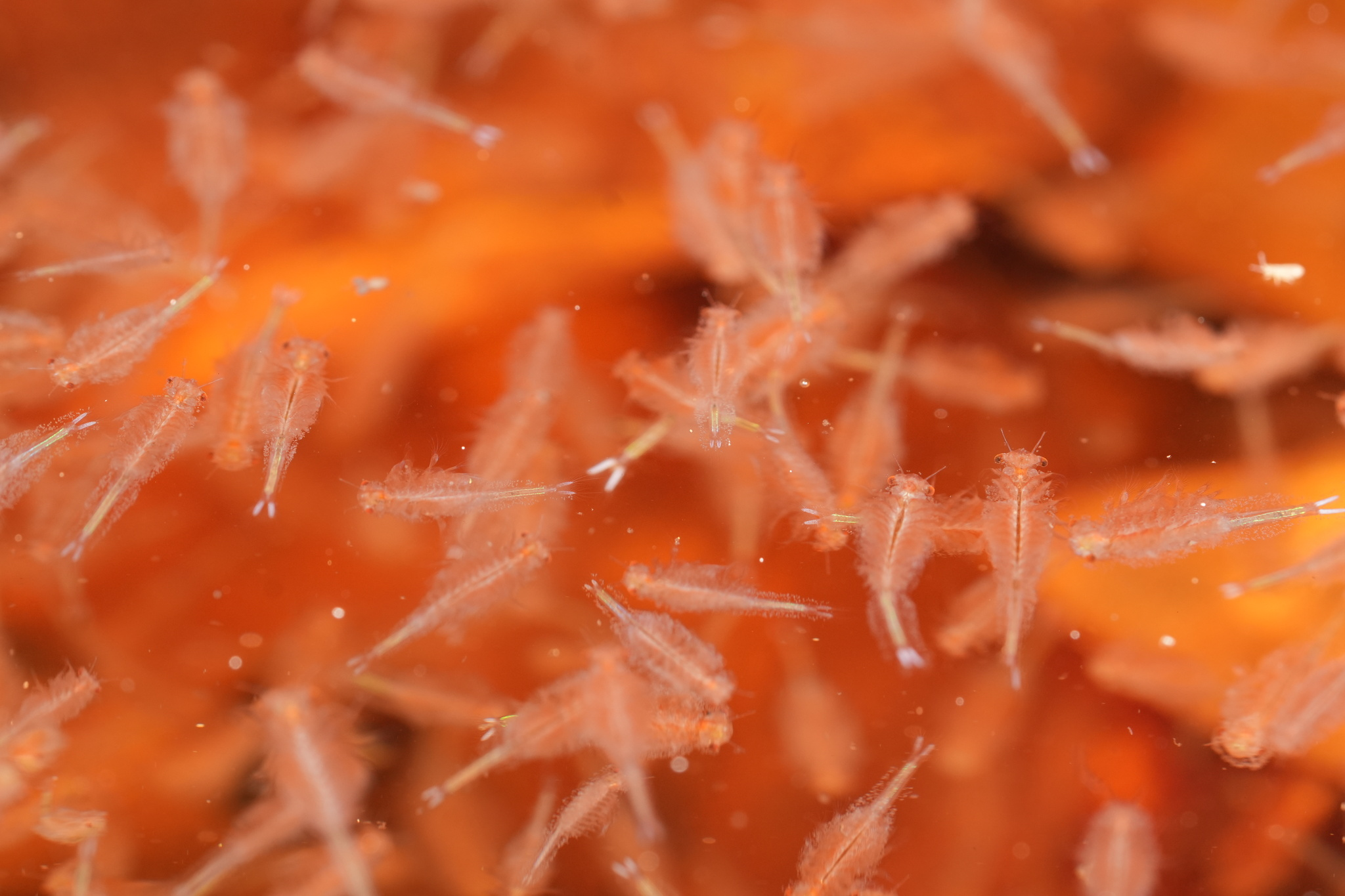
Immature E. vernalis feeding near the water surface in a ground-fed vernal pool near Montauk, New York.

E. vernalis feeds mainly as a benthic scraper and filter feeder. Reported foods include benthic diatoms, filamentous algae such as Draparnaldia, desmids, testate amoebae such as Arcella, and small animal material including flatworm eggs. In spring, vernal pools may contain abundant algal growth, and grazing by fairy shrimp may help reduce algal abundance. By converting algae, microbes and fine suspended material into animal biomass, fairy shrimp become prey for larger vernal-pool animals, including amphibians, waterfowl and aquatic insects.

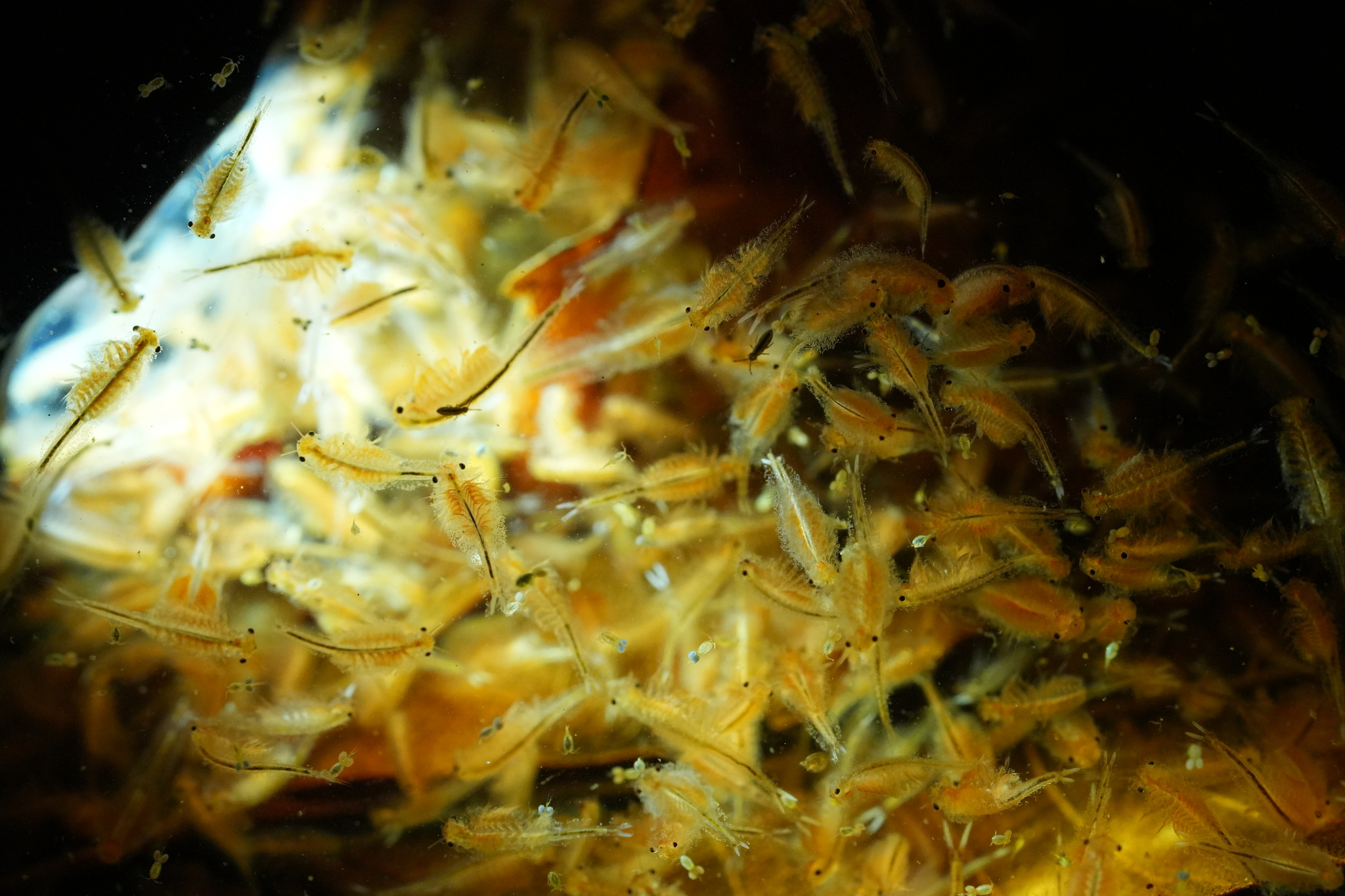
Juvenile E. vernalis aggregating around a submerged flashlight in a Long Island vernal pool.

The fish-free nature of vernal pools is important because fish can consume small, slow-swimming fairy shrimp throughout the flooded stage of the pool. In fishless pools, predation comes instead from seasonal predators such as wood frogs, mole salamanders, caddisfly larvae, predaceous diving beetle larvae, hemipterans and waterfowl. Early hatching may allow fairy shrimp to reproduce before many aquatic insect predators become more abundant later in spring.

Eubranchipus vernalis individuals have been reported to occur nearer the bottom on cloudy days and nearer the surface on sunny days, suggesting that light conditions can affect their position in the water column. In field conditions, juvenile and adult Eubranchipus may also aggregate toward artificial light or bright openings in the water column. Positive phototaxis has been formally described in the genus Eubranchipus, including Holmes's observations on the reaction to light in Eubranchipus ornatus. Positive phototaxis has also been demonstrated experimentally in other anostracans, including Artemia salina.

== Conservation ==
Eubranchipus vernalis has not been evaluated by the IUCN Red List, and broad conservation summaries do not list it as having special federal status in the United States. Conservation attention to the species is therefore mainly habitat-based, through the documentation and protection of temporary, fish-free vernal pools.

State and regional treatment varies. New Jersey lists E. vernalis as a Data Deficient Species of Greatest Conservation Need in its State Wildlife Action Plan.In Pennsylvania and other northeastern states, fairy shrimp are treated as characteristic vernal-pool animals, and their presence is often used as biological evidence that a basin functions as an active seasonal pool. Because occupied pools may be dry outside the spring active period, suitable habitat can be missed during surveys conducted outside the wet season.

The main conservation concerns for E. vernalis follow from its dependence on temporary pools with suitable hydroperiods. Pool filling, drainage alteration, sedimentation, development, and changes to surrounding vegetation can reduce or eliminate seasonal-pool habitat. Hydroperiod change can affect habitat suitability in either direction: pools that dry too early may prevent larvae from completing development, while pools that become too permanent may support fish, which can increase predation pressure on fairy shrimp.

Water-chemistry change may also affect habitat suitability. E. vernalis is associated with cool, dilute, low-conductivity pools, and road salt or other runoff inputs can increase conductivity in seasonal wetlands. These effects are usually addressed through more general vernal-pool protection and watershed management rather than through species-specific legal protection.
