= Streptocephalus gracilis =

Conservation status
- Critically Endangered (IUCN 2.3)

Scientific classification
- Kingdom: Animalia
- Phylum: Arthropoda
- Class: Branchiopoda
- Order: Anostraca
- Family: Streptocephalidae
- Genus: Streptocephalus
- Species: S. gracilis

Binomial name
- Streptocephalus gracilis G. O. Sars, 1898

Species of small freshwater animal

Streptocephalus gracilis is a species of crustacean in family Streptocephalidae. It is endemic to South Africa.
