= Streptocephalus dendrophorus =

Conservation status
- Endangered (IUCN 2.3)

Scientific classification
- Kingdom: Animalia
- Phylum: Arthropoda
- Class: Branchiopoda
- Order: Anostraca
- Family: Streptocephalidae
- Genus: Streptocephalus
- Species: S. dendrophorus

Binomial name
- Streptocephalus dendrophorus Hamer & Appleton, 1993

Species of small freshwater animal

Streptocephalus dendrophorus is a species of crustacean in the family Streptocephalidae. It is endemic to South Africa.
