= Eubranchipus serratus =

Scientific classification
- Kingdom: Animalia
- Phylum: Arthropoda
- Clade: Pancrustacea
- Class: Branchiopoda
- Order: Anostraca
- Family: Chirocephalidae
- Genus: Eubranchipus
- Species: E. serratus

Binomial name
- Eubranchipus serratus Forbes, 1876

Species of small freshwater animal

Eubranchipus serratus, the ethologist fairy shrimp, is a species of branchiopod in the family Chirocephalidae. It is found in North America.
