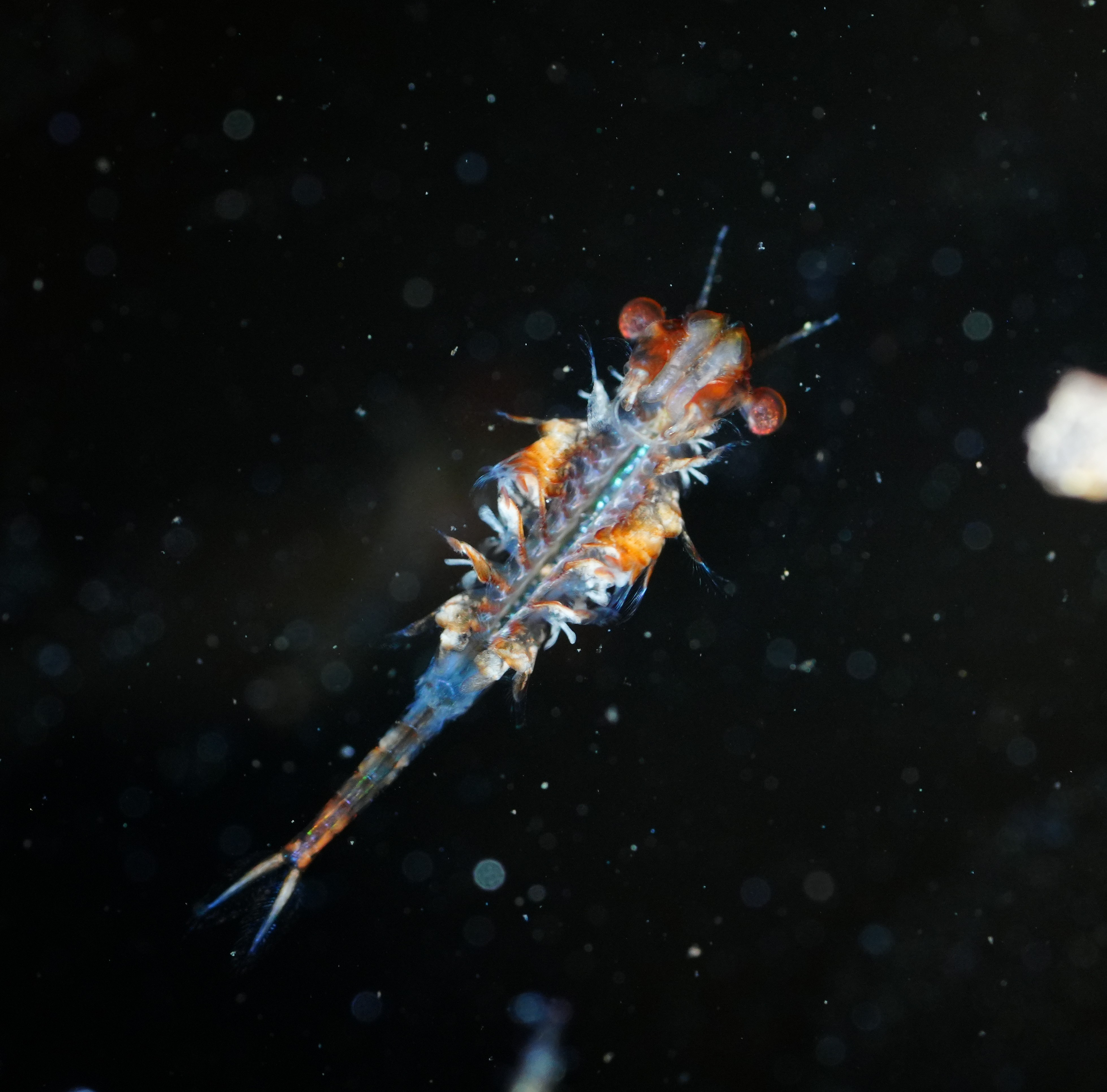
- Adult male Eubranchipus holmanii

Scientific classification
- Kingdom: Animalia
- Phylum: Arthropoda
- Clade: Pancrustacea
- Class: Branchiopoda
- Order: Anostraca
- Family: Chirocephalidae
- Genus: Eubranchipus
- Species: E. holmanii

Binomial name
- Eubranchipus holmanii (Ryder, 1879)
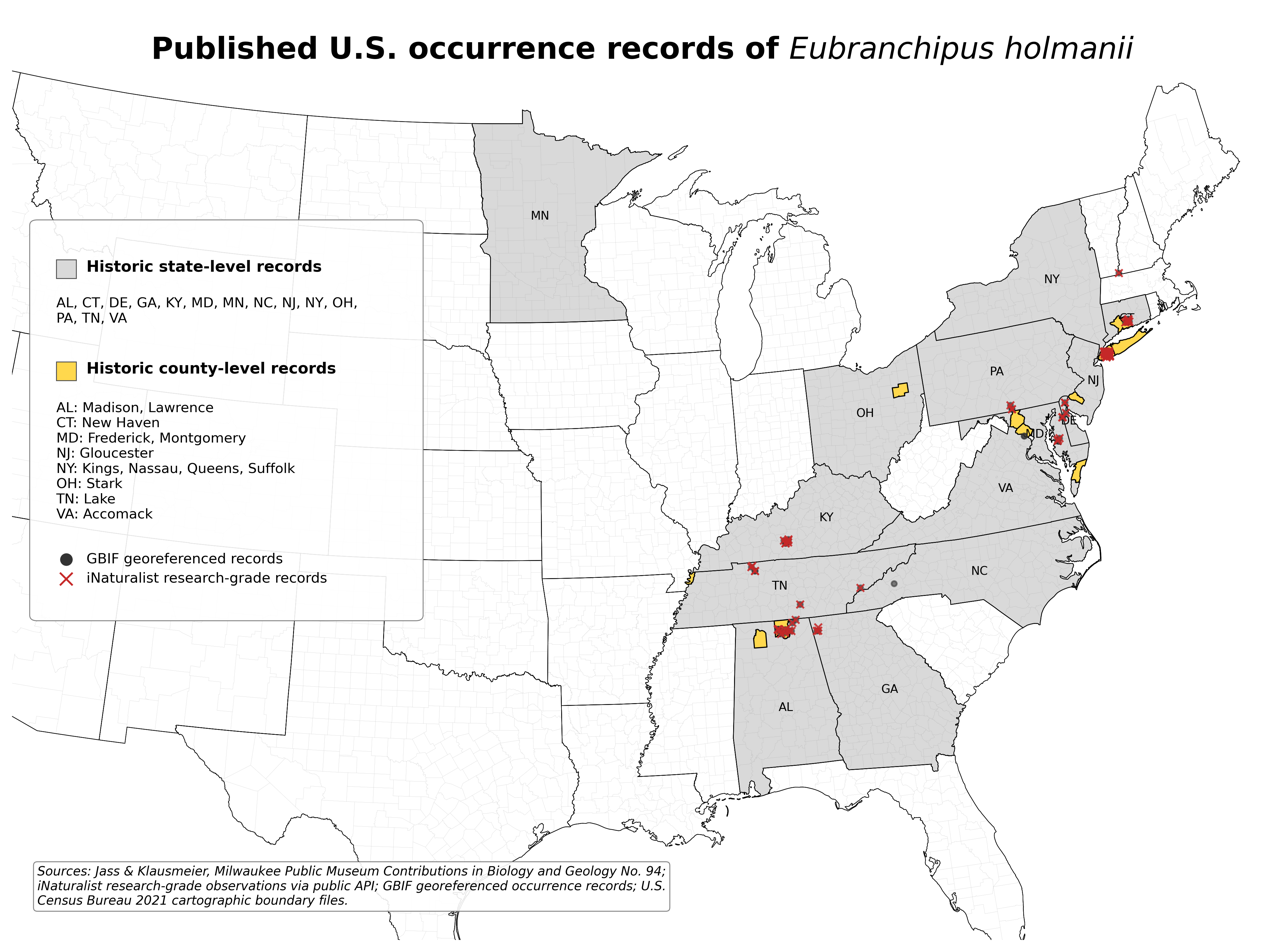
- Historic published occurrence records of Eubranchipus holmanii in the United States

Synonyms
- Pristicephalus comptus Mattox, 1936

= Eubranchipus holmanii =

Species of freshwater fairy shrimp

Eubranchipus holmanii, commonly known as the Holman fairy shrimp and regionally as the eastern fairy shrimp, is a species of freshwater fairy shrimp in the family Chirocephalidae. It inhabits vernal pools and other temporary freshwater wetlands in eastern North America.

== Taxonomy ==
Eubranchipus holmanii was originally described by John A. Ryder in 1879 as Chirocephalus holmani. Spelling has varied between holmani and holmanii in historic taxonomies; major online databases tend to use Eubranchipus holmanii. The later name Pristicephalus comptus Mattox, 1936 has been treated as a synonym of E. holmanii.

== Description ==
Like other fairy shrimp in Chirocephalidae, Eubranchipus holmanii are characterized by reduced maxillae, divided pre-epipodites, and widely separated seminal vesicles. It has an elongate body, lacks a carapace, and swims ventral side upward using leaf-like swimming appendages called phyllopods. Males have enlarged second antennae modified as claspers, while females lack these enlarged claspers and may be recognized when carrying eggs in a brood pouch or ovisac; in E. holmanii, the ovisac is comparatively heavy and pendant, extending across several abdominal segments and often appearing obliquely teardrop-shaped in lateral view.

In live adults, the head often appears dark reddish laterally, with a contrasting pale median band running along the face; this reddish cephalic pigmentation can make the species appear darker than many other regional fairy shrimp. The eyes are large and conspicuous, and adult males have a broadly rounded cephalic profile. The male second antennae are enlarged into thick, pendent claspers, giving the head a heavy, trunk-like appearance. In Ryder's original description and figure of Chirocephalus holmani, the male antennal appendages are shown as unusually elongate, running along much of the proximal antennomeres before curving inward; the distal antennomeres are comparatively slender and incurved.

Adult sexual dimorphism

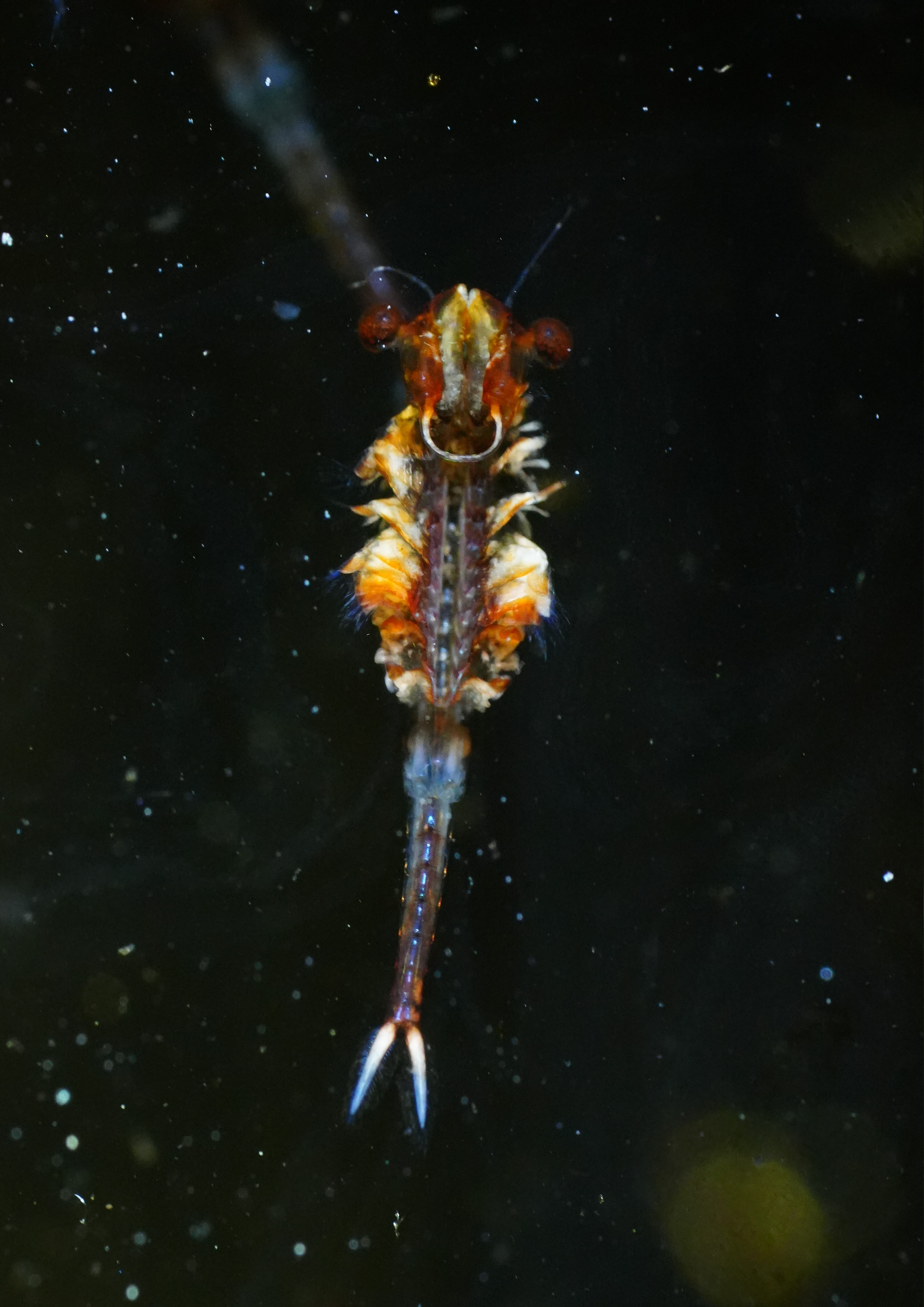
Young adult male, showing enlarged second antennae.

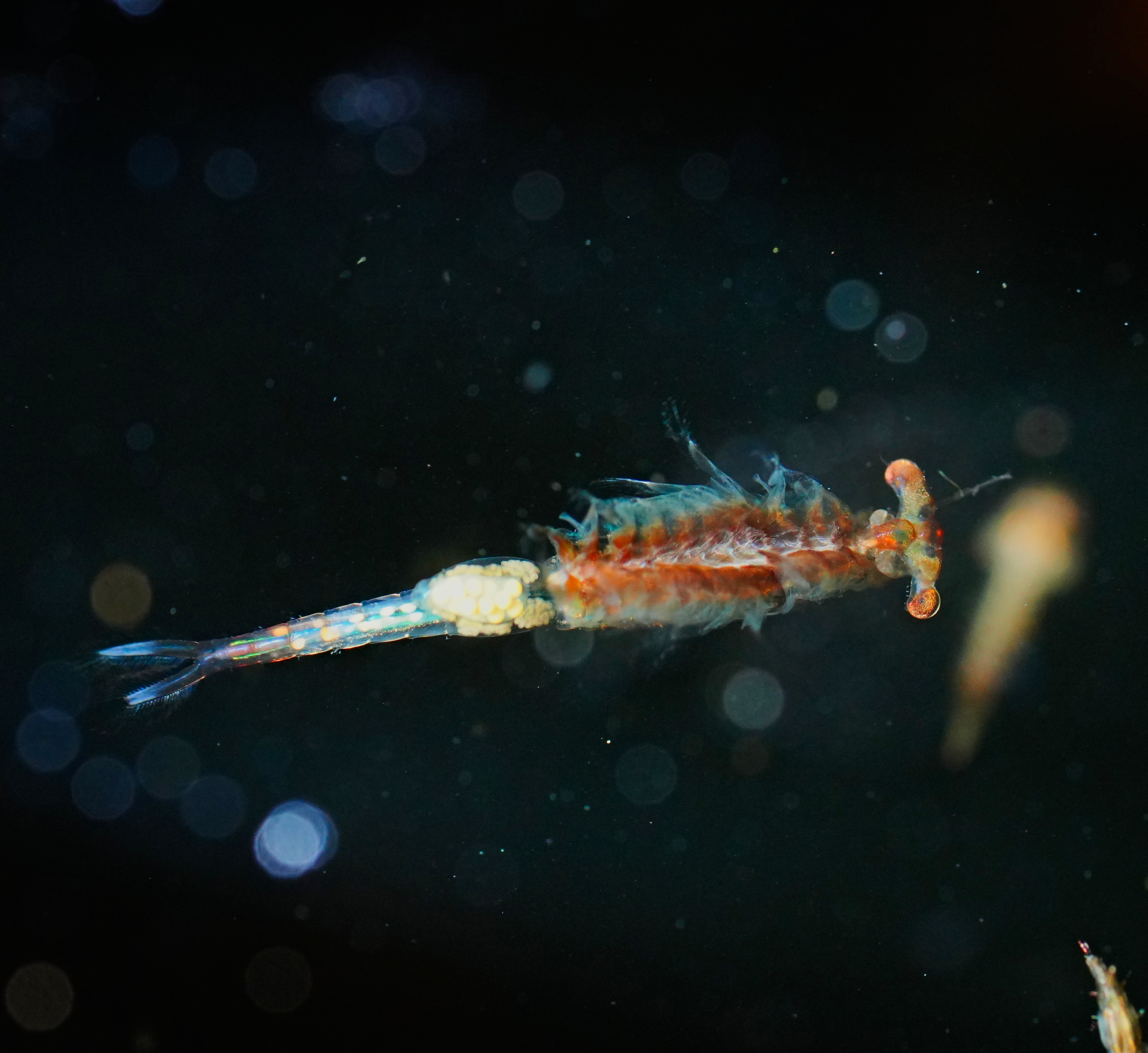
Adult female, with ovisac present near the base of the abdomen.

Adult male and female E. holmanii.

E. holmanii can be distinguished from Eubranchipus vernalis by its longer male antennae with medial serrations, whereas E. vernalis has straighter, smoother antennae.

== Distribution and habitat ==
E. holmanii is reported from parts of the northeastern United States and adjacent Canada. It was originally described from ditches near Woodbury, New Jersey, and is thought to inhabit similar soft vernals along the coastal plain of the eastern seaboard. Belk and Brtek summarized its United States range as extending from New York west to Minnesota and south to northern Alabama.

The species is usually associated with clear, cool to cold, vegetated ephemeral pools with neutral to low pH. These habitats are seasonally flooded and may dry later in the year, allowing fairy shrimp populations to persist through drought-resistant resting eggs.

In New York, a 2025 state assessment reports confirmed records only from western Long Island, while noting that the species may be more common than records currently show.

== Recent rediscovery and records ==
Although Eubranchipus holmanii was described in the nineteenth century, modern records have been sparse in parts of its northeastern range. In Connecticut, the species was reported historically, with the last published pre-rediscovery finding attributed to Dorothy Richardson of Connecticut College in 1953. After this record, the species had not been documented scientifically in Connecticut for about half a century before it was rediscovered in 2008 by Eric A. Lazo-Wasem of the Yale Peabody Museum of Natural History. Lazo-Wasem traced the old Connecticut record through Richardson's work; with help from Connecticut College biologist Robert Askins, he located the Groton vernal pool where the species had previously been found. The rediscovered pool contained both the common Eubranchipus vernalis and specimens of E. holmanii.

The 2008 rediscovery returned E. holmanii to modern regional attention, and later records from western Long Island indicate that the species had also been overlooked elsewhere in the Northeast. In New York, a 2025 state species assessment described E. holmanii as confirmed only from western Long Island, while noting that it is probably more common than records indicate and that species-level identification of fairy shrimp is difficult during the short adult season. The assessment listed 16 New York records from 2014 onward and included mapped research-grade iNaturalist observations in its recent distributional summary.

The long interval before the re-establishment of E. holmanii to its proper range illustrates the difficulty of documenting short-season Anostraca species. Adults are present only briefly in cool-season vernal pools and typically require careful macroscopic examination for proper identification, and as such can remain easily overlooked in general vernal-pool surveys. Older records based on limited locality data can therefore be difficult to relocate.

Regional conservation assessments similarly treat E. holmanii as poorly documented. The Northeast Regional Conservation Synthesis lists it as a Watchlist species with assessment priority, stating that it has only a handful of confirmed locations in the Northeast and remains undersampled.

== Life cycle and ecology ==
In one population study in New Jersey, eggs of E. holmanii generally began hatching between February and March; individuals may even be observed swimming beneath ice-covered pool surfaces. The shrimp undergo rapid development, with sexual maturity reported at about 45 days, and have a maximum lifespan of around 70 days under standard conditions. Females produce drought-resistant eggs, known as cysts, which overwinter in the pool substrate and can survive dry periods before hatching during later flooding events. As in other fairy shrimp, the active life cycle is tied to the temporary hydroperiod of vernal pools, where hatching, growth, mating and egg deposition must occur before the pool dries or conditions become unsuitable.

E. holmanii is a filter feeder, consuming plankton and small suspended organic particles. Anostraca are more broadly known feed on bacteria, microzooplankton and suspended detritus, serving as prey for larger vernal-pool animals, including salamanders, aquatic beetles and hemipterans. The absence of fish is important in occupied pools, as permanent fish populations exert tremendous predation pressure on slow-swimming fairy shrimp.
