= Streptocephalus proboscideus =

Scientific classification
- Kingdom: Animalia
- Phylum: Arthropoda
- Class: Branchiopoda
- Order: Anostraca
- Family: Streptocephalidae
- Genus: Streptocephalus
- Species: S. proboscideus

Binomial name
- Streptocephalus proboscideus (Frauenfeld, 1873)

Synonyms
- List: Branchipus proboscideus Frauenfeld, 1873; Branchipus proboscideus Brauer, 1877; Streptocephalus proboscideus Daday, 1910

Species of freshwater fairy shrimp

Streptocephalus proboscideus, the Sudanese fairy shrimp, is a species of freshwater fairy shrimp found in eastern Africa.

== Description ==
Individuals of Streptocephalus proboscideus may reach as large as 3 centimetres (1.2 in) in length, although individual size is affected by components of the water quality and population density. In both sexes, the thorax, head, and cervical segment combine to form about half of the total length. The abdomen comprises about 38% of the length, and the telson comprising the remaining 12%. Thoracic appendages are used for feeding and for locomotion.

Individual coloration has been described as varying from translucent to nearly black, but color appears to be determined by the animal's diet. Cultured specimens raised on a diet of yeast appear blue-greenish. The individual may have some orange coloration, but in males, only the tips of the cerci, parts of the reproductive organs, and parts of the appendages are consistently orange, while in females only a portion of the telson and the cerci are consistently orange.

Individuals reach their full size after about seven days. Growth occurs in instar stages, and full size occurs after fifteen moults.

The male antennae and the frontal appendages are the best described anatomical features of the species in the Streptocephalidae family, and are used as the main identification criteria of this species.

== Distribution ==
The animal has been identified in eastern Africa, from northern Sudan to southern Africa and Namibia. It was originally described from individuals found in temporary ponds near Khartoum, Sudan, and was for many years considered to be confined to that region. However, the species has been identified from locations in southern Africa and as far north as Mount Uwaynat in northern Sudan and southern Egypt.

== Ecology ==
The Sudanese fairy shrimp is primarily found in shallow, temporary pools of water caused by rain. It is an omnivorous filter feeder than can consume particles that are as small as yeast cells or as large as 0.2 millimetres (0.0079 in). The filter feeding is achieved by the animal beating its thoracic appendages at a rate average 4.3 times per second, causing currents that guide the food into the mouth parts. During feeding, captured food is mechanically swept forward along the food groove into the mouth. Transport of food through the gut is faster in females than in males, with retention times tending to decrease as the concentration of food was increased. The shortest time for food to completely pass through the gut was observed in one experiment using inert glass spheres to be 30 minutes for females and 47 minutes for males. At low food concentrations, gut retention time increases, likely increasing food absorption efficiency. Females have been found to consume nearly five times as much food as males in the same conditions, likely reflecting the higher energy requirements of the sex.

Studies have shown that it exhibits active predatory behavior and has been shown to target algae, ciliates, rotifers, and Volvox. There is some evidence that this species will consume the nauplii of its own species and related species, but it has been shown to avoid Daphnia and Cyclops. In one day, it can effectively filter up to 2 litres (0.44 imp gal; 0.53 US gal) of water, and remove the equivalent of their own body weight each day from their environment.

The species is an active swimmer, and has an optimal temperature range of 27 to 31 °C (81 to 88 °F). It cannot survive in temperatures of 34 °C (93 °F) or above.

== Life cycle ==
Rapid growth and early reproduction are important survival characteristics in organisms that live in temporary habitats like pools of water. Sudanese fairy shrimp exhibit signs of sexual maturity once they reach a size of 9 to 10 millimetres (0.35 to 0.39 in). This can occur in three to five days after hatching. In males, the reproductive system extends from the first to the second or third abdominal segments and consists of paired testes, vasa deferentia, and hemi-penes. In the female, the reproductive system consists of a pair of ovaries, lateral oviductal pouches, and a brood pouch containing an ovisac and shell glands.

As with most fairy shrimp, the Sudanese fairy shrimp reproduces exclusively by laying eggs. As soon as three to five days after hatching, oocytes along the entire length of the ovaries, and their color is highly dependent on the animal's diet. The oocytes pass into the ovisac, where they are eventually fertilized by the male. After fertilization, muscle contractions of the brood pouch cause the cysts to be constantly turned around and coated by secretions from the cell gland until they harden and the shell is formed, and they are ejected from the brood pouch after remaining there for about 50% of the reproductive cycle. The next cycle of ovulation occurs at about the same time the cysts are ready to be ejected. If fertilization fails during a cycle, the unfertilized eggs are expelled from the female. A typical brood cycle lasts from 2.3 to 2.9 days.

The female produces clutches of 100–300 cysts, and may produce as many as 35–40 such clutches in her lifetime, requiring refertilization after each clutch. The spherical cysts are about 250 micrometers in diameter, with a ridged surface divided into many polygonal cells. The cysts are capable of withstanding drying, and before drying, the development of the embryo stops at about 4,000 cells. The cysts have long-term viability, and may lie dormant for several years after the water pools evaporate, hatching when a new pool forms. On average, about a third of all cysts spontaneously hatch without undergoing a drying cycle, with cysts from older females tending to exhibit this behavior more than younger females. Because of the effective filtration rates of fairy shrimp and cannibalistic consumption of nauplii by adults, it is unlikely that any of the spontaneously hatched individuals will survive to adulthood in environments where the population density exceeds about one adult per liter of water, unless population density declines due to environmental pressures or an increase in the volume of water.

Females have been repeatedly observed to only accept copulation with males at times when there are eggs in the oviducts, approximately 15% of the total brood cycle time. Males have been observed to make orienting motions toward any female without regard to her reproductive stage, with reproductive success in the species favoring males which mate with a behavior described as "undiscriminating eagerness".

In laboratory conditions, individuals have lived as long as 9 months, although in their natural habitat, it would be unusual for the habitat to persist for that long.

== Taxonomy and etymology ==
The species was first briefly described as Branchipus proboscideus by Georg Ritter von Frauenfeld in 1873, based on his investigations of an unknown number of specimens. In his publication, he did not make a mention of where he had deposited his original specimens, but in 1921, Otto Pesta described examining one male and one female specimen identified as the type species in the Museum of Natural History in Vienna. One male and four female specimens had been collected in Khartoum by Ernst Marno in 1870 and deposited at that same museum, and may have been the specimens described by Frauenfeld.

The Latin name, Streptocephalus proboscideus, means "twisted head with a proboscis", which refers to a median appendage on the head between the antennae.
