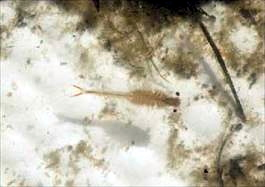

Conservation status
- Endangered (IUCN 2.3)

- Endangered (ESA)

Scientific classification
- Kingdom: Animalia
- Phylum: Arthropoda
- Class: Branchiopoda
- Order: Anostraca
- Family: Streptocephalidae
- Genus: Streptocephalus
- Species: S. woottoni

Binomial name
- Streptocephalus woottoni Eng, Belk & Eriksen, 1990

= Streptocephalus woottoni =

Species of small freshwater animal

Streptocephalus woottoni, with the common name Riverside fairy shrimp, is a rare species of crustacean in the family Streptocephalidae. It is native to Southern California in the United States, and northern Baja California in northwest Mexico.

== Description ==
This fairy shrimp, Streptocephalus woottoni, lives in vernal pools or other seasonal pools at least 30 centimeters in depth, and can be observed in January through March. It feeds on microscopic organisms such as bacteria and protozoa. The eggs are cysts that can tolerate drying and persist in the soil through the dry seasons until pools are formed by rainwater. The shrimp then hatches and completes its life cycle in 7 or 8 weeks. On average the shrimp grow between 10 and 20 millimeters long in a period of 2 to 3 weeks

== Etymology ==
Streptocephalus woottoni takes its name from Dr. Donald M. Wootton who was known for his study and knowledge of phyllopod crustacea. The name was dedicated in 1990.

== Conservation ==
This organism can only be found in five locations in southern California in Riverside County and San Diego County and two in northern Baja California. Some known population occurrences have been extirpated, including the type locality in Murrieta, in the Peninsular Ranges foothills, and Costa Mesa. The shrimp is threatened by the loss, degradation, and fragmentation of its habitat.

Streptocephalus woottoni is a federally listed endangered species of the United States. In December 2012, the United States Fish and Wildlife Service identified 1,724 acres of critical habitat of the shrimp.

== See also ==
- California montane chaparral and woodlands
- Fauna of the California chaparral and woodlands
