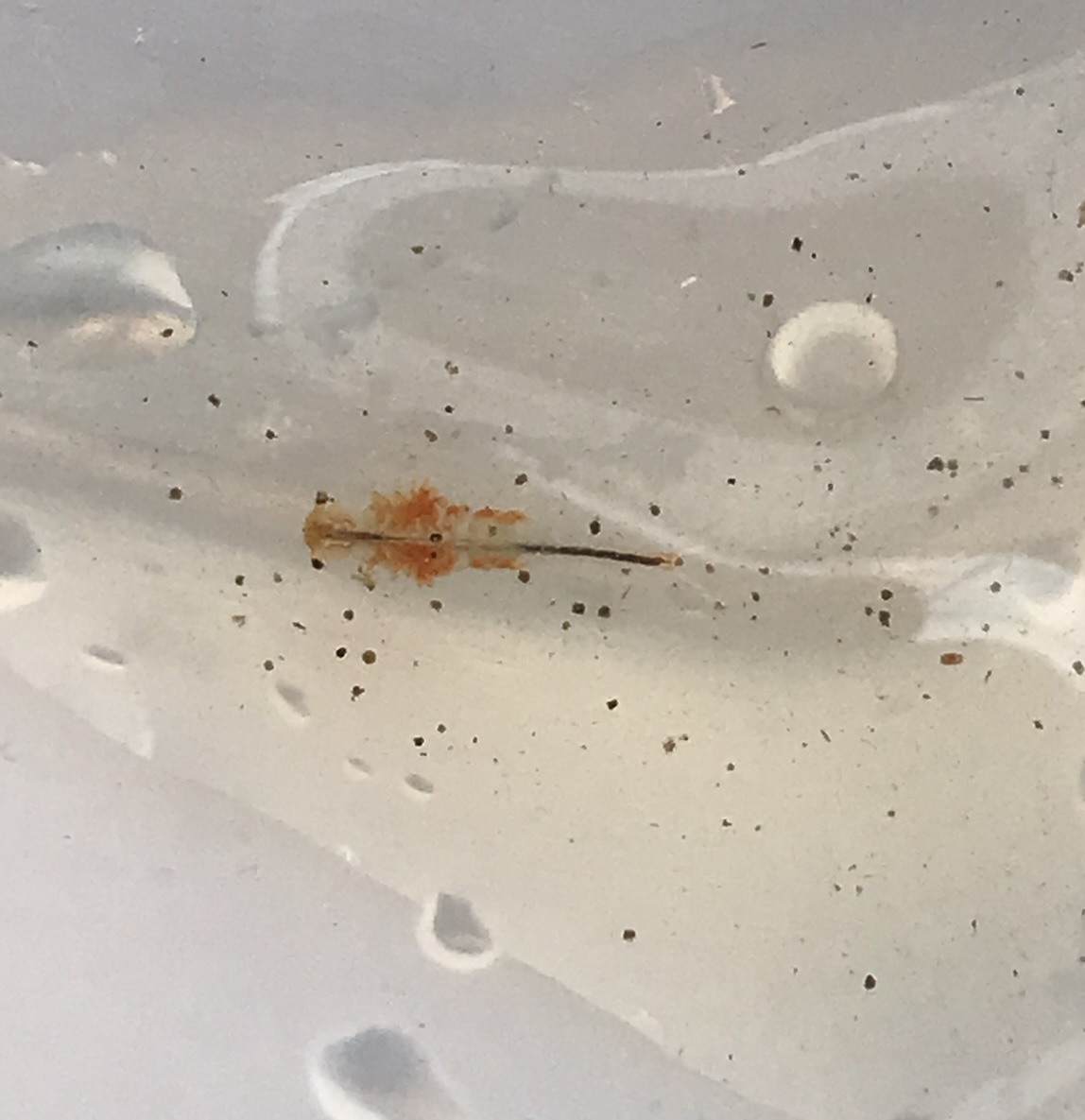
- Adult Eubranchipus intricatus

Scientific classification
- Kingdom: Animalia
- Phylum: Arthropoda
- Clade: Pancrustacea
- Class: Branchiopoda
- Order: Anostraca
- Family: Chirocephalidae
- Genus: Eubranchipus
- Species: E. intricatus

Binomial name
- Eubranchipus intricatus Hartland-Rowe, 1967
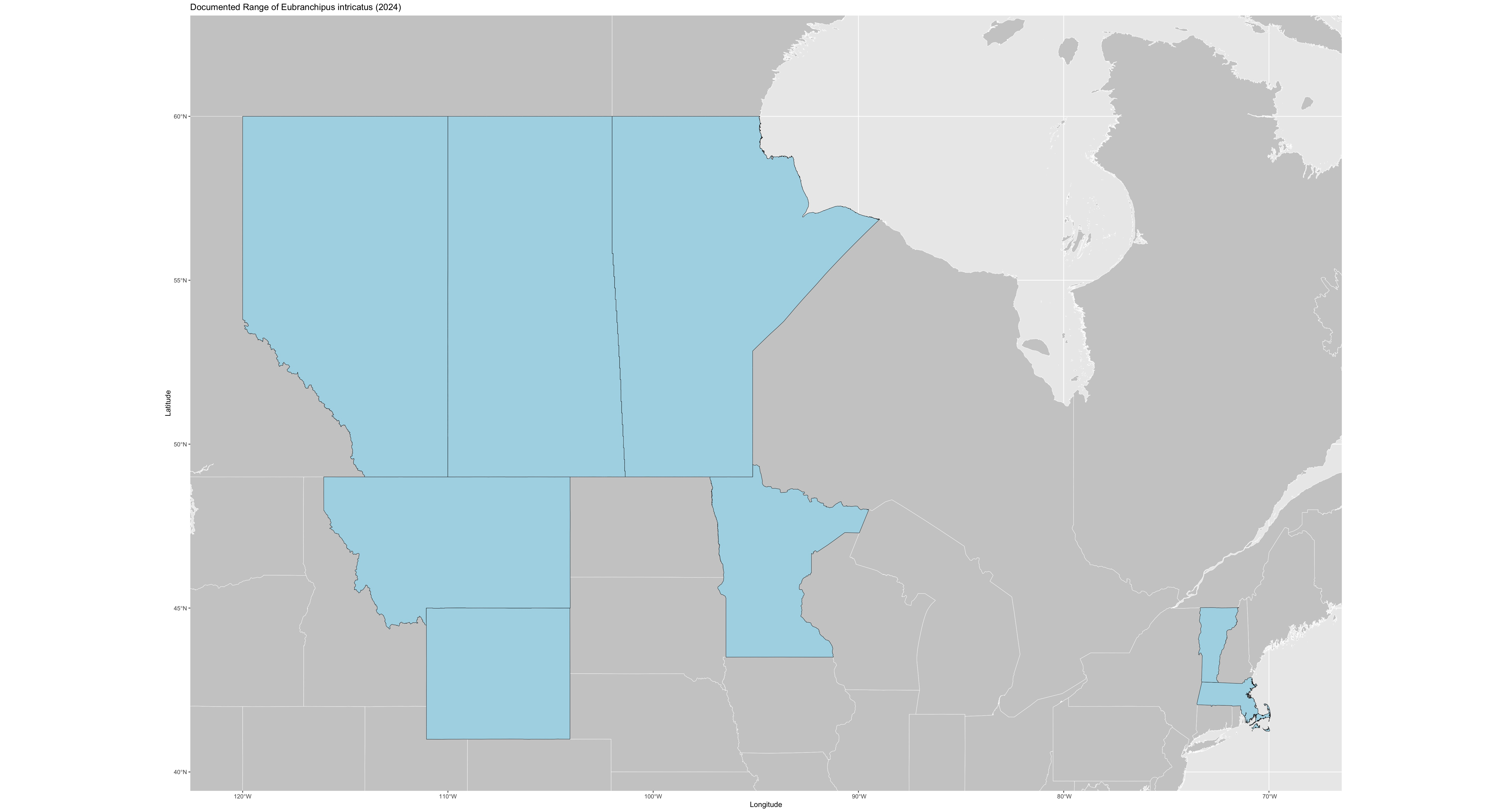
- Known range of Eubranchipus intricatus, as of 2024.

= Eubranchipus intricatus =

Species of crustacean

Eubranchipus intricatus, the intricate or smooth-lipped fairy shrimp, is a species of fairy shrimp in the genus Eubranchipus.

== Range ==
The central prairies of the United States and Canada, with a disjunct eastern population in Vermont and Massachusetts.

== Habitat ==
Wetlands and ephemeral vernal pools.
