= Streptocephalus dendyi =

Conservation status
- Endangered (IUCN 2.3)

Scientific classification
- Kingdom: Animalia
- Phylum: Arthropoda
- Class: Branchiopoda
- Order: Anostraca
- Family: Streptocephalidae
- Genus: Streptocephalus
- Species: S. dendyi

Binomial name
- Streptocephalus dendyi Barnard, 1929

Species of small freshwater animal

Streptocephalus dendyi is a species of crustacean in the family Streptocephalidae. It is endemic to South Africa.
