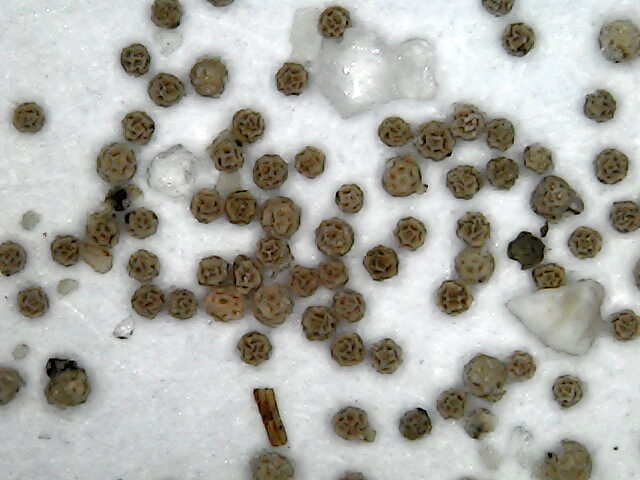
- Eggs of Streptocephalus sirindhornae, 0.1 - 0.3 mm in size

Scientific classification
- Kingdom: Animalia
- Phylum: Arthropoda
- Class: Branchiopoda
- Order: Anostraca
- Family: Streptocephalidae
- Genus: Streptocephalus
- Species: S. sirindhornae

Binomial name
- Streptocephalus sirindhornae Sanoamuang et al., 2000

= Streptocephalus sirindhornae =

Species of small freshwater animal

Streptocephalus sirindhornae is a species of crustacean in the family Streptocephalidae; a genus of freshwater dwelling shrimp belonging to the Anostraca order of Branchiopoda . It is endemic to Thailand, and it was named after Princess Sirindhorn.

== Habitat ==
Streptocephalus sirindhornae inhabit inland freshwater temporary waters, known as vernal pools.

== Reproduction ==
Streptocephalus sirindhornae displays sexual dimorphism, featuring both male and female sexes. The species reproduces sexually, with the male shrimp fertilising the eggs of the female. Once fully formed, the eggs are released by the female shrimp.

The male shrimp features an additional enlarged frontal appendage used to grasp the female during mating.

Furthermore, the female shrimp has a brood pouch attached to the base of the tail and last set of swimming appendages, which is used to hold the eggs (cysts) before and during fertilization, as well as throughout egg development. Once substantially developed, the eggs are then birthed from the brood pouch.

== Behaviour ==
Like other fairy shrimp, S. sirnindhornae share the universal ability to enter diapause, a state of biological dormancy where growth and metabolism are arrested, as an egg (commonly called a cyst). This trait assists in both species dispersal and in overcoming adverse environmental conditions that threaten biological continuity. Once dormant, these cysts can withstand conditions as harsh and diverse as droughts, frosts, hypersaline conditions, complete desiccation, exposure to UV radiation and the vacuum of space.
