= L. occidentalis =

L. occidentalis may refer to:

- Leptochilus occidentalis, a wasp species in the genus Leptochilus
- Leptoglossus occidentalis, the western conifer seed bug, a true bug species native to California, Oregon and Nevada, United States
- Leptotyphlops occidentalis, the Western thread snake
- Linderiella occidentalis, the California fairy shrimp, a shrimp species native to California
- Lepisosteus occidentalis, a gar that lived from the late Cretaceous to Eocene.

== See also ==
- List of Latin and Greek words commonly used in systematic names#O
