= Streptocephalus (Parastreptocephalus) =

Scientific classification
- Kingdom: Animalia
- Phylum: Arthropoda
- Class: Branchiopoda
- Order: Anostraca
- Family: Streptocephalidae
- Genus: Streptocephalus
- Subgenus: Parastreptocephalus; Brendonck & Hamer, 1992

Subgenus of small freshwater animals

Parastreptocephalus is a subgenus of the fairy shrimp genus Streptocephalus, characterised by features of the male antennae and the tetrahedral shape of the eggs. It comprises six species:

- Streptocephalus kaokoensis Barnard, 1929 – Namibia
- Streptocephalus lamellifer Thiele, 1900 – Tanzania
- Streptocephalus queenslandicus Herbert & Timms, 2000 – Queensland
- Streptocephalus siamensis Sanoamuang & Saengphan, 2006 – Thailand
- Streptocephalus sudanicus Daday de Dées, 1910 – Sahel
- Streptocephalus zuluensis Brendonck & Hamer, 1992 – Zimbabwe & South Africa, endangered
