= Streptocephalus guzmani =

Conservation status
- Endangered (IUCN 2.3)

Scientific classification
- Kingdom: Animalia
- Phylum: Arthropoda
- Class: Branchiopoda
- Order: Anostraca
- Family: Streptocephalidae
- Genus: Streptocephalus
- Species: S. guzmani

Binomial name
- Streptocephalus guzmani Maeda-Martínez, Belk, Obregón-Barboza & Dumont, 1995

Species of small freshwater animal

Streptocephalus guzmani is a species of crustacean in the family Streptocephalidae. It is endemic to Mexico.
