= Streptocephalus moorei =

Conservation status
- Critically Endangered (IUCN 2.3)

Scientific classification
- Kingdom: Animalia
- Phylum: Arthropoda
- Class: Branchiopoda
- Order: Anostraca
- Family: Streptocephalidae
- Genus: Streptocephalus
- Species: S. moorei

Binomial name
- Streptocephalus moorei Belk, 1973

Species of small freshwater animal

Streptocephalus moorei is a species of crustacean in the family Streptocephalidae. It is endemic to Mexico.
