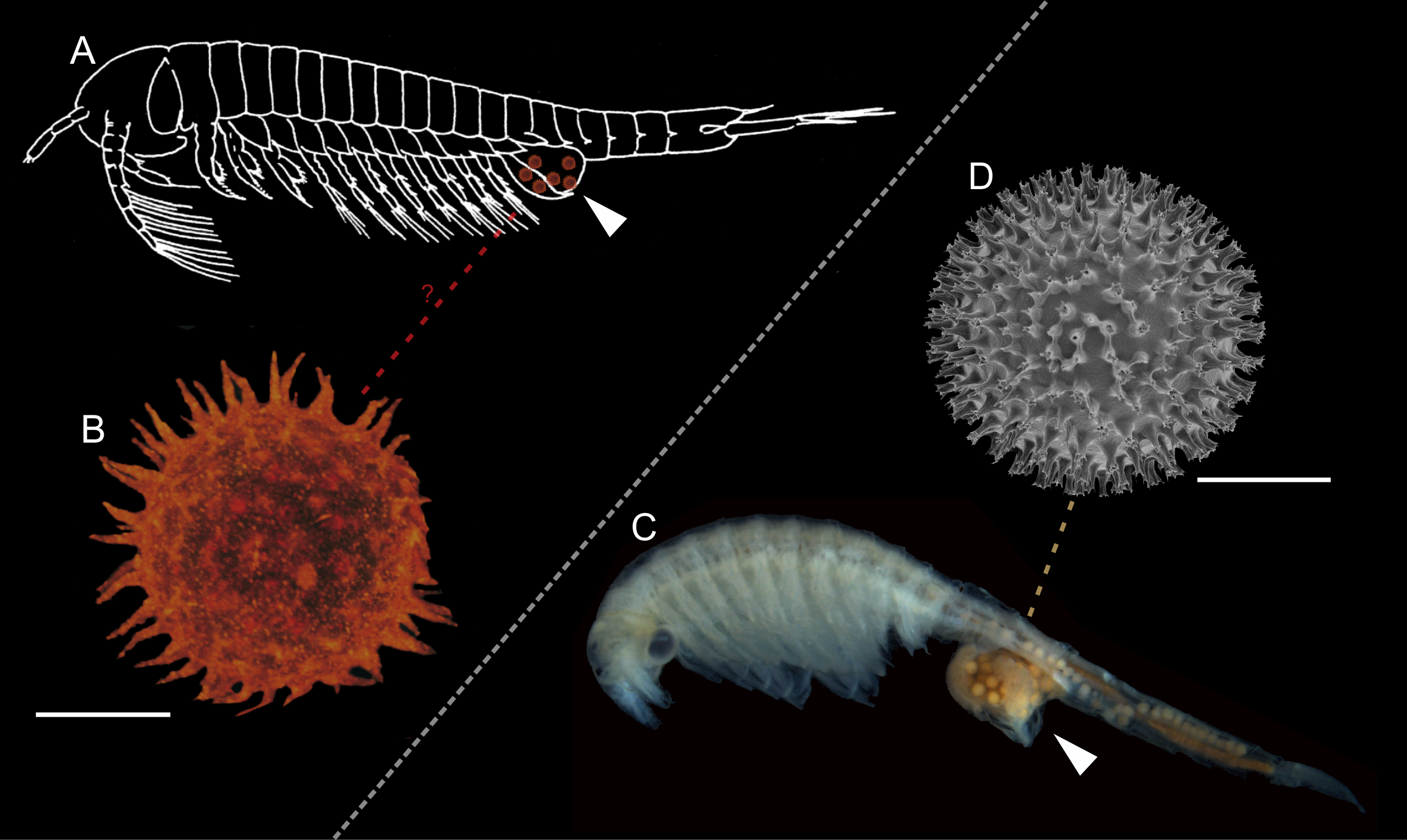
- Linderiella occidentalis (C) and the egg of Linderiella santarosae (D) compared to Lepidocaris rhyniensis

Scientific classification
- Domain: Eukaryota
- Kingdom: Animalia
- Phylum: Arthropoda
- Class: Branchiopoda
- Order: Anostraca
- Family: Chirocephalidae
- Genus: Linderiella; Brtek, 1964

Species
- Linderiella africana Thiéry, 1986; Linderiella massaliensis Thiéry & Champeau, 1988; Linderiella occidentalis (Dodds, 1923); Linderiella santarosae Thiéry & Fugate, 1994; Linderiella baetica Alonso & Garcia-de-Lomas, 2009

= Linderiella =

Genus of small freshwater animals

Linderiella is a genus of fairy shrimp, previously placed in its own family, Linderiellidae, but now usually considered part of the Chirocephalidae. It comprises five species – Linderiella occidentalis and L. santarosae from California, L. africana from the Atlas Mountains in Morocco, L. massaliensis from southeastern France and L. baetica from southern Spain.
