= Streptocephalus kargesi =

Conservation status
- Data Deficient (IUCN 2.3)

Scientific classification
- Kingdom: Animalia
- Phylum: Arthropoda
- Class: Branchiopoda
- Order: Anostraca
- Family: Streptocephalidae
- Genus: Streptocephalus
- Species: S. kargesi

Binomial name
- Streptocephalus kargesi Spicer, 1985

Species of small freshwater animal

Streptocephalus kargesi is a species of crustacean in the family Streptocephalidae. It is endemic to Mexico.
