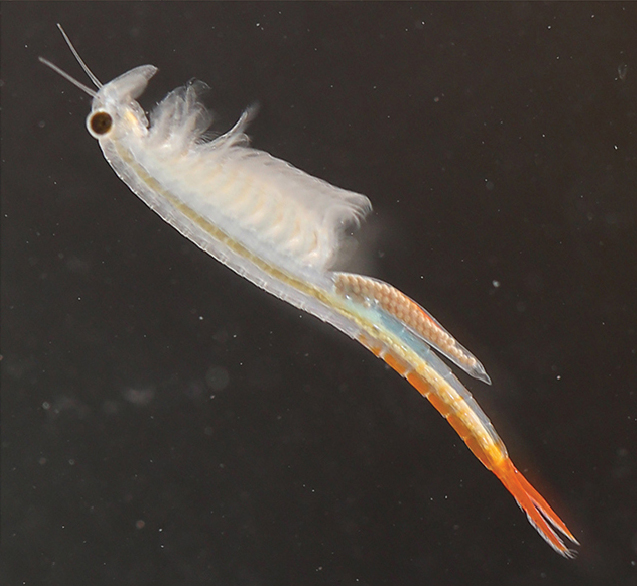
- Streptocephalus shinsawbuae female

Scientific classification
- Kingdom: Animalia
- Phylum: Arthropoda
- Class: Branchiopoda
- Order: Anostraca
- Suborder: Anostracina
- Family: Streptocephalidae; Daday, 1910
- Genus: Streptocephalus; W. Baird, 1852

= Streptocephalus =

Genus of small freshwater animals

Streptocephalus is a genus of fairy shrimp found in temporary fresh waters in Africa, Australia, Eurasia, and Central and North America, following its ancient origin in Gondwana. It contains the following species:

- Streptocephalus annanarivensis Thiele, 1907
- Streptocephalus antillensis Mattox, 1950
- Streptocephalus archeri Sars, 1896
- Streptocephalus bidentatus Hamer & Appleton, 1993
- Streptocephalus bimaris Gurney, 1909
- Streptocephalus bourquinii Hamer & Appleton, 1993
- Streptocephalus bouvieri Daday, 1908
- Streptocephalus cafer (Lovén, 1847)
- Streptocephalus caljoni Beladjal, Mertens & Dumont, 1996
- Streptocephalus cirratus Daday, 1908
- Streptocephalus cladophorus Barnard, 1924
- Streptocephalus coloradenis Dodds, 1915
- Streptocephalus coomansi Brendonck & Belk, 1993
- Streptocephalus dendrophorus Hamer & Appleton, 1993
- Streptocephalus dendyi Barnard, 1929
- Streptocephalus dichotomus Baird, 1860
- Streptocephalus distinctus Thiele, 1907
- Streptocephalus dorothae Mackin, 1942
- Streptocephalus dregei G. O. Sars, 1899
- Streptocephalus echinus Bond, 1934
- Streptocephalus gracilis G. O. Sars, 1898
- Streptocephalus guzmani Maeda-Martínez et al., 1995
- Streptocephalus henridumontis Maeda-Martínez & Obregón-Barboza, 2005
- Streptocephalus indistinctus Barnard, 1924
- Streptocephalus kaokoensis Barnard, 1929
- Streptocephalus kargesi Spicer, 1985
- Streptocephalus lamellifer Thiele, 1900
- Streptocephalus linderi W. G. Moore, 1966
- Streptocephalus longimanus Bond, 1934
- Streptocephalus mackini W. G. Moore, 1966
- Streptocephalus macrourus Daday, 1908
- Streptocephalus mattoxi Maeda-Martínez et al., 1995
- Streptocephalus moorei Belk, 1973
- Streptocephalus namibiensis Hamer & Brendonck, 1993
- Streptocephalus neumanni Thiele, 1904
- Streptocephalus ovamboensis Barnard, 1924
- Streptocephalus papillatus G. O. Sars, 1906
- Streptocephalus potosinensis Maeda-Martínez et al., 1995
- Streptocephalus proboscideus (Frauenfeld, 1873)
- Streptocephalus purcelli G. O. Sars, 1898
- Streptocephalus reunionensis Thiéry & Champeau, 1994
- Streptocephalus rothschildi Daday, 1908
- Streptocephalus rubricaudatus (Klunzinger, 1867)
- Streptocephalus rugosus Brehm, 1960
- Streptocephalus sahyadriensis Rogers & Padhye, 2014
- Streptocephalus sealii Ryder, 1879
- Streptocephalus shinsawbuae Shu, Rogers, Chen & Sanoamuang, 2018
- Streptocephalus siamensis Sanoamuang & Saengphan, 2006
- Streptocephalus similis Baird, 1852
- Streptocephalus simplex Gurney, 1906
- Streptocephalus sirindhornae Sanoamuang et al., 2000
- Streptocephalus spinicaudatus Hamer & Appleton, 1993
- Streptocephalus spinifer Gurney, 1906
- Streptocephalus spinosus Daday, 1908
- Streptocephalus sudanicus Daday, 1910
- Streptocephalus texanus Packard, 1871
- Streptocephalus thomasbowmani Maeda-Martínez & Obregón-Barboza, 2005
- Streptocephalus torvicornis (Waga, 1842)
- Streptocephalus trifidus Hartland-Rowe, 1969
- Streptocephalus vitreus (Brauer, 1877)
- Streptocephalus wirminghausi Hamer, 1994
- Streptocephalus woottoni Eng et al., 1990
- Streptocephalus zeltneri Daday, 1910
- Streptocephalus zuluensis Brendonck & Hamer, 1992
