= Streptocephalus sealii =

Scientific classification
- Domain: Eukaryota
- Kingdom: Animalia
- Phylum: Arthropoda
- Class: Branchiopoda
- Order: Anostraca
- Family: Streptocephalidae
- Genus: Streptocephalus
- Species: S. sealii

Binomial name
- Streptocephalus sealii Ryder, 1879

Synonyms
- Streptocephalus floridanus Packard, 1880

Species of small freshwater animal

Streptocephalus sealii, the spiny-tail fairy shrimp, is a species of branchiopod in the family Streptocephalidae. It is found in Central America and North America.

== Subspecies ==
These two subspecies belong to the species Streptocephalus sealii:

- Streptocephalus sealii coloradensis Ryder
- Streptocephalus sealii sealii
