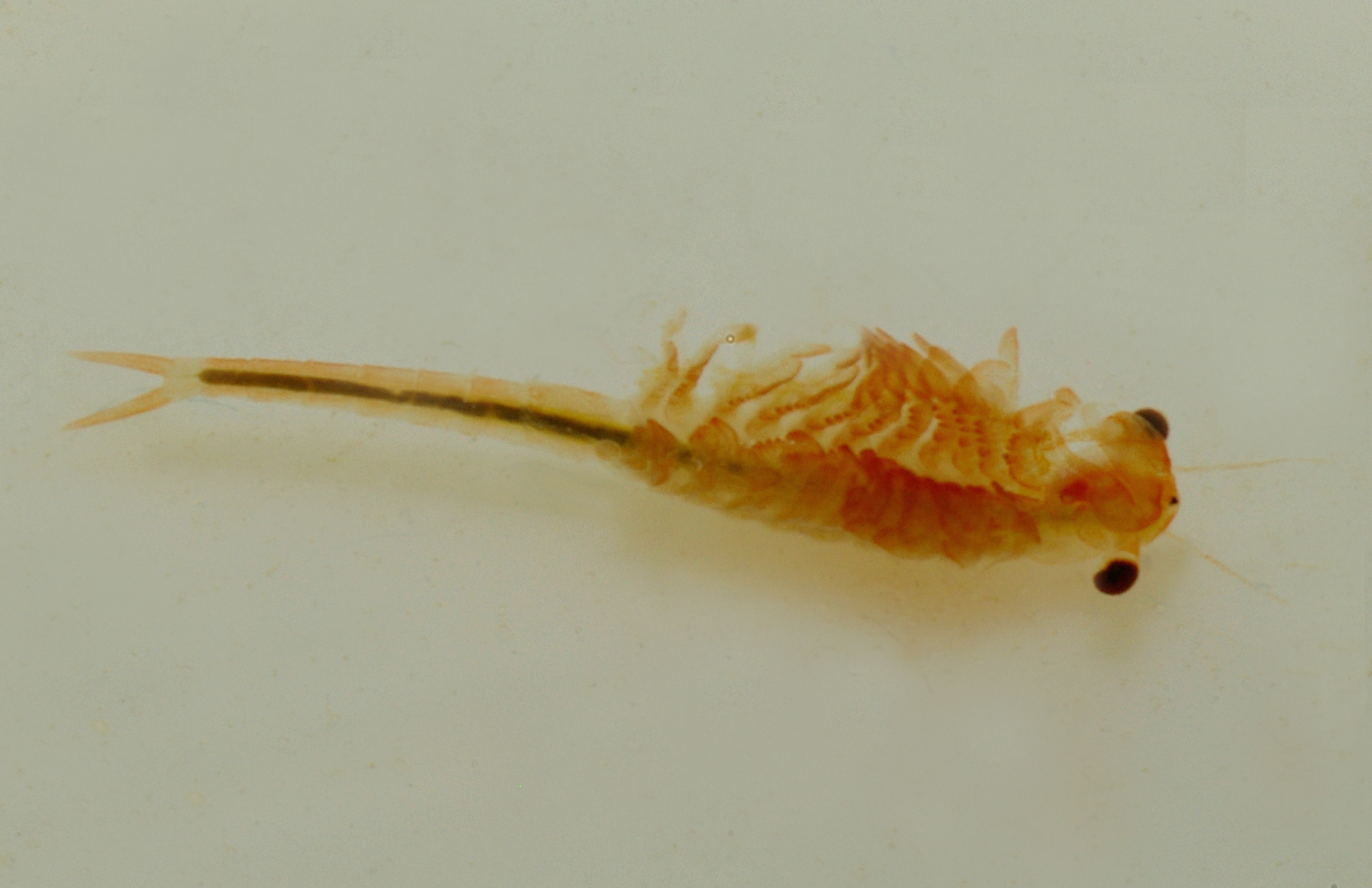

Scientific classification
- Domain: Eukaryota
- Kingdom: Animalia
- Phylum: Arthropoda
- Class: Branchiopoda
- Order: Anostraca
- Family: Chirocephalidae
- Genus: Eubranchipus; Verrill, 1870

Synonyms
- Chirocephalopsis Daday de Dées, 1910

= Eubranchipus =

Genus of small freshwater animals

Eubranchipus is a genus of brine shrimp and fairy shrimp in the family Chirocephalidae. There are 21 described species in Eubranchipus. (see also)

== Species ==
According to the World Register of Marine Species (January 2025), the genus contains the following species:

- Eubranchipus asanumai Takahashi, 2018
- Eubranchipus birostratus (Fischer, 1851)
- Eubranchipus bundyi Forbes, 1876
- Eubranchipus claviger (Fischer, 1851)
- Eubranchipus grubii (Dybowski, 1860)
- Eubranchipus hankoi (Dudich, 1927)
- Eubranchipus hatanakai Takahashi & Hamasaki, 2018
- Eubranchipus hesperius Rogers, 2014
- Eubranchipus holmanii (Ryder, 1879)
- Eubranchipus intricatus Hartland-Rowe, 1967
- Eubranchipus khankanus Takahashi & Hamasaki, 2018
- Eubranchipus moorei Brtek, 1967
- Eubranchipus neglectus Garman, 1926
- Eubranchipus oregonus Creaser, 1930
- Eubranchipus ornatus Holmes, 1910
- Eubranchipus rostratus (Daday, 1910)
- Eubranchipus serratus Forbes, 1876 (ethologist fairy shrimp)
- Eubranchipus stegosus Rogers, Jensen & Floyd, 2004
- Eubranchipus uchidai (Kikuchi, 1957)
- Eubranchipus vernalis (Verrill, 1869) (eastern fairy shrimp)
- Eubranchipus vladimiri Vekhov & Vekhov, 1992
