= Isaac-Bénédict Prévost =

French theologian and naturalist (1755–1819)

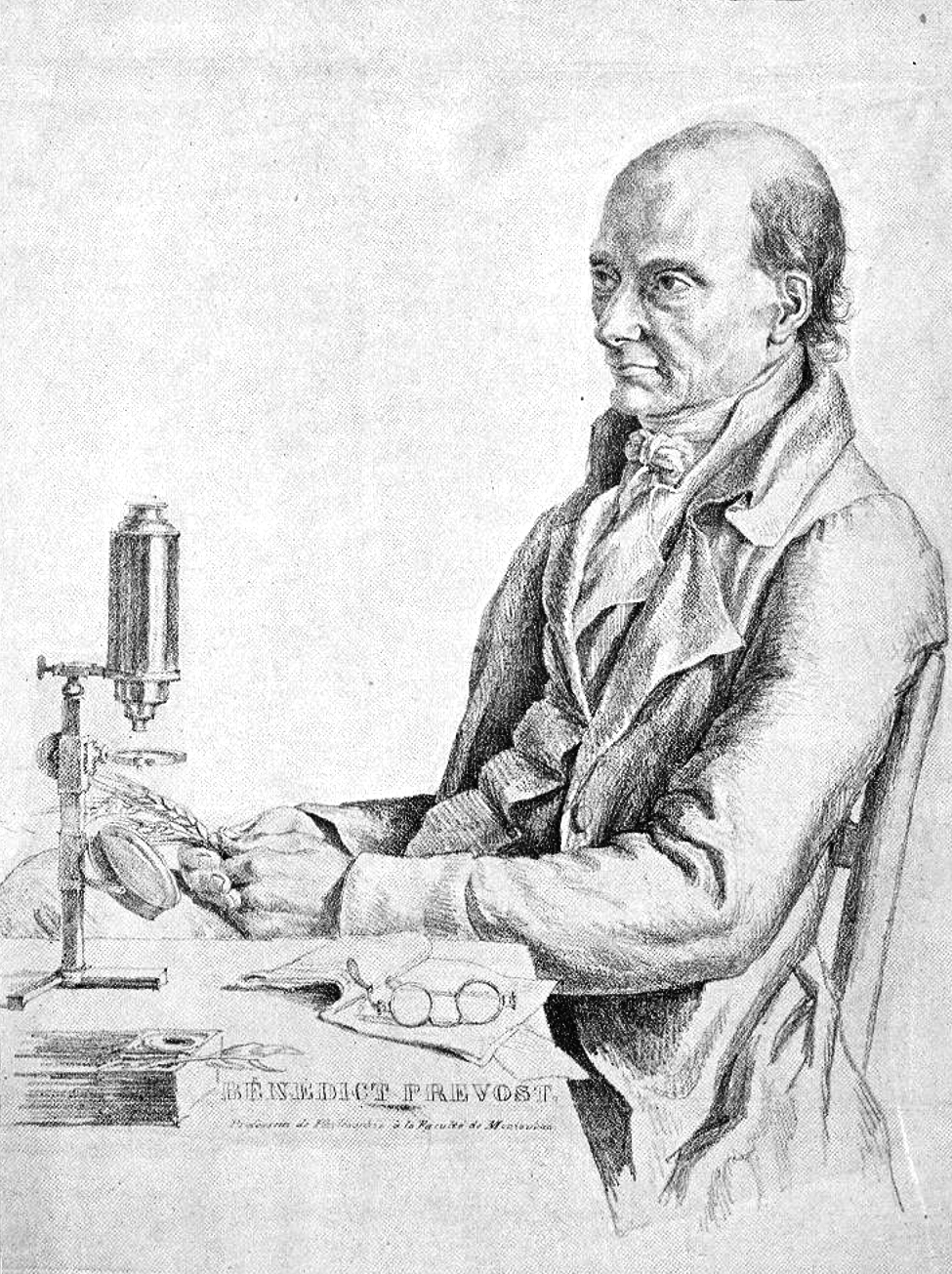
Portrait by Prosper Bernard Debia (1791-1876)

Isaac-Bénédict Prévost (7 August 1755 – 18 June 1819) was a Swiss Protestant theologian and naturalist who was one of the first to identify fungal infection of plants and to find treatments to avoid them.

Prévost was born in Geneva to Jean-Jacques Prévost and Marie-Élisabeth Henri. A cousin was the ophthalmologist Pierre Prévost. Little is known of his early life but he chose science to a career in business after apprenticing in a grocery. He became interested in science after reading the work of the astronomer Duc-la-Chapelle. In 1777, he became a private tutor to the sons of Delmas in Montauban. He founded a society for science in Montauban. In 1807 he identified bunt on wheat as being caused by fungi and suggested that it could be controlled by treating the seeds with copper sulphate. He published his findings in Mémoire sur la cause immédiate de la carie oú charbon desblés, et de plusieurs autres maladies des plantes, et sur les préservatifs de la carie (Paris, 1807). He made microscope observations on the germination of the spores of the fungus which was later called Tilletia caries. He determined that the spores needed humidity but dismissed the idea that the disease itself was caused by climatic factors as was then believed. His work was however dismissed by scientists in higher positions such as Henri-Alexandre Tessier. Despite this the farmers around Switzerland followed the method of seed treatment and found it effective. In 1810 he became professor of philosophy at the Faculte de Theologie Protestante, a position he obtained with a recommendation of Marc-Auguste Pictet who wrote to Georges Cuvier. In 1812 he received a doctorate in theology from the Toulouse Academy. Prevost became ill between 1803 and 1804 and died in 1819 in Montauban following "ataxic fever".
