= Ralph W. Dexter =

Ralph W. Dexter (April 7, 1912 in Gloucester, Massachusetts – October 29, 1991) was a professor of Biology at Kent State University in Kent, Ohio. He published over 300 articles on the ecology of marine communities, including crustaceans, mollusks, insects, and birds. He also published many articles on the history of early American naturalists.

Dr. Dexter spent many years conducting research on the chimney swift from the rooftops of various buildings on the Kent State campus. The university honored his research by featuring the chimney swift on its official seal.

Dr. Dexter was awarded many honors as a teacher and scientist, including the Outstanding Faculty Member award and the President’s Medal. He received the prestigious President's Medal from Kent State on May 15, 1977 based on his singular leadership in the field of biology in Ohio, prolific scholarship and unswerving devotion to Kent State University.

Dr. Dexter died in 1991 at the age of 79.
