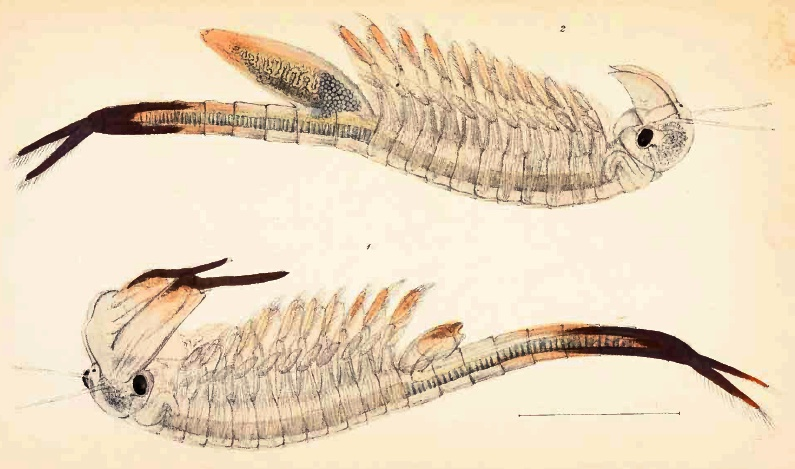
- Chirocephalus diaphanus

Scientific classification
- Domain: Eukaryota
- Kingdom: Animalia
- Phylum: Arthropoda
- Class: Branchiopoda
- Order: Anostraca
- Suborder: Anostracina
- Family: Chirocephalidae; Daday de Dées, 1910

Synonyms
- Linderiellidae Brtek, 1964; Polyartemiidae Simon, 1886

= Chirocephalidae =

Family of small freshwater animals

Chirocephalidae is a family of fairy shrimp, characterised by a reduced or vestigial maxilla, more than two setae on the fifth endite, divided pre-epipodites and widely separated seminal vesicles. It consists of the following eight genera, including the genera formerly placed in the families Linderiellidae and Polyartemiidae:

- Artemiopsis G. O. Sars, 1897
- Branchinectella Daday de Dées, 1910
- Chirocephalus Prévost, 1820
- †Dexteria Brtek, 1965
- Eubranchipus Verrill, 1870
- Linderiella Brtek, 1964
- Polyartemia Fischer, 1851
- Polyartemiella Daday de Dées, 1909
