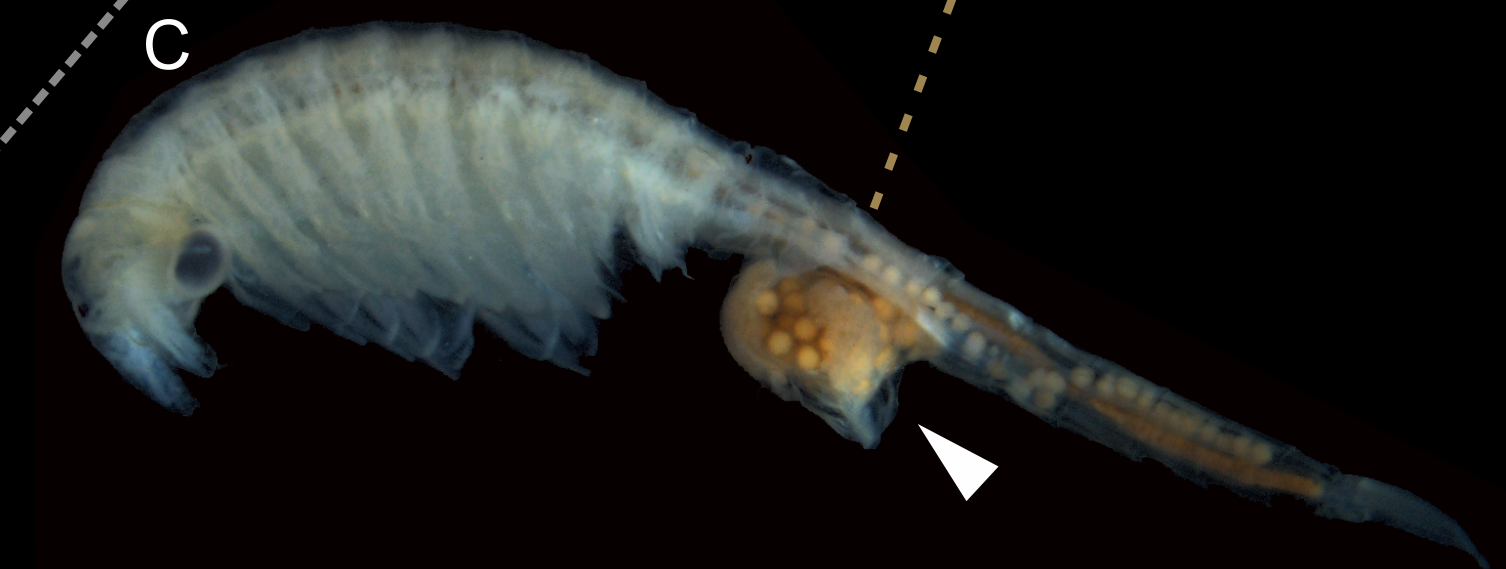

Conservation status
- Near Threatened (IUCN 2.3)

- Imperiled (NatureServe)

Scientific classification
- Kingdom: Animalia
- Phylum: Arthropoda
- Class: Branchiopoda
- Order: Anostraca
- Family: Chirocephalidae
- Genus: Linderiella
- Species: L. occidentalis

Binomial name
- Linderiella occidentalis (Dodds, 1923)

Synonyms
- Branchinecta occidentalis Dodds, 1923; Eubranchipus occidentalis (Dodds, 1923); Pristicephalus occidentalis (Dodds, 1923)

= Linderiella occidentalis =

Species of small freshwater animal

Linderiella occidentalis (the California fairy shrimp or California linderiella) is a species of fairy shrimp native to California. It is a small (about 1 cm long) crustacean in the family Chirocephalidae. It has a delicate elongated body, large stalked compound eyes, no carapace, and eleven pairs of swimming legs. It glides gracefully upside down, swimming by beating its legs in a complex, wavelike movement that passes from front to back. Like other fairy shrimp, L. occidentalis feeds on algae, bacteria, protozoa, rotifers and detritus.

Most fairy shrimp found in California belong to the family Branchinectidae. These include the threatened vernal pool fairy shrimp, which is often found in the same pools. California fairy shrimp are smaller than Branchinecta and have distinctive red eyes.

== Life cycle ==
California fairy shrimp tend to live in large, fairly clear vernal pools and lakes. However, they can survive in clear to turbid water with pH of 6.1–8.5, and they have been found in very small pools. They are tolerant of water temperatures from 5–29 °C (41–84 °F), making them the most heat tolerant fairy shrimp in California.

Female fairy shrimp carry their eggs in a ventral brood sac. The eggs are either dropped to the pool bottom or remain in the brood sac until the mother dies and sinks. When the pool dries out, so do the eggs. They remain in the dry pool bed until rains and other environmental stimuli hatch them.

Resting fairy shrimp eggs are known as cysts. They are capable of withstanding heat, cold and prolonged desiccation. When the pools refill, some, but not all, of the cysts may hatch. The cyst bank in the soil may contain cysts from several years of breeding.

Average time to maturity is about forty-five days. Thirty-one seems to be the minimum time required, which is the longest minimum for any Central Valley fairy shrimp. Adults have been collected from late December to early May.

== Distribution ==
The California fairy shrimp is the most common fairy shrimp in the Central Valley. It has been documented on most land forms, geologic formations and soil types supporting vernal pools in California, at altitudes as high as 1,150 meters (3,770 ft) above sea level.

When the United States Fish and Wildlife Service listed the vernal pool fairy shrimp, vernal pool tadpole shrimp, conservancy fairy shrimp and longhorn fairy shrimp, they stated that surveys conducted in 1993 and other information that had become available to the Service indicated that the range extends from Shasta County south to Fresno County and across the valley to the Coast and Transverse Ranges from Willits in Mendocino County south to near Sulfur Mountain in Ventura County.

== Conservation ==
As with all vernal pool species that occur in the Central Valley, suitable habitat for the California fairy shrimp has declined dramatically over the past century. Continued conversion of grassland-vernal pool ecosystems to urban or agricultural uses is the largest threat to survival of the California fairy shrimp.

In addition to direct habitat loss, California fairy shrimp populations have declined because of a variety of activities that render existing vernal pools unsuitable for the species. Alteration of vernal pool hydrology, in particular, can dramatically degrade vernal pool habitats. Vernal pool hydrology can be altered by a variety of activities, including the construction of roads, trails, ditches, or canals that can block the flow of water into, or drain water away from the vernal pools and vernal pool complexes.

Populations have also declined as a result of water contamination. Vernal pool crustaceans are highly sensitive to the water chemistry of their habitats. Contamination of vernal pools may injure or kill them. Toxic chemicals, such as petroleum products, pesticides, herbicides, fertilizers and soap may wash into vernal pools during development of adjacent areas.

In addition to altered hydrology and contamination, California fairy shrimp habitats have declined as a result of a variety of other incompatible land uses including off-road vehicle use, dumping, invasion of non-native species, vandalism, erosion and sedimentation.

It was proposed for listing along with the vernal pool fairy shrimp, vernal pool tadpole shrimp, conservancy fairy shrimp and longhorn fairy shrimp. However the proposal was withdrawn when the other four species were listed. The Federal Register notice stated "The Service has considered the additional information and has determined that the California linderiella is not likely to become either endangered or threatened throughout all or a significant portion of its range in the foreseeable future, and it does not qualify for listing under the Act.
