= Branchinecta lutulenta =

Conservation status
- Critically Imperiled (NatureServe)

Scientific classification
- Kingdom: Animalia
- Phylum: Arthropoda
- Clade: Pancrustacea
- Class: Branchiopoda
- Order: Anostraca
- Family: Branchinectidae
- Genus: Branchinecta
- Species: B. lutulenta

Binomial name
- Branchinecta lutulenta Rogers and Hill, 2013

Species of crustacean

Branchinecta lutulenta, the muddy fairy shrimp , is a critically imperiled species of freshwater fairy shrimp in the genus Branchinecta endemic to a small area of Washington. It became a lost species after its original discovery in 1959 by Lynch, with rediscovery efforts beginning in 1999 and finally succeeding in 2011. Formal description didn't occur when it was first collected but rather when it was rediscovered, and found them to be most closely related to B. lindahli and B. oterosanvicentei.

== Etymology & discovery ==
The species name lutulenta is derived from the Latin "lutulentus", meaning "muddy." This name was used in honor of its discoverer, the influential Branchiopod expert James E. Lynch who discovered and described 4 Branchinecta species from the Pacific Northwest, such as B. gigas, who likely gave it its scientific and common name from its habitat of small muddy pools in a flood plain. Lynch discovered it in two small pools between Beverly and Smyrna in 1959 on a trip from Western Washington to visit his sister in Spokane, with the specimens being posthumously donated to the USNM.

== Description ==
Males are distinguished from other species of Branchinecta through the second antenna apex, being rotated and having the medial surface facing anteriorly, and the medial fold in the apex, making it appear trilobed, with truly trilobed apexes on the second antenna being seen in certain South American species but not its relatives. The males resemble B. lindahli, B. sandiegonensis, and B. oterosanvicentei in having a similar second antennal proximal antennomere and a broad, laterally flattened distal antennomere, but can be distinguished by having a rotated and folded apex. The females are distinguished by having dorsolateral projections limited to the thoracic segments 3-7, rather than the 4-11 of B. lindahli and B. oterosanvicentei.

== Habitat and conservation ==
It is restricted to a minuscule range of less than 100 square kilometers (40 square miles) on the Columbia Plateau in Grant County near Jericho, Beverly, Smyrna, and Royal City, with the original collection site likely being converted into a quarry. It lives in wide but shallow muddy freshwater alkaline pools within low drainage floodplain sediment, with pH ranging from 8.58-8.89 and salinity (electrical conductivity) ranging from 2.2-3.2 mmhos/cm, and water tested nearby having a salinity of 0.10%. It co-occurs with B. mackini in some pools, which is significantly more common.

It is extremely rare, first being found in 1959 and with numerous expeditions in 1997, 1998, 1999, 2000, 2002, 2007, and 2008 not being able to find it, finally being rediscovered in 2011. It is currently listed as critically imperiled, being limited to a single small region subject to habitat destruction, with the type locality being destroyed.
