= Midvalley fairy shrimp =

Conservation status
- Imperiled (NatureServe)

Scientific classification
- Kingdom: Animalia
- Phylum: Arthropoda
- Clade: Pancrustacea
- Class: Branchiopoda
- Order: Anostraca
- Family: Branchinectidae
- Genus: Branchinecta
- Species: B. mesovallensis

Binomial name
- Branchinecta mesovallensis Belk & Fugate, 2000

Species of freshwater crustacean

The midvalley fairy shrimp, Branchinecta mesovallensis, is a small (7–20 millimeters or 0.28–0.79 inches) freshwater crustacean in the Branchinectidae family. The midvalley fairy shrimp was only recently formally described as a species in 2000 by Belk and Fugate. Midvalley fairy shrimp are endemic to shallow ephemeral pools (pools that seasonally fill and dry up) near the middle of California's Central Valley. These vernal pool ecosystems are home to other unique organisms adapted to the ephemeral nature of the water cycle in the pools in California's mediterranean climate.

It is one of eight known branchiopod species found only in Northern California. The species swims through the water on its back, using two stalked compound eyes to see where it is going. It propels itself along by beating its phyllopods. These are legs with leaflike or paddlelike structures. The moving phyllopods also serve as gills, extracting oxygen from the water stream they create. This places the shrimp in the Class Branchiopoda ("branchio" meaning gill, and "poda" meaning feet).

== Federal and state protection status ==
On August 31, 2001, the U.S. Fish and Wildlife Service was petitioned by the Center for Biological Diversity and VernalPools.Org to list the midvalley fairy shrimp as an endangered species pursuant to the Endangered Species Act, and to concurrently designate critical habitat for the species. On April 29, 2003, the U.S. Fish and Wildlife Service published a finding in Federal Register notice that the petition presented substantial information to indicate that listing might be warranted. After reviewing the available scientific and commercial information, the U.S. Fish and Wildlife Service have found that listing is not warranted at this time.

As of 2024, the midvalley fairy shrimp is considered eligible for listing as a rare, threatened or endangered species under the California Environmental Quality Act. This is attributed to ongoing habitat fragmentation and loss, which poses a significant threat to the survival of the midvalley fairy shrimp.

== Ecology and description ==
Fairy shrimp are in the order Anostraca ("an" meaning without, "ostraca" meaning hard plate or shell). They do not have a carapace, a hard shell covering their heads and backs. The midvalley fairy shrimp uses its phyllopods to filter food out of the water, including phytoplankton, detrital bacterial colonies, rotifers, protozoa and small larvae of various species, which it then passes up to its mouth via a food groove on its belly. In addition to providing for movement, oxygen and food, the phyllopods also contain cells responsible for salt exchange.

The species has been found in shallow vernal pools, vernal swales and various artificial ephemeral wetland habitats in Sacramento County, Solano County, Contra Costa County, San Joaquin County, Madera County, Merced County and Fresno County. Vernal pools are shallow depressions with impermeable soils that collect water during the wet season, dry completely during the dry season, and support a specific community of plants adapted to such conditions. Vernal swales are similar, but tend to convey surface runoff during wet seasons in somewhat defined vegetated channels that often connect vernal pools. Midvalley fairy shrimp have also been found in various roadside puddles, scrapes, and ditches, and in several railroad toe-drain pools. The species appears to do best in shallow, cool water pools that are low to moderate in dissolved salts. However, it can tolerate warm water. In one instance live adults were found swimming in 32 °C (90 °F) water. Members of the species have also been found in some relatively alkaline pools. A 1998 comparison of the characteristics of pools used by the eight branchiopod species endemic to Northern California found that midvalley fairy shrimp used the shallowest pools. The midvalley shrimp were found in pools averaging 10.1 centimetres (4.0 in) deep.

== Sexual characteristics and reproduction ==
Adult males of the species most closely resemble male Conservancy fairy shrimp, in that their antennae are relatively smooth and consist of two jointed segments of approximately equal length, the second of which bends inward about 90° at the tip. Viewed from the belly side of the animal, the tip has two humps, the larger of which is towards the front of the animal in the midvalley fairy shrimp and towards the rear in the Conservancy fairy shrimp. The antennal configuration has more significance than might at first appear. Males use these appendages to clasp females during mating. The females thrash about when clasped, and inappropriately shaped male antennae are less likely to successfully hold on. Females are easily distinguished from female Conservancy fairy shrimp because of their pear-shaped rather than spindle-shaped brood pouches, which do not extend as far down the body. Female midvalley fairy shrimp more closely resemble female vernal pool fairy shrimp, which also have pear-shaped brood pouches. However, female vernal pool fairy shrimp also possess a pair of conspicuous bumps on the sides of their third thoracic segments, which midvalley shrimp lack.

Midvalley fairy shrimp populations survive the seasonal drying of their ponds by laying eggs encased in nearly impervious shells. Embryos within these eggs enter a dormant state called diapause. Dormant eggs are referred to as cysts. Because not all cysts hatch with each refilling of a pool they can form a sort of "seed bank" in the soil that produces new populations of adult shrimp where none had been seen in years. In related species, cysts many decades old have been successfully hatched. Since the cysts can pass unharmed through the digestive systems of other animals, and since they are very small (0.27 millimetres or 0.011 inches), they can be transported to new locations by birds or mammals and thereby found new colonies.

As might be expected from a species found in relatively small, potentially quick drying pools, midvalley fairy shrimp can mature very quickly in warm pools, which are typically small. However, they can mature more slowly in cooler (typically larger) pools. They can mature within about 8 days of hatching, although 26 seems to be the average. Multiple hatchings have been observed in a single rainy season.

== Distribution ==
Midvalley fairy shrimp have been found in shallow vernal pools, vernal swales and various artificial ephemeral wetland habitats in the following California counties: Sacramento, Solano, Yolo, Contra Costa, San Joaquin, Madera, Merced and Fresno. Since the U.S. Fish and Wildlife Service published our 90-day finding on a petition to list the species in April, 2003, more new sites have been documented. The total number of occurrences documented in the California Natural Diversity Database is 63 as of February 2006.

The increase of known locations lends additional support to the idea that the range and distribution of midvalley fairy shrimp is greater than the distribution of known occurrences. The species has only been formally described since June 2000, and less formally described since 1999. The record of known occurrences therefore may poorly reflect the actual extent of the species distribution. The CNDDB does include occurrence sightings dating back to 1989, but these early sightings are all based on individual shrimp from the collection of Denton Belk, one of the authors of the formal description. Since male and female midvalley fairy shrimp closely resemble male Conservancy fairy shrimp and female vernal pool fairy shrimp, many occurrences could have been overlooked in many surveys conducted prior to about 1998.

== Threats ==
As stated in the U.S. Fish and Wildlife Service's 1994 listing of four other vernal pool shrimp species (59 FR 48136), California's remaining vernal pools have been under severe pressure from urban development, agricultural conversion and associated hydrological changes. Losses of vernal pool habitat were noted prior to 1997.

High human population growth estimates in the counties occupied by the shrimp, and potential threats from specific proposed development projects such as the new University of California, Merced campus are causes for concern.

The U.S. Fish and Wildlife Service believes that loss of habitat may constitute a threat to vernal pool species. It is less clear, however, to what extent previous listing actions and other regulatory mechanisms may reduce that threat in the case of the midvalley fairy shrimp.
