= Branchinecta gaini =

Scientific classification
- Domain: Eukaryota
- Kingdom: Animalia
- Phylum: Arthropoda
- Class: Branchiopoda
- Order: Anostraca
- Family: Branchinectidae
- Genus: Branchinecta
- Species: B. gaini

Binomial name
- Branchinecta gaini Daday, 1910

Species of fairy shrimp

Branchinecta gaini is a species of fairy shrimp from Antarctica and Patagonia. It is the largest freshwater invertebrate in Antarctica, at 16 mm (0.63 in) long. It lives on bacteria and other organisms, surviving the winter as resting eggs.

== Distribution ==
Branchinecta gaini is found from "half-way down the Antarctic Peninsula" northwards, including southernmost South America and subantarctic islands such as South Georgia and the South Orkney Islands. It is the only fairy shrimp on mainland Antarctica, where it is "rather widespread on the Antarctic Peninsula"; records of "Branchinecta granulosa" from Antarctica are all misidentifications of B. gaini. In the South Shetland Islands, B. gaini has been recorded from the lakes on the ice-free Byers Peninsula of Livingston Island (alongside Boeckella poppei and the benthic cladoceran Macrothrix ciliata), in Lake Wujka, and in Sombre Lake on Signy Island (alongside Boeckella poppei and the carnivorous Parabroteus sarsi).

The only known fossil records of the genus Branchinecta are of B. gaini; its eggs have been found in mid to late Holocene (4,200 BP) lake deposits on James Ross Island, on the east side of the Antarctic Peninsula. B. gaini no longer occurs on James Ross Island, presumably because the lakes are unfrozen for too short a period for B. gaini to complete its life cycle. The egg cases were found to be most abundant during the Holocene climatic optimum, indicating that cyanobacterial mats must have been present in the lake then. Eggs dating from 5,500 BP have also been found on Signy Island, where the species persists.

== Description ==
Branchinecta gaini can reach a total length of 16 millimetres (0.63 in), making it the largest freshwater invertebrate in Antarctica. It uses its trunk limbs to scrape food from the substrate.

== Ecology and life cycle ==
Branchinecta gaini feeds on epiphytes in bacterial mats, and on the mats themselves. The gut contents of B. gaini are dominated by green algae, hyphae and remains of other B. gaini individuals. They live for over six months, and produce resting eggs which can survive the winter, when the lakes are frozen. Although B. gaini often coexists with the copepod Boeckella poppei, they are rarely seen in close contact. They may be in competition for food, or B. gaini may feed on the nauplii of the copepod.

Branchinecta gaini can be quite abundant, dominating the crustacean biomass in freshwater bodies in the South Orkney and South Shetland islands.

The dispersal of B. gaini between lakes is probably passive, with the most likely dispersal vectors being birds; branchiopod eggs swallowed by seabirds, even if still being brooded by the mother, can survive passage through the bird's digestive system.

== Taxonomic history ==
Branchinecta gaini was first described by the Hungarian biologist Eugen von Daday de Deés (also called Jenö Daday or Jenö Daday de Dées) in 1910 based on material collected from Petermann Island by the Deuxième Expédition Antarctique Française aboard the Pourquoi Pas ?, captained by Jean-Baptiste Charcot; the specific epithet commemorates the French algologist Louis Gain, who was responsible for preserving the specimens from that expedition.
