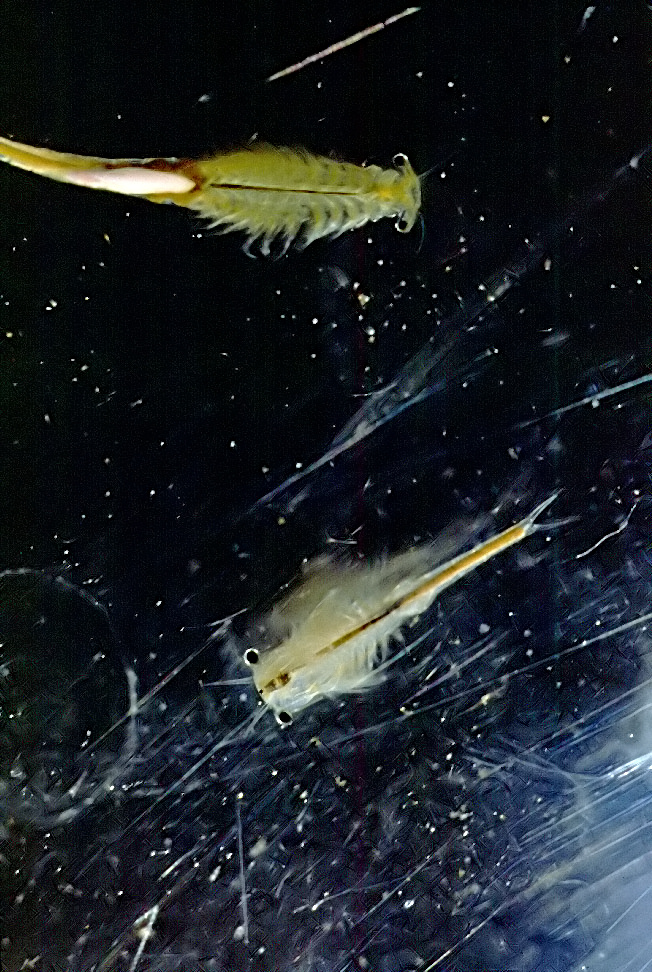

Conservation status
- Critically Endangered (IUCN 2.3)

Scientific classification
- Kingdom: Animalia
- Phylum: Arthropoda
- Class: Branchiopoda
- Order: Anostraca
- Family: Branchinectidae
- Genus: Branchinecta
- Species: B. mexicana

Binomial name
- Branchinecta mexicana Maeda-Martínez, Obregón-Barboza & Dumont, 1992

= Branchinecta mexicana =

Species of small freshwater animal

Branchinecta mexicana is a species of fairy shrimp in the family Branchinectidae. It is found in Central America.

The IUCN conservation status of Branchinecta mexicana is "CR", critically endangered. The species faces an extremely high risk of extinction in the immediate future. The IUCN status was reviewed in 1996.
