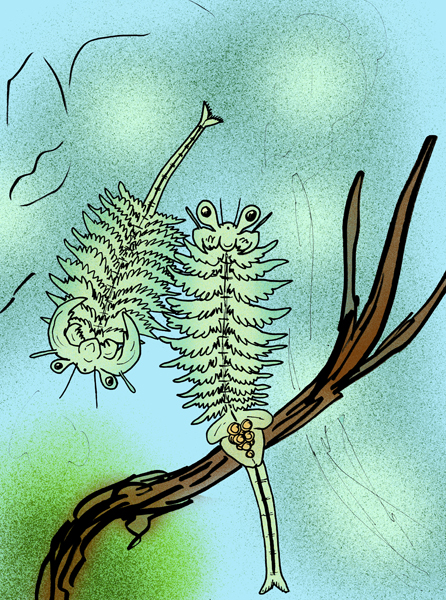
- Artist's restoration

Scientific classification
- Domain: Eukaryota
- Kingdom: Animalia
- Phylum: Arthropoda
- Class: Branchiopoda
- Order: Anostraca
- Family: Branchinectidae
- Genus: Archaebranchinecta
- Species: †A. barstowensis

Binomial name
- †Archaebranchinecta barstowensis (Belk & Schram, 2001)

Synonyms
- Branchinecta barstowensis Belk & Schram, 2001

= Archaebranchinecta barstowensis =

Archaebranchinecta barstowensis Temporal range: Middle Miocene

Species of small freshwater animal

Archaebranchinecta barstowensis is a species of fairy shrimp (Anostraca) that inhabited California during the Middle Miocene (13.4 million years ago). Its fecal material is abundant in the concretions from the Barstow Formation. A limited number of whole specimens have been found, and they represent the "best-preserved fossil anostracan known to date". The closest relative of A. barstowensis appears to be Archaebranchinecta pollicifera from the surroundings of Lake Titicaca, and the two have been separated from the genus Branchinecta as the new genus Archaebranchinecta.
