= Branchinecta belki =

Conservation status
- Critically Endangered (IUCN 2.3)

Scientific classification
- Kingdom: Animalia
- Phylum: Arthropoda
- Class: Branchiopoda
- Order: Anostraca
- Family: Branchinectidae
- Genus: Branchinecta
- Species: B. belki

Binomial name
- Branchinecta belki Maeda-Martínez, Obregón-Barboza & Dumont, 1992

Species of small freshwater animal

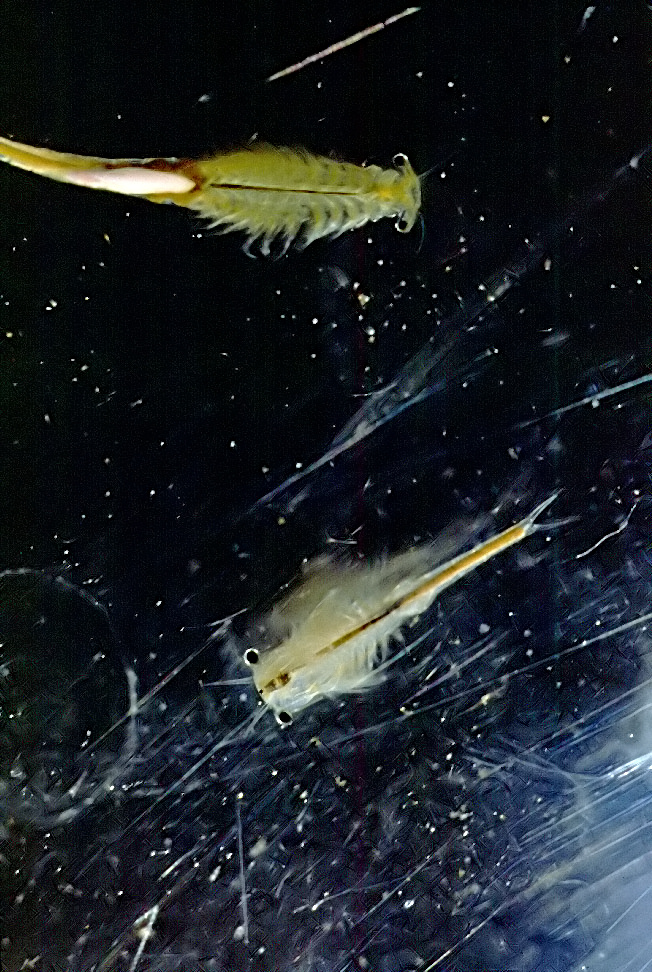
Adult fairy shrimp, Branchinecta packardi.

Branchinecta belki is a species of fairy shrimp in the family Branchinectidae. It is found in Central America.

The IUCN conservation status of Branchinecta belki is "CR", critically endangered. The species faces an extremely high risk of extinction in the immediate future. The IUCN status was reviewed in 2000.
