= Branchinecta longiantenna =

Conservation status
- Endangered (IUCN 2.3)

- Endangered (ESA)

Scientific classification
- Kingdom: Animalia
- Phylum: Arthropoda
- Class: Branchiopoda
- Order: Anostraca
- Family: Branchinectidae
- Genus: Branchinecta
- Species: B. longiantenna

Binomial name
- Branchinecta longiantenna Eng, Belk & Eriksen, 1990

Species of small freshwater animal

Branchinecta longiantenna is a rare species of crustacean in the family Branchinectidae and the order Anostraca, the fairy shrimp. Its common name is longhorn fairy shrimp. It is endemic to California in the United States, where there are only four known populations. It is a federally listed endangered species of the United States.

This fairy shrimp is between one and two centimeters in length and differs from other fairy shrimp in the shape of its antennae. The animal lives in vernal pools on grasslands as well as pools on sandstone substrates. The fairy shrimp takes at least 23 days to reach maturity, and about 43 days on average.

There are four populations in California, all well separated from each other. In San Luis Obispo County the fairy shrimp occurs in vernal pools on the Carrizo Plain. Several are protected, and some are unprotected on private property. In Merced County in the Central Valley, the species can be found within the San Luis National Wildlife Refuge, where it is protected. In Contra Costa County the species is present in several vernal pools and can be found in scattered water-filled rock indentations. This population is protected in a preserve. In Alameda County the fairy shrimp occurs in vernal pools in a preserve, where it is protected. In addition to these four populations, one individual fairy shrimp was located near Los Banos in 2003, but it probably does not indicate the presence of a new population.

This species is at risk for extinction because it has few small populations and the extirpation of any one could greatly reduce the total population.
