= Stratum =

Layer of sediment, rock or soil with internally consistent characteristics

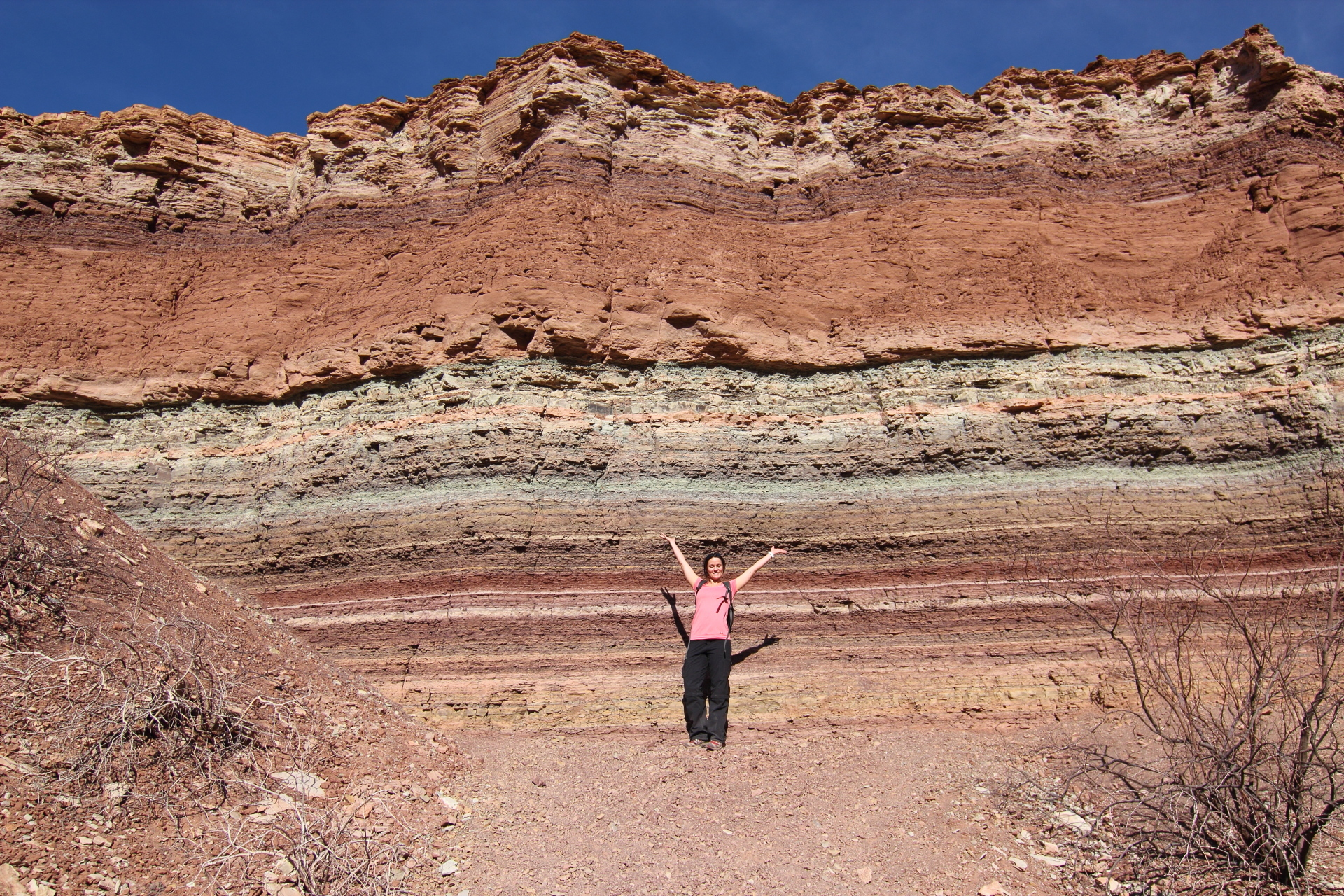
Strata in Salta (Argentina)

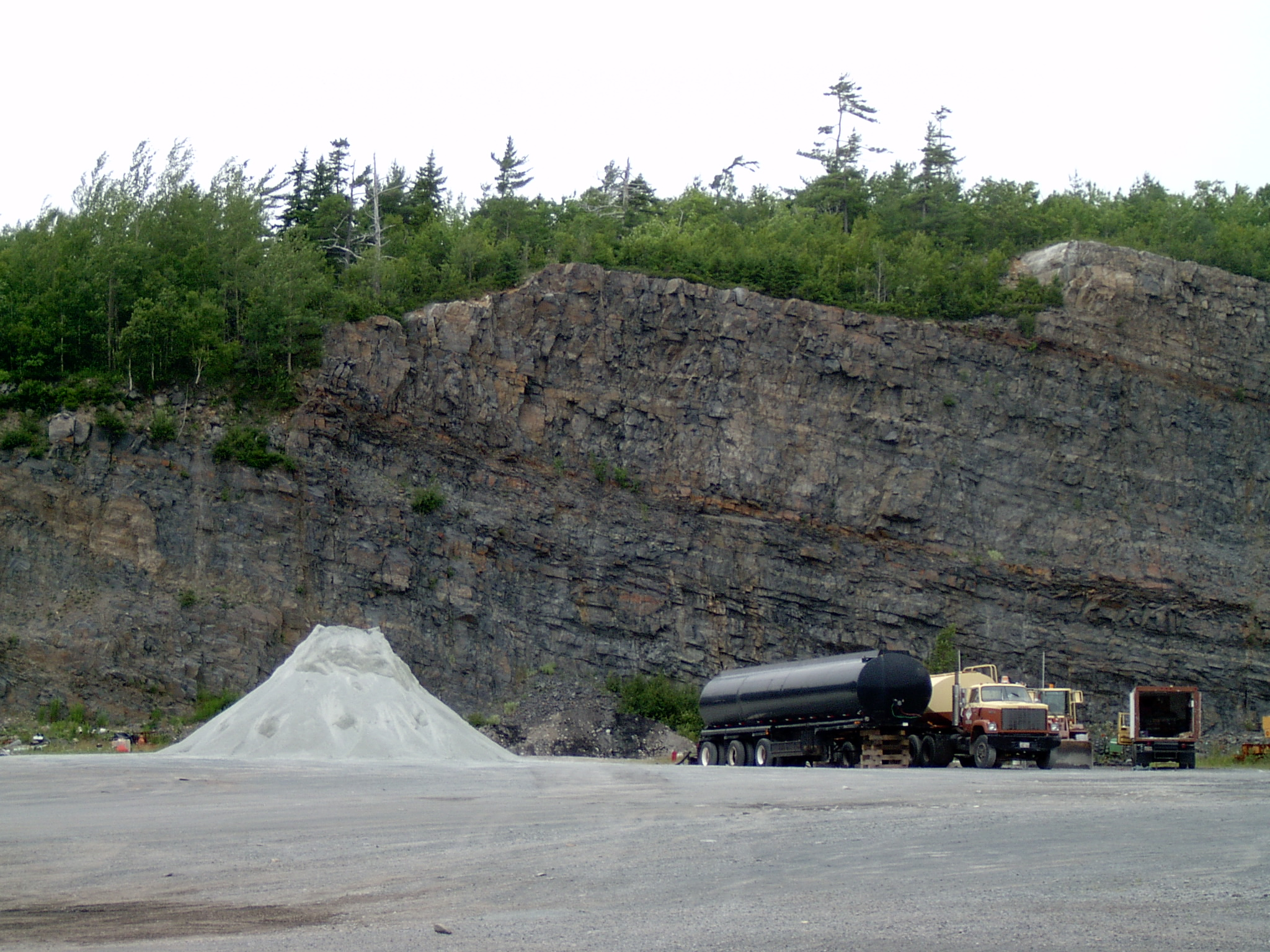
Goldenville strata in quarry in Bedford, Canada. These are Middle Cambrian marine sediments. This formation covers over half of Nova Scotia and is recorded as being 8,800 m (29,000 ft) thick in some areas.

In geology and related fields, a stratum (pl.: strata) is a layer of rock or sediment characterized by certain lithologic properties or attributes that distinguish it from adjacent layers from which it is separated by visible surfaces known as either bedding surfaces or bedding planes. Prior to the publication of the International Stratigraphic Guide, older publications have defined a stratum as being either equivalent to a single bed or composed of a number of beds; as a layer greater than 1 cm in thickness and constituting a part of a bed; or a general term that includes both bed and lamina. Related terms are substrate and substratum (pl.substrata), a stratum underlying another stratum.

== Characteristics ==
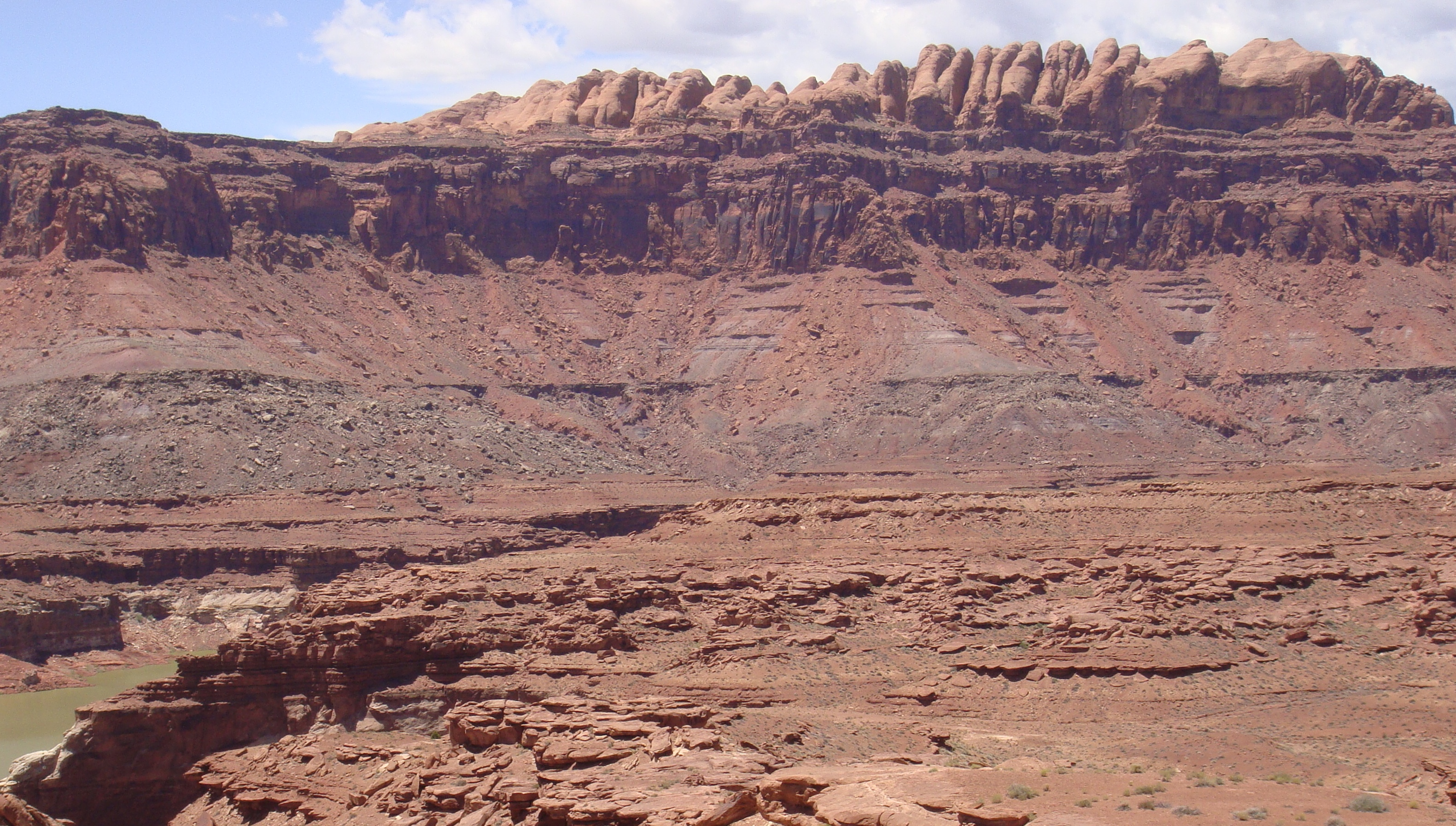
The Permian through Jurassic strata in the Colorado Plateau area of southeastern Utah demonstrate the principles of stratigraphy. These strata make up much of the famous prominent rock formations in widely spaced protected areas such as Capitol Reef National Park and Canyonlands National Park. From top to bottom: Rounded tan domes of the Navajo Sandstone, layered red Kayenta Formation, cliff-forming, vertically jointed, red Wingate Sandstone, slope-forming, purplish Chinle Formation, layered, lighter-red Moenkopi Formation, and white, layered Cutler Formation sandstone. Picture from Glen Canyon National Recreation Area, Utah.

Typically, a stratum is generally one of a number of parallel layers that lie one upon another to form enormous thicknesses of strata. The bedding surfaces (bedding planes) that separate strata represent episodic breaks in deposition associated either with periodic erosion, cessation of deposition, or some combination of the two. Stacked together with other strata, individual stratum can form composite stratigraphic units that can extend over hundreds of thousands of square kilometers of the Earth's surface. Individual strata can cover similarly large areas. Strata are typically seen as bands of different colored or differently structured material exposed in cliffs, road cuts, quarries, and river banks. Individual bands may vary in thickness from a few millimeters to several meters or more. A band may represent a specific mode of deposition: river silt, beach sand, coal swamp, sand dune, lava bed, and others.

== Types ==
In the study of rock and sediment strata, geologists have recognized a number of different types of strata, including bed, flow, band, and key bed. A bed is a single stratum that is lithologically distinguishable from other layers above and below it. In the classification hierarchy of sedimentary lithostratigraphic units, a bed is the smallest formal unit. However, only beds that are distinctive enough to be useful for stratigraphic correlation and geological mapping are customarily given formal names and considered formal lithostratigraphic units. The volcanic equivalent of a bed, a flow, is a discrete extrusive volcanic stratum or body distinguishable by texture, composition, or other objective criteria. As in case of a bed, a flow should only be designated and named as a formal lithostratigraphic unit when it is distinctive, widespread, and useful for stratigraphic correlation. A band is a thin stratum that is distinguishable by a distinctive lithology or color and is useful in correlating strata. Finally, a key bed, also called a marker bed, is a well-defined, easily identifiable stratum or body of strata that has sufficiently distinctive characteristics, such as lithology or fossil content, to be recognized and correlated during geologic field or subsurface mapping.

== Gallery ==
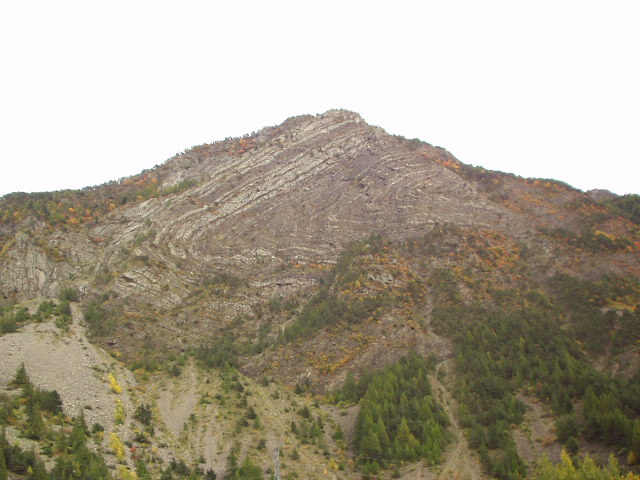
Strata on a mountain face in the French Alps

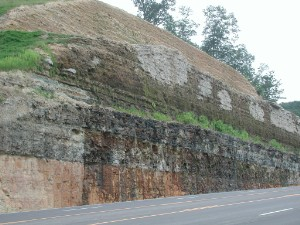
Interstate road cut through limestone and shale strata in East Tennessee

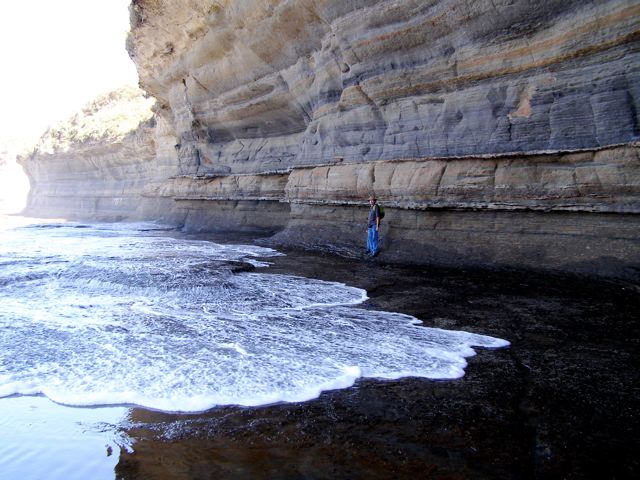
Rock strata at Depot Beach, New South Wales

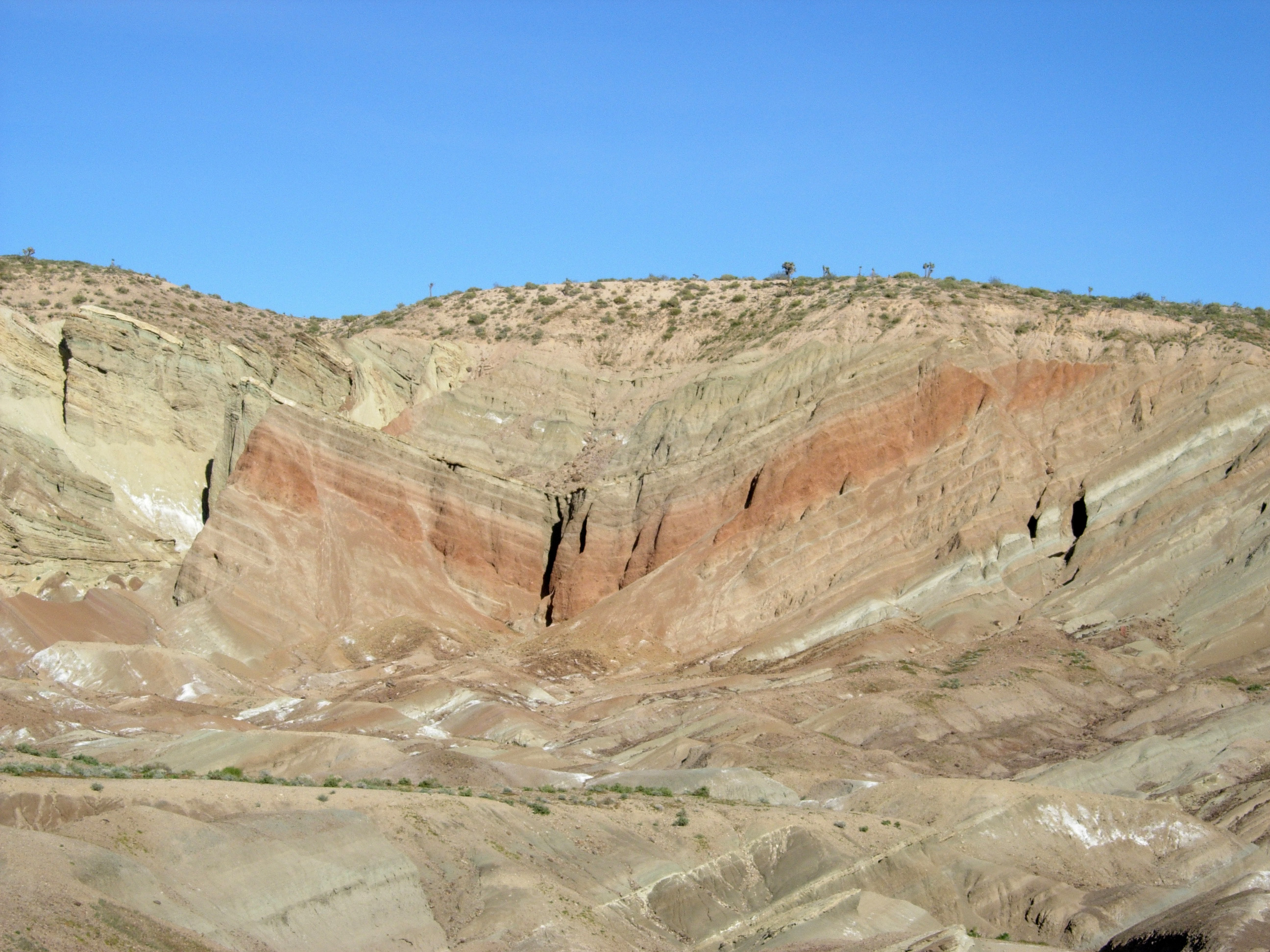
Rainbow Basin Syncline in the Barstow Formation near Barstow, California. Folded strata.

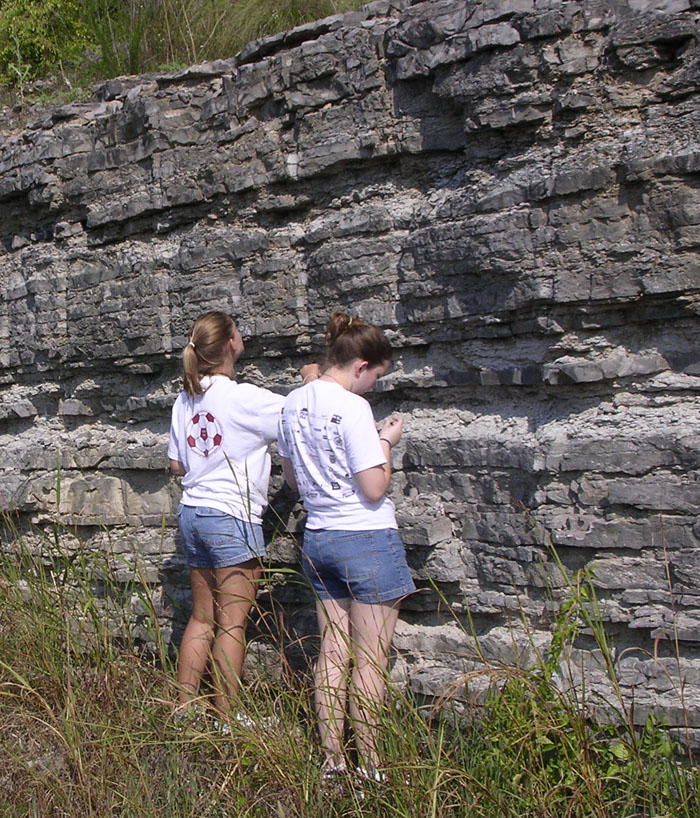
Outcrop of Upper Ordovician limestone and minor shale, central Tennessee

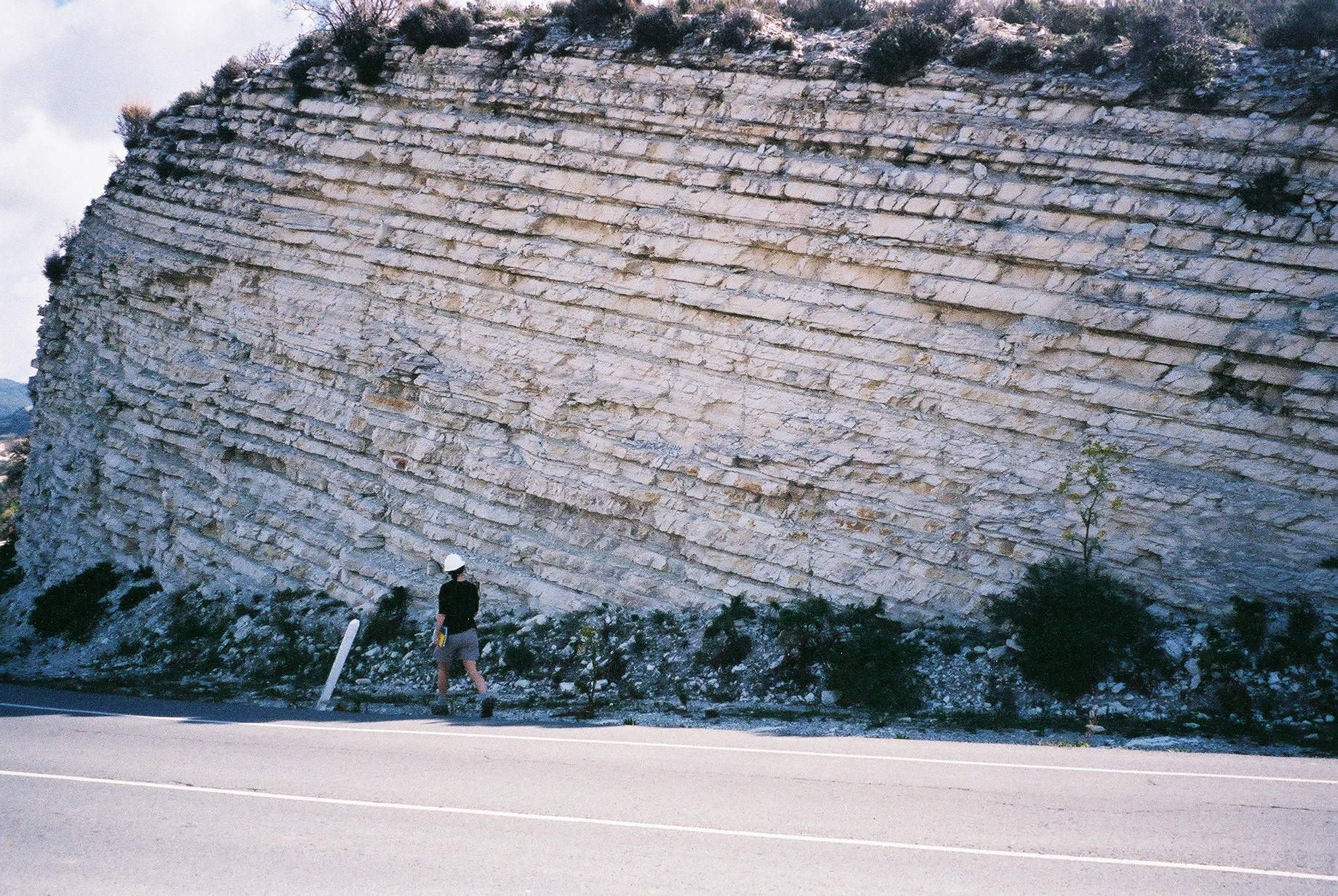
Chalk Layers in Cyprus showing classic layered structure

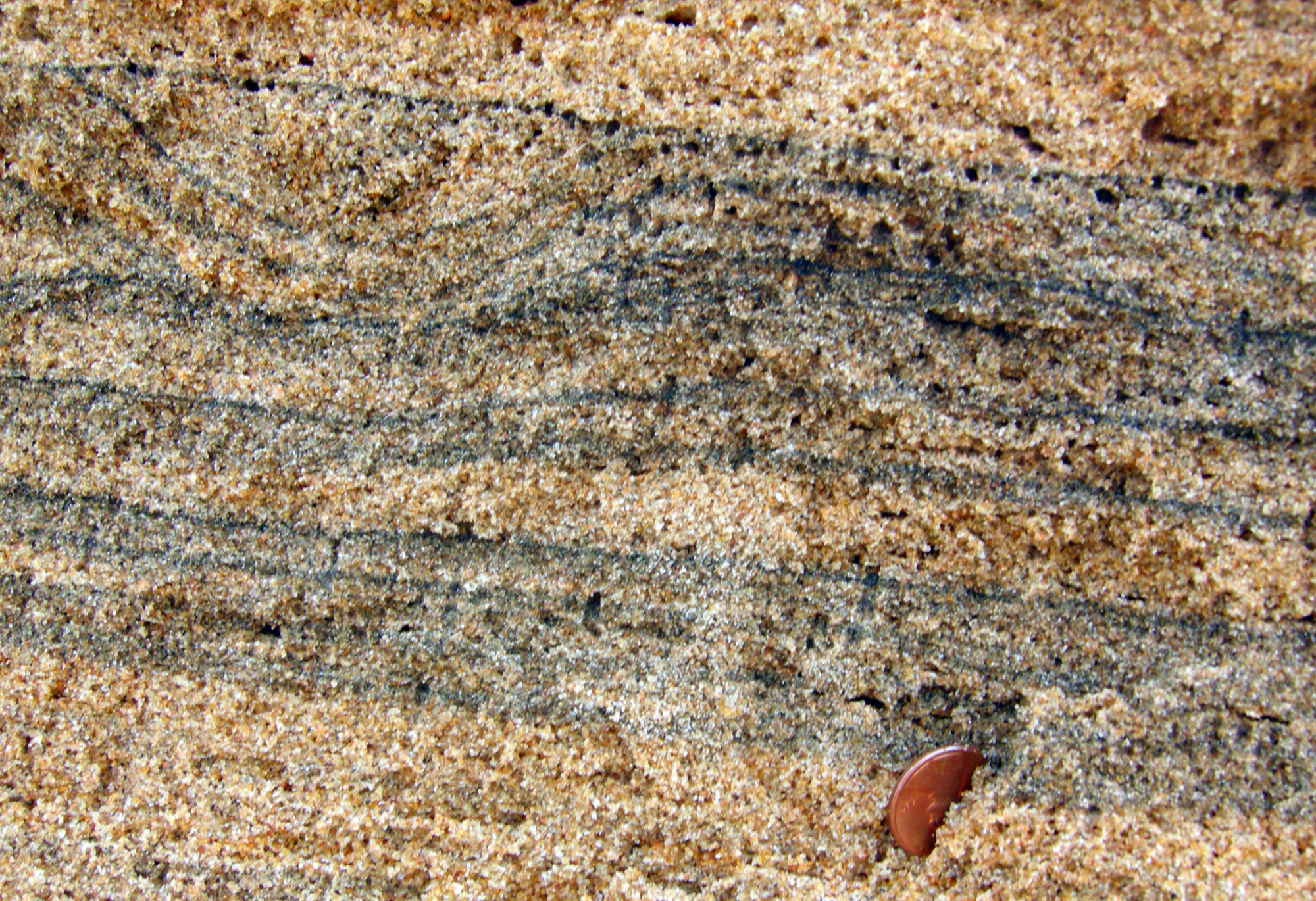
Heavy minerals (dark) as thin strata in a quartz beach sand (Chennai, India)

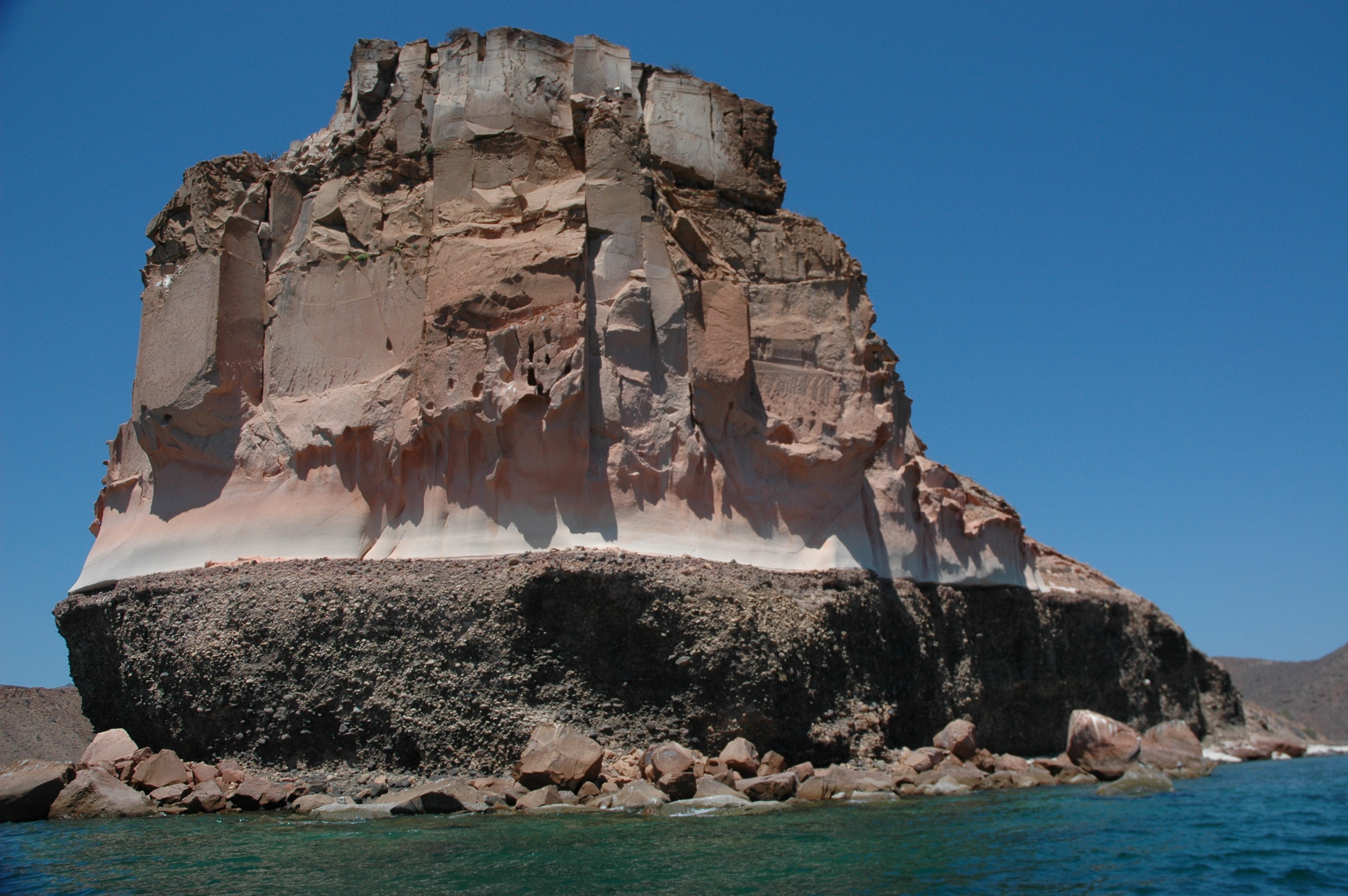
Stratified Island near La Paz, Baja California Sur, Mexico

== See also ==
- Archaeological horizon
- Bed (geology)
- Geological formation
- Geologic unit
- Lamination (geology)
- Law of superposition
