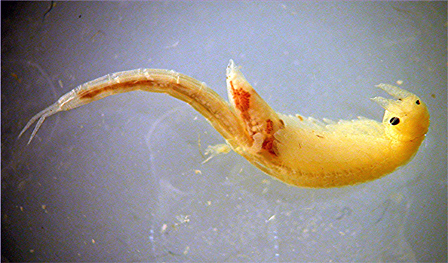

Conservation status
- Vulnerable (IUCN 2.3)

Scientific classification
- Kingdom: Animalia
- Phylum: Arthropoda
- Clade: Pancrustacea
- Class: Branchiopoda
- Order: Anostraca
- Family: Branchinectidae
- Genus: Branchinecta
- Species: B. lynchi

Binomial name
- Branchinecta lynchi Eng, Belk & Eriksen, 1990

= Branchinecta lynchi =

Vernal pool fairy shrimp

Species of small freshwater animal

The vernal pool fairy shrimp, Branchinecta lynchi, is a species of freshwater crustacean in the family Branchinectidae. It is endemic to the U.S. states of Oregon and California, living in vernal pools as well as non-vernal pool habitat. They range in size from 0.43 to 0.98 inches (11 to 25 mm) long. Vernal pool fairy shrimp are listed as a vulnerable species on the IUCN Red List, and have been listed as a Federally Threatened species since 1994.

== Description ==
Vernal pool fairy shrimp are usually translucent, however some have been observed to be white or orange.

They feature stalked compound eyes, no carapace, and eleven pairs of legs. Male fairy shrimp can be identified by large antennae called claspers, which distinguish them from their female counterparts. The fairy shrimp swim by moving their legs from front to back in a wave-like motion. They are known for their unique swimming orientation, as they swim "upside down." Vernal pool fairy shrimp require cooler water with low alkalinity and low total dissolved solids that can often be found in smaller pools about six inches deep.

The vernal pool fairy shrimp's natural predators include the vernal pool tadpole shrimp, or Lepidurus packardi, salamanders, and beetle larvae. Vernal pools are the ideal habitat for vernal pool fairy shrimp, as they typically cannot sustain larger aquatic predators that may pose a threat to the shrimp due to their drying tendencies.

== Habitat ==
As suggested by their name, vernal pool fairy shrimp live in vernal pools which are seasonal wetlands. These pools form when shallow basins are filled with seasonal precipitation, creating a short term habitat for fairy shrimp and other species that call vernal pools their home. Eventually, the vernal pools dry up and the habitat disappears until the next precipitation season.

Vernal pool fairy shrimp have been found in southern Oregon, and parts of California. They can survive if the pool's temperature is between 43 °F (6 °C) and 68 °F (20 °C). In Oregon, they have been discovered in the Agate Desert, around Agate Lake, and on the Upper and Lower Table Rocks. In California, fairy shrimp have been found in 33 locations in the Central Valley from Shasta County to Tulare County, and in the Coast Range from Solano County to San Benito County. They have also been found near Soda Lake, Santa Barbara County, the Santa Rosa Plateau, San Diego County and Riverside County.

Branchinecta lynchi can live in groups within the vernal pools of densities up to 200 shrimp per liter of water.

== Diet ==
Vernal pool fairy shrimp eat algae, bacteria, protozoa, rotifers, and detritus. The fairy shrimp uses its legs to scrape food from hard surfaces. To help them digest their meals, they create a thick, glue-like substance to mix with their food.

== Life cycle and reproduction ==
Vernal pool fairy shrimp typically hatch in early January and live until early March. They often take eight days at a temperature of 5 degrees Celsius. Oftentimes, the maturation rate of the eggs and younger vernal pool fairy shrimp depends on the overall temperature of the vernal pool—significant changes in temperature lead to issues within their development. Sometimes, the fairy shrimp can be spotted in vernal pools as early as November, when these pools form.

The fairy shrimp reach maturity after 41 days after which they begin reproduction.

The female fairy shrimp lay drought-resistant eggs shortly before they die. The eggs sink to the bottom of the vernal pools, embedding into the soil when they dry. The fairy shrimp eggs, also called cysts, are also hardy enough to survive being consumed by or stuck to other creatures and deposited in another location. When the vernal pool refills the next winter, the eggs hatch, starting the process over.

== Recovery plan for vernal pool fairy shrimp ==
In December 2005, the United States Fish & Wildlife Service announced the implementation of the Recovery Plan for Vernal Pool Ecosystems of California and Southern Oregon. The organization outlines that the objectives of this recovery plan are to both ameliorate the threats that caused the species vulnerability as well as conserve the current vernal pool ecosystem. Vernal ponds are rapidly declining in numbers due to the loss of woodland, emerging degradation and pollution, as well as the clearing of vegetation along these and other wetlands.
