= Branchinecta brushi =

Scientific classification
- Kingdom: Animalia
- Phylum: Arthropoda
- Clade: Pancrustacea
- Class: Branchiopoda
- Order: Anostraca
- Family: Branchinectidae
- Genus: Branchinecta
- Species: B. brushi

Binomial name
- Branchinecta brushi Hegna & Lazo-Wasem, 2010

Species of small freshwater animal

Branchinecta brushi is a species of fairy shrimp found at an altitude of 5,930 m (19,460 ft) in the Chilean Andes.

== Distribution and discovery ==
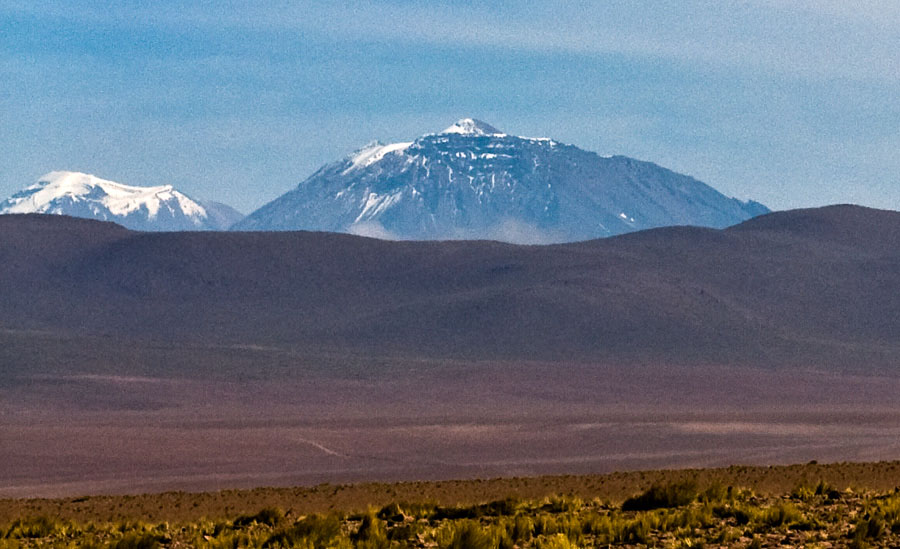
Branchinecta brushi lives near the summit of the stratovolcano Cerro Paniri.

The type specimens of B. brushi were collected on December 13, 1988 by Charles F. Brush during an attempt to break the world record for the world's highest SCUBA dive. This attempt took place in a small pool, 12 by 6 metres (39 ft × 20 ft) across, at an altitude of 5,930 metres (19,460 ft) near the summit of the stratovolcano Cerro Paniri (22.08°S 68.25°W) in the Antofagasta Region of Chile.

B. brushi was collected, along with some other species, from below 5 centimetres (2.0 in) of ice. The specimens were stored in 70% ethanol at the Peabody Museum of Natural History and the United States National Museum for nearly 20 years before being re-examined; the species was eventually described in 2010, and given the specific epithet brushi to commemorate Brush.

== Description ==
Males are 10–16 millimetres (0.39–0.63 in) long, while females are only 9–13 millimetres (0.35–0.51 in). In common with other fairy shrimp, the males bear complex structures on their second antennae, which are used in mating. B. brushi closely resembles Branchinecta valchetana, from which it differs in the form of the antennae and the gonopods.

== Ecology ==
Branchinecta brushi shares the record for the crustacean living at the highest altitude with the copepod Boeckella palustris, also found in the same pool. The only higher record, which claimed that Branchinecta paludosa occurred at 97,000 feet (30,000 m) is "almost certainly a typographical error". Crustaceans are rarely associated with life at high altitudes, but fairy shrimp such as B. brushi produce dormant cysts which are capable of surviving prolonged desiccation, and aid in dispersal. The closed nature of the water body probably reduces the risk of predation, allowing B. brushi to complete its life cycle.
