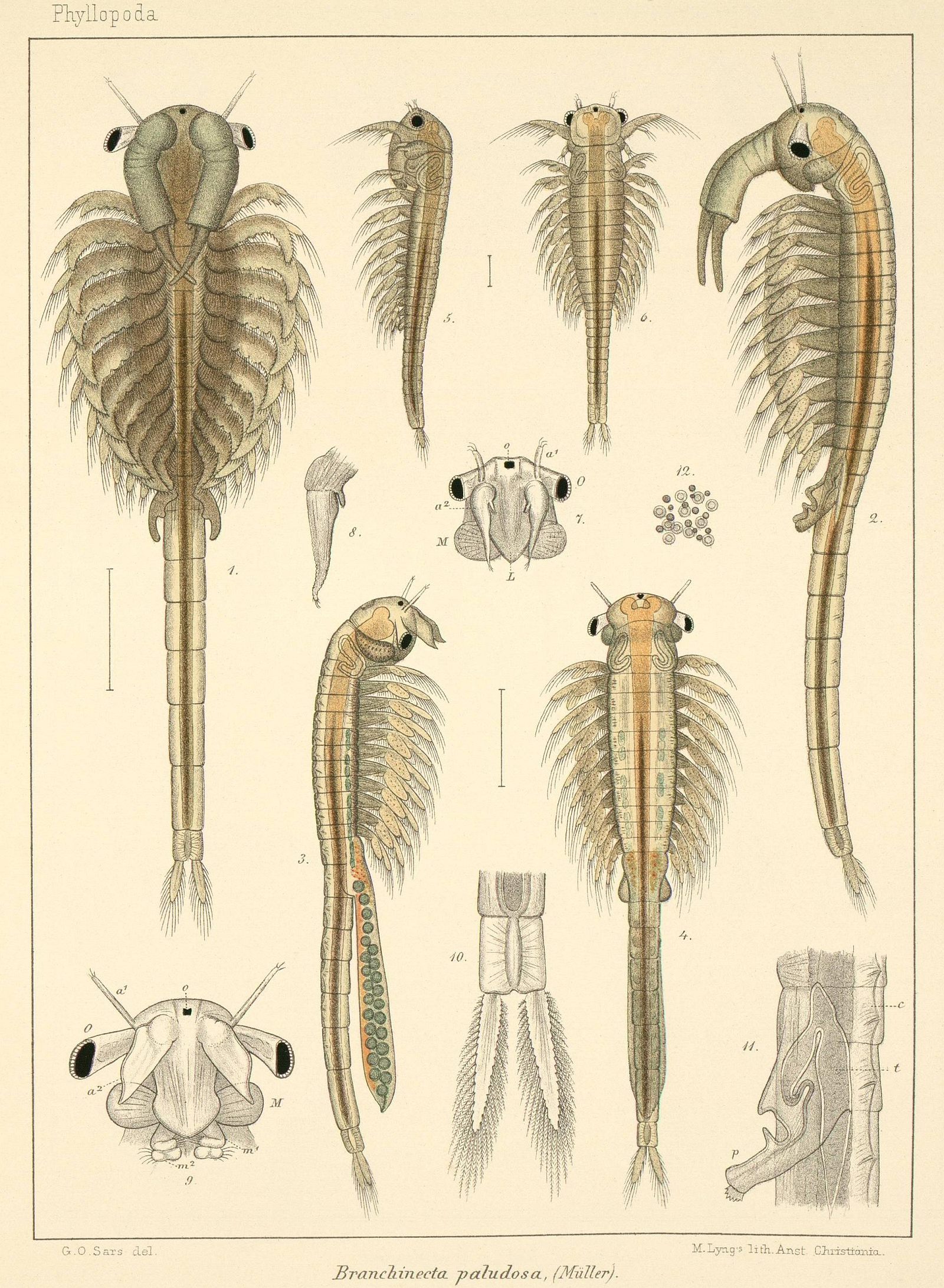
- Illustration from Fauna Norvegiae by Georg Ossian Sars (1896)

Scientific classification
- Kingdom: Animalia
- Phylum: Arthropoda
- Class: Branchiopoda
- Order: Anostraca
- Family: Branchinectidae
- Genus: Branchinecta
- Species: B. paludosa

Binomial name
- Branchinecta paludosa (O. F. Müller, 1788)

= Branchinecta paludosa =

Species of small freshwater animal

Branchinecta paludosa is a species of freshwater fairy shrimp with a Holarctic distribution.

== Distribution ==
B. paludosa is widely distributed in the Arctic tundra of Eurasia, chiefly above latitudes of 60° north. It reaches its northern limit, 77° north at Ivanov Bay in the Novaya Zemlya archipelago. Further populations exist as far south as the Tatra Mountains on the Polish–Slovak border at about 49° north. There are scattered records from North America, mostly near the Arctic Ocean.

== Life cycle ==
After hatching, young B. paludosa spend 20–30 days as larvae, before reaching sexual maturity between the end of July and middle of August. They are then reproductive for 35–45 days.
