= Parartemia contracta =

Conservation status
- Vulnerable (IUCN 2.3)

Scientific classification
- Kingdom: Animalia
- Phylum: Arthropoda
- Clade: Pancrustacea
- Class: Branchiopoda
- Order: Anostraca
- Family: Parartemiidae
- Genus: Parartemia
- Species: P. contracta

Binomial name
- Parartemia contracta Linder, 1941

Species of small freshwater animal

Parartemia contracta is a species of fairy shrimp in the family Parartemiidae and is commonly found in Australia.

In IUCN terms, the conservation status of Parartemia contracta is "VU" (vulnerable). Meaning that the species faces a high risk of endangerment in the medium term.
