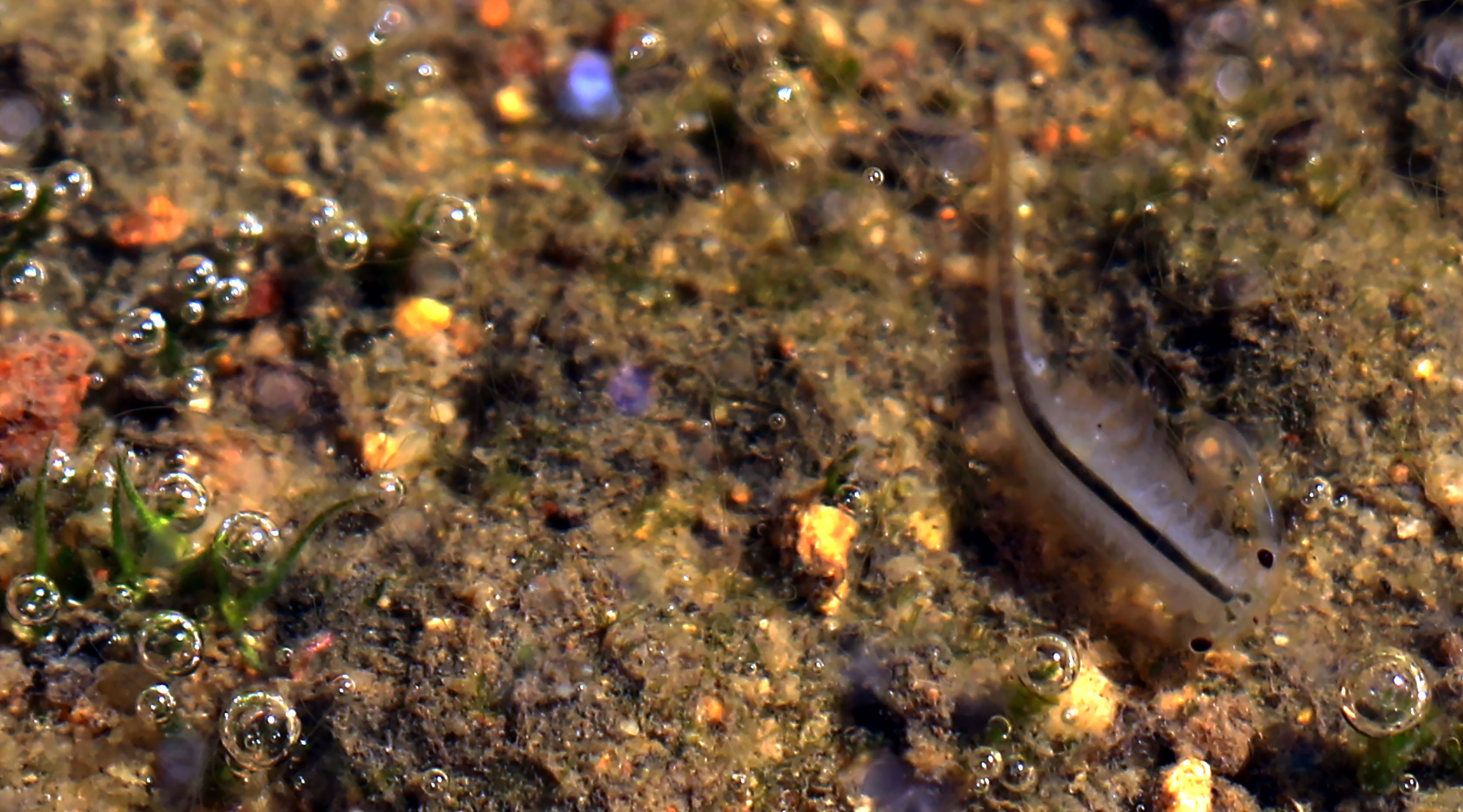
- Tentatively identified as B. sandiegonensis

Conservation status
- Endangered (IUCN 2.3)

Scientific classification
- Kingdom: Animalia
- Phylum: Arthropoda
- Clade: Pancrustacea
- Class: Branchiopoda
- Order: Anostraca
- Family: Branchinectidae
- Genus: Branchinecta
- Species: B. sandiegonensis

Binomial name
- Branchinecta sandiegonensis Fugate, 1993

= Branchinecta sandiegonensis =

Species of crustacean

Branchinecta sandiegonensis is a rare species of crustacean in the family Branchinectidae and the order Anostraca, the fairy shrimp. Commonly known as the San Diego fairy shrimp, it is named after the vernal pools found in San Diego County, California, where this species was originally discovered. It is also a federally listed endangered species of the United States.

== Description ==
B. sandiegonensis ranges 8–16 millimeters in length. It is often mistaken for other branchinectids. For males it can be distinguished by the length of the second antennae and for females by the appearance of the brood pouch.

== Distribution ==
B. sandiegonensis occurs along the coast of Southern California and northwestern Baja California, with its distribution centered in San Diego County, California.

== Ecology and behaviour ==
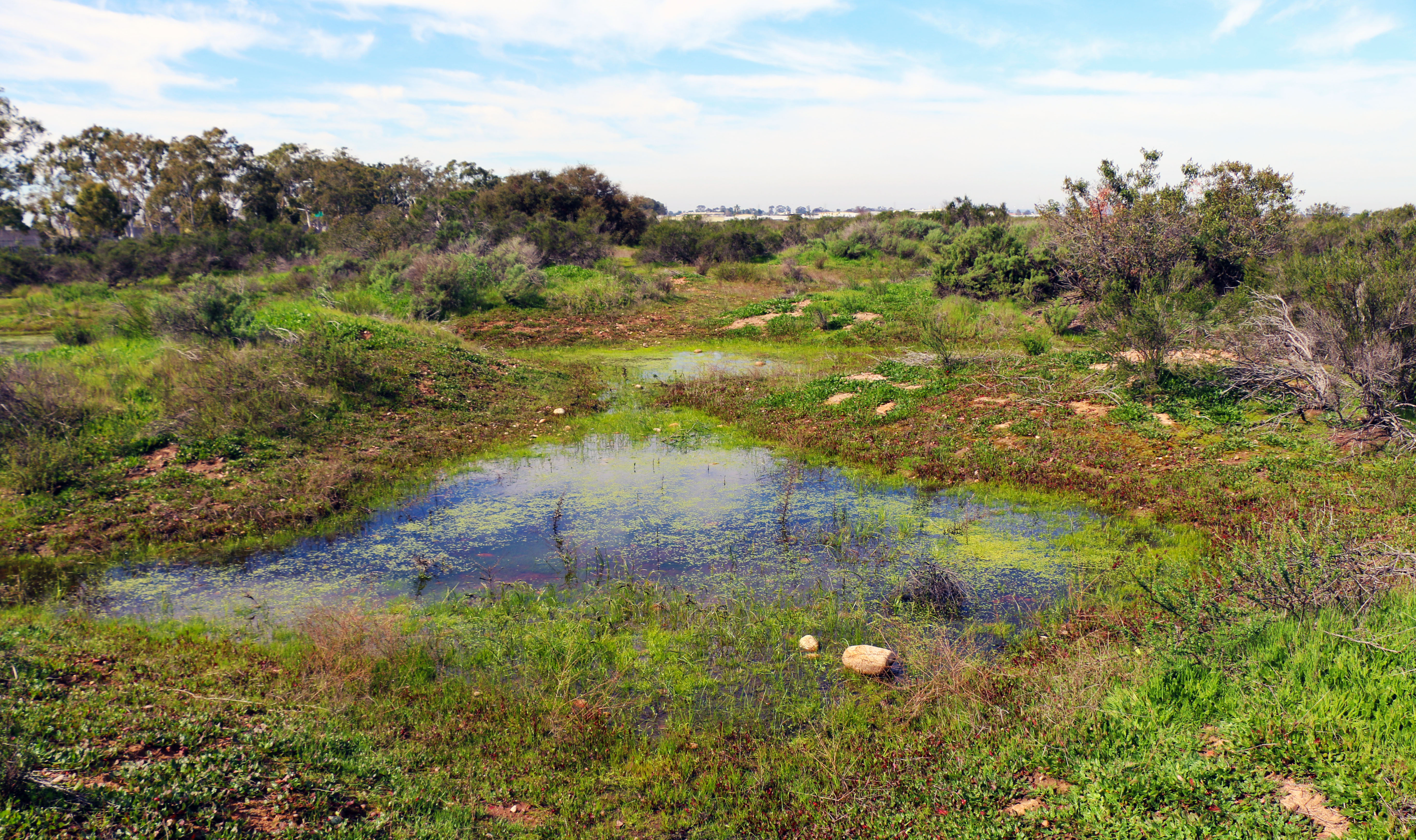
A vernal pool complex between mima mounds in San Diego County.

It exclusively lives in a vernal pool habitat. It has been identified at 137 vernal pool complexes, many of which have since been extirpated. Others, however, have been restored and preserved, and the shrimp has been reintroduced into appropriate pool habitat. Each pool "complex" consists of several vernal pools supported by a collective watershed, a critical component of the vernal pool system. Vernal pool complexes vary in size, from larger interspersed pools to smaller groups of pools, each pool spaced out from another by several meter lengths.

B. sandiegonensis appear during the rainy season from January to March, where vernal pools become filled with water and egg hatching begins. The cycle of hatching occurs across 7 to 14 days, where fairy shrimp hatch and mature to become full grown adults.

== Conservation ==
In the late 1900s, soil landscapes that supported vernal pools were significantly reduced due to human causes, resulting in fewer vernal pool habitats. B. sandiegonensis was officially listed by the U.S. Fish and Wildlife Service as an endangered species in 1997. Cited reasons include habitat destruction due to urban development and changes to vernal pool hydrology.

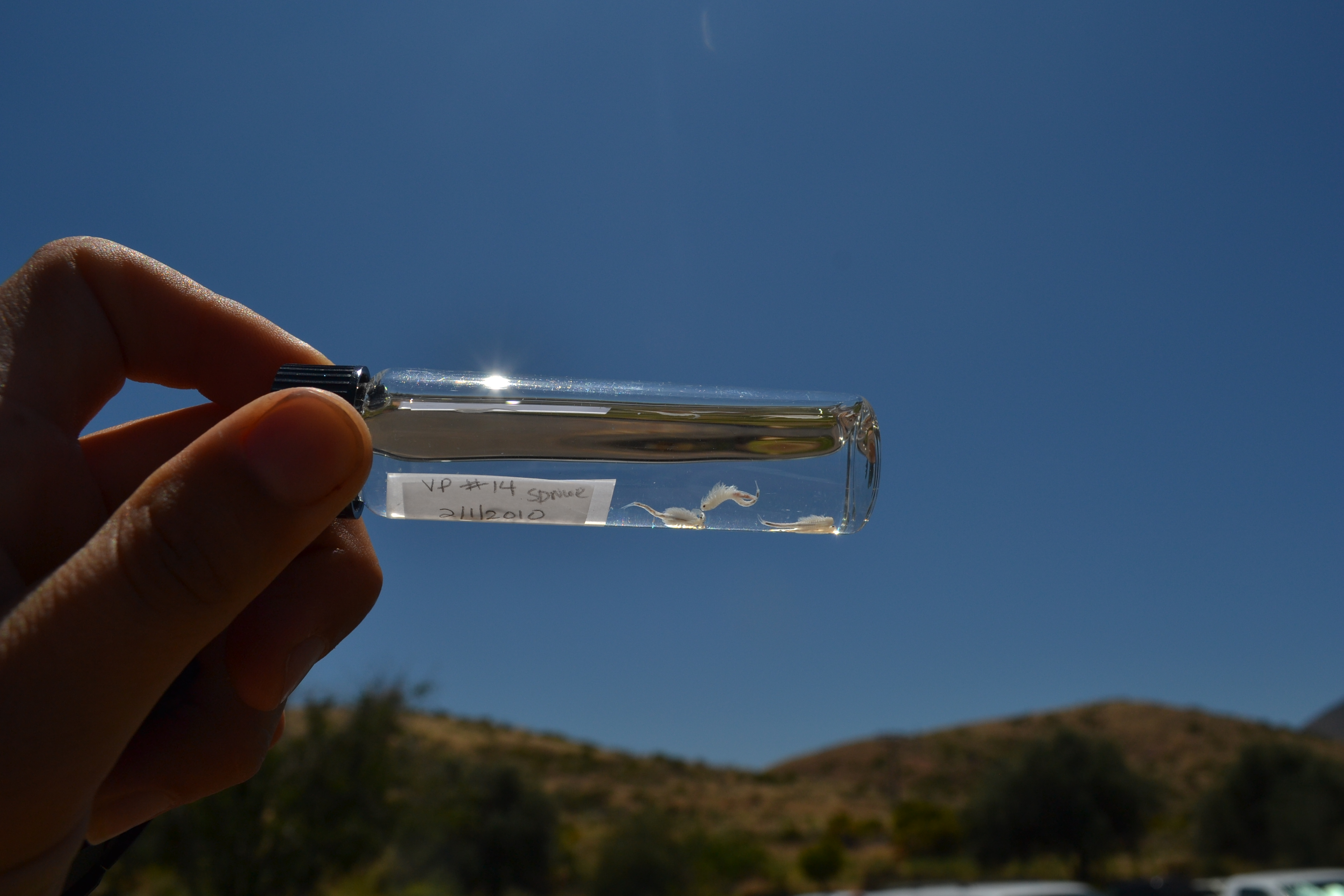
A sample of B. sandiegonensis taken for research (2010-02-01).

B. sandiegonensis has also been the subject of several studies on population genetics in an effort to better understand the fairy shrimp itself and the effects of habitat loss. A study on 50 vernal pools from 23 vernal pool complexes found that genetic differentation among B. sandiegonensis varies significantly, concluding that each complex needs to be viewed as a distinct management unit in order to strengthen conservation efforts.

Recent advances in research have also improved identification of B. sandiegonensis from other hybrids or species whose range overlap with it. Using eDNA testing, UCLA researchers have established a method to identify B. sandiegonensis from water samples without needing to directly sample individual fairy shrimp. The method was shown to be effective in distinguishing B. sandiegonensis from a similar generalist species Branchinecta lindahli, however more studies are needed to confirm whether it is effective for distinguishing hybrids. Improving identification of B. sandiegonensis will help tracking efforts across vernal pool complexes.
