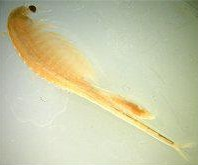

Conservation status
- Endangered (IUCN 2.3)

- Endangered (ESA)

Scientific classification
- Kingdom: Animalia
- Phylum: Arthropoda
- Class: Branchiopoda
- Order: Anostraca
- Family: Branchinectidae
- Genus: Branchinecta
- Species: B. conservatio

Binomial name
- Branchinecta conservatio Eng, Belk & Eriksen, 1990

= Conservancy fairy shrimp =

Species of small freshwater animal

The conservancy fairy shrimp (Branchinecta conservatio) is an endangered small crustacean in the family Branchinectidae. It ranges in size from about 1.25 centimetres (0.49 in) to 2.5 centimetres (0.98 in) long. This species is endemic to California in the United States.

Fairy shrimp are aquatic species in the order Anostraca. They have delicate elongate bodies, large stalked compound eyes, no carapaces, and eleven pairs of swimming legs. They glide gracefully upside down, swimming by beating their legs in a complex, wavelike movement that passes from front to back. Fairy shrimp feed on algae, bacteria, protozoa, rotifers and detritus.

== Ecology ==
Conservancy fairy shrimp inhabit rather large, moderately turbid cool-water vernal pools which fill with water in the rainy season, then slowly dry up from their outer, more shallow edges to their deeper areas in the center. However, the shrimp are gone long before the pool finally dries up. The fairy shrimp have been spotted and collected in vernal pools from early November to early April.

Female fairy shrimp carry their eggs in a ventral brood sac. The eggs are either dropped to the pool bottom or remain in the brood sac until the mother dies and sinks. When the pool dries out, so do the eggs. They remain in the dry pool bed until rains and other environmental stimuli hatch them.

Resting fairy shrimp eggs are known as cysts. They are capable of withstanding heat, cold and prolonged desiccation. When the pools refill, some, but not all, of the cysts may hatch. The cyst bank in the soil may contain cysts from several years of breeding.

Hatching can begin within the same week that a pool starts to fill. Average time to maturity is forty-nine days. In warmer pools, it can be as few as nineteen.

== Distribution ==
The historical distribution of the conservancy fairy shrimp is not known. However, the distribution of vernal pool habitats in the areas where the species is now known to occur were once more continuous and larger in area than they are today. It is likely the conservancy fairy shrimp once occupied suitable vernal pool habitats throughout a large portion of the Central Valley and southern coastal regions of California. It may still exist in unsurveyed pools within this region.

The species is currently known from several disjunct populations: Montgomery Field Vernal Pools in San Diego County the Vina Plains in Tehama County, south of Chico in Butte County, the Jepson Prairie Preserve and surrounding area in Solano County, the Sacramento National Wildlife Refuge Complex in Glenn County, Mapes Ranch west of Modesto, San Luis National Wildlife Refuge and the Haystack Mountain/Yosemite Lake area in Merced County, and two locations on the Los Padres National Forest in Ventura County.

Known to be found in Minnesota. (Metropolitan Mosquito Control District, special study 2014)

== Threats ==
The ephemeral wetlands that support this network of populations are remnants of what was formerly a pristine vernal pool ecosystem, which has been converted to primarily agricultural and urban uses. This highly disturbed remnant habitat is imperiled by a variety of human activities, primarily urban development, water supply and flood control projects and conversion of land for agricultural use.

Holland (1978) estimated that between 60 and 85 percent of the habitat that once supported vernal pools had been destroyed by 1973. Since then a substantial amount of remaining habitat has been converted for human uses. The rate of loss of vernal pool habitat in the state has been estimated at two to three percent per year (Holland and Jain 1988).

The conservancy fairy shrimp has been classified as an endangered species under the provisions of the Endangered Species Act of 1973 (Federal Register 59:48136; September 19, 1994).

== Additional information and references ==
- California Dept. of Fish & Game, California Vernal Pool Assessment, Preliminary Report
- Eriksen, C.H., and D. Belk. 1999. Fairy shrimps of California's puddles, pools, and playas, Mad River Press, Eureka, CA.
- Holland, R.F. 1978. The geographic and edaphic distribution of vernal pools in the Great Central Valley, California. California Native Plant Society, Special Publication 4:1-12.
- Holland, R. F., and S. Jain. 1988. Vernal pools. Pages 515-533 In: Michael G. Barbour and J. Major, eds. Terrestrial vegetation of California, new expanded edition. California Native Plant Society, Special Publication Number 9, Sacramento, CA.
- U.S. Fish & Wildlife Service. 1994. Endangered and Threatened Wildlife and Plants; Determination of Endangered Status for the Conservancy Fairy Shrimp, Longhorn Fairy Shrimp, and the Vernal Pool Tadpole Shrimp; and Threatened Status for the Vernal Pool Fairy Shrimp. Portland, Oregon.
- U.S. Fish and Wildlife Service. 2003. Endangered and Threatened Wildlife and Plants; Final Designation of Critical Habitat for Four Vernal Pool Crustaceans and Eleven Vernal Pool Plants in California and Southern Oregon Vernal pool crustaceans and plants in California and Oregon. Portland, Oregon.
- U.S. Fish and Wildlife Service. 2005. Endangered and Threatened Wildlife and Plants; Final Designation of Critical Habitat for Four Vernal Pool Crustaceans and Eleven Vernal Pool Plants in California and Southern Oregon; Evaluation of Economic Exclusions From August 2003 Final Designation; Final Rule. Portland, Oregon.
- U.S. Fish and Wildlife Service. 2006. Endangered and Threatened Wildlife and Plants: Designation of Critical Habitat for Four Vernal Pool Crustaceans and Eleven Vernal Pool Plants; Final Rule. Portland, Oregon.
- U.S. Fish and Wildlife Service. 2005. Recovery Plan for Vernal Pool Ecosystems of California and Southern Oregon. Portland, Oregon.
