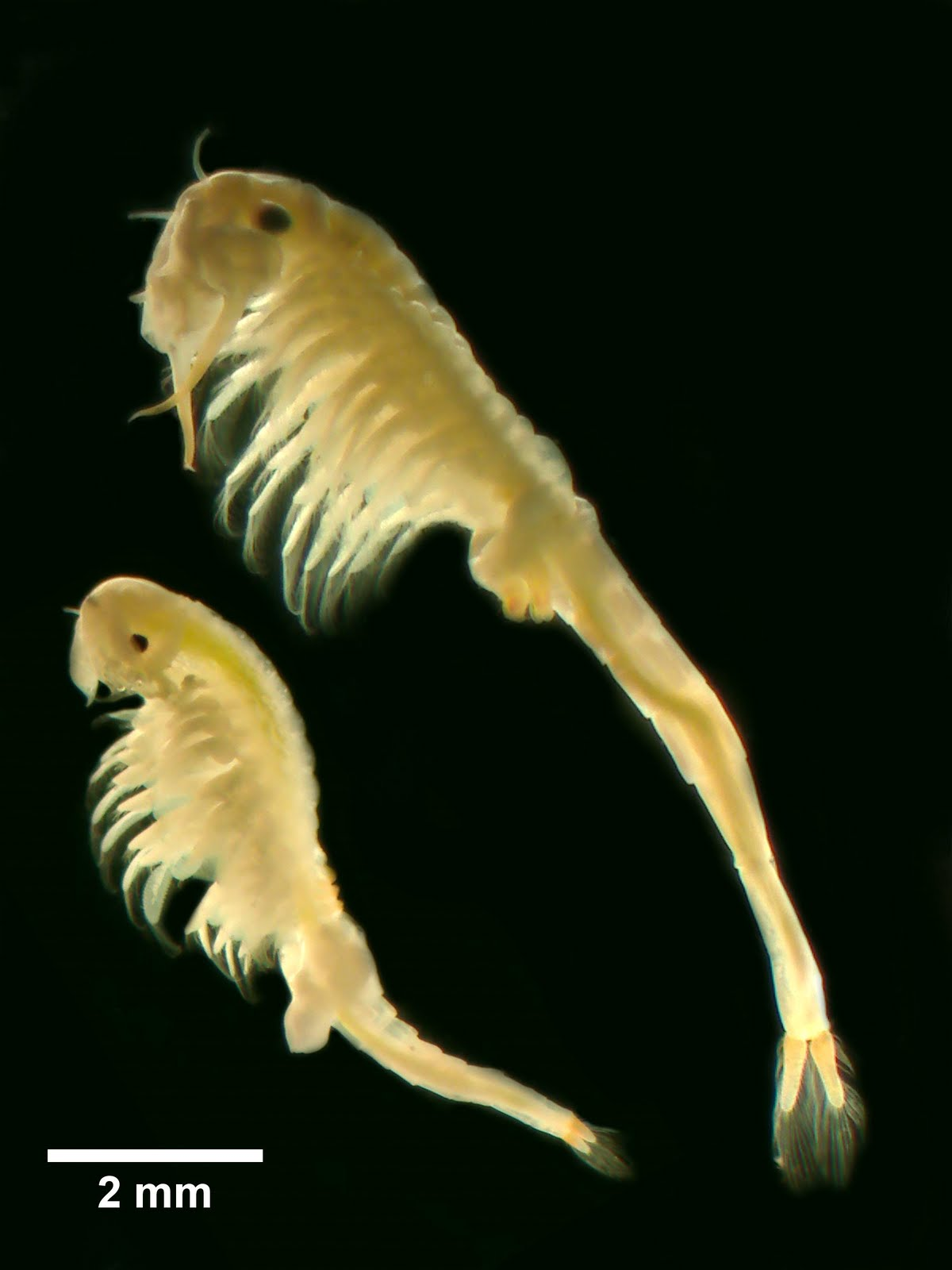
- P. zietziana

Scientific classification
- Kingdom: Animalia
- Phylum: Arthropoda
- Class: Branchiopoda
- Subclass: Sarsostraca
- Order: Anostraca
- Suborder: Artemiina
- Family: Parartemiidae
- Genus: Parartemia; O. A. Sayce, 1903

Species
- See text

= Parartemia =

Genus of small freshwater animals

Parartemia is a genus of brine shrimp endemic to Australia. One species, P. contracta is listed as vulnerable on the IUCN Red List. Parartemia contains the following species:

- Parartemia acidiphila Timms & Hudson, 2009
- Parartemia auriciforma Timms & Hudson, 2009
- Parartemia bicorna Timms, 2010
- Parartemia boomeranga Timms, 2010
- Parartemia contracta Linder, 1941
- Parartemia cylindrifera Linder, 1941
- Parartemia extracta Linder, 1941
- Parartemia informis Linder, 1941
- Parartemia laticaudata Timms, 2010
- Parartemia longicaudata Linder, 1941
- Parartemia minuta Geddes, 1973
- Parartemia mouritzi Timms, 2010
- Parartemia purpurea Timms, 2010
- Parartemia serventyi Linder, 1941
- Parartemia triquetra Timms & Hudson, 2009
- Parartemia veronicae Timms, 2010
- Parartemia yarleensis Timms & Hudson, 2009
- Parartemia zietziana Sayce, 1903
