= Barstow Formation =

Geologic formation in the Mojave Desert, California

- Stratigraphic range: Early to Middle Miocene (Barstovian); ~19.3–13.4 Ma
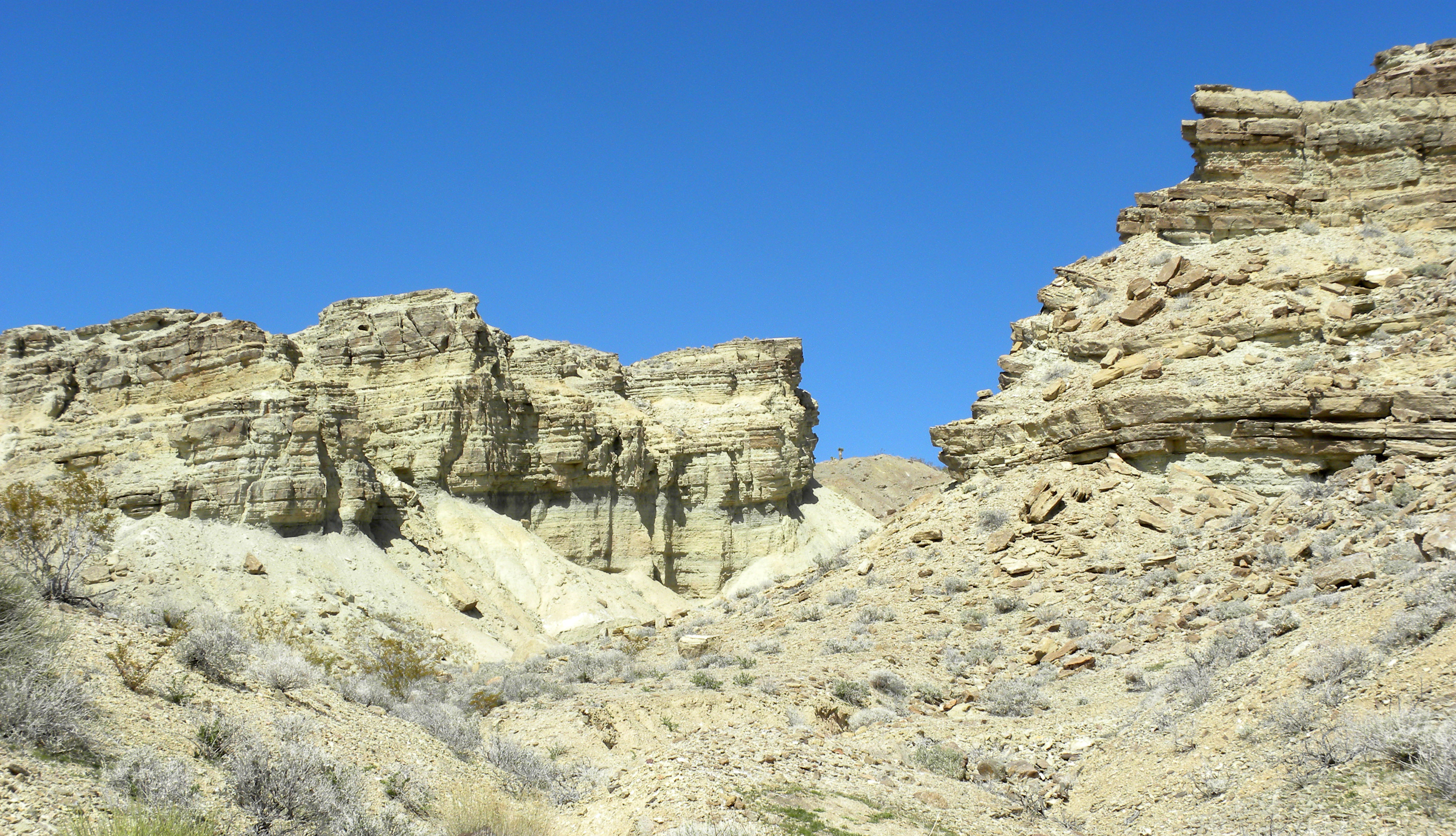
- Barstow Formation exposed in Owl Canyon near Barstow, California.
- Type: Sedimentary

Lithology
- Primary: limestone, shale, siltstone, sandstone, tuff
- Other: conglomerate

Location
- Region: Mojave Desert, California
- Country: United States
- Extent: Northern San Bernardino County, Southeastern California

Type section
- Named for: Barstow, California
- Named by: Hershey (1902)

The Barstow Formation is a series of limestones, conglomerates, sandstones, siltstones and shales exposed in the Mojave Desert near Barstow in San Bernardino County, California.

It is of the early to middle Miocene epoch, (19.3 - 13.4 million years ago) in age, in the Neogene Period. It lends its name to the Barstovian North American land mammal age (NALMA).

The sediments are fluvial and lacustrine in origin except for nine layers of rhyolitic tuff. It is well known for its abundant vertebrate fossils including bones, teeth and footprints. The formation is also renowned for the fossiliferous concretions in its upper member, which contain three-dimensionally preserved arthropods.

== Fossils ==
=== Mammals ===
Mammals from various groups are found in the Barstow Formation. Herbivorous groups include horses, peccaries, oreodonts, camels, pronghorns and other horned artiodactyls, proboscideans, and a rhinoceros. The unit also produces a surprising number of carnivorous mammals, reminiscent of the modern east African savanna to which it has been compared climatically and ecologically. These include a number of borophagines, mustelids, nimravids, Amphicyon, and the primitive bear Hemicyon.

=== Arthropods ===
The arthropods in the upper member of the Barstow Formation are preserved in concretions. The concretions are calcareous and range from 0.125 cm^{3} to 125 cm^{3}. The fossils are typically three-dimensional and, on occasion, exhibit internal anatomy. Due to the preservation of soft-tissue, the Barstow Formation has been identified as a Konservat-Lagerstätte deposit. The fauna was first recognized in 1954 by Allen M. Basset and Allison "Pete" R. Palmer.

The concretions from the Barstow Formation preserve both allochthonous arthropod communities and rare autochthonous arthropod communities. Over 21 orders of arthropods have been recorded. The fossil assemblage is dominated by Diptera (Dasyhelea australis antiqua), Coleoptera (Schistomerus californese), and Anostraca (Archaebranchinecta barstowensis).

== See also ==
- Calico Mountains (California)
- Rainbow Basin
