= Schistomerus =

Schistomerus Temporal range: Middle Miocene, 13.4 Ma

Scientific classification
- Domain: Eukaryota
- Kingdom: Animalia
- Phylum: Arthropoda
- Class: Insecta
- Order: Coleoptera
- Suborder: Adephaga
- Family: Dytiscidae
- Genus: †Schistomerus
- Species: †S. californense

Binomial name
- †Schistomerus californense (Palmer, 1957)

Genus of beetles

Schistomerus is an extinct genus of predaceous diving beetle that is known from one species, Schistomerus californense, which inhabited Lake Barstow during the middle Miocene. It is the most common beetle found in the concretions from the Barstow Formation. The specimens are typically preserved in three dimensions.

All ontogenetic stages of the beetle are present in the concretions. The larval stages of the beetle are most commonly represented, and the mature larvae range from 4.5 - 5.5 mm long. Only 3 adults have been recovered.

Due to the preservational conditions of the formation, a number of individuals were preserved with intact internal anatomy. The tracheal system as well as parts of the organism's nervous system have been described.

== See also ==
- Lagerstätte
