= Smyrna, Washington =

Unincorporated community in Washington, US

- Unincorporated community
- Location within Washington (state) Location within the United States
- Coordinates: 46°50′21″N 119°39′44″W
- Country: United States
- State: Washington
- County: Grant
- Established: 1911
- Elevation: 564 ft (172 m)
- Time zone: UTC-8 (Pacific (PST))
  - Summer (DST): UTC-7 (PDT)
- Area code: 509
- GNIS feature ID: 1511323

Smyrna is an unincorporated community in Grant County, in the U.S. state of Washington.

== History ==
A post office called Smyrna was established in 1911 and remained in operation until 1964. The community was named after the ancient city of Smyrna.
