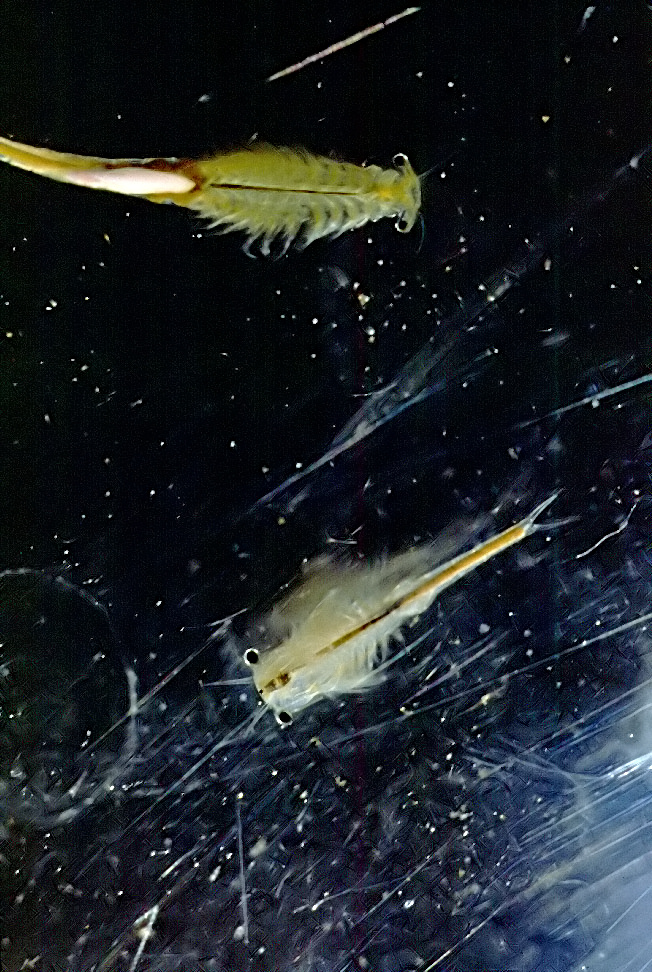
- Branchinecta packardi

Scientific classification
- Kingdom: Animalia
- Phylum: Arthropoda
- Clade: Pancrustacea
- Class: Branchiopoda
- Order: Anostraca
- Family: Branchinectidae
- Genus: Branchinecta; Verrill, 1869

Species
- See text

= Branchinecta =

Genus of small freshwater animals

Branchinecta is a genus of fairy shrimp in family Branchinectidae. It includes around 50 species, found on all continents except Australia. Branchinecta gigas, the giant fairy shrimp, is the largest species in the order, with a length of up to 10 centimetres (4 in), and Branchinecta brushi lives at the highest altitude of any crustacean, at 5,930 metres (19,460 ft), a record it shares with the copepod Boeckella palustris. A new genus, Archaebranchinecta was established in 2011 for two species previously placed in Branchinecta.

== Species ==
- Branchinecta achalensis Cesar, 1985
- Branchinecta belki Maeda-Martínez, Obregón-Barboza & Dumont, 1992
- Branchinecta brushi Hegna & Lazo-Wasem, 2010
- Branchinecta campestris Lynch, 1960 – pocket-pouch fairy shrimp
- Branchinecta coloradensis Packard, 1874 – Colorado fairy shrimp
- Branchinecta constricta Rogers, 2006
- Branchinecta conservatio Eng, Belk & Eriksen, 1990 – conservancy fairy shrimp
- Branchinecta cornigera Lynch, 1958 – horned fairy shrimp
- Branchinecta dissimilis Lynch, 1972 – Great Basin fairy shrimp
- Branchinecta ferox (M. Milne-Edwards, 1840)
- Branchinecta gaini Daday, 1910
- Branchinecta gigas Lynch, 1937 – giant fairy shrimp
- Branchinecta granulosa Daday, 1902
- Branchinecta hiberna Rogers & Fugate, 2001 – winter fairy shrimp
- Branchinecta iheringi Lilljeborg, 1889
- Branchinecta kaibabensis Belk & Fugate, 2000 – Kaibab fairy shrimp
- Branchinecta lateralis Rogers, 2006
- Branchinecta leonensis Cesar, 1985
- Branchinecta lindahli Packard, 1883 – versatile fairy shrimp
- Branchinecta longiantenna Eng, Belk & Eriksen, 1990 – longhorn fairy shrimp
- Branchinecta lynchi Eng, Belk & Eriksen, 1990 – vernal pool fairy shrimp
- Branchinecta lutulenta Rogers and Hill, 2013 - muddy fairy shrimp
- Branchinecta mackini Dexter, 1956 – alkali fairy shrimp
- Branchinecta mediospina Rogers, Dasis & Murrow, 2011
- Branchinecta mesovallensis Belk & Fugate, 2000 – mid-valley fairy shrimp
- Branchinecta mexicana Maeda-Martínez, Obregón-Barboza & Dumont, 1992
- Branchinecta minuta Smirnov, 1948
- Branchinecta oriena Belk & Rogers, 2002
- Branchinecta orientalis G. O. Sars, 1901
- Branchinecta oterosanvicentei Obregón-Barboza, et al., 2002
- Branchinecta packardi Pearse, 1912 – Packard fairy shrimp
- Branchinecta paludosa (O. F. Müller, 1788) – circumpolar fairy shrimp
- Branchinecta palustris Birabén, 1946
- Branchinecta papillosa Birabén, 1946
- Branchinecta potassa Belk, 1979 – Nebraska fairy shrimp
- Branchinecta prima Cohen, 1983
- Branchinecta raptor Rogers, Quinney, Weaver, and Olesen 2006
- Branchinecta readingi Belk, 2000 – Reading fairy shrimp
- Branchinecta rocaensis Cohen, 1982
- Branchinecta sandiegonensis Fugate, 1993 – San Diego fairy shrimp
- Branchinecta serrata Rogers, 2006
- Branchinecta somuncurensis Cohen, 1983
- Branchinecta tarensis Birabén, 1946
- Branchinecta tolli (G. O. Sars, 1897)
- Branchinecta valchetana Cohen, 1981
- Branchinecta vuriloche Cohen, 1985
