= Eugen von Daday =

Romanian zoologist (1855–1920)

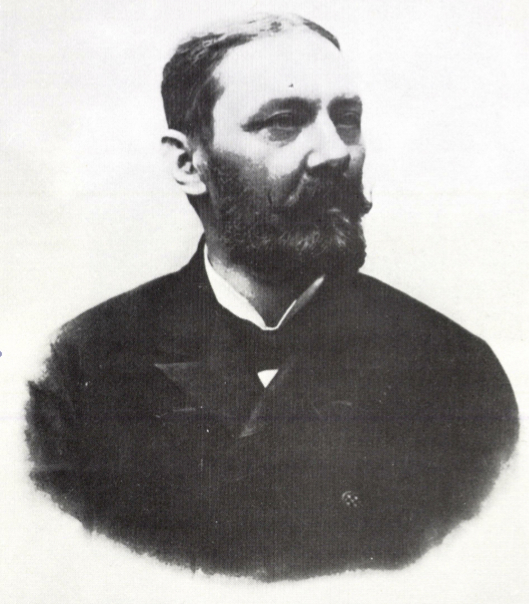
Eugen von Daday

Eugen von Daday or Jenő von Daday (1855–1920) was an ethnic Romanian professor of zoology in Hungary in the late 19th and early 20th century. Daday was an expert on aquatic invertebrates, particularly crustaceans. Daday collected and identified many species and genera within the borders of the Hungarian empire, and received samples of invertebrates from collectors around the world. After his death in 1920, Daday's collection of crustaceans was acquired by the Hungarian Natural History Museum.
