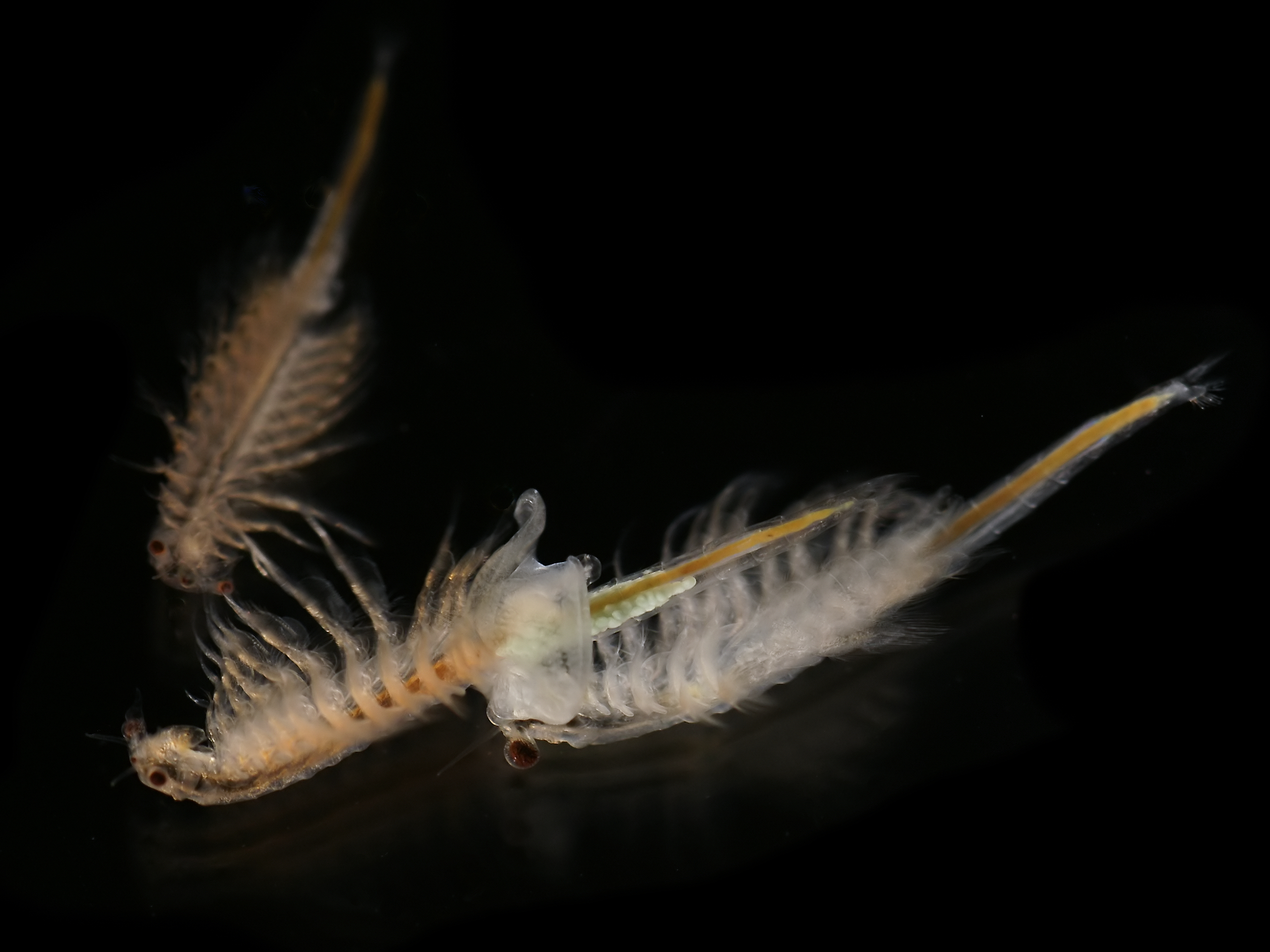
- Artemia salina

Scientific classification
- Kingdom: Animalia
- Phylum: Arthropoda
- Clade: Pancrustacea
- Class: Branchiopoda
- Subclass: Sarsostraca; Tasch, 1969
- Order: Anostraca; G. O. Sars, 1867

Families
- Artemiidae Grochowski, 1896; Branchinectidae Daday, 1910; Branchipodidae Simon, 1886; Chirocephalidae Daday, 1910; Parartemiidae Daday, 1910; Streptocephalidae Daday, 1910; Tanymastigidae Weekers et al., 2002; Thamnocephalidae Simon, 1886

= Anostraca =

Anostraca Temporal range: Devonian–Recent

Order of crustaceans

Anostraca is one of the four orders of crustaceans in the class Branchiopoda; its members are referred to as fairy shrimp. They live in vernal pools and hypersaline lakes across the world, and they have even been found in deserts, ice-covered mountain lakes, and Antarctic ice. They are usually 6–25 mm (0.24–0.98 in) long (exceptionally up to 170 mm or 6.7 in). Most species have 20 body segments, bearing 11 pairs of leaf-like phyllopodia (swimming legs), and the body lacks a carapace. They swim "upside-down" and feed by filtering organic particles from the water or by scraping algae from surfaces, with the exception of Branchinecta gigas, or "giant fairy shrimp", which is itself a predator of other species of anostracans. They are an important food for many birds and fish, and some are cultured and harvested for use as fish food. There are 300 species spread across 8 families.

== Description ==
The body of a fairy shrimp is elongated and divided into segments. The whole animal is typically 6–25 millimetres (0.24–0.98 in) long, but one species, Branchinecta gigas does not reach sexual maturity until it reaches 50 mm (2.0 in) long, and can grow to 170 mm (6.7 in) long. The exoskeleton is thin and flexible, and lacks any sign of a carapace. The body can be divided into three distinct parts (tagmata) – head, thorax and abdomen.

=== Head ===
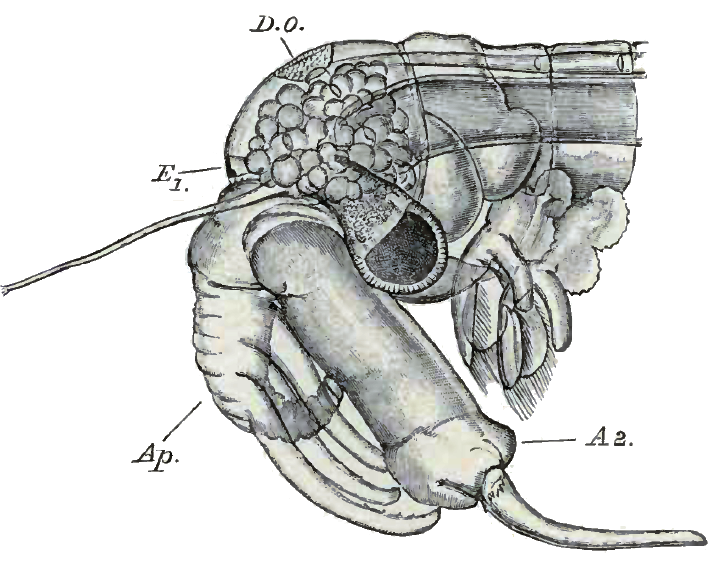
Drawing of the head of Chirocephalus diaphanus (Chirocephalidae), showing the first antenna (A1), second antenna (A2) and frontal appendage (Ap)

The head is morphologically distinct from the thorax. It bears two compound eyes on prominent stalks, and two pairs of antennae. The first pair of antennae are small, usually unsegmented, and uniramous. The second pair are long and cylindrical in females, but in males they are enlarged and specialised for holding the female during mating. In some groups, males have an additional frontal appendage.

=== Thorax and abdomen ===
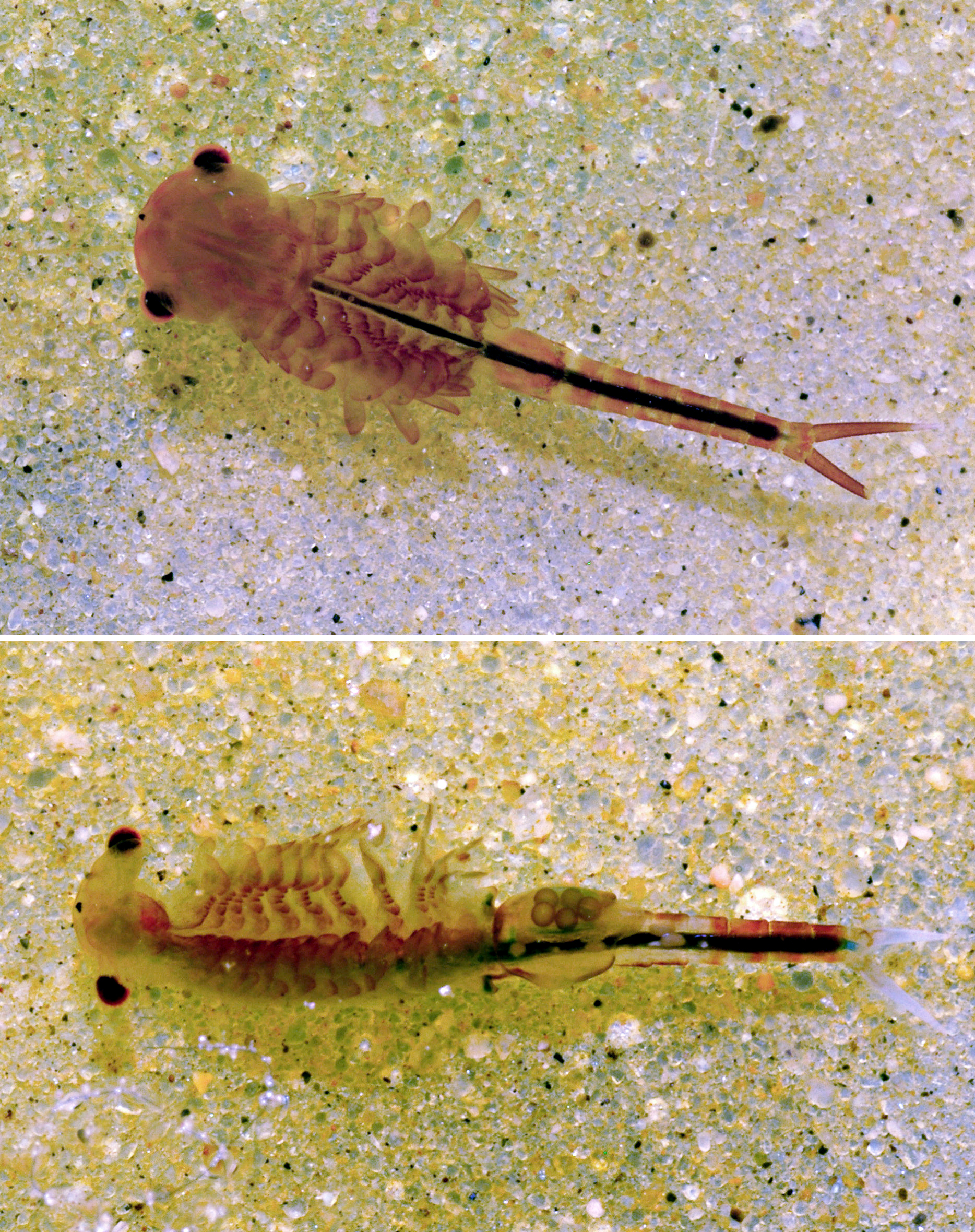
Male (top) and female (bottom) Eubranchipus grubii (Chirocephalidae): the female is holding eggs on her genital appendages.

The thorax of most anostracans has 13 segments (19 in Polyartemiella and 21 in Polyartemia). All but the last two are very similar, with a pair of biramous phyllopods (flattened, leaf-like appendages). The last two segments are fused together, and their appendages are specialised for reproduction. Most anostracans have separate sexes (gonochorism), but a few reproduce by parthenogenesis. The abdomen comprises 6 segments without appendages, and a telson, which bears two flattened caudal rami or "cercopods".

=== Internal anatomy ===
The head contains two digestive glands and the small lobate stomach into which they empty. This is connected to a long intestine, which terminates in a short rectum, with the anus located on the telson. The haemocoel of anostracans is pumped by a long, tubular heart, which runs through most of the animal's length. A series of slits allow haemocoel into the heart, which is then pumped out of the anterior opening by peristalsis. The nervous system consists of two nerve cords which run the length of the body, with two ganglia and two transverse commissures in most of the body segments.

Gas exchange is thought to take place through the entire body surface, but especially that of the phyllopodia and their associated gills, which may also be responsible for osmotic regulation. Two coiled glands at the bases of the maxillae are used to excrete nitrogenous waste, typically in the form of urea. Most of the animal's nitrogenous waste is, however, in the form of ammonia, which probably diffuses into the environment through the phyllopodia and gills.

== Ecology and behaviour ==
Anostracans inhabit inland waters ranging from hypersaline lakes to lakes that are almost devoid of dissolved substances; they are "the most archetypal crustaceans" in ephemeral waters. The relatively large size of fairy shrimp, together with their slow means of locomotion, makes them an easy target for predatory fish and waterfowl. This has led to their distribution being restricted to environments with fewer predators, such as vernal pools, salt lakes and lakes at high altitudes or latitudes. The southernmost recorded fairy shrimp is Branchinecta gaini from the Antarctic Peninsula, while the altitude record is held by B. brushi, which lives at 5,930 metres (19,460 ft) in the Chilean Andes. Other genera, such as Streptocephalus, occur in deserts throughout the world.

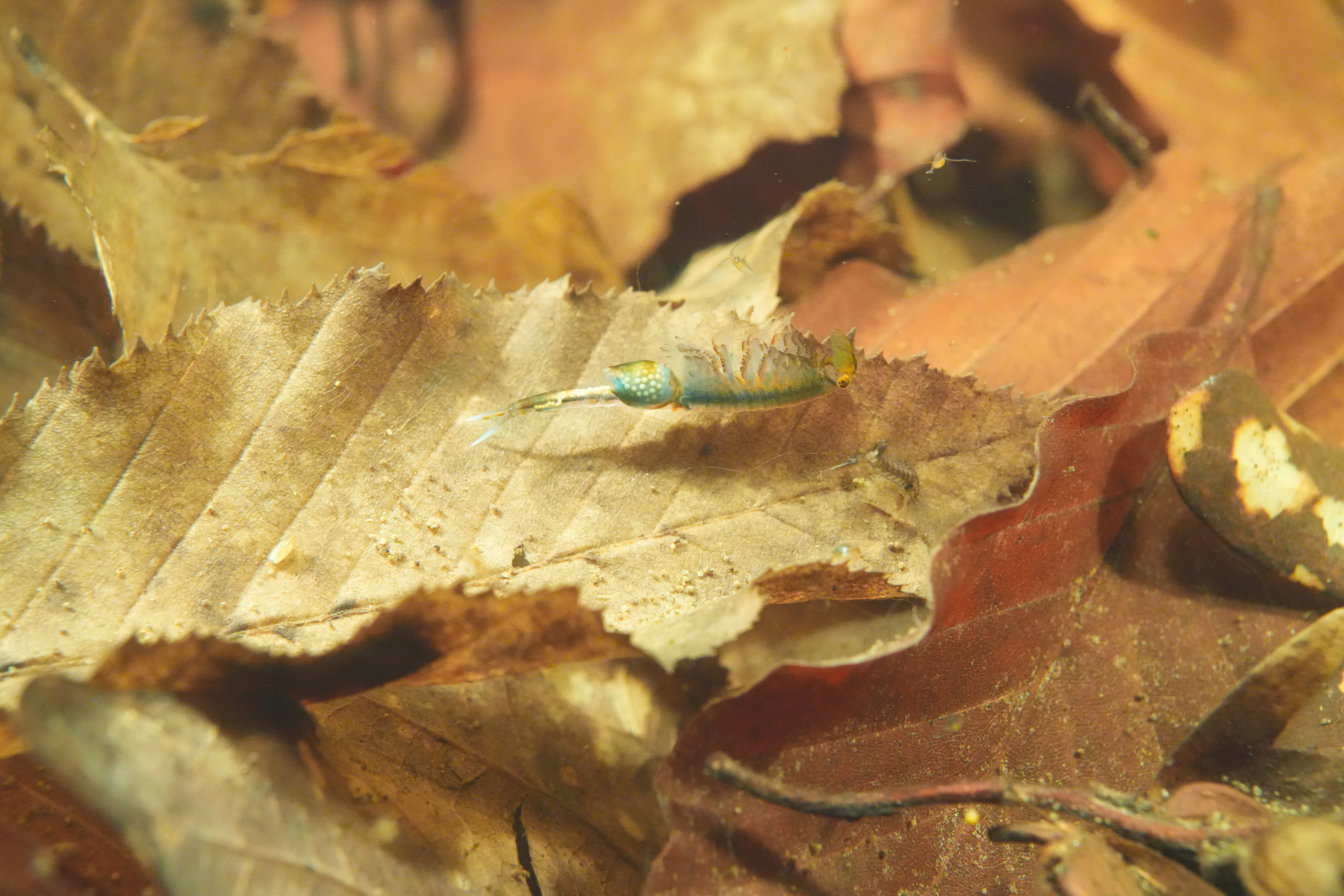
Eubranchipus grubii in an ephemeral pond in a forest in Germany

Anostracans swim gracefully by movements of their phyllopodia (thoracic appendages) in a metachronal rhythm. When swimming, the animal's ventral side is normally uppermost (often described as swimming "upside-down"). They filter food indiscriminately from the water as they swim, but also scrape algae and other organic materials from solid surfaces, for which they turn to have their ventral side against the food surface.

Another important aspect of the fairy shrimp’s life cycle is their universal ability to enter diapause, a state of biological dormancy where growth and metabolism are arrested, as an egg (or cyst). This trait assists in both species' dispersal and in overcoming adverse environmental conditions. Once dormant, these cysts can withstand conditions as harsh and diverse as droughts, frosts, hypersalinity, complete desiccation, exposure to UV radiation and the vacuum of space. It is also the only way for the fairy shrimps to colonize new habitats—facilitated by a variety of conditions including wind, predators, currents—as the soft-bodied adults are unable to leave the freshwater system. Once in diapause, these cysts can remain viable for centuries, and the mixing of system sediment results in the hatching of different aged cysts in each generation. This inbreeding slows the rate of selection by resisting gene flow and minimizing phenotypic variation, in turn promoting the stability of the existing, successful phenotype.

Anostracans are an important food source for many birds and fish. For example, they provide much of the food for female pintails and mallards in the Prairie Pothole Region of the Great Plains in North America, especially in years when temporary wetlands are abundant. Similarly, Artemia forms an important part of the diet of flamingos wherever it can be found.

== Uses ==
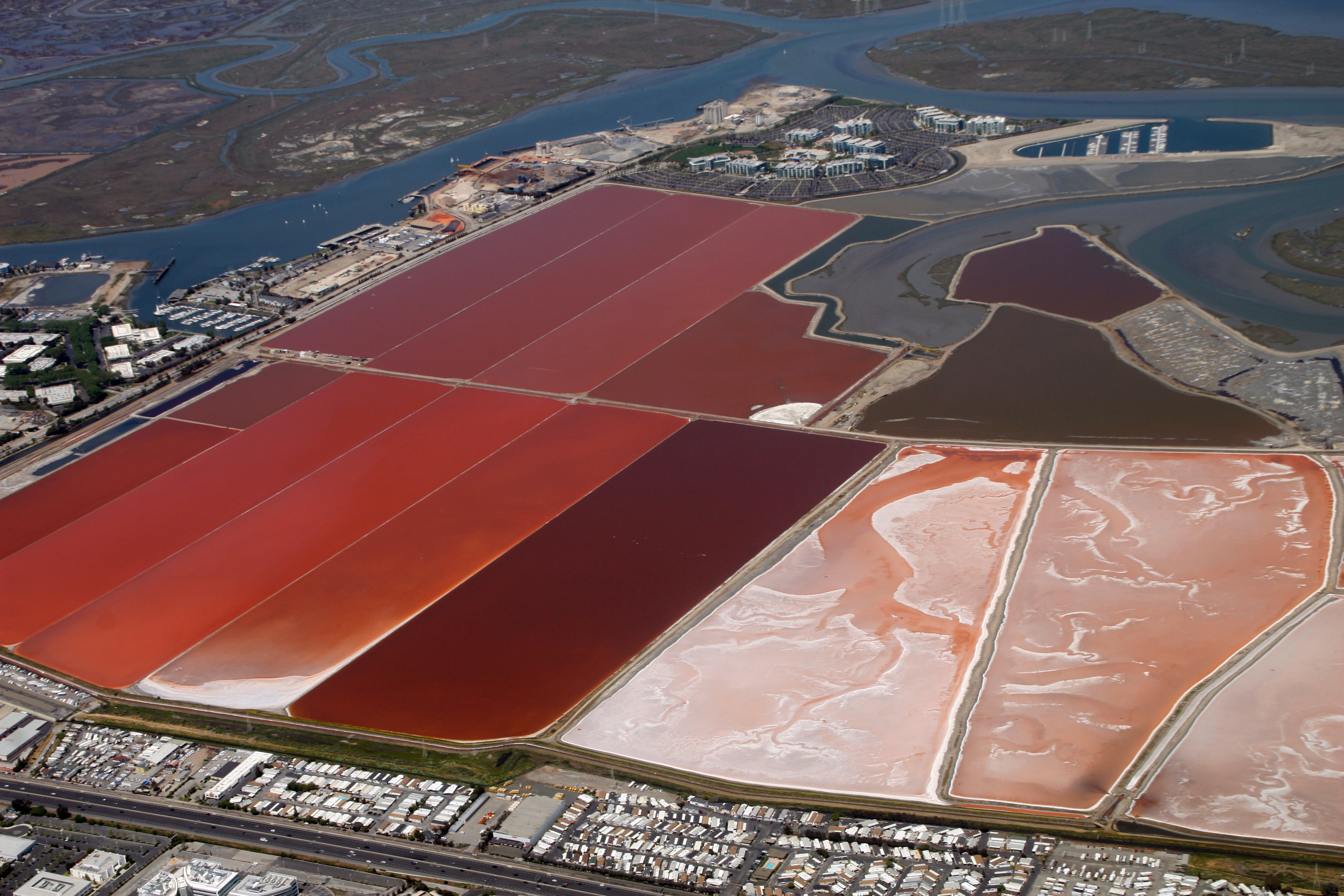
San Francisco Bay Salt Ponds: the orange colour is produced by the presence of Artemia.

Brine shrimp are used as food for fish and other organisms in aquaria and aquaculture. Their drought-resistant eggs are collected from lakeshores and are stored and transported dry. They hatch readily when submerged in salt water. This is a multimillion-dollar industry, centred on the Great Salt Lake in Utah and San Francisco Bay in California; adults are collected from Mono Lake and transported frozen.

== Fossil record and evolution ==
Fairy shrimp are believed to have diverged from the main line of Branchiopoda during the Ordovician period, around the same time it is thought they colonized freshwater and estuarine ecosystems. This transition is believed to have resulted from selection pressure to escape predation in the Early Paleozoic seas. Lepidocaris from the early Devonian Rhynie chert is likely a close relative of Anostraca. The oldest known modern-looking ansotracan is Haltinnaias from the late Devonian (Famennian) Strud locality of Belgium, around 365 million years old.

Some studies point to fossils resembling fairy shrimp in the Upper Cambrian, specifically the oldest known branchiopod fossil, Rehbachiella kinnekullensis, from Orsten marine deposits. Despite its seeming resemblance to modern fairy shrimp, this fossil is still considered by most to be an outlying member of the ancestral marine Branchiopoda rather than an actual fairy shrimp.

The monophyly of this order is well supported, and the scientific community has reached consensus that Anostraca was the first group to branch off from the Branchiopoda.

The radiation hypothesis championing rapid spread and colonization during the Gondwana fragmentation closely echoes the current distribution of the order. Presently, Anostraca are found on all seven continents. Most extant genera have restricted geographical distributions. Only three genera are widespread across the remnants of the former supercontinent Pangaea: Artemia, Branchinella and Branchinecta, while the remaining genera are found only throughout former Laurasia. This suggests that much of the potential habitat in this supercontinent, now occupied by Anostraca, was previously unoccupied by ecologically similar species, or inhabited by species with less adaptive ability. Studies have found Anostraca capable of rapid colonization and speciation.

== Diversity ==
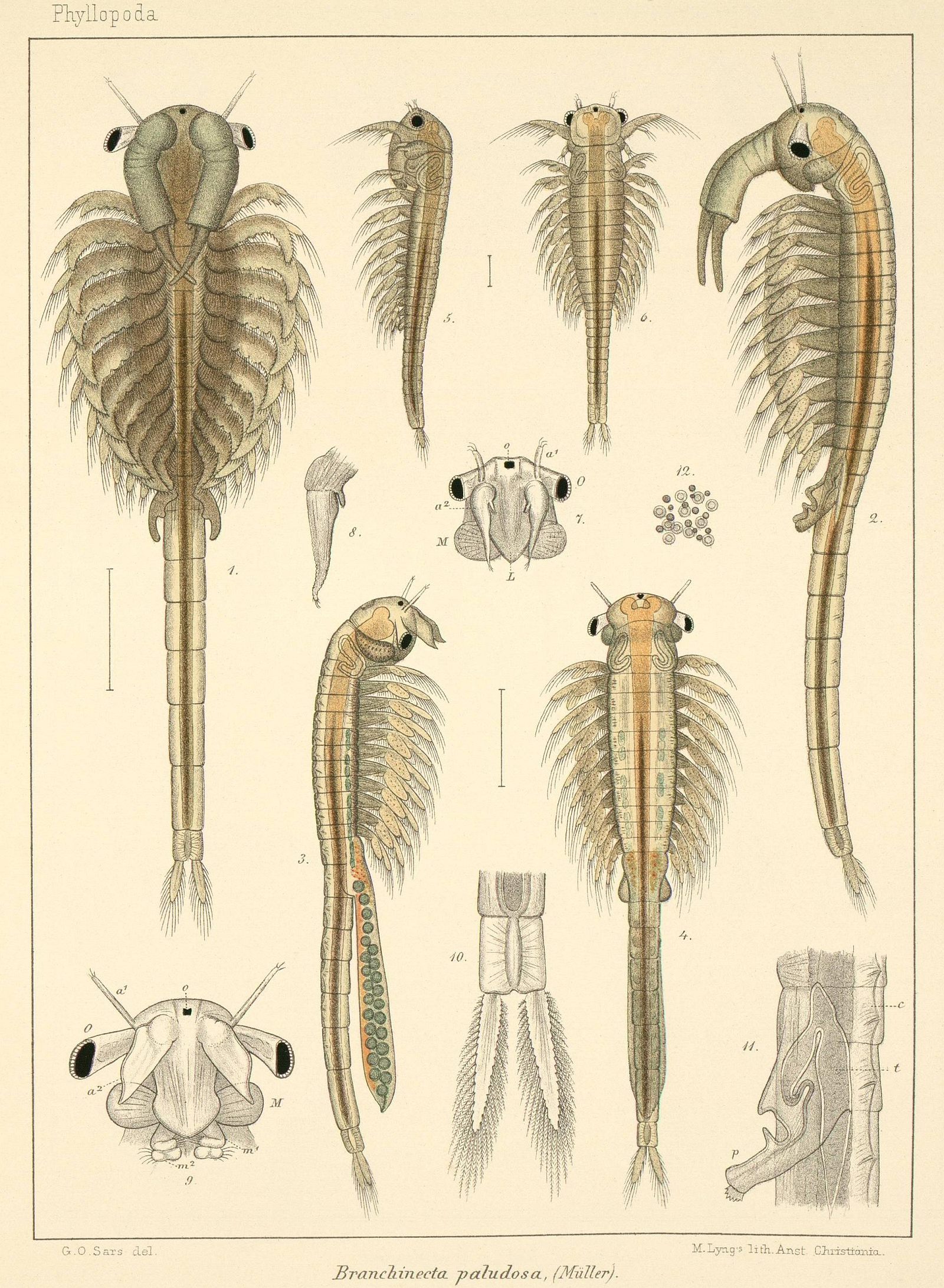
Anatomical drawings of Branchinecta paludosa (Branchinectidae) from Georg Ossian Sars' Fauna Norvegiae (1896)

Anostraca comprises around 355 species, grouped into 29 genera in eight families:

- Artemiidae – 1 genus, 6 species
- Branchinectidae – 2 genus, 50 species
- Branchipodidae – 6 genera, 35 species
- Chirocephalidae – 9 genera, 89 species
- Parartemiidae – 1 genus, 18 species
- Streptocephalidae – 1 genus, 68 species
- Tanymastigidae – 2 genera, 8 species
- Thamnocephalidae – 7 genera, 81 species

== Fairy Shrimp in Popular Culture ==
Fairy Shrimp has been a student favorite as the mascot of UC Merced. There have been several efforts to make this animal the official mascot of the campus. Still, in 2001 the bobcat was chosen instead. Fairy shrimp had also been the focus of a challenge to the location of where the campus would be built because of their nearby vernal pool habitat.
