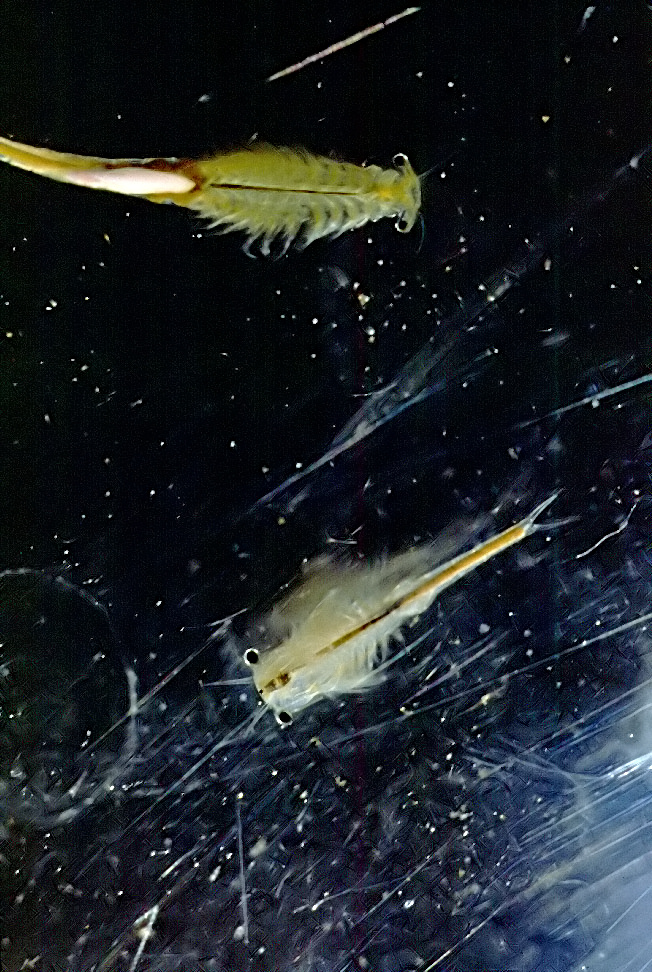
- Branchinecta packardi

Scientific classification
- Kingdom: Animalia
- Phylum: Arthropoda
- Clade: Pancrustacea
- Class: Branchiopoda
- Order: Anostraca
- Suborder: Anostracina
- Family: Branchinectidae; Daday, 1910

= Branchinectidae =

Family of small freshwater animals

Branchinectidae is a family in the order Anostraca (fairy shrimp), containing two genera – Branchinecta and Archaebranchinecta. The majority of the species are in the genus Branchinecta, with only Archaebranchinecta pollicifera and the fossil Archaebranchinecta barstowensis in the second genus.
