= Tuctoria mucronata =

Conservation status
- Critically Imperiled (NatureServe)

Scientific classification
- Kingdom: Plantae
- Clade: Tracheophytes
- Clade: Angiosperms
- Clade: Monocots
- Clade: Commelinids
- Order: Poales
- Family: Poaceae
- Subfamily: Chloridoideae
- Genus: Tuctoria
- Species: T. mucronata

Binomial name
- Tuctoria mucronata (Crampton) J. Reeder

Species of flowering plant

The grass Tuctoria mucronata, which is known by several common names including prickly spiralgrass, Solano grass, and Crampton's tuctoria, is a federally listed endangered plant species endemic to two counties in northern California.

== Description ==
It is a small, annually growing plant with stems growing decumbent against the ground to a maximum length of 12 cm (4.7 in), and turning upward at the tips. The leaves are 2–4 cm (0.79–1.57 in) long and secrete a sticky, aromatic juice. In the spring, the grass bears a small inflorescence 1.5–6 cm (0.59–2.36 in) long, with numerous crowded spikelets.

== Ecology ==
Solano grass is a vernal pool plant. It is only found in these seasonally wet areas, a type of habitat that is endangered. This species is thought to have once grown in isolated parts of the northern Sacramento-San Joaquin Delta, in areas that flooded during the wet season, but any former habitat there has been long since reclaimed for agriculture. Only a few individuals of the plant now exist, mostly in Yolo County. It was found during the 1990s at Jepson Prairie Preserve, an area dedicated to conserving vernal pool habitat, but it may no longer exist there.

Loss of critical habitat is the main cause of the near extinction of Solano grass. This loss is caused by land reclamation for development, recreation, and agricultural use, including for grazing animals, fertilizer runoff, and disturbance of the natural hydrology of the Central Valley. Invasive plants have also played a role in crowding out more delicate native grasses, such as Solano grass, Greene's tuctoria (Tuctoria greenei), Colusa grass (Neostapfia colusana), and several species of genus Orcuttia.
