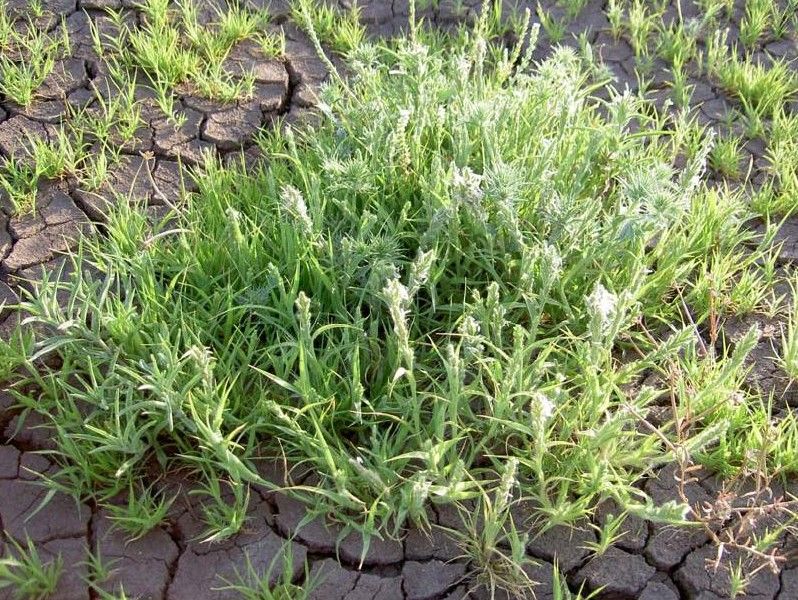
- Tuctoria greenei

Scientific classification
- Kingdom: Plantae
- Clade: Tracheophytes
- Clade: Angiosperms
- Clade: Monocots
- Clade: Commelinids
- Order: Poales
- Family: Poaceae
- Subfamily: Chloridoideae
- Tribe: Cynodonteae
- Subtribe: Orcuttiinae
- Genus: Tuctoria; J.Reeder

Type species
- Tuctoria fragilis (Swallen) J.Reeder

Species
- T. fragilis T. greenei T. mucronata

= Tuctoria =

Genus of flowering plants

Tuctoria is a genus of three species of grass in the family Poaceae. Spiralgrass is a common name for plants in this genus. These are bunchgrass species that are found in vernal pools of central California and Baja California, Mexico. The plants are annuals that germinate under water in the spring and grow submerged for weeks. After the pools dry down, the grasses initiate a new set of foliage that lasts for one to two months until flowering and fruiting are complete.

== Taxonomy ==
The genus was circumscribed by John R. Reeder in 1982. Along with Orcuttia and Neostapfia, Tuctoria is one of three genera in the tribe Orcuttieae, previously outlined by Reeder in 1965. All three Tuctoria species were formerly assigned to Orcuttia, the type genus of Orcuttieae. Reeder erected Tuctoria after determining that the three species were more closely related among themselves than to any of the other Orcuttia species. Shared features include chromosome numbers, the spiral arrangement of spikelets on the rachis, the absence of juvenile leaves, the presence of lodicules, and the presence of an epiblast in the seed embryos. The name Tuctoria is an anagram of Orcuttia.

Recent (2010) molecular phylogenetic analysis suggests that Tuctoria is not monophyletic as currently circumscribed, and is in need of taxonomic revision.

== Description ==
Tuctoria species have their spikelets spirally arranged on the axis; lemmas are entire (with a smooth, even margin) or denticulate (finely toothed), and often have a centrally placed short, sharp tip (mucro). The inflorescence is not cylindrical (as in Neostapfia), and the spikelets are laterally flattened. The lemmas are narrower, the tip is mucronate or otherwise entire or denticulate. The caryopsis is not sticky, and the brown embryo is visible throughout the light-colored pericarp.

== Species ==
There are three species in Tuctoria.

- Tuctoria fragilis (originally described as Orcuttia fragilis by Jason Richard Swallen in 1944). Found in Baja California (Mexico), it has culms up to 50 cm (20 in) long, inflorescences often numbering several from the upper nodes, and a caryopsis that is somewhat pear-shaped and wrinkled.
- Tuctoria greenei (originally Orcuttia grenei − Vasey). Found in California, it has culms less than 20 cm (8 in) long, with the inflorescence terminal on the flowering culm. The caryopsis is 2 mm (0.08 in) long and oblong, and wrinkled.
- Tuctoria mucronata (originally Orcuttia mucronata − Crampton). Endemic to Solano County south of Dixon, Northern California. Its inflorescence is partially included in the upper lead, and its lemmas taper gradually to a mucronate tip. The caryopsis is smooth, measuring 3 mm (0.1 in) long.

== Ecology and distribution ==
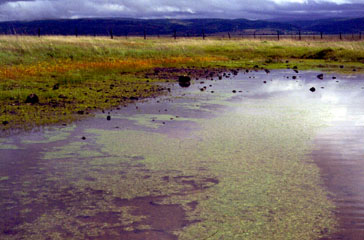
Vernal pool in Sacramento Valley, central California

Tuctoria species are endemic to seasonal pools in the southwestern US. Like all species in tribe Orcuttieae, the growth of Tuctoria species is initiated underwater. When pools dry, the plants undergo a metamorphosis whereby aquatic foliage is replaced with terrestrial foliage. The terrestrial foliage has Kranz anatomy, indicating the use of C-4 photosynthesis. This adaptation help the plants survive the longs periods of drought-like conditions experienced when the pools dry. In years with little rainfall, their seed banks remain dormant until a season of rainfall that is adequate to fill the pool basins. In T. greenei, germination is almost entirely dependent upon a combination of anaerobic conditions and light. This strategy helps the plant begin germination when pool basins are filled with water. In years of low precipitation, the soil subsurface is likely to be anaerobic or hypoxic, and inhibit germination.

Tuctoria greenei is of high conservation concern in California, as vernal pool systems are in decline due to agricultural development and urban expansion.

== See also ==
- List of Poaceae genera
