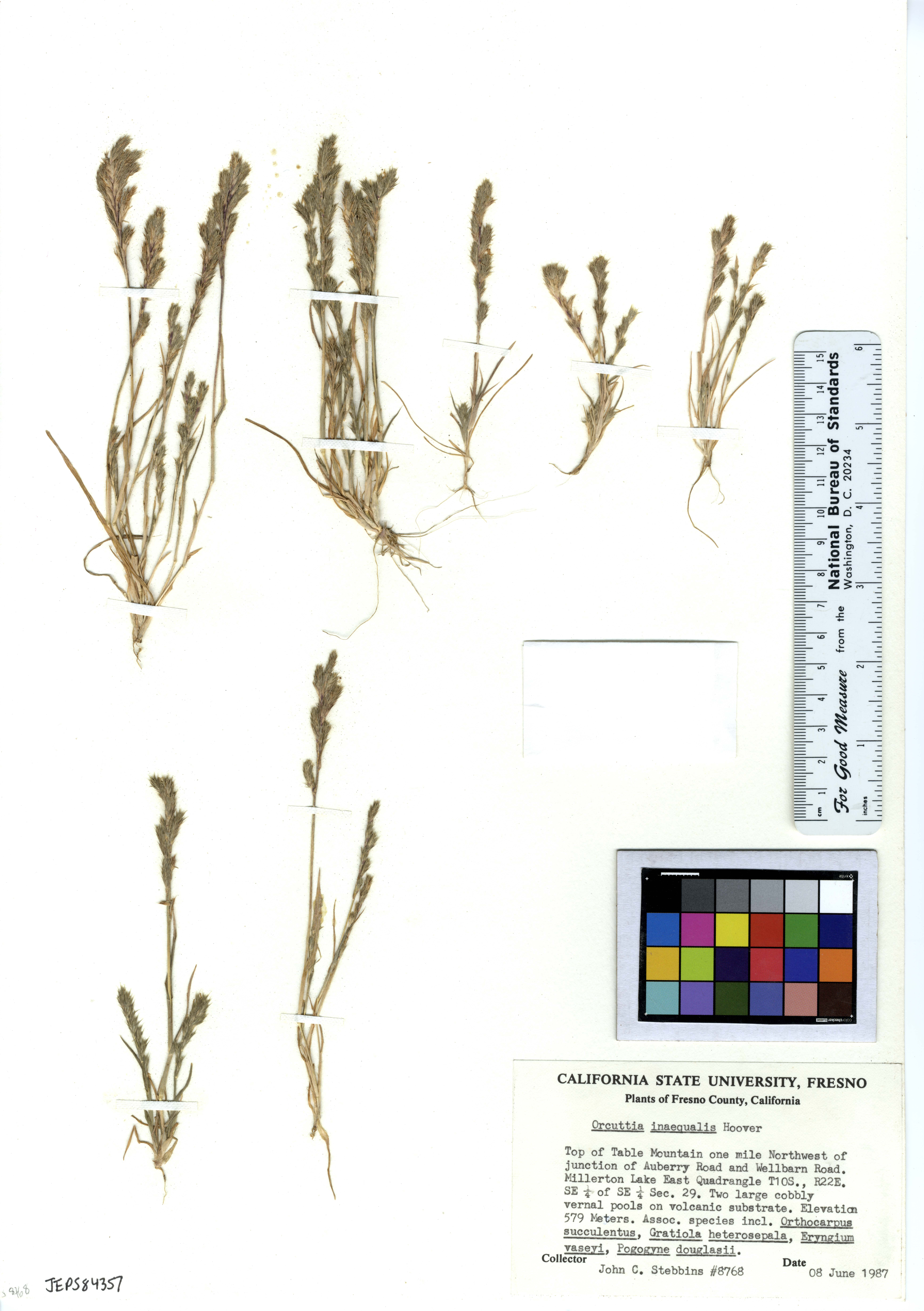

Conservation status
- Threatened (ESA)

Scientific classification
- Kingdom: Plantae
- Clade: Tracheophytes
- Clade: Angiosperms
- Clade: Monocots
- Clade: Commelinids
- Order: Poales
- Family: Poaceae
- Subfamily: Chloridoideae
- Genus: Orcuttia
- Species: O. inaequalis

Binomial name
- Orcuttia inaequalis Hoover

= Orcuttia inaequalis =

Species of flowering plant

Orcuttia inaequalis is a rare species of grass known by the common name San Joaquin Valley Orcutt grass.

== Distribution ==
It is endemic to the Central Valley of California, where it grows only in vernal pools, a rare and declining type of habitat. Many known occurrences of the plant have been extirpated as land in the heavily agricultural Central Valley has been altered, and it was federally listed as a threatened species in 1997.

== Description ==
Orcuttia inaequalis is a small, hairy, gray-green annual bunchgrass forming tufts or mats up to about 15 centimeters tall. The fluffy, clustered inflorescence is a dense, headlike mass of spikelets, the characteristic that separates this Orcutt grass from the others, which have more spreading inflorescences.
