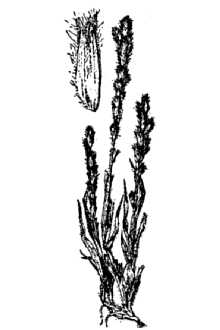

Conservation status
- Endangered (ESA)

Scientific classification
- Kingdom: Plantae
- Clade: Tracheophytes
- Clade: Angiosperms
- Clade: Monocots
- Clade: Commelinids
- Order: Poales
- Family: Poaceae
- Subfamily: Chloridoideae
- Genus: Orcuttia
- Species: O. pilosa

Binomial name
- Orcuttia pilosa Hoover

= Orcuttia pilosa =

Species of flowering plant

Orcuttia pilosa is a rare species of grass known by the common name Hairy Orcutt grass.

== Distribution ==
It is endemic to the Central Valley of California, where it grows only in vernal pools, a rare and declining type of habitat. Many known occurrences of the plant have been extirpated as land in the heavily agricultural Central Valley has been altered, and it was federally listed as an endangered species in 1997. In that year there were 25 known remaining populations of the grass, only 12 of which were considered stable.

== Description ==
Orcuttia pilosa is a small, densely hairy annual bunchgrass forming tufts up to about 20 centimeters tall when growing erect. The inflorescence is a crowded cluster of overlapping hairy spikelets.

== See also ==
- Orcuttia - all species
