= G. neglecta =

G. neglecta may refer to:

- Godinotia neglecta, an extinct lemur-like prosimian species that lived during the Eocene epoch
- Gratiola neglecta, the clammy hedgehyssop, a plant species

== See also ==
- Neglecta (disambiguation)
