= G. officinalis =

G. officinalis may refer to:

- Galega officinalis, an herbaceous plant species
- Gratiola officinalis, an ornamental plant species

== See also ==
- Officinalis
