= O. californica =

O. californica may refer to:

- Oenothera californica, a synonym of the California evening primrose, a flowering plant species native to parts of the southwestern United States and Baja California
- Orcuttia californica, the California Orcutt grass, a rare grass species native to southern California and northern Baja California
- Orobanche californica, the California broomrape, a plant species native to western North America
- Osmia californica, a mason bee species native to North America

== See also ==
- List of Latin and Greek words commonly used in systematic names § C
