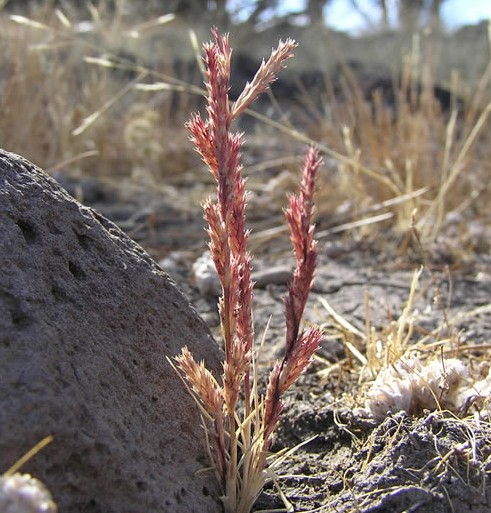

Conservation status
- Threatened (ESA)

Scientific classification
- Kingdom: Plantae
- Clade: Tracheophytes
- Clade: Angiosperms
- Clade: Monocots
- Clade: Commelinids
- Order: Poales
- Family: Poaceae
- Subfamily: Chloridoideae
- Genus: Orcuttia
- Species: O. tenuis

Binomial name
- Orcuttia tenuis Hitchc.

= Orcuttia tenuis =

Species of flowering plant

Orcuttia tenuis, the slender Orcutt grass, is a species of grass which is endemic to northern California.

== Description ==
It grows in vernal pool habitat in the western and northern foothills surrounding the Sacramento Valley.

Orcuttia tenuis is a federally listed threatened species.
