= Herb of grace =

Herb of grace can refer to several separate plants.

- In Europe, generally another name for rue, Ruta graveolens of the family Rutaceae
- In the USA, usually a name for Bacopa monnieri of the family Plantaginaceae (formerly Scrophulariaceae)
- Sometimes used as a name for Gratiola officinalis
