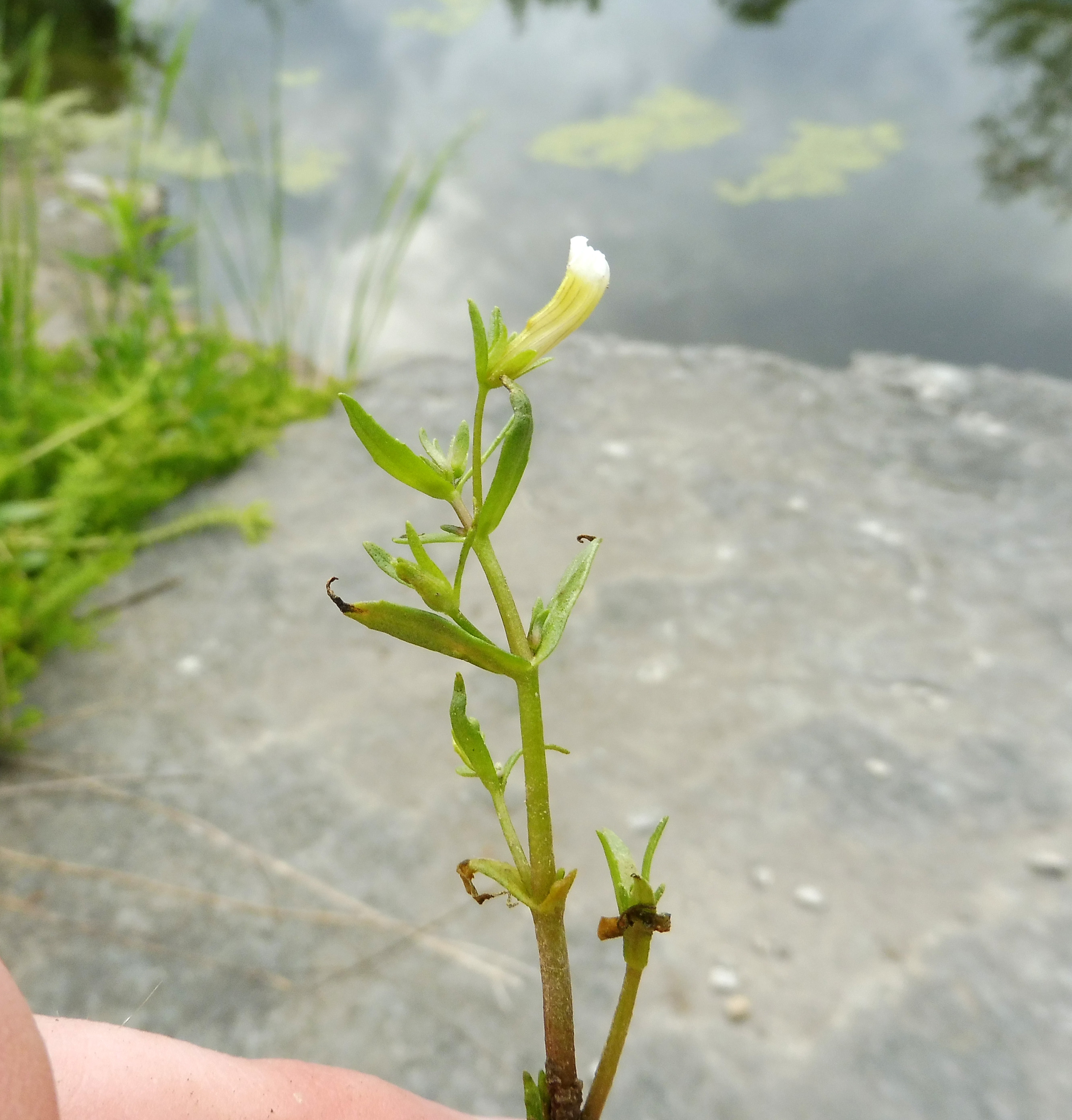

Conservation status
- Vulnerable (NatureServe)

Scientific classification
- Kingdom: Plantae
- Clade: Tracheophytes
- Clade: Angiosperms
- Clade: Eudicots
- Clade: Asterids
- Order: Lamiales
- Family: Plantaginaceae
- Genus: Gratiola
- Species: G. quartermaniae

Binomial name
- Gratiola quartermaniae D.Estes

= Gratiola quartermaniae =

Species of flowering plant

Gratiola quartermaniae, commonly known as the Quarterman's hedge-hyssop or limestone hedge-hyssop, is a species of flowering plant in the plantain family. It is native to eastern North America.

This species has a highly fragmented range. It is most common in the Interior Low Plateaus of Alabama and Tennessee. There are disjunct populations in the Edwards Plateau of Texas, northern Illinois, the Pennyroyal Plain of Kentucky, and to southern Ontario. In each of these wide-ranging locations it is found on areas of pooling water over flat limestone outcrops, in habitats such as cedar glades and alvars. It is likely that this newly described species is more widespread than is currently realized. Due to its highly scattered range and restricted habitat, as well as the threat of habitat destruction in middle Tennessee, this species is considered vulnerable.

This species was first described in 2007. It is closely related to Gratiola neglecta, which collections were previously identified as. It is distinguished by its more linear leaves, its nearly hairless midstem, and its thicker seeds.

It produces tubular, cream-colored flowers in the spring.
