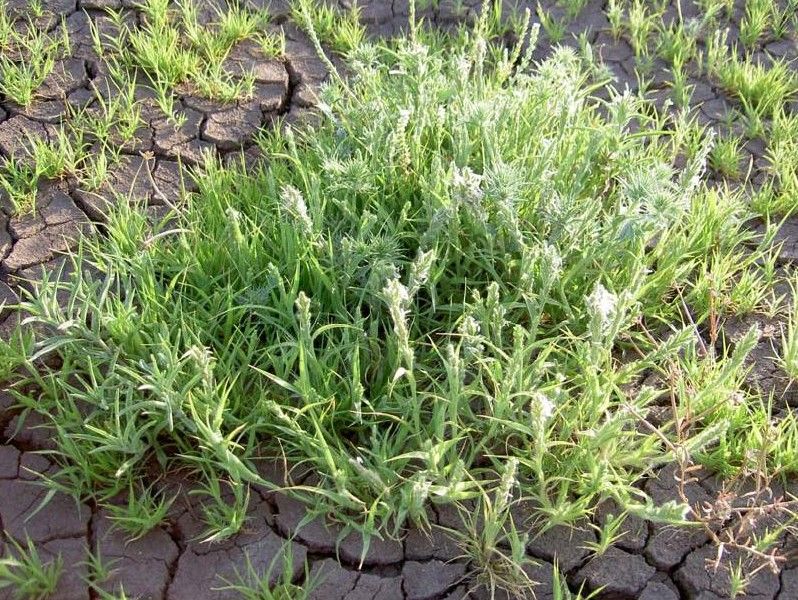

Conservation status
- Critically Imperiled (NatureServe)

Scientific classification
- Kingdom: Plantae
- Clade: Tracheophytes
- Clade: Angiosperms
- Clade: Monocots
- Clade: Commelinids
- Order: Poales
- Family: Poaceae
- Subfamily: Chloridoideae
- Genus: Tuctoria
- Species: T. greenei

Binomial name
- Tuctoria greenei (Vasey) Reeder

Synonyms
- Orcuttia greenei

= Tuctoria greenei =

Species of flowering plant

Tuctoria greenei is a species of grass endemic to California. Its common names include awnless spiralgrass and Greene's tuctoria. It is included by the California Native Plant Society on list 1B.1 (rare, threatened, or endangered). It is also listed by the state of California as rare and by the Federal Government as endangered, having been federally listed on March 26, 1997.

This grass typically occurs in vernal pools in open grassland on the eastern side of the Sacramento and San Joaquin Valleys. This endangered species is threatened by the destruction of its already rare vernal pool habitat. Processes causing this habitat destruction include agriculture, urban development, overgrazing and trampling by livestock, alterations in hydrology, and introduced species.
