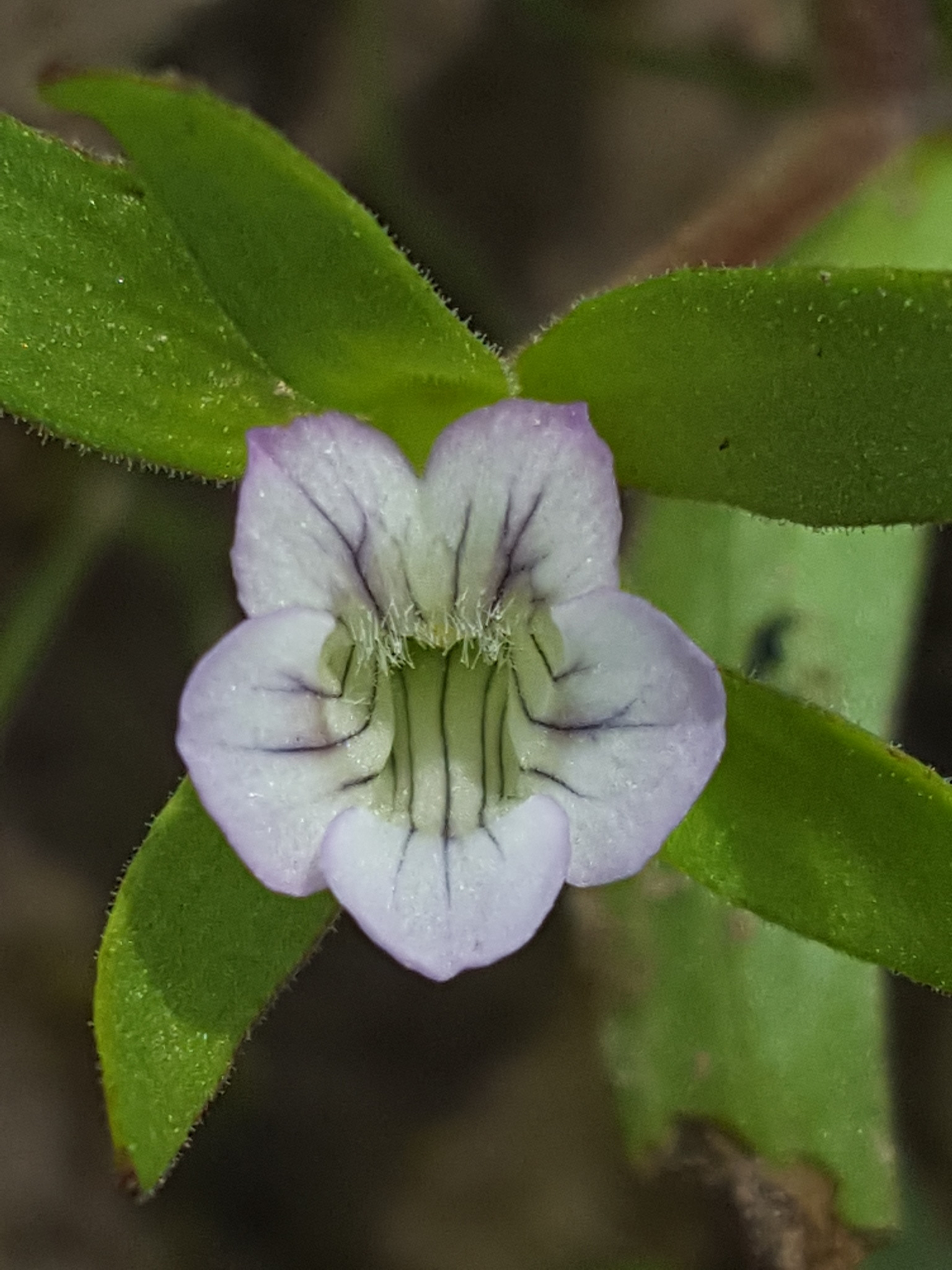

Conservation status
- Apparently Secure (NatureServe)

Scientific classification
- Kingdom: Plantae
- Clade: Tracheophytes
- Clade: Angiosperms
- Clade: Eudicots
- Clade: Asterids
- Order: Lamiales
- Family: Plantaginaceae
- Genus: Gratiola
- Species: G. ebracteata

Binomial name
- Gratiola ebracteata Benth.

= Gratiola ebracteata =

Species of flowering plant

Gratiola ebracteata is a species of flowering plant known by the common name bractless hedgehyssop. It is native to western North America from British Columbia to Montana to California. It grows in mud. This is a small, hairless, glandular annual plant rarely exceeding 10 centimeters (3.9 in) in height. It grows from the mud of wet habitats, producing an erect stem in shades of reddish green. There are a few small red-bordered green leaves along the stem. The inflorescence is an extension of the stem a few millimeters long and coated in hairlike glands. The centimeter-long flower is a sort of rectangular tube which is yellowish or off-white. The fruit is a spherical capsule a few millimeters wide.
