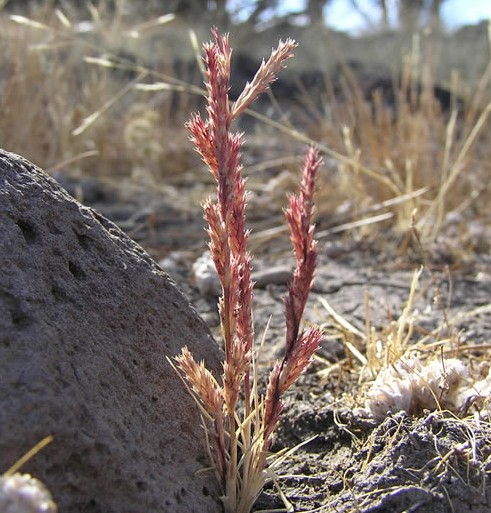
- Orcuttia tenuis

Scientific classification
- Kingdom: Plantae
- Clade: Tracheophytes
- Clade: Angiosperms
- Clade: Monocots
- Clade: Commelinids
- Order: Poales
- Family: Poaceae
- Subfamily: Chloridoideae
- Tribe: Cynodonteae
- Subtribe: Orcuttiinae
- Genus: Orcuttia; Vasey

Type species
- Orcuttia californica Vasey

Species
- See text

= Orcuttia =

Genus of grasses

Orcuttia is a genus of grass in the family Poaceae. Plants grow up to 20 cm (8 in) tall, usually with many stems emerging from the base of the plant, and forming a tuft. The spikelets (groups of flowers) are several-flowered, with reduced upper florets. The lemma tips have between two and five teeth.

Described in 1886, the genus contains five species native to California and Baja California. All plants are associated with vernal pools. Plants sprout when the pools are full but grow and flower after the pool bed has dried. These annual grasses, known generally as Orcutt grass, are all rare and federally protected in the United States.

== Taxonomy ==
Orcuttia was circumscribed by George Vasey in 1886, based on a collection of O. californica made by Californian botanist Charles Russell Orcutt, for whom the genus is named. The type locality was near San Quintin Bay in Baja California. O. californica was not collected again until 1922. Orcuttia greenei was described by Vasey in 1891 from collections near Chico, Butte county, but it was later transferred to Tuctoria (an anagram of Orcuttia). Hoover surveyed the genus in 1941. Orcuttia is the type genus of the tribe Orcuttieae, which also includes Tuctoria and the monotypic genus Neostapfia.

== Description ==
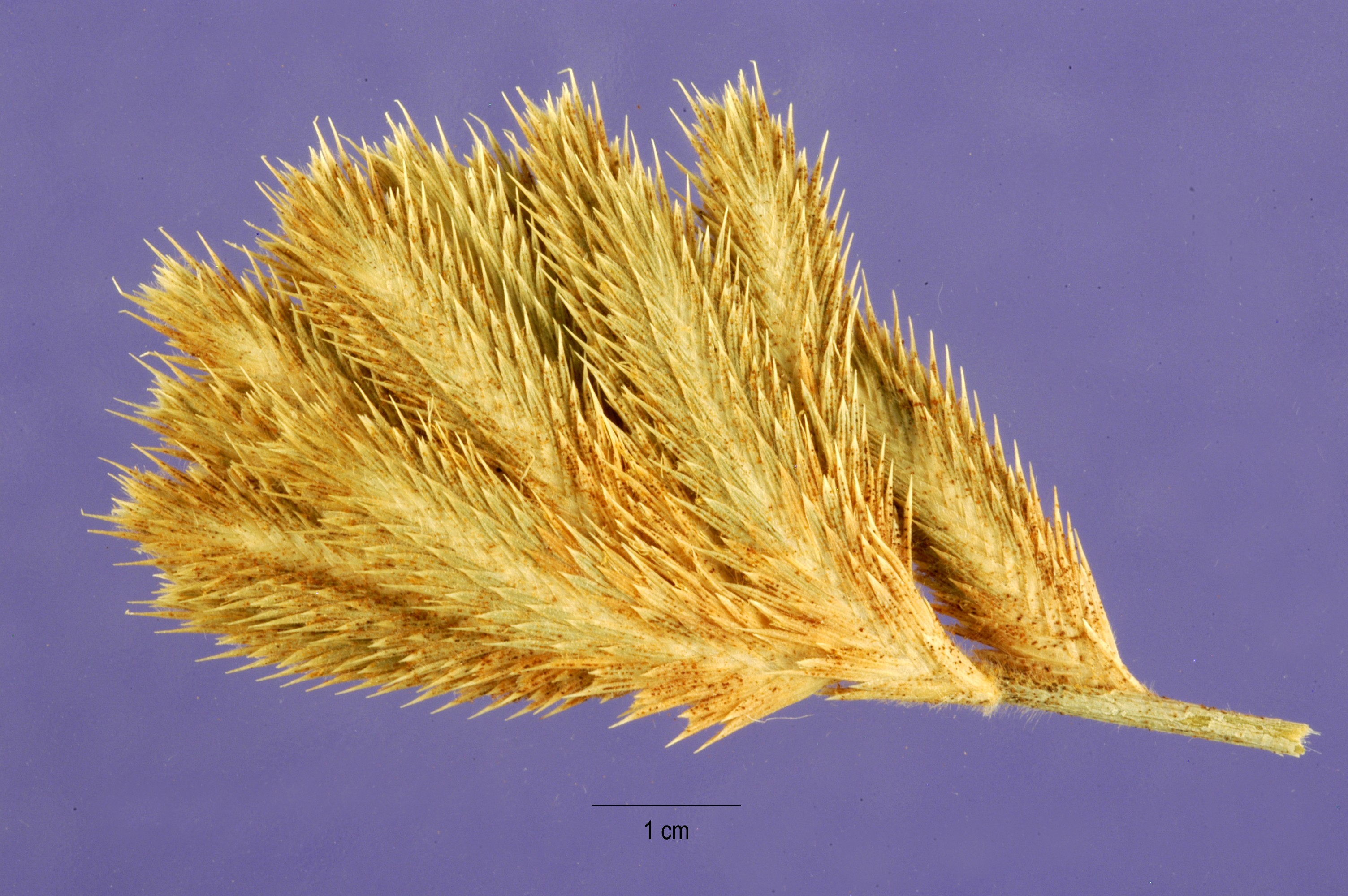
Orcuttia californica spikelet

Orcuttia species are annual plants with fibrous roots, and, in maturity, they produce leaves that are sticky and aromatic (similar to lemon). The odour may deter predation by insects and rodents, and the sticky coating may reduce desiccation. Elongated juvenile leaves are produced before the culm (stems). The culms have a pithy interior, and stand erect to ascending (rising upwards) to decumbent (lying along the ground with the tip ascending), and occasionally become prostrate (lying trailing along the ground). The leaves feature little or no differentiation into sheath and blade; as the grass dries, the blade portion either remains flat or rolls inward. The plants grow in tufts, with culms reaching a height of up to 20 cm (7.9 in), in the case of O. pilosa.

The inflorescence is spike-like, exserted (projecting beyond) at maturity, and the spikelets are distichous, meaning they are arranged in two opposite rows. The spikelets comprise several flowers and are laterally flattened, with glumes that have between 2 and 5 irregular teeth. There are 4–40 florets, which break above the glumes, and, in maturity, between the florets. The lemmas are prominently 5-nerved (referring to a strand of vascular and supporting tissue in a leaf or similar structure); these end in prominent teeth that are 1/3 to 1/2 or more the length of the lemma. Each individual tooth is flanked on either side of the strong central nerve by an additional weaker nerve, which extends about halfway to the base of the lemma. The palea (scales) are well-developed, and have 2 nerves; there are no lodicules. There are three white or pinkish anthers, which are borne on long, slender, ribbon-like filaments at anthesis. The pistil has two elongate filament-like styles that originate from the apex of the ovary; these are stigma-like for 1/3 to 1/2 of their length, and the stigmatic hairs are short and sparse. The caryopsis (a dry one-seeded fruit in which the ovary wall is united with the seed coat) is oblong to elliptical, and slightly flattened.

== Species ==
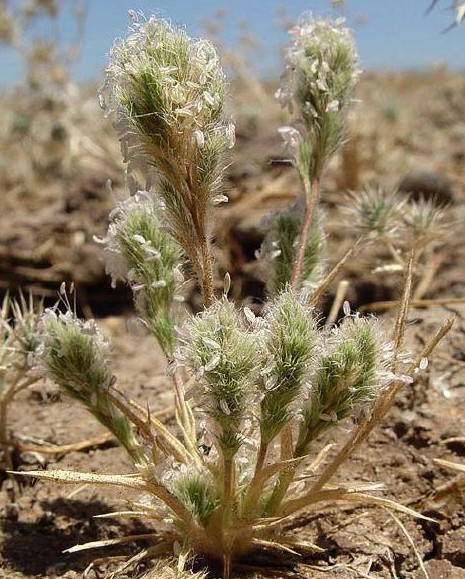
Orcuttia viscida

- Orcuttia californica - California Orcutt grass (endangered).
- Orcuttia inaequalis - San Joaquin Valley Orcutt grass (threatened)
- Orcuttia pilosa - hairy Orcutt grass (endangered)
- Orcuttia tenuis - slender Orcutt grass (threatened)
- Orcuttia viscida - Sacramento Orcutt grass (endangered)

== Ecology and distribution ==
All species of Orcuttia are associated with vernal pools, typically those ranging from 20–100 m (66–328 ft) or more in length or diameter. Before germination, seeds must be immersed in the pool mud for several months. Seedlings start as aquatic plants, first developing floating leaves, and then growing taller as the water level drops. Flowering begins within days after the water has dried out. Their seeds remain viable for several years, germinating only after their habitats have been flooded. A particular pool may have no Orcuttia plants for several dry years, but after heavy winter rains a large population may develop as the habitat dries during the spring and summer. Recreational misuse, urban development, and extensive development of irrigated agriculture has destroyed many of the specialised habitats for Orcuttia species, and they are federally and state-listed species of concern.
