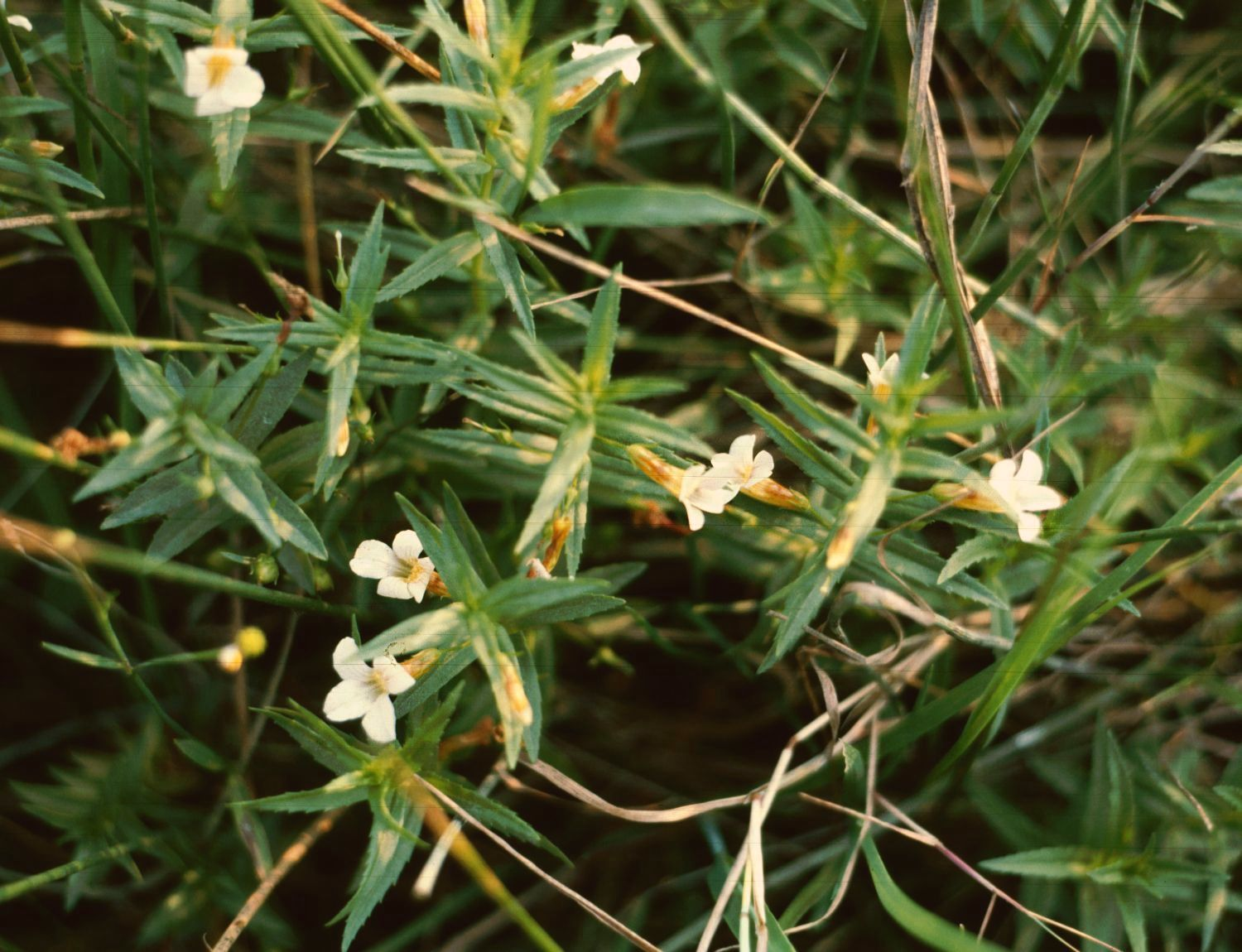
- Gratiola officinalis

Scientific classification
- Kingdom: Plantae
- Clade: Tracheophytes
- Clade: Angiosperms
- Clade: Eudicots
- Clade: Asterids
- Order: Lamiales
- Family: Plantaginaceae
- Tribe: Gratioleae
- Genus: Gratiola; L.

Species
- 29, see text

Synonyms
- Amphianthus Torr. (1837); Derlinia Néraud (1826); Gonatia Nutt. ex DC. (1846); Nibora Raf. (1817); Sophronanthe Benth. (1836); Tragiola Small & Pennell (1933)

= Gratiola =

Genus of flowering plants

Gratiola is a genus of plants in the family Plantaginaceae. Most species are known generally as hedgehyssops. It includes 29 species native to temperate North America and Eurasia, and to Morocco, South America, Australia, and New Zealand. The genus was previously included in the family Scrophulariaceae.

== Species ==
29 species are accepted.

- Gratiola amphiantha D.Estes & R.L.Small – pool sprite, snorkelwort (southeastern United States)
- Gratiola bogotensis Cortés ex Pennell – (Colombia, Ecuador, and norhwestern Venezuela)
- Gratiola brevifolia Raf. – sticky hedgehyssop (southeastern United States and Texas)
- Gratiola ebracteata Benth. ex A.DC. – bractless hedgehyssop (western Canada and western United States)
- Gratiola floridana Nutt. – Florida hedgehyssop (southeastern United States)
- Gratiola fluviatilis Koidz. – (Japan)
- Gratiola graniticola D.Estes – (Georgia and South Carolina)
- Gratiola griffithii Hook.f. – (Assam and Guangdong)
- Gratiola heterosepala H.Mason & Bacigal. – Boggs Lake hedgehyssop (California and Oregon)
- Gratiola hispida (Benth.) Pollard – pineland hedge-hyssop (southeastern United States)
- Gratiola japonica Miq. – (southern China, Korea, Japan, and Russian Far East)
- Gratiola linifolia Vahl – (Portugal and southwestern Spain)
- Gratiola lutea Raf. – golden hedgehyssop (southeastern Canada and north-central and eastern United States)
- Gratiola mauretanica (Emb. & Maire) I.Soriano & T.Romero – (Morocco)
- Gratiola nana Benth. – (southeastern Australia and New Zealand)
- Gratiola neglecta Torr. – clammy hedgehyssop (Canada and United States)
- Gratiola officinalis L. – common hedgehyssop (Europe, Morocco, Turkey, Caucasus, Iran, Pakistan, and Central Asia)
- Gratiola oresbia B.L.Rob. – (Mexico and Guatemala)
- Gratiola pedunculata R.Br. – (southern and eastern Australia)
- Gratiola peruviana L. – Austral brooklime (South America and southern and eastern Australia)
- Gratiola pilosa Michx. – shaggy hedge-hyssop (south-central and southeastern United States)
- Gratiola pubescens R.Br. – Hairy brooklime (southeastern Australia)
- Gratiola pumilo F.Muell. – (southern and eastern Australia)
- Gratiola quartermaniae D.Estes – limestone hedgehyssop (southern Ontario, east-central United States, and Texas)
- Gratiola ramosa Walter – branched hedgehyssop (southeastern United States)
- Gratiola sexdentata A.Cunn. – (New Zealand)
- Gratiola torreyi Small – yellow hedgehyssop (Louisiana and Texas)
- Gratiola virginiana L. – roundfruit hedgehyssop (Central and eastern United States)
- Gratiola viscidula Pennell – Short's hedgehyssop (east-central and southeastern United States)

== Fossil record ==
Four fossil seeds of †Gratiola tertiaria have been extracted from borehole samples of the Middle Miocene fresh water deposits in Nowy Sacz Basin, West Carpathians, Poland.
