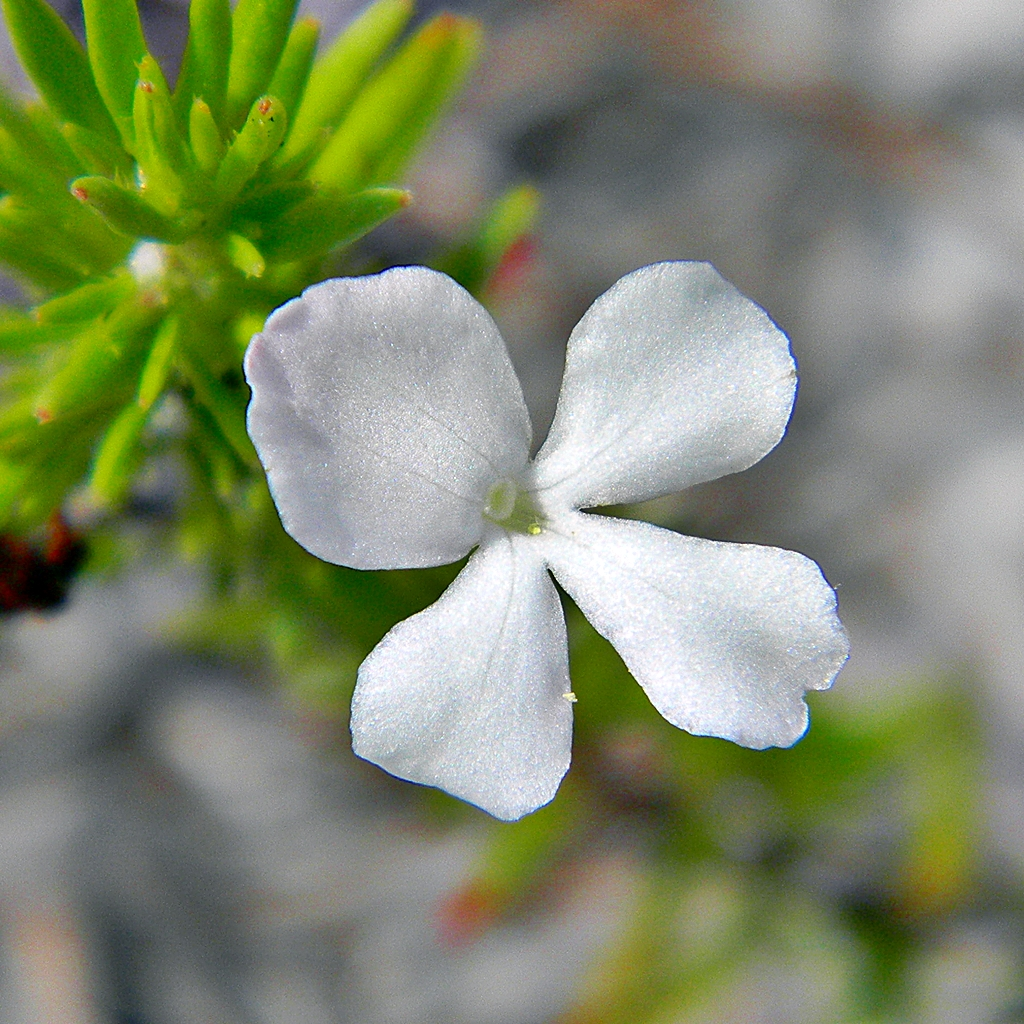
- Flower
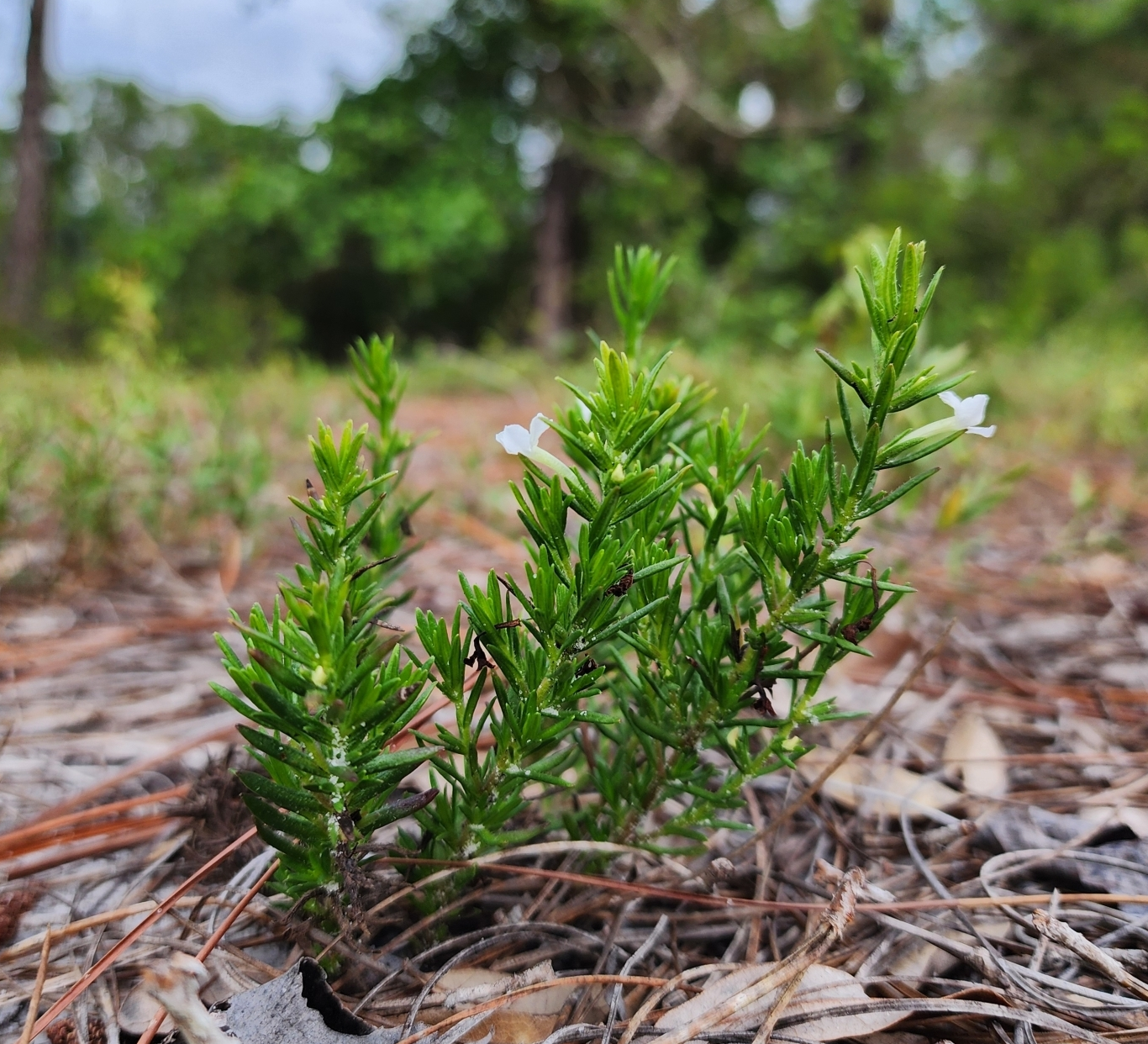
- Habit

Conservation status
- Apparently Secure (NatureServe)

Scientific classification
- Kingdom: Plantae
- Clade: Tracheophytes
- Clade: Angiosperms
- Clade: Eudicots
- Clade: Asterids
- Order: Lamiales
- Family: Plantaginaceae
- Genus: Gratiola
- Species: G. hispida

Binomial name
- Gratiola hispida Benth.

Synonyms
- Sophronanthe hispida Benth. (1836); Gratiola subulata Baldwin ex Benth. (1846)

= Gratiola hispida =

Species of flowering plant

Gratiola hispida is a small perennial flowering plant. Its common name is rough hedgehyssop. It has white flowers. Its stems are villous. It grows in the southeastern United States. It produces capsule fruit.

A 1921 publication states it grows in dry sands along the Gulf Coast. It has also been reported along the Atlantic coast of Florida and inland north of Jacksonville at the Okefenokee National Wildlife Refuge.

According to the Atlas of Florida Plants, the "species had been placed often in Gratiola, but recent work favors its segregation as part of a genus sister to the rest of Gratiola s.s. (Estes 2008; Estes & Small 2008)." Mostly endemic to Florida and southeast Georgia, it has also been identified in a few counties of Alabama and Louisiana.
