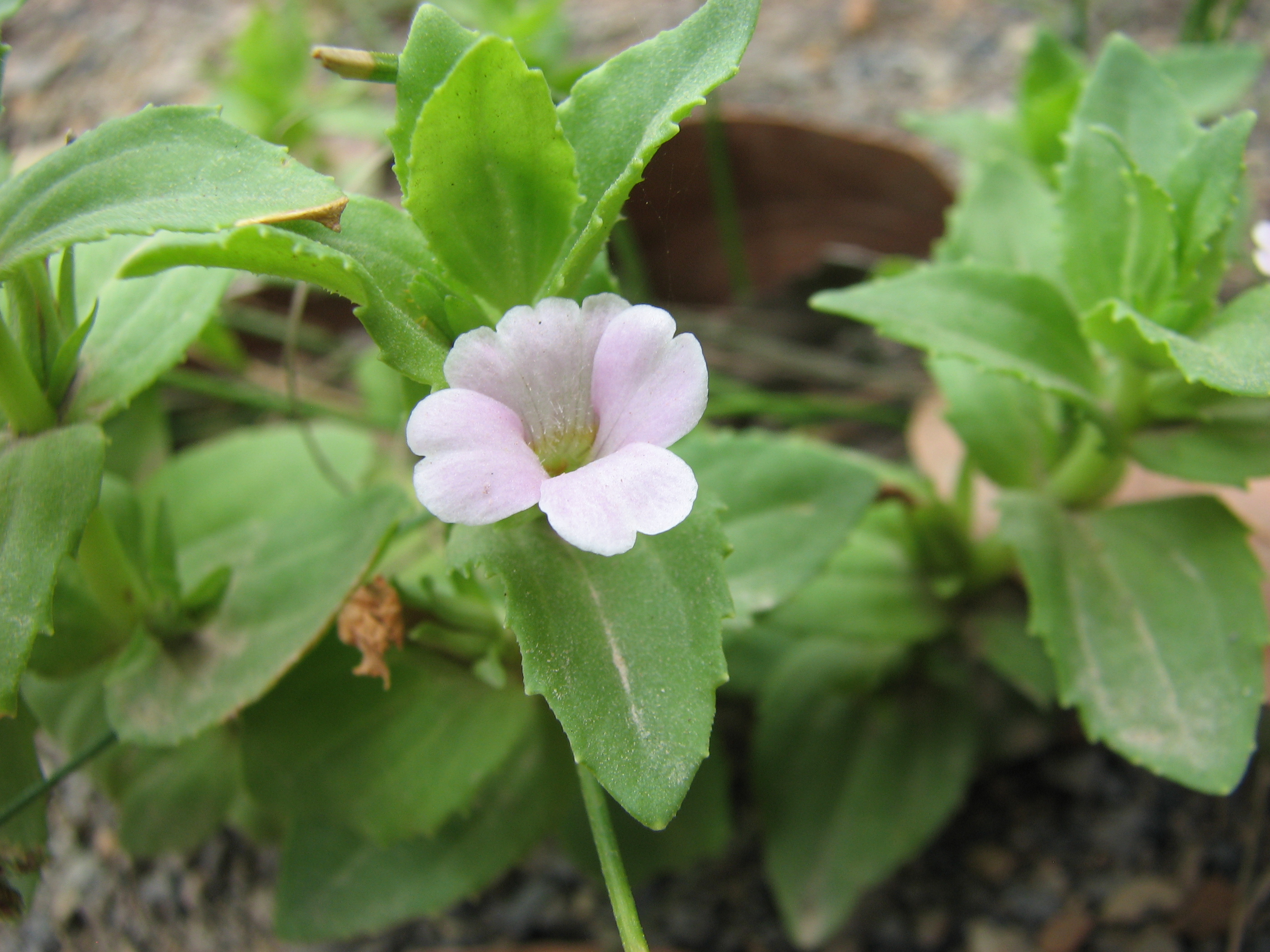
- Gratiola peruviana in Kinglake National Park, Australia

Scientific classification
- Kingdom: Plantae
- Clade: Tracheophytes
- Clade: Angiosperms
- Clade: Eudicots
- Clade: Asterids
- Order: Lamiales
- Family: Plantaginaceae
- Genus: Gratiola
- Species: G. peruviana

Binomial name
- Gratiola peruviana L.

Synonyms
- Gratiola latifolia R.Br.

= Gratiola peruviana =

Species of plant

Gratiola peruviana, commonly known as austral brooklime, is a small perennial herb in the family Plantaginaceae. The species is native to South America and Australasia. It grows to between 10 and 30 centimetres high and has pink or white tubular flowers with red-purple stripes inside. These are followed by ovoid capsules that are up to 7mm long. The stem-clasping ovate leaves are arranged in opposite pairs and have shallowly toothed edges.

It occurs in the vicinity of waterbodies in shallow water, mud or dried areas. In South America, the species is native to Peru, Brazil, Chile and Argentina. In Australasia, it occurs in New Zealand and the Australian states of South Australia, Tasmania, Victoria, New South Wales and Queensland. The name has been misapplied to Gratiola pubescens in Western Australia.
