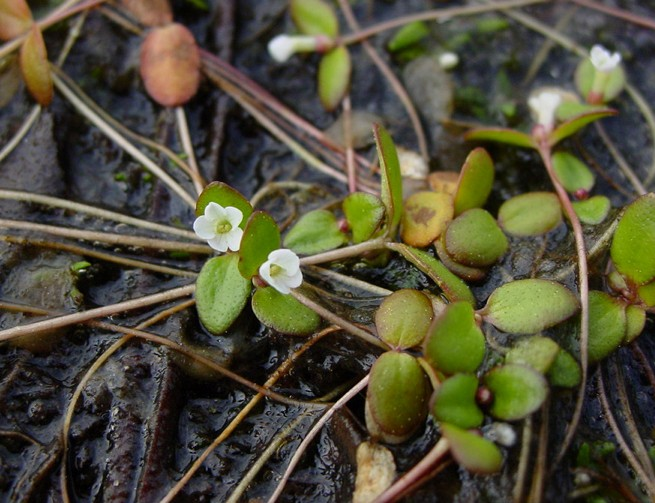

Conservation status
- Imperiled (NatureServe)

- Threatened (ESA)

Scientific classification
- Kingdom: Plantae
- Clade: Tracheophytes
- Clade: Angiosperms
- Clade: Eudicots
- Clade: Asterids
- Order: Lamiales
- Family: Plantaginaceae
- Genus: Gratiola
- Species: G. amphiantha

Binomial name
- Gratiola amphiantha D.Estes & R.L.Small 2008

Synonyms
- Amphianthus pusillus Torr.

= Gratiola amphiantha =

Species of flowering plant

Gratiola amphiantha is a rare species of flowering plant known by the common names little amphianthus, pool sprite and snorkelwort. It was previously the only species in the monotypic genus Amphianthus, but it was moved to genus Gratiola after genetic analysis in 2008. It is native to the Piedmont region of the southeastern United States, with a center of distribution in Georgia. It occurs in Alabama and South Carolina as well. It is limited to granite outcrops, a high-biodiversity habitat type that is threatened by activities such as quarrying, off-road vehicles, and trash and debris dumping. It is a federally listed threatened species.

== Description ==
Gratiola amphiantha is a petite aquatic plant which occurs in the non-Mediterranean climate vernal pools that sometimes form in the granite outcrop habitat. It is a delicate annual herb a few centimeters long with a short, threadlike stem surrounded by a rosette of tiny lance-shaped submerged leaves. Above them are a pair of slightly larger, floating leaves which are oval in shape and up to 8 millimeters (0.3 inches) long. Flowers occur in the axils of both submerged and floating leaves. Those occurring underwater are cleistogamous and do not open, and those blooming on the water's surface have open five-lobed white corollas a few millimeters long. It is a fast-growing species, germinating immediately with sufficient rain and maturing to flower in 17 days. Its life cycle is quick because appropriate growing conditions occur for only a brief time at these pools.

== Habitat ==
Gratiola amphiantha has a relatively specific habitat as it lives in vernal pools, or solution pools, on granite outcrops. These vernal pools consist of gravelly soils and are relatively shallow with flat bottoms that become submerged in water from winter to spring. There are few other plants that grow in the vernal pools of the outcrops, except for local endemic species of Isoetes, such as Isoetes piedmontana. These pools have to be submerged in water for several weeks and in the direct sun in order to support life for Gratiola amphiantha. Geographically, most Gratiola amphiantha grows in the state of Georgia, but it is also possible to find it in Alabama and South Carolina. Wherever Gratiola amphiantha grows, it is almost always found it large densities. Studies in regions of Alabama reveal densities as high as more than 32 plants per 10 square centimeters.

== Reproduction ==
Gratiola amphiantha, Pool Sprites, reproduce sexually and asexually. The reproduction process happens within the short 3-4 week life cycle of a Pool Sprite. During the sexual reproduction, white flowers bloom on the surface of the water to be pollinated eventually producing seeds that will germinate in wet and warm conditions. Mature Pool Sprites can also self pollinate in the closed flower buds located under the water, near the base of the stem. After pollinating, sexually or assexually, some of the 10-15 flowers produced will develop fruit that will dry and release seeds into the environment. These seeds will lay dormant until they germinate under the right conditions and repeat the life cycle of Gratiola amphiantha.

== Distribution ==
In the recent history of the Gratiola amphiantha, 76 populations have been documented. Fourteen of them possess uncertain states and twenty of them have been destroyed, while 42 have been determined extant. Populations are confined to three states of the Piedmont region of the southeast. It is distributed across five counties of east central Alabama, twenty counties in north central Georgia, and three counties in north central South Carolina. Thirteen populations reside on protected lands and two populations are outside of the historically known range. Due to the habit being extremely limited, there is a small margin of viable environments for the Gratiola amphiantha to grow and thrive. The population sizes of this species can vary greatly from year-to-year because they occur in large numbers and high densities.

== Conservation ==
Gratiola amphiantha populations have varied over the years. In Alabama, eight observed populations spread across several pools have experienced fluctuations, with two becoming dangerously close to local extinction. Threats to Gratiola amphiantha include dumping, the recreational use of sites, and the proximity of pools to quarries.

In response to a state and federal status as threatened, The Georgia State Wildlife Action Plan (SWAP) has executed 4 steps to address conservation issues: Restore or improve original habitat, maintain routine observation of the habitat or population, maintain relationships with landowners to support them financially or technically in maintaining property that contains threatened wildlife, and in time for the next Georgia SWAP revision, review the conservation status of the plant in the Species of Greatest Conservation Need (SGCN) database and update accordingly .

== Nomenclature ==
The Gratiola amphiantha began in a monotypic genus, Amphianthus with uncertainty around placement within a family. D. Estes and R.L. Small transferred the species to Gratiola amphiantha in 2008. Typically, when a species transfers genuses, the specific name of the epithet should be kept. In this case, the species would have become Gratiola pusilla, which is not a legitimate name because G. pusilla is a homonym of the G. pusilla Willd. and G. pusilla Torr. Therefore, the new name Gratiola amphiantha was proposed to replace Amphianthus pusillus.
