= Metabranchipus =

Scientific classification
- Domain: Eukaryota
- Kingdom: Animalia
- Phylum: Arthropoda
- Class: Branchiopoda
- Order: Anostraca
- Family: Branchipodidae
- Genus: Metabranchipus; Masi, 1925

Genus of fairy shrimps

Metabranchipus is a genus of fairy shrimps within the family Branchipodidae. There are currently three species assigned to the genus.

== Species ==
- Metabranchipus patrizii Masi, 1925
- Metabranchipus prodigiosus Rogers & Hamer, 2012
- Metabranchipus rubra Rogers & Hamer, 2012
