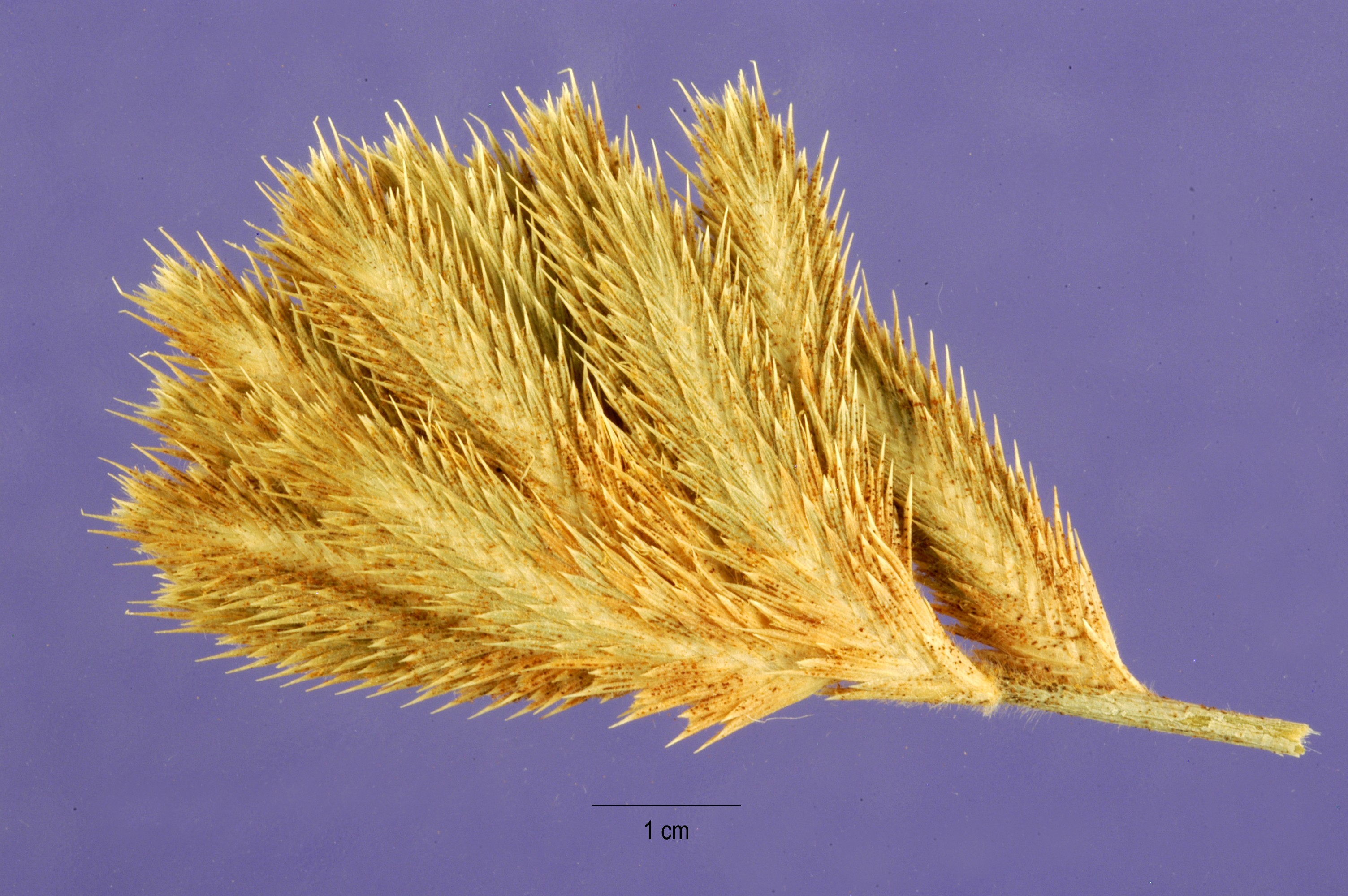

Conservation status
- Endangered (ESA)

Scientific classification
- Kingdom: Plantae
- Clade: Tracheophytes
- Clade: Angiosperms
- Clade: Monocots
- Clade: Commelinids
- Order: Poales
- Family: Poaceae
- Subfamily: Chloridoideae
- Genus: Orcuttia
- Species: O. californica

Binomial name
- Orcuttia californica Vasey

= Orcuttia californica =

Species of flowering plant

Orcuttia californica is a rare species of grass known by the common name California Orcutt grass.

== Distribution ==
It is native to southern California and northern Baja California, where it grows in scattered locations in vernal pool habitat. In 1993 it was known from fewer than 20 occurrences, including those at the Santa Rosa Plateau, a creek drainage near Hemet, Otay Mesa in San Diego County, and one spot in Woodland Hills.

Orcuttia californica is a federally listed endangered species, and its existence is still threatened by the disappearance of vernal pools in the region, a naturally rare habitat type that has been reduced further by urban development.

== Description ==
Orcuttia californica is a small, hairy annual grass with prostrate stems sometimes forming small tufts or mats, rarely exceeding 15 centimeters tall. It is bright green, aromatic, and glandular, secreting sticky, bitter-tasting exudate. The leaves are 1 or 2 centimeters long, the first set produced when the pool is wet, another set growing during the dry season. The inflorescence is up to 6 centimeters long with red-maroon to pink anthers extending out from the terminal spikelets.
