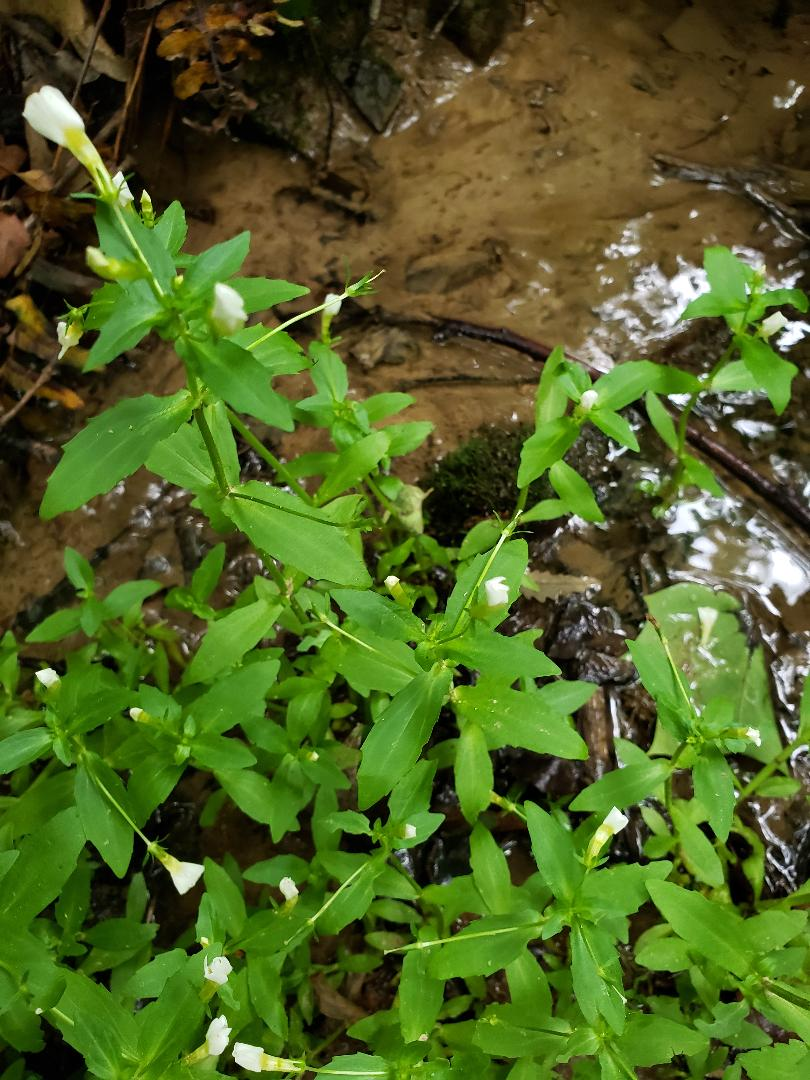

Conservation status
- Apparently Secure (NatureServe)

Scientific classification
- Kingdom: Plantae
- Clade: Tracheophytes
- Clade: Angiosperms
- Clade: Eudicots
- Clade: Asterids
- Order: Lamiales
- Family: Plantaginaceae
- Genus: Gratiola
- Species: G. floridana

Binomial name
- Gratiola floridana Nutt.

= Gratiola floridana =

Species of plant

Gratiola floridana, the Florida hedge hyssop, is a species of annual forb native to the southeast United States. It grows in wet areas.

It reaches between 0 and 1 foot in height, and possesses white to pink-colored flowers. G. floridana can be found along stream banks, in blackwater swamps, and in spring runs.

== Distribution ==
It is found in six states of the Southeast United States (Florida, Georgia, Louisiana, Mississippi, Alabama, and Tennessee) but is endangered or vulnerable in all but Florida and Alabama.
