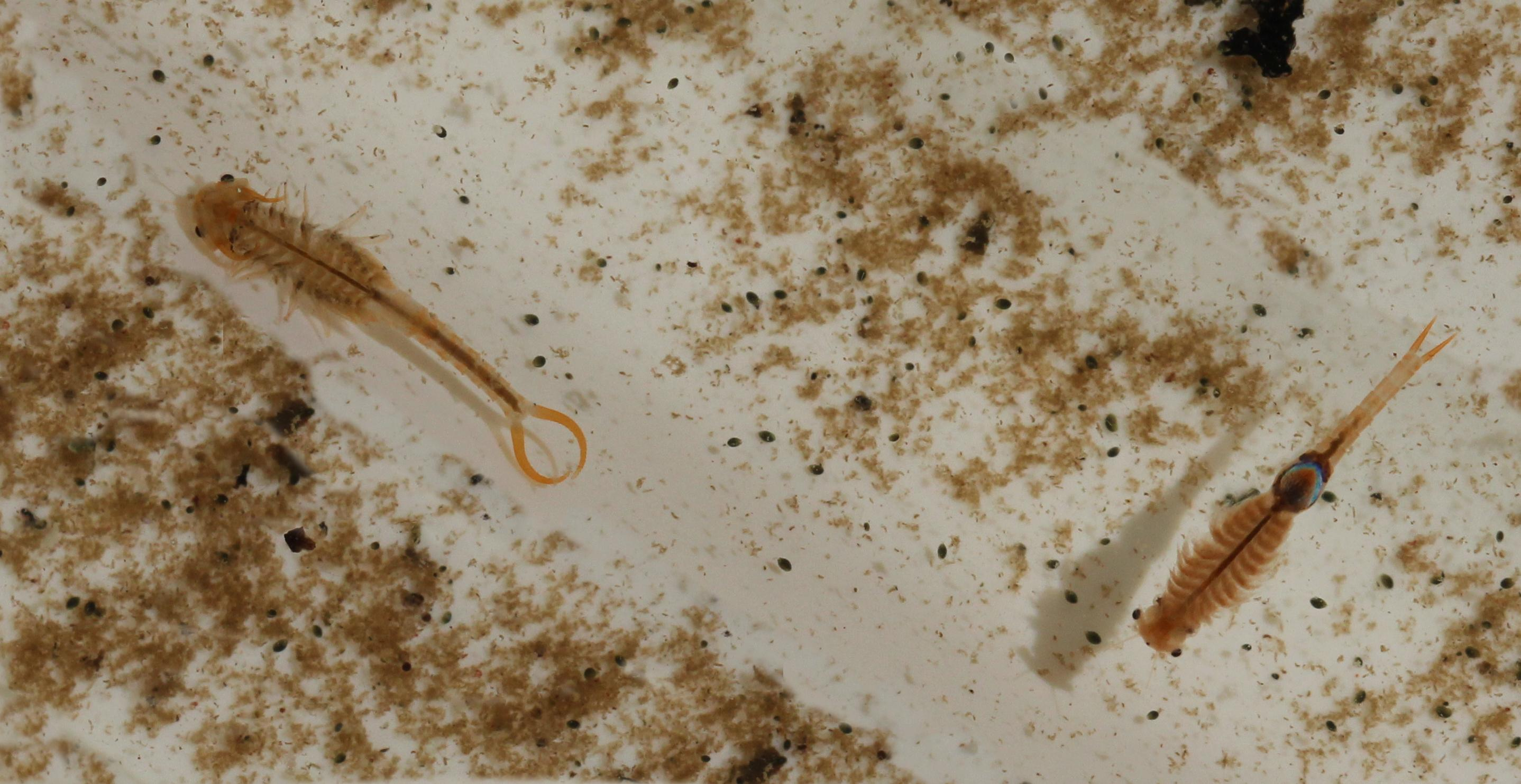
- Branchipodopsis sp., male and female, from the Western Cape, South Africa

Scientific classification
- Domain: Eukaryota
- Kingdom: Animalia
- Phylum: Arthropoda
- Class: Branchiopoda
- Order: Anostraca
- Suborder: Anostracina
- Family: Branchipodidae; H. Milne-Edwards, 1840

= Branchipodidae =

Branchipodidae Temporal range: Late Eocene-Holocene

Family of small freshwater animals

Branchipodidae is a family of fairy shrimp, one of eight in the order Anostraca. It contains 35 extant species in five extant genera:

- Branchipodopsis G. O. Sars, 1898
- Branchipus Schaeffer, 1766
- Metabranchipus Masi, 1925
- Pumilibranchipus Hamer & Brendonck, 1995
- Rhinobranchipus Brendonck, 1995

One species, Branchipodites vectensis Woodward, 1879, in an extinct genus, is known as a fossil from the Latest Eocene-aged Insect Bed of the Bembridge Marls, of the Isle of Wight.
