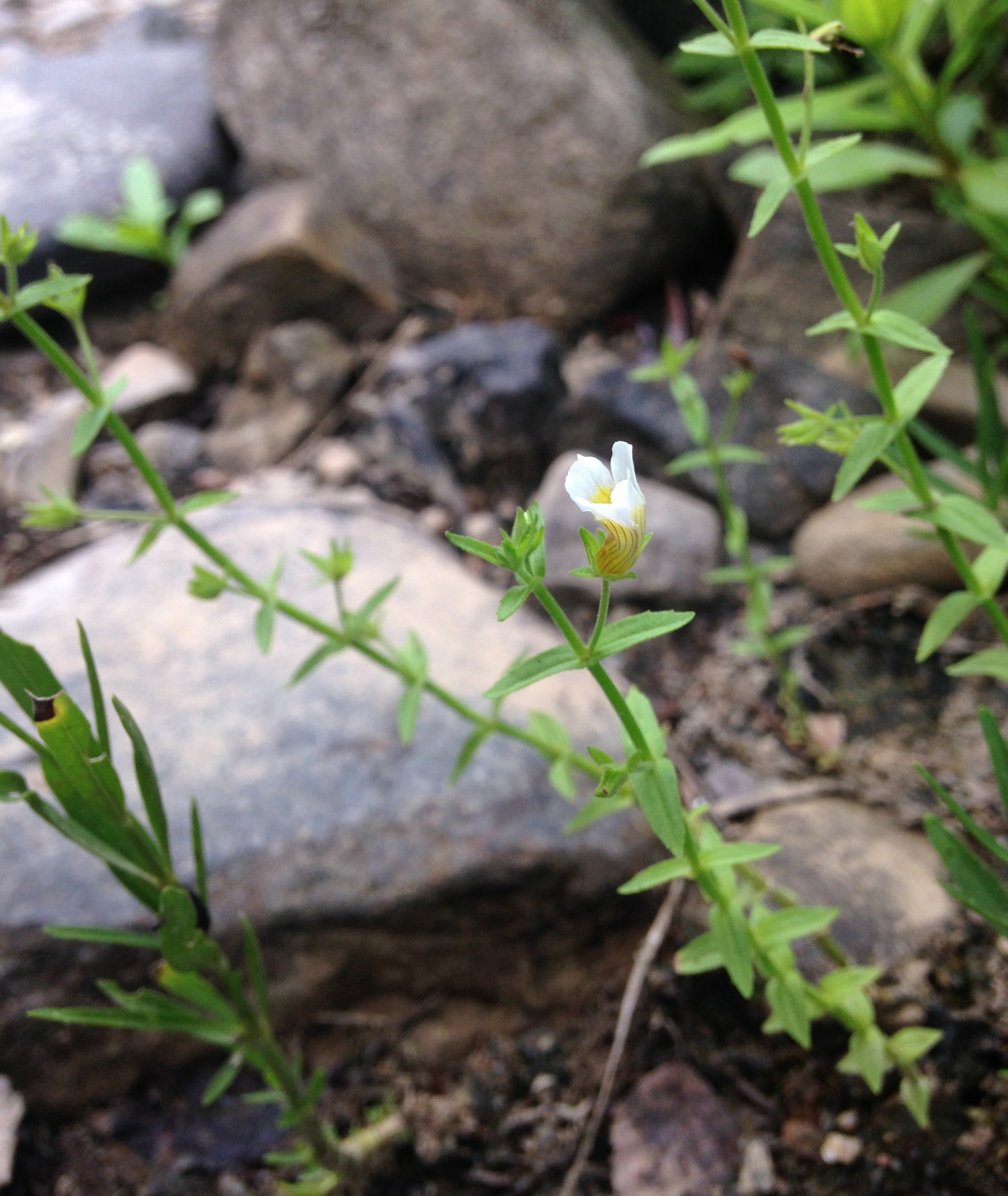

Scientific classification
- Kingdom: Plantae
- Clade: Tracheophytes
- Clade: Angiosperms
- Clade: Eudicots
- Clade: Asterids
- Order: Lamiales
- Family: Plantaginaceae
- Genus: Gratiola
- Species: G. brevifolia

Binomial name
- Gratiola brevifolia Raf.

= Gratiola brevifolia =

Species of flowering plant

Gratiola brevifolia, commonly called sticky hedgehyssop, is a species of flowering plant in the plantain family (Plantaginaceae). It is found in the Southeastern United States, where it has a scattered distribution. Its natural habitat is in wet acidic areas such as sandy riverbanks, sandy pinelands, and cypress swamps.

Gratiola brevifolia is a rhizomatous perennial. Its leaves are linear-lanceolate with a few coarse teeth distally. Its flowers have white lobes and a yellow tube with brown lines. It blooms from April to September.

Gratiola brevifolia is similar to Gratiola vicidula, which has a range centered farther to the east. G. brevifolia can be distinguished by its narrower leaves and sepals. It is also similar to Gratiola ramosa, a species that it co-occurs with on the Southeastern Coastal Plain, from which G. brevifolia can be distinguished by the regular presence of 1-2 bracts subtending the sepals.
