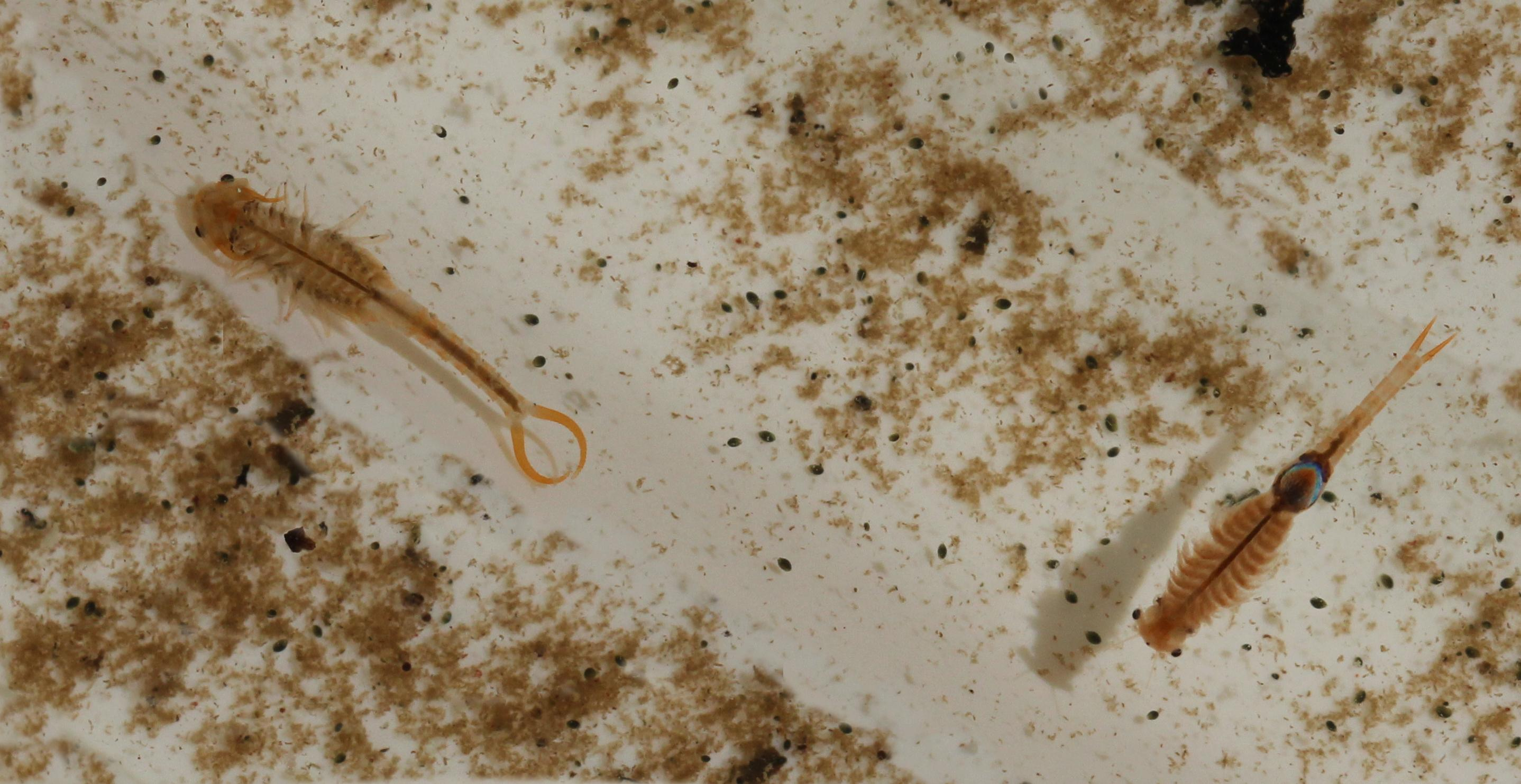
- Branchipodopsis sp., male and female, from the Western Cape, South Africa

Scientific classification
- Kingdom: Animalia
- Phylum: Arthropoda
- Class: Branchiopoda
- Order: Anostraca
- Family: Branchipodidae
- Genus: Branchipodopsis; G. O. Sars, 1898

Synonyms
- Branchipus abiadi Brauer, 1877; Eubranchinella Daday, 1910; Mongolobranchipus Dybowskyi, 1928

= Branchipodopsis =

Genus of small freshwater animals

Branchipodopsis is a genus of aquatic crustaceans, in the order Anostraca. It is one of several genera known as fairy shrimp. All described species are specialised for inhabiting ephemeral rock pools in situations such as mountains and deserts. Though the genus is most widely known from Africa, some occur in the middle east and adjoining regions.

== Distribution ==
Species in the genus Branchipodopsis have been described mainly from the African mainland, in particular southern Africa, and among anostracan taxa the genus is among the most speciose in the sub-continent. Some species however have been reported from elsewhere, such as Branchipodopsis buettikeri, found in temporary desert ponds in the Sultanate of Oman, the first species found in the Arabian peninsula. The recently described species, Branchipodopsis relictus on the main island of the Socotra archipelago, which is exceedingly remote for what it is, a continental fragment of Gondwana, isolated since the Miocene. Branchipodopsis relictus is correspondingly isolated genetically as well as geographically.

== Ecology ==
All the species in this genus inhabit small, transient rock pools, mainly pools containing clear rain water after heavy, seasonal rainfall. Like most inhabitants of vernal pools Branchipodopsis are adapted to the associated unpredictability and drastically changing conditions peculiar to such environments. Rock pools of this nature occur in various regions of the Southern African subcontinent, including mountain ranges in the Drakensberg, the Western Cape and the Eastern Free State. They also occur in arid regions such as South-Eastern Botswana.

The rock pools that Branchipodopsis species inhabit are notable for the water's clarity and its very low electrolytic conductivity (generally below 50μS per centimetre, commonly less than 10μS per cm). Such poor conductivity reflects a very low content of soluble salts, acids or bases, in strong contrast to the conditions preferred by the related family Artemiidae, the brine shrimps. It also implies a very low content of soluble mineral materials, including mineral nutrients, from the surrounding rock.

The pools also are shallow, less than 50 cm (20 in) deep, as a rule. Their low mineral content sharply limits their buffering capacity and one result is that they are subject to major shifts in pH; a range between pH 4 and pH 11 is nothing unusual in some regions. Such variations are subject to the time of day and the water cycle variables. Water temperature in such shallow, exposed pools also varies dramatically according to evaporation, ambient air temperature and solar heating, as affected by the colour of the surrounding rock. Daily fluctuations between 10 °C and 40 °C are common.

Small mountain rock pools usually do not stay full for long; in semi-arid areas there may be several cycles of filling and drying out during a single rainy season, depending on local weather. Any organisms attempting to complete their life cycle in such pools do so without any latitude; if they are late they die without issue. Branchipodopsis species excel in this respect and usually mature within a week or so after the formation of the pool. A typical clutch of dormant eggs generally numbers less than 100, but a mature female produces a new clutch nearly every day.

== Reproduction ==
Especially in arid regions like South-Eastern Botswana, rainfall may be so erratic that sometimes there is not enough time for growth and reproduction; about a third of the inundations in some regions end in the pools drying too soon, causing the entire hatched population to die. Species subject to such circumstances depend on the strategy of producing a large bank of dormant eggs in the detritus of the pool bed, most of those hatching only after an unpredictable number of cycles of inundation, some of them only after many years. This partial hatching (or germination) is a common strategy in both animals and plants dependent subject to ruderal conditions. In the case of fairy shrimps such as Branchipodopsis and of other organisms dependent on, in fact specialised for, such fugitive conditions, it entails inability to survive in superficially more attractive, permanent conditions, such as perennial water; the eggs require periodic desiccation for their hatching stimulus and the adults cannot compete effectively with organisms that can exploit more nutrient-rich water.

Dispersal of eggs over short distances may happen under many circumstances, for example by overflow from pools. However, long-range dispersal is comparatively rare and usually happens only in shallow pools without much vegetation. When dispersal takes place over longer distances, the vectors commonly would be favourable wind or the feet of birds, both of which are episodic and unreliable vehicles. Such constraints on dispersal provide a plausible reason for the high proportion of endemic species throughout the region; in the Drakensberg alone there are four. It also could explain the morphological variability of some widespread species, for example Branchipodopsis wolfi in Botswana.

== Species ==
There are currently 22 species assigned to the genus.

- Branchipodopsis abiadi (Brauer, 1877)
- Branchipodopsis affinis Sars, 1901
- Branchipodopsis barnardi Hamer & Appleton, 1996
- Branchipodopsis browni Barnard, 1929
- Branchipodopsis buettikeri Thiéry & Jean, 2004
- Branchipodopsis candea Löffler, 1968
- Branchipodopsis dayae Hamer & Appleton, 1996
- Branchipodopsis drakensbergensis Hamer & Appleton, 1996
- Branchipodopsis drepanae Barnard, 1929
- Branchipodopsis odgsoni Sars, 1898
- Branchipodopsis hutchinsoni Hamer & Appleton, 1996
- Branchipodopsis kalaharensis Daday, 1910
- Branchipodopsis kaokoensis Barnard, 1929
- Branchipodopsis karroensis Barnard, 1929
- Branchipodopsis natalensis Barnard, 1929
- Branchipodopsis relictus Van Damme, Dumont & Weekers, 2004
- Branchipodopsis scambus Barnard, 1929
- Branchipodopsis simplex Barnard, 1929
- Branchipodopsis transversus Rogers & Meyer-Milne, 2021
- Branchipodopsis tridens Daday, 1910
- Branchipodopsis underbergensis Hamer & Appleton, 1996
- Branchipodopsis wolfi Daday, 1910
