= Gratiola pilosa =

Scientific classification
- Kingdom: Plantae
- Clade: Embryophytes
- Clade: Tracheophytes
- Clade: Spermatophytes
- Clade: Angiosperms
- Clade: Eudicots
- Clade: Asterids
- Order: Lamiales
- Family: Plantaginaceae
- Genus: Gratiola
- Species: G. pilosa

Binomial name
- Gratiola pilosa (Michx.) Small

Species of plant

Gratiola pilosa, commonly known as shaggy hedge-hyssop, is a perennial forb in the family Plantaginaceae native to the United States.

== Description ==
Gratiola pilosa is a stiff, erect, usually unbranched perennial herb, growing 10–70 cm tall, with pilose stems about 1–2 mm in diameter. The leaves are opposite, sessile, and ovate to ovate-lanceolate, measuring 1.2–2 cm long and 5–11 mm wide. They are entire or irregularly serrate, hairy, and often dotted with glandular punctations. Flowers are solitary in the axils of leafy bracts, typically with a pair of small bractlets just below the calyx. The flowers are sessile or nearly so, with pedicels less than 1 mm long. The sepals are linear to linear-lanceolate, 3–7 mm long, pubescent, and subequal, usually exceeded by linear bractlets. The corolla is small, 6–8 mm long, white or tinged with lavender. The upper two stamens are fertile, while the lower two are rudimentary or absent; anthers often have a transverse orientation and may be topped with a membranous connective. The fruit is a smooth, conical to globose capsule, 4–5 mm long.

== Distribution and habitat ==
It is found from New Jersey south to South Florida, west to East Texas, and northward in the interior to Kentucky, Tennessee, Arkansas, and eastern Oklahoma. It grows in wet pine savannas, marshes, and other wet areas.
