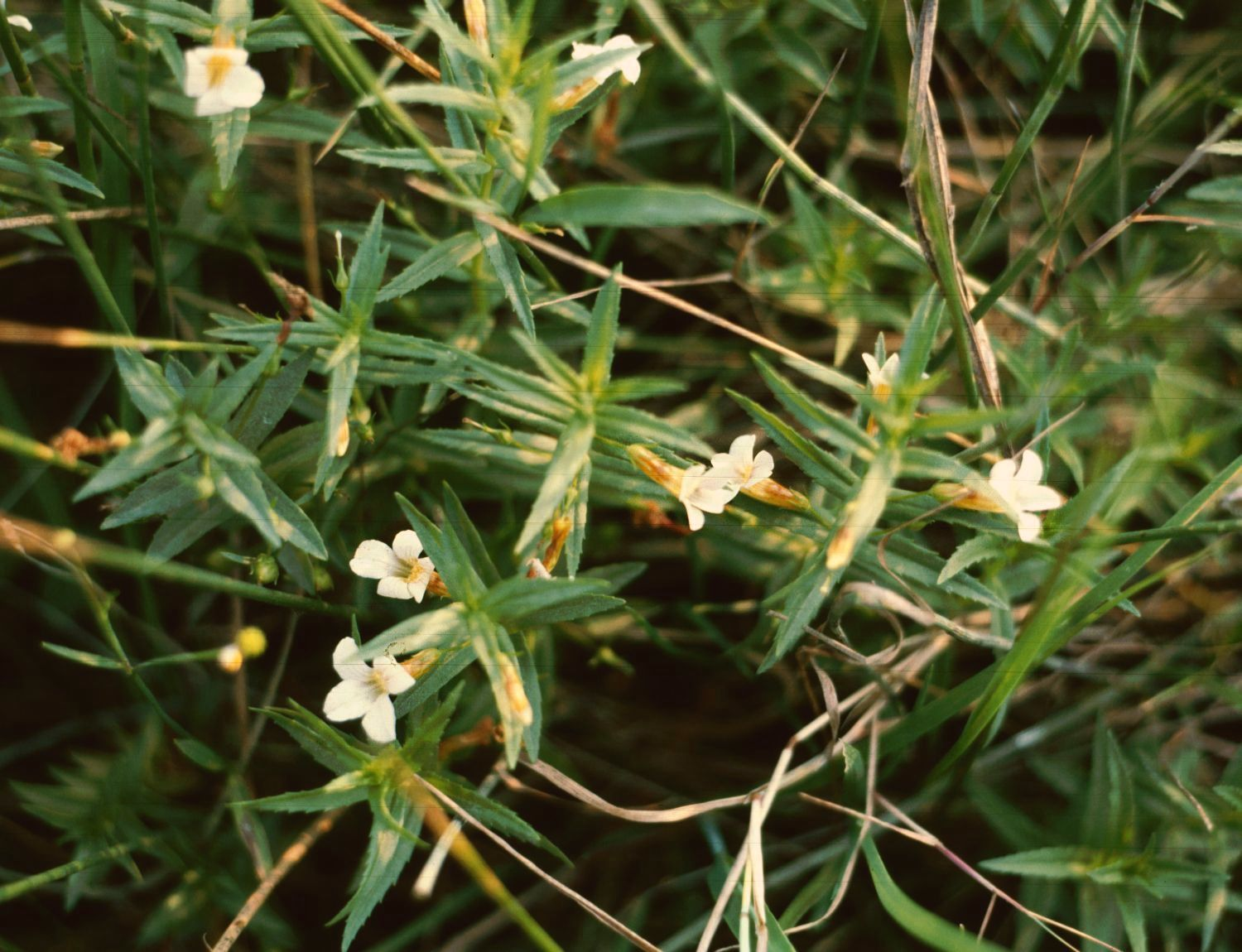

Conservation status
- Least Concern (IUCN 3.1)

Scientific classification
- Kingdom: Plantae
- Clade: Embryophytes
- Clade: Tracheophytes
- Clade: Spermatophytes
- Clade: Angiosperms
- Clade: Eudicots
- Clade: Asterids
- Order: Lamiales
- Family: Plantaginaceae
- Genus: Gratiola
- Species: G. officinalis

Binomial name
- Gratiola officinalis L.

= Gratiola officinalis =

Hedge hyssop

Species of flowering plant

Gratiola officinalis, the gratiole, common hedgehyssop, grace of God, Gratia Dei, hedge hyssop, hedge-hyssop, or herb of grace, is an ornamental plant in the family Plantaginaceae. It is a rhizomatous perennial herb native to Europe.

== Gallery ==
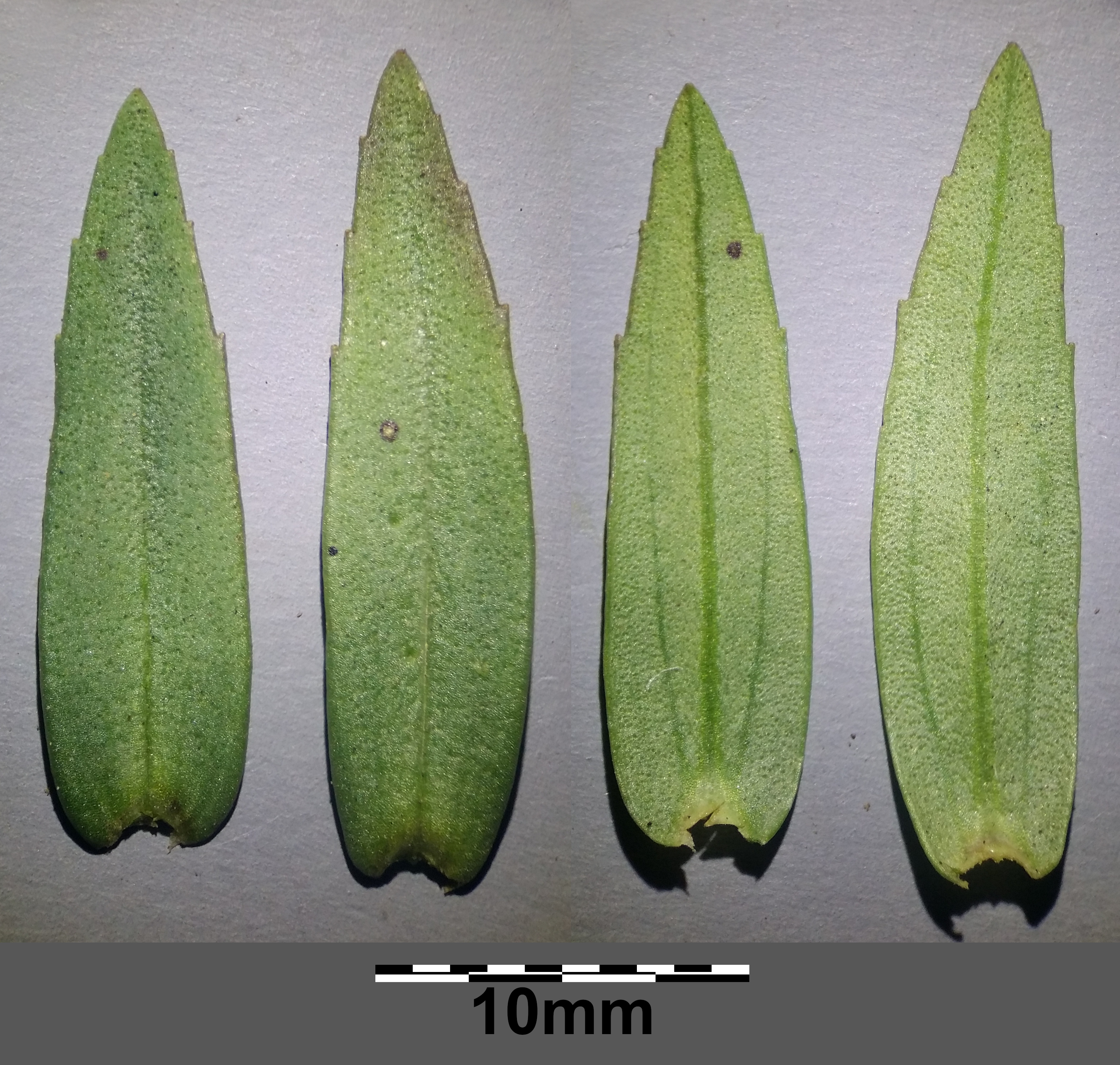
Leaves

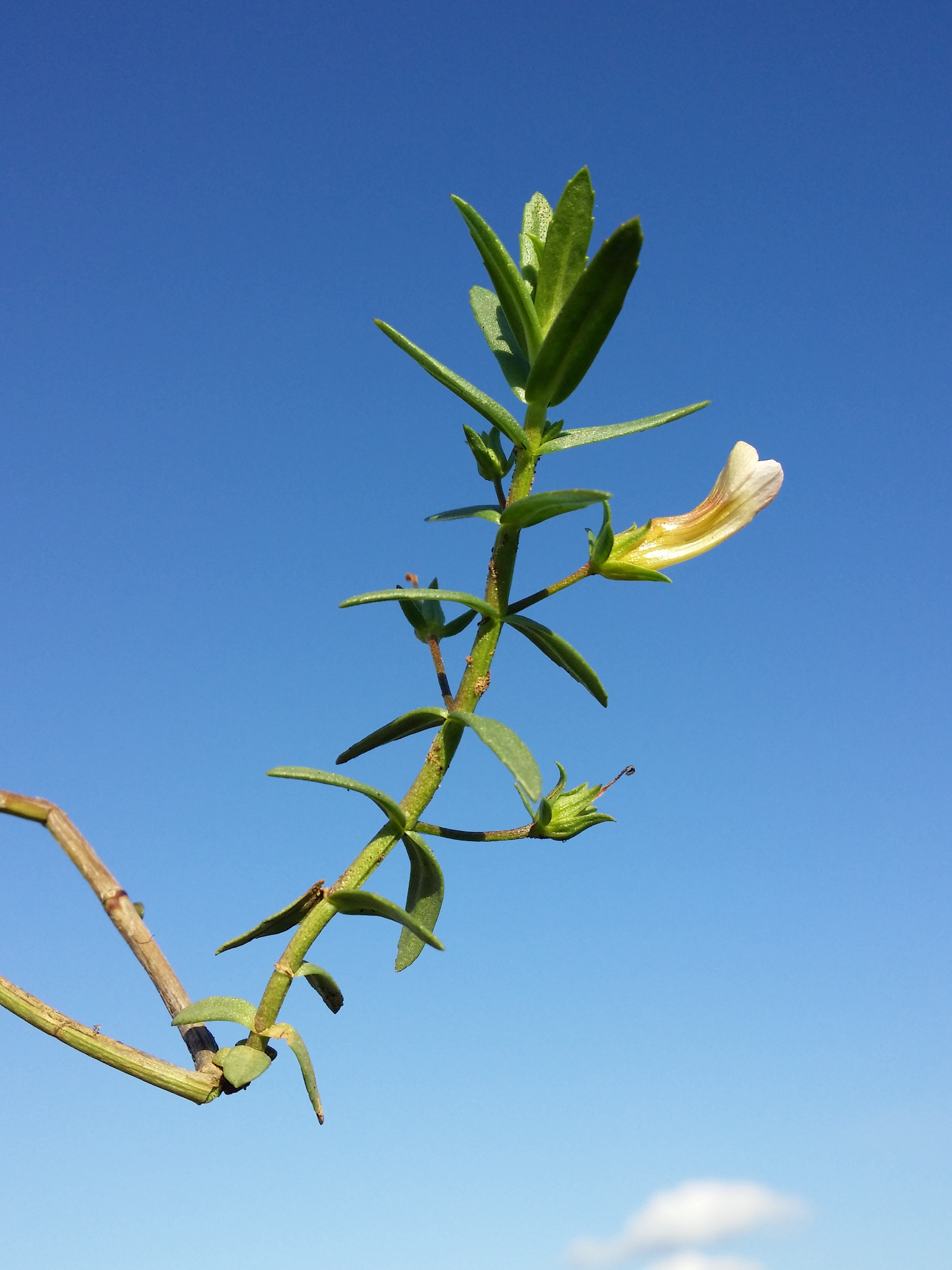
Flowering stem

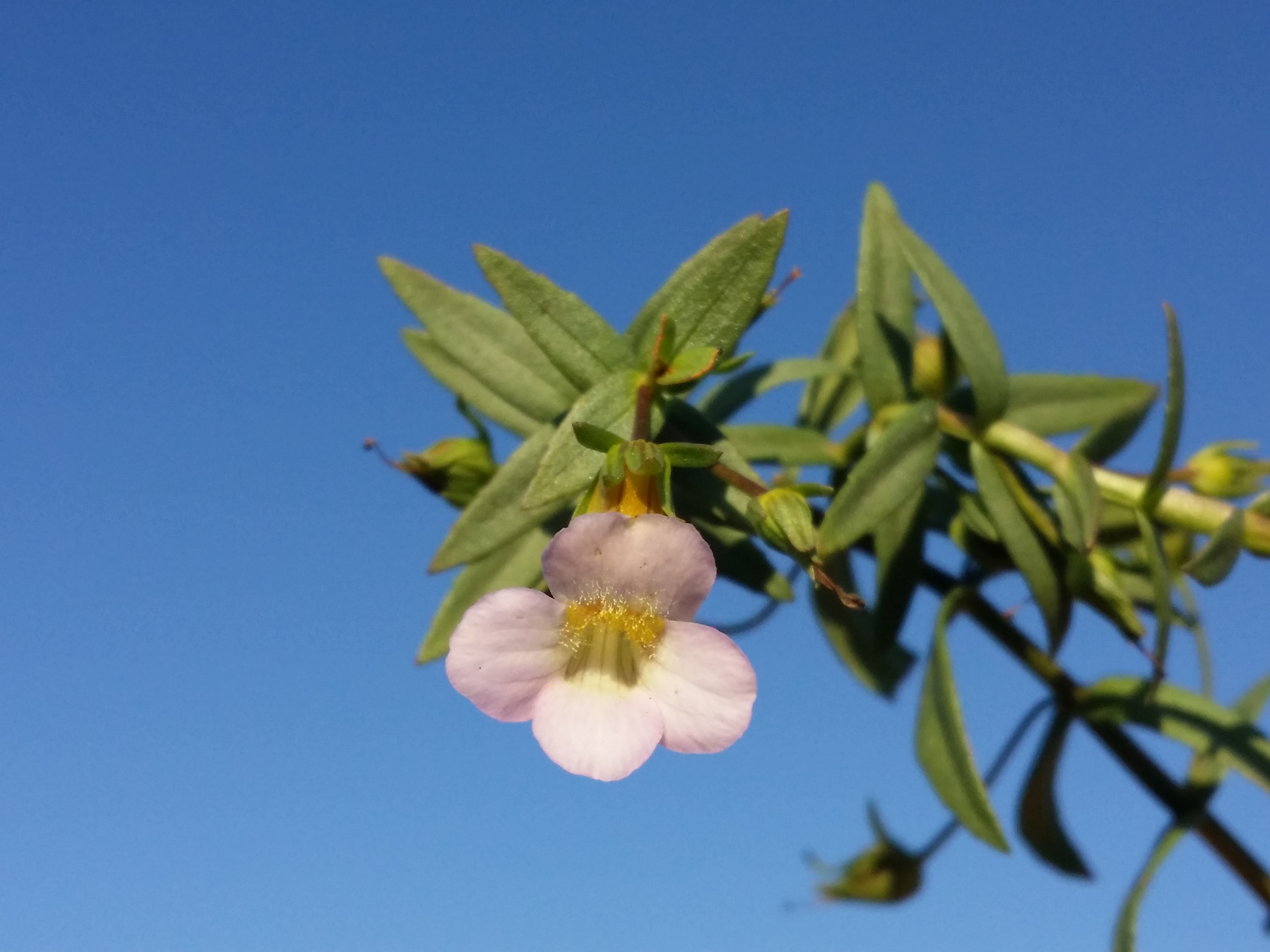
Flower

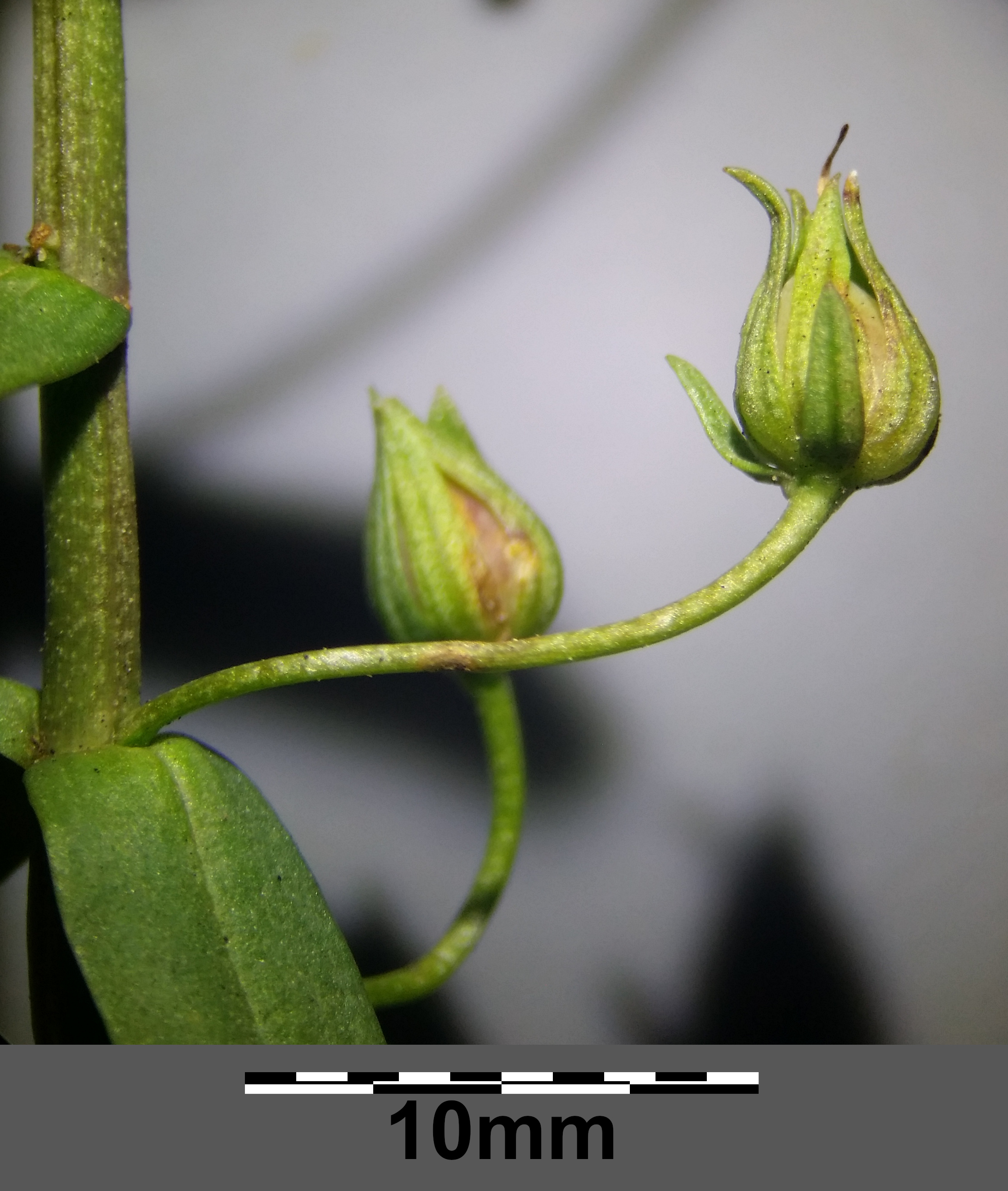
Fruit stalks

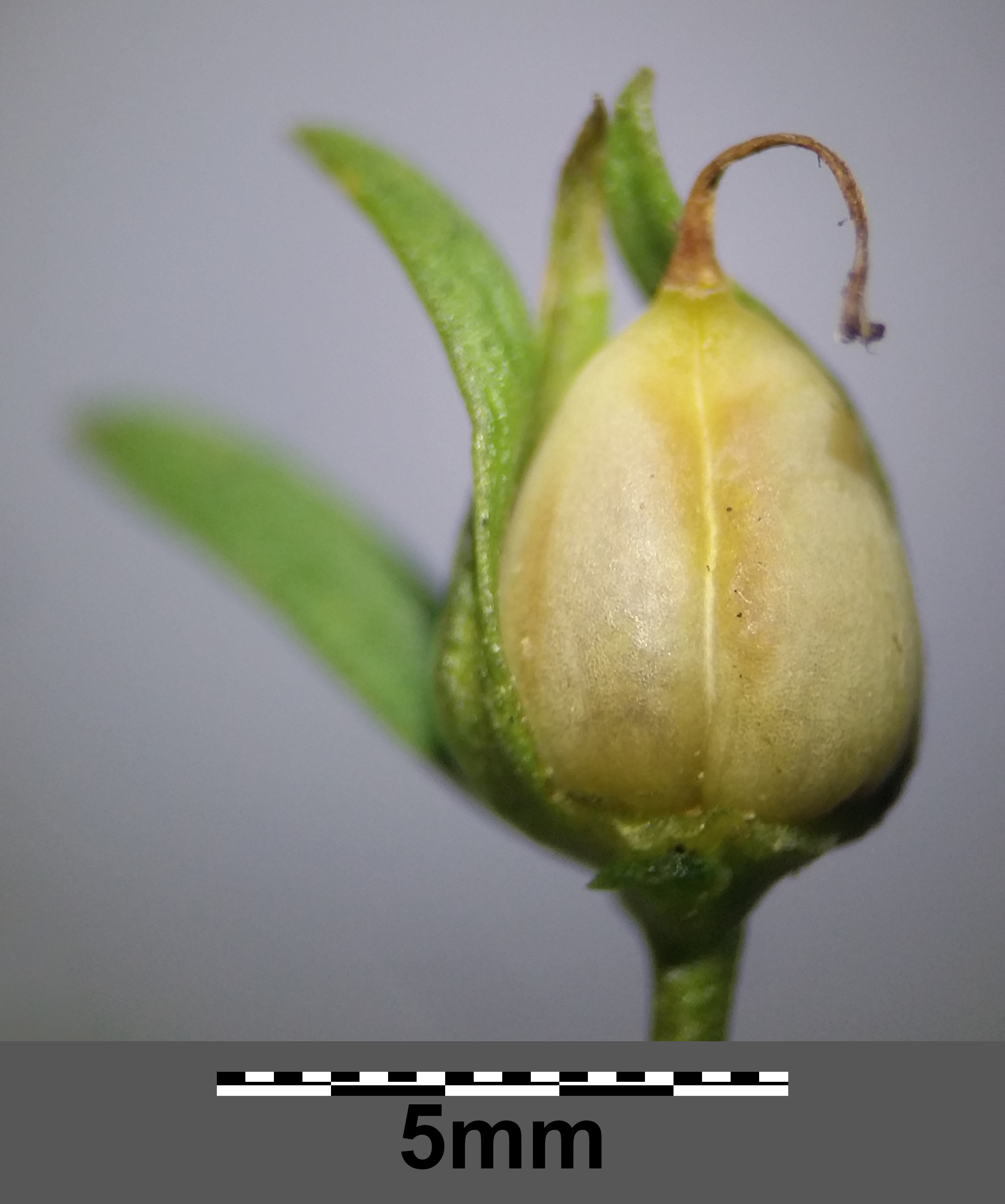
Fruit

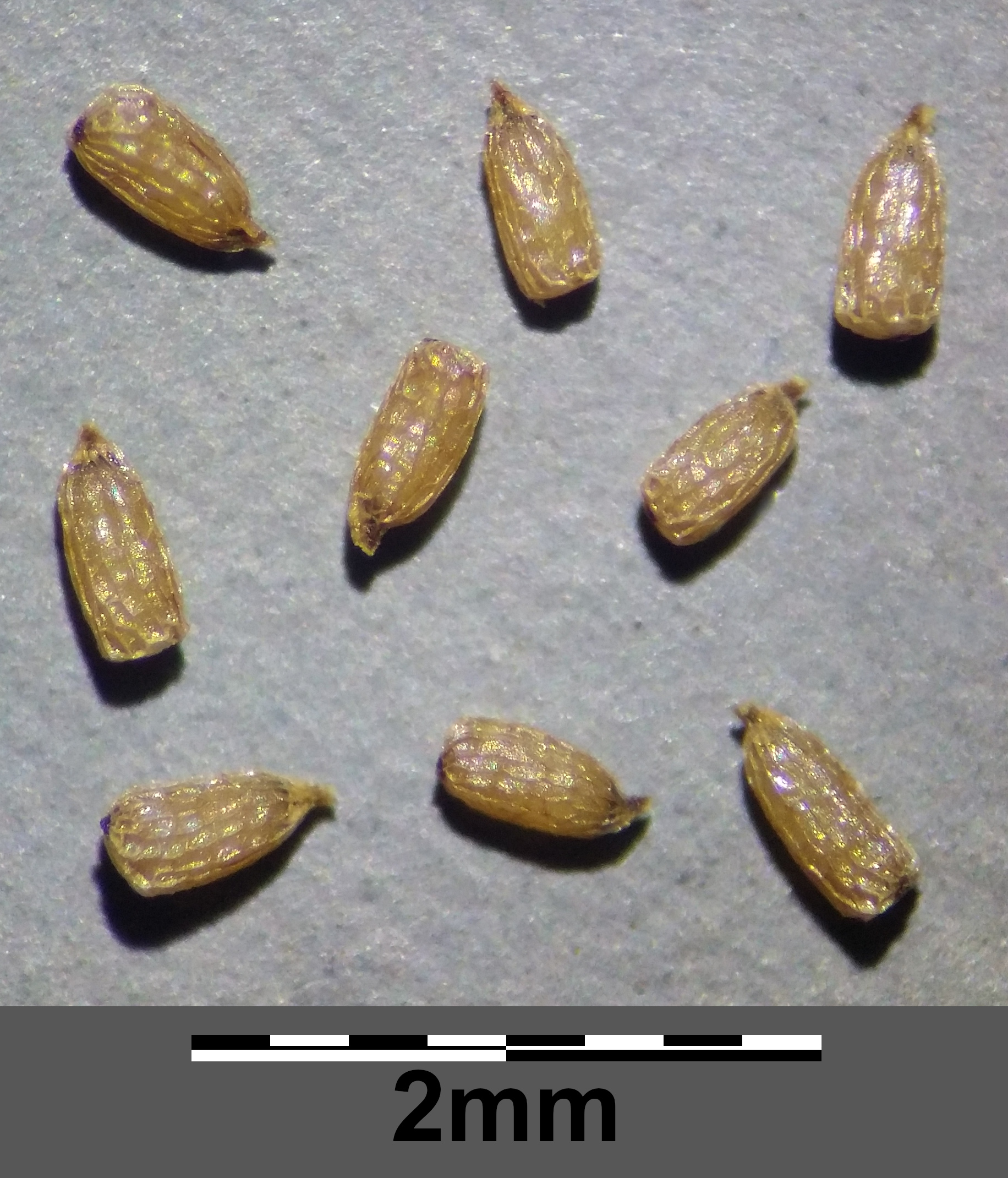
Seeds
