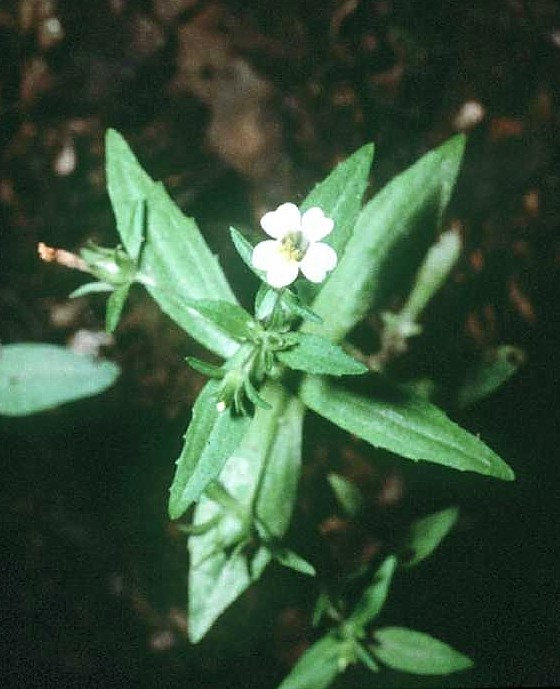

Conservation status
- Secure (NatureServe)

Scientific classification
- Kingdom: Plantae
- Clade: Tracheophytes
- Clade: Angiosperms
- Clade: Eudicots
- Clade: Asterids
- Order: Lamiales
- Family: Plantaginaceae
- Genus: Gratiola
- Species: G. neglecta

Binomial name
- Gratiola neglecta Torr.

= Gratiola neglecta =

Plant species in the veronica family

Gratiola neglecta is a species of flowering plant known by the common name clammy hedgehyssop. It is native to much of North America, including most all of the United States and the southern half of Canada. It is generally found in moist to wet habitat. This is an unobtrusive annual herb producing a glandular stem up to about 30 centimeters tall. The lance-shaped to oval leaves are arranged oppositely about the stem. They are up to 5 centimeters long and sometimes toothed along the edges. The inflorescence is a raceme of nearly cylindrical tubular whitish flowers each about a centimeter long. At the base of each flower is a fringe of five pointed sepals. The fruit is a spherical capsule about half a centimeter wide.

== Taxonomy ==
Gratiola neglecta was scientifically described and named in 1819 by John Torrey. It is part of the genus Gratiola, which is classified in the Plantaginaceae family. It has no accepted varieties, but does have a variety name in its seven heterotypic synonyms.

Table of Synonyms
Name	Year	Rank
Conobea borealis Spreng.	1822	species
Gratiola gracilis Benth.	1846	species
Gratiola heterophylla Raf.	1840	species
Gratiola lutea var. glaberrima Fernald	1932	variety
Gratiola neglecta var. glaberrima (Fernald) Fernald	1949	variety
Gratiola odorata Raf.	1840	species
Gratiola officinalis var. caroliniensis Pers.	1805	variety
