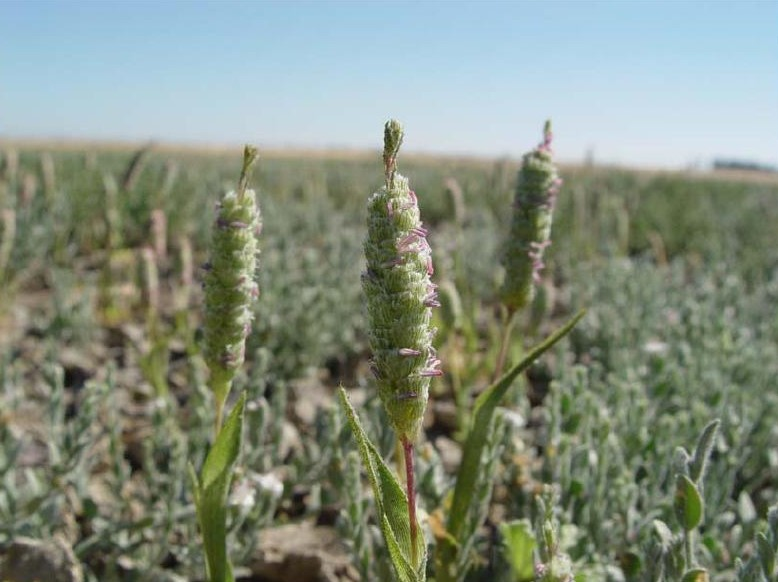

Conservation status
- Threatened (ESA)

Scientific classification
- Kingdom: Plantae
- Clade: Tracheophytes
- Clade: Angiosperms
- Clade: Monocots
- Clade: Commelinids
- Order: Poales
- Family: Poaceae
- Subfamily: Chloridoideae
- Tribe: Cynodonteae
- Subtribe: Orcuttiinae
- Genus: Neostapfia; Burtt Davy
- Species: N. colusana

Binomial name
- Neostapfia colusana Burtt Davy

Synonyms
- Stapfia Burtt Davy 1898, illegitimate name not Chodat 1897 (a green alga in family Tetrasporaceae); Davyella Hack.; Stapfia colusana Burtt Davy; Anthochloa colusana (Burtt Davy) Scribn.; Davyella colusana (Burtt Davy) Hack.

= Neostapfia =

Colusa grass

Genus of flowering plants

Neostapfia is a genus of endemic Californian bunchgrasses, in the subfamily Chloridoideae of the grass family, Poaceae. The only known species is Neostapfia colusana, with the common name Colusa grass.

== Distribution ==
Neostapfia colusana is endemic to the Central Valley of California, in the northern section's Sacramento Valley and in the southern section's San Joaquin Valley. The bunchgrass grows in vernal pools, which are seasonal shallow freshwater ponds.

It is native to the Central Valley counties of Glenn, Colusa, Yolo, Solano, Stanislaus, and Merced.

This rare grass is a federally listed threatened species in the United States.

== Description ==
Neostapfia colusana is a clumping bunchgrass with distinctive cylindrical inflorescences covered in flat spikelets. The inflorescences are said to resemble tiny ears of corn. They fruit in grains covered in a gluey secretion, and when a plant is mature, each clump becomes brown and sticky with the exudate. The genus was named for botanist Otto Stapf.

=== Conservation ===
The plant is limited to vernal pool habitats, a type of ecosystem that is increasingly rare as Central Valley land is consumed by development and agriculture, and damaged by flood-control regimens and other alterations of hydrology.
