= Vernal pool =

Seasonal pools of water that provide habitat

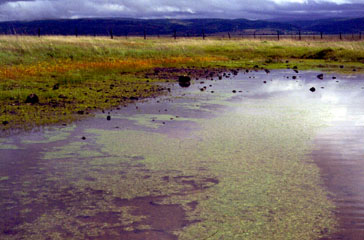
Vernal pool with clay hardpan bottom, Vina Plains Nature Conservancy Preserve, California, United States

Vernal pools, also called vernal ponds or ephemeral pools, are seasonal pools of water that provide habitat for distinctive plants and animals. They are considered to be a unique type of wetland usually devoid of fish, and thus allow the safe development of natal amphibian and insect species unable to withstand competition or predation by fish. Certain tropical fish lineages (such as killifishes), however, have adapted to this habitat specifically.

Vernal pools are a type of wetland. They can be surrounded by many communities/species, including deciduous forest, grassland, lodgepole pine forest, blue oak woodland, sagebrush steppe, succulent coastal scrub and prairie. These pools are characteristic of Mediterranean climates, but occur in many other ecosystems.

== Generation and annual development ==
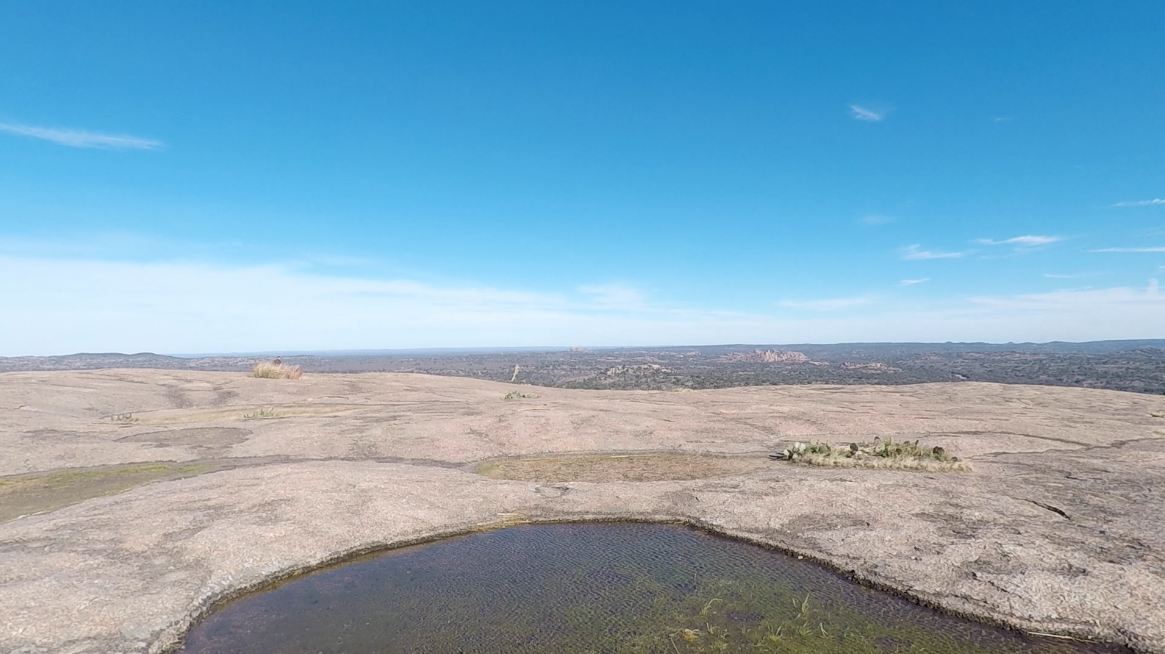
An inundated rock vernal pool on Enchanted Rock. Note the one inhabited by cacti in the background.

During most years, a vernal pool basin will experience inundation from rain/precipitation, followed by desiccation from evapotranspiration. These conditions are commonly associated with a Mediterranean climate, such as the Central Valley of California. Vernal pool basins are often characteristic of Mediterranean climates, but they also occur in many other ecosystems, such as forested areas of the Canadian Shield, where they are difficult to identify due to the dense rest canopy. Most pools are dry for at least part of the year, and fill with the winter rains, spring snowmelts, and rising water tables. Some pools may remain at least partially filled with water over a year or more, but all vernal pools dry up periodically. Typically, though, a vernal pool has three phases each year: it is inundated in the winter (inundated phase) with the vernal pool holding onto the water from 10–65 days, it dries slowly during the spring (flowering phase), and it dries completely during the summer (dry phase). Vernal pools favor native species because many non-native species cannot tolerate the extreme seasonal changes in environmental conditions.

Some vernal pools have an underlying impermeable clay layer (also known as a hardpan) that reduces water percolation. The impermeable layer is hydrophobic, and it prevents water from draining into lower soil layers, allowing vernal pools to become inundated for a very long period of time. This feature of vernal pools means that the water is allowed to slowly evaporate instead of draining. This is a key factor in the development of vernal pool plant communities as it keeps the soil at the water's edge just wet enough for vernal plant communities to flourish, while those closer to the center of the pool are more inundated, leading to zonation of plant communities as the water level recedes. This clay layer also allows pools to exist long enough to prevent upland species from developing, while existing for just enough time to prevent aquatic plant species from taking over.

Some authorities restrict the definition of vernal pools to exclude seasonal wetlands that have defined inlet and outlet channels. The justification is that such seasonal wetlands tend to be qualitatively different from isolated vernal pools; this is because they are fed by larger drainage basins so that firstly, inflow contributes higher concentrations of dissolved minerals. Secondly, flow patterns increase the periodic scouring and silting effect of flows through or simply into the wetland. Thirdly, longer distance inflow and outflow make for less strictly endemic populations and plants. Low dissolved mineral concentrations of smaller vernal pool basins may be characterized as oligotrophic, and poorly buffered with rapid pH shifts due to carbon dioxide uptake during photosynthesis.

Vernal pools are so called because they are often, though not necessarily, at their maximum depth in the spring ("vernal" meaning of, relating to, or occurring in the spring). There are many local names for such pools, depending upon the part of the world in which they occur. Vernal pools may form in forest, but they are more typically associated with grassland and rocky plains or basins. While many vernal pools are only a few meters in width, playas and prairie potholes are usually much larger, but still are otherwise similar in many respects, with high water in wet periods, followed by dry conditions. Some exclude desert playas from the definition of vernal pools because their larger closed drainage basins in areas with high evaporation rates produce higher concentrations of dissolved minerals, with salinity and alkalinity favoring different species. Playas may be inundated less frequently than vernal pools, and inundation typically coincides with colder weather unfavorable for plant growth.

== Ecology ==
Despite being dry at times, vernal pools teem with life when filled, serving as critical breeding grounds for many amphibian and invertebrate species. The most obvious inhabitants are various species of breeding frogs and toads. Some salamanders also utilize vernal pools for reproduction, but the adults may visit the pool only briefly. Other notable inhabitants are Daphnia and fairy shrimp, the latter often used as an indicator species to decisively define a vernal pool. Other indicator species, at least in New England, are the wood frog, the spadefoot toad, and some species of mole salamanders.

While vernal pools can be devoid of fish, in some habitats such as African Savannah vernal pools, killifish may, due to the ability of their eggs to survive desiccation, co-exist with their branchiopod crustacean prey which utilize the same strategy to survive dry periods. Some killifish mature in only three to six weeks in order to make the most use of temporary pools before they disappear.

Some of the species within vernal pools are endangered. Fairy shrimp are crustaceans in the family Branchinectidae. It takes about 30 hours for them to start to hatch in water and it takes 50 days for them to mature. In springtime, the eggs hatch and they can go dormant. There are different types of fairy shrimp in different vernal pools because the pools can act like islands because they are so isolated.

Certain plant species are also associated with vernal pools, although the particular species depend upon the ecological region. The flora of South African vernal pools, for example, are different from those of Californian vernal pools, and they have characteristic Anostraca, such as various Branchipodopsis species. In some northern areas, tadpole shrimp are more common. Some vernal pool inhabitants are becoming threatened due to habitat loss. One of these inhabitants is the California tiger salamander.

== Habitat loss and Conservation ==
Vernal pools harbor a distinct assemblage of flora and fauna that, in some cases, are not found anywhere else on the planet. Despite this fact, about 90% of vernal pool ecosystems in California have been destroyed. Disturbingly, much of this destruction has occurred in recent years, with about 13% of remaining vernal pools being lost in the short interval from 1995 to 2005. The major threats to vernal pool habitats in the Central Valley are agriculture, urbanization, changes in hydrology, climate change, and improperly managed grazing by livestock. They are sensitive to climate and land-use change. Despite this, there is no specific federal protection for vernal ponds in the United States, with regulation instead falling to the state governments.

=== Certification ===
Certification is the process by which vernal ponds become officially recognized by government entities and come under government protection. Massachusetts was the first US state to offer specific protection to vernal ponds in 1987, granting certified pools the same protection as other wetland types and preventing construction up to 100 feet beyond the pool boundary. In Massachusetts, certification is achieved when volunteers submit evidence to be reviewed by a branch of the Division of Fisheries and Wildlife, which then maps out the location if approved. The most common way of achieving the certification is by submitting proof of a breeding population of obligate species, which require a vernal pond to breed. It is also possible to achieve certification without proof of obligate species provided that there is proof that there are other vernal pond species, no fish population, and with further documentation of the site.

Maine offers protection to "significant" vernal ponds and restricts development up to 250 feet beyond the pool boundary. Pools must be assessed by an "individual who has experience and training in either wetland ecology or wildlife ecology" to be considered significant and must contain a population of obligate or threatened species.

=== Restoration ===
Vernal pools are prime habitats to be targeted for restoration work due to their value as hotspots of biodiversity as well as recent history of extensive destruction and degradation. However, there have been varying rates of success attributed to various restoration efforts. Several hypotheses have attempted to explain this:

Hypothesis 1: Constructed pools are too deep.
Hypothesis 2: Edges of constructed pools narrower than natural ones.
Hypothesis 3: Constructed pools have steeper slopes than natural ones.

Results: Research suggest that the last two details (Hypothesis 2 and 3) are crucial in determining the habitat value of man-made vernal pools. In general, most constructed pools were too steep and did not have wide enough edges.

=== Mitigation ===
There has been a fair amount of controversy surrounding the practice of mitigation, which is the destruction of protected or endangered species and habitats, such as vernal pools, on the condition that whatever entity (business, land manager, etc.) is destroying the habitat will undertake the construction of a replacement habitat to "mitigate" their impacts. This concept is difficult to apply to vernal pools, which represent a tremendous habitat value—but are difficult to successfully replicate using construction methods (as mentioned above). Thus, it has been very controversial to apply mitigation strategies to vernal pool systems due to the obvious risks inherent in trying to reconstruct this kind of habitat. Some agencies, however, are now requiring two replacements for every vernal pool that is destroyed to compensate for the lower quality of human-made habitat.

Pennsylvania requires mitigation at a one-to-one ratio if any body of water (including a vernal pond) is destroyed, but stipulates that it must be larger than 0.05 acres, which many vernal ponds are not.

== Soils ==
Vernal pools can form anywhere that a depression fills with rainwater, leading to low nutrients and low levels of dissolved salts. They are underlain with an impermeable layer of claypan, hardpan, or volcanic rock allowing for water retention. In many instances they contain grasslands that form over a variety of soil types containing silts and clays often covered by a layer of interwoven fibrous roots and dead leaves. The soil types present tend to relate to the local soil types and hydrology of the pool. Finer soils such as clay, silt, and muck are more common in perched situations, whereas pools which are more connected to the water table have more coarse soils like sand or gravel. Soils in vernal pools often reflect their inundated conditions, leading to low chroma horizons, mottling, and anoxic decay. They can develop hydric soils which are typical of flooded areas, including accumulations of organic matter, but this may not happen in drier areas. In some cases there is a hardpan layer which causes the retention of water in the pools. The hardpan clay basin accumulates water due to the small particle size and therefore reduced porosity. This permits flooding and development of vernal pools.

== Flora ==
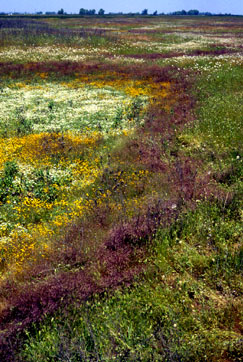
Vernal pool flowers, with different species occurring in zones related to soil moisture and temperature gradients formed as the pool dries out. Sacramento National Wildlife Refuge, California.

In vernal pools, flowering occurs simultaneously because of the seasonality of favorable conditions. Vernal pool ecosystems may include both cosmopolitan species and endemic species adapted to unique environmental conditions. These conditions include moisture gradients, salinity gradients, and reduced levels of competition. Microtopographical gradients also contribute to species distribution in vernal pool communities, where plants that flower sooner in the season are more likely to be found at slightly higher elevations than later flowering species. Many vernal pool plants have buried seeds which accumulate in the soil. Different species are suited to different moisture levels, and as water evaporates from the edges of a pool, distinctive zonation of species can be seen. Most pools receive annual deposition of tree leaves, which are critical to maintaining local life due to leaf detritus.

Many upland perennial plants are unable to withstand the period of flooding. Many wetland plants are unable to withstand the period of desiccation. Therefore, vernal pools are a distinctive habitat that provides a refuge from both terrestrial and fully aquatic plants. When dissolved carbon dioxide is depleted by daytime photosynthesis, vernal pool species like Howell's quillwort (Isoetes howellii) and pygmyweed (Crassula aquatica) collect carbon dioxide nocturnally using Crassulacean acid metabolism. Vernal pool basin habitats favor annual plants with some uniquely adapted perennials which suffer extensive mortality resembling annual reproduction. Annuals comprise approximately 80 percent of vernal pool flora. Listed below are some genera of the approximately one hundred vascular plant species associated with California vernal pool habitats. A typical pool will include only 15 to 25 species.

Cosmopolitan aquatic flora

- quillworts (perennial)
- water clover (perennial)
- pillworts (perennial)
- water starworts
- succulents
- waterworts
- mousetail
- buttercups
- spikerushes (perennial)
- Triglochin scilloides

Vernal pool specialists

- stickyseeds
- calicoflowers
- button parsleys (perennial)
- snorkelwort
- false Venus' looking glass
- pincushion plants
- popcornflowers
- woollyheads
- Colusa grass
- Orcutt grass
- Solano grass

Upland plants commonly found at vernal pools in California include yellow pansies, several sweet-scented clovers, yellow and bright lavender monkeyflowers, star lilies, and yarrow.

Vernal pools are often threatened by development in the same way that other wetlands are. As a result, most pools have been converted into residential zones, roads, and industrial parks. That is why most extant pools occur on protected or private land such as national parks, and ranches.

A large number of rare, endangered species, and endemic species occur in vernal pool areas. For example, the San Diego mesa mint, a highly endangered plant, is found exclusively in vernal pools in the San Diego area. Another example is the wildflower Lasthenia conjugens, which is found in limited parts of the San Francisco Bay Area. A third example is the herb Limnanthes vinculans endemic to Sonoma County, California.

== Fauna ==
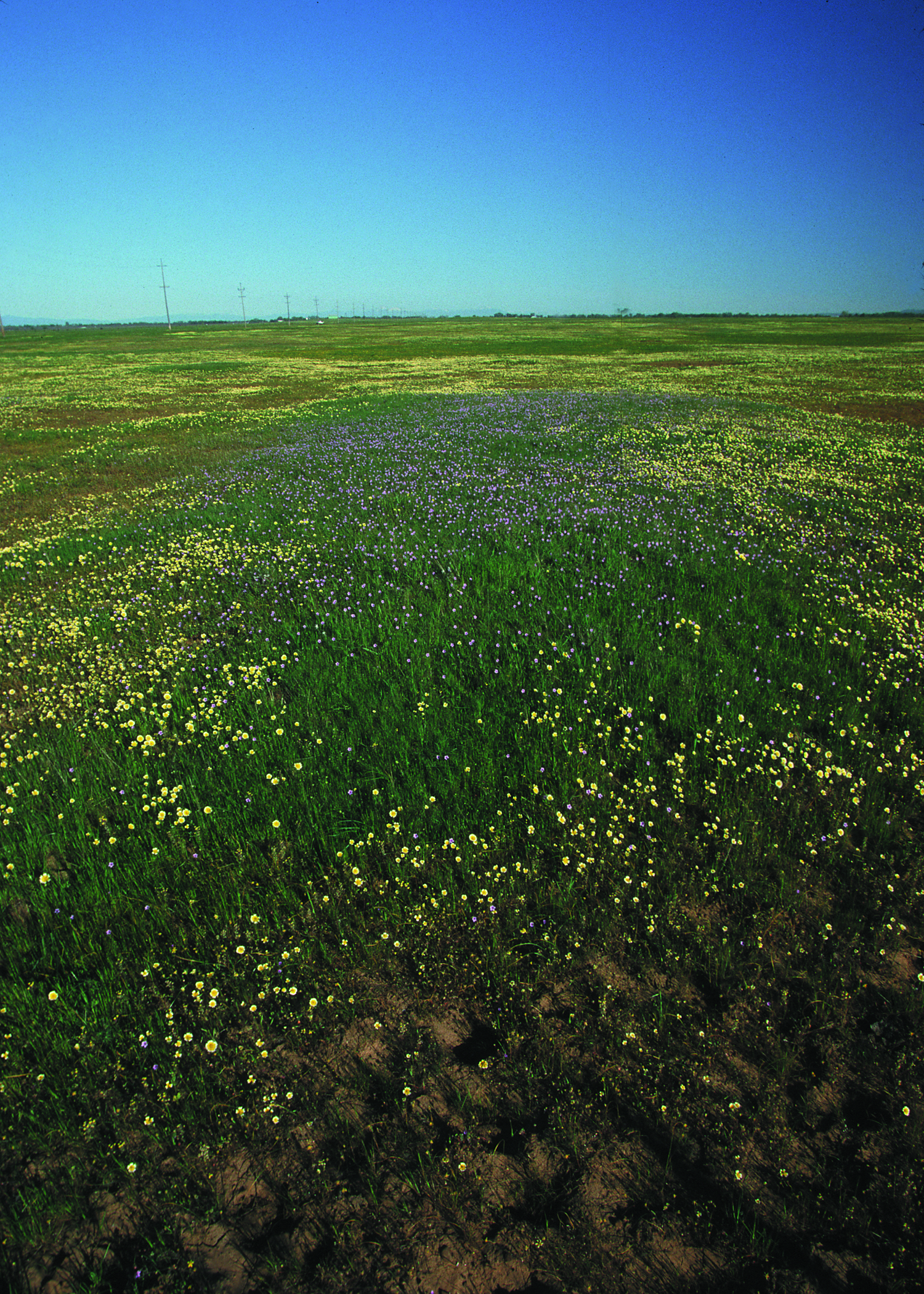
Vernal pool in northern California

Many amphibians that breed only in vernal pools spend most of their lives in the uplands within hundreds of feet of the vernal pool. Eggs are laid in the vernal pool, then the juveniles leave the pool two or three months later, not to return until the following spring to breed. Therefore, the upland areas surrounding a vernal pool are critical for the survival of these species. In California and New York state, the endangered tiger salamander (Ambystoma tigrinum) is dependent on vernal pools to breed as described above. A few other obligate vernal pool species are the marbled salamander (Ambystoma opacum), Jefferson salamander (Ambystoma jeffersonianum), the blue-spotted salamander (Ambystoma laterale) and the spotted salamander (Ambystoma maculatum).

Some other species, notably Anostraca, fairy shrimp, and their relatives, lay eggs capable of entering a state of cryptobiosis. They hatch when rains replenish the water of the pool, and no stage of the animals' life cycle leaves the pool, except when eggs are accidentally transported by animal phoresis, wind, or rarely, by flood. Such animal populations can be ancient when the conditions for seasonal vernal waters are stable enough. As an extreme example, Branchipodopsis relictus on the main island of the Socotra archipelago, which is exceedingly remote for what it is, a continental fragment of Gondwana, is believed to have been isolated since the Miocene. Branchipodopsis relictus is correspondingly isolated genetically as well as geographically.

In California, the conservancy fairy shrimp has been classified as an endangered species under the provisions of the Endangered Species Act of 1973.

Vernal pools can serve as a temporary habitat for migrating birds, especially in California. The rich invertebrate population in these pools provides food for ducks, herons, egrets, plovers, and many other species.

== See also ==
- California native plants
- Gilgai – Small, ephemeral lake in expanding clay soils
- Pond – Relatively small body of standing water
- Riparian zone – Interface between land and a river or stream
- Swamp – Forested wetland
