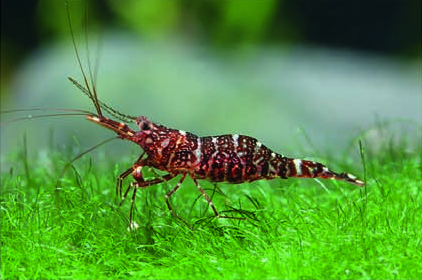
- living specimen of Caridina glaubrechti

Conservation status
- Critically Endangered (IUCN 3.1)

Scientific classification
- Kingdom: Animalia
- Phylum: Arthropoda
- Class: Malacostraca
- Order: Decapoda
- Suborder: Pleocyemata
- Infraorder: Caridea
- Family: Atyidae
- Genus: Caridina
- Species: C. glaubrechti

Binomial name
- Caridina glaubrechti von Rintelen & Cai, 2009

= Caridina glaubrechti =

Species of crustacean

Caridina glaubrechti is species of lacustrine fresh water shrimp endemic to western part of Lake Towuti on the Indonesian island of Sulawesi. It is named in honor of German Zoologist Matthias Glaubrecht.

== Habitat and Ecology ==
C. glaubrechti is mainly found in shallow regions where it dwells on rocks and hard substrate. It is syntopic with Caridina profundicola, Caridina spinata, Caridina striata, and Caridina woltereckae.

== Threats ==
Like many of the shrimp from the lakes of Sulawesi, C. glaubrechti faces a number of threats, including non-native predators, pollution, and the damning of waterways for hydroelectric power.
