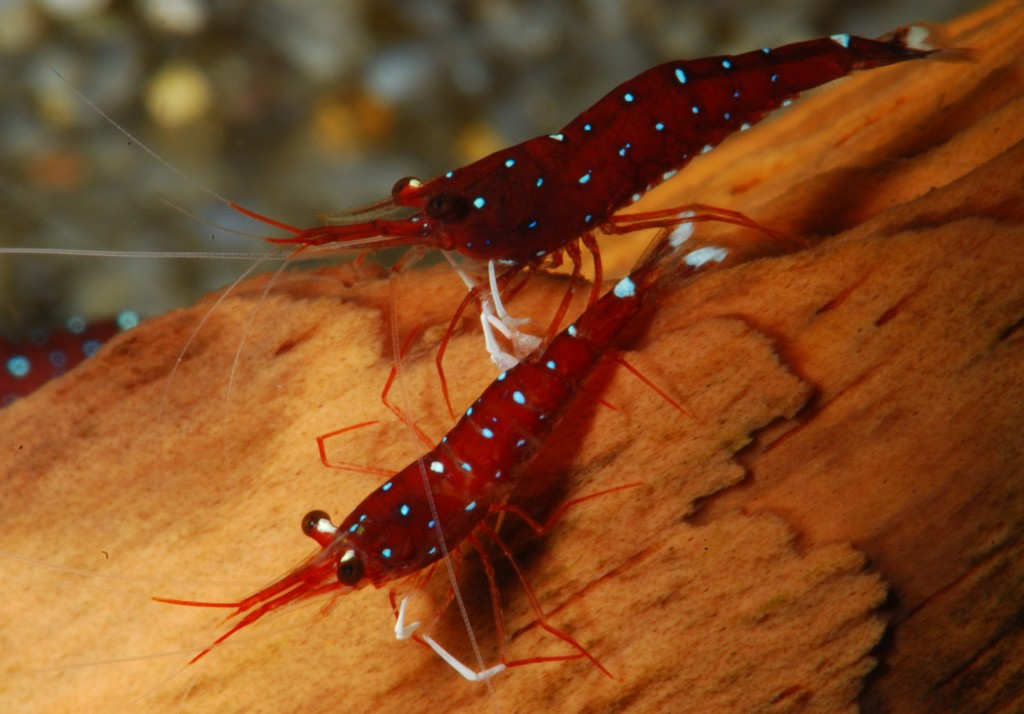

Conservation status
- Critically endangered, possibly extinct in the wild (IUCN 3.1)

Scientific classification
- Kingdom: Animalia
- Phylum: Arthropoda
- Class: Malacostraca
- Order: Decapoda
- Suborder: Pleocyemata
- Infraorder: Caridea
- Family: Atyidae
- Genus: Caridina
- Species: C. dennerli

Binomial name
- Caridina dennerli Von Rintelen & Cai, 2009

= Caridina dennerli =

Species of crustacean

Caridina dennerli is a small species of freshwater shrimp from Sulawesi (Indonesia) that grows up to 2.5 centimetres (1.0 in) in length. It takes its name from the German company Dennerle, which supported the expedition that led to the scientific description of the species. It is popularly known as the cardinal shrimp or Sulawesi shrimp in the aquarium trade.

== Description ==
The female is larger than the male, and has a deeper carapace. The eggs of C. dennerli are relatively large for the size of the shrimp and are carried underneath the female's abdomen.

== Distribution and ecology ==
Caridina dennerli is endemic to Lake Matano and is found among rocks and cliffs, from shallow water down to 10 metres (33 ft). Lake Matano is ultra-oligotrophic, which means that it is extremely nutrient poor and contain very little organic matter. The visibility underwater was estimated to be around 20 m (66 ft). The temperature in Lake Matano varies in the range 27–31 °C (81–88 °F). A pH of 7.4 and a conductivity of 224 μS/cm) have been recorded. C. dennerli is believed to feed on detritus in nature.

== Aquarium ==
Caridina dennerli are considered one of the most attractive species of shrimp in the Caridina genus, becoming increasingly sought after. The shrimp are quite small, with a fully grown adult barely reaching 1 inch in length. They feed on small animals in an established and planted aquarium and are sensitive to water parameter fluctuations.

== Threats ==
This species is threatened by pollution from nickel mining and human activities, introduced species like the flowerhorn cichlid and hydro-electric power plants on the southern shore of Lake Matano. Although previously locally abundant, no Caridina dennerli have been recorded in the wild since 2013 and the species possibly is extinct in the wild. It is kept and bred in captivity.
