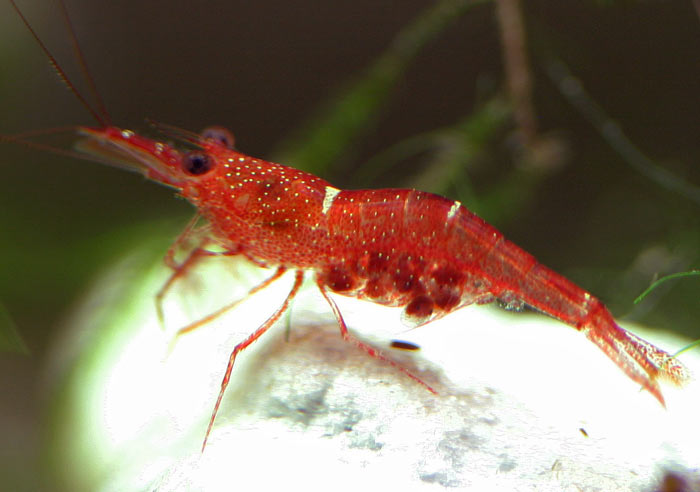
- A female carrying eggs

Conservation status
- Critically Endangered (IUCN 3.1)

Scientific classification
- Kingdom: Animalia
- Phylum: Arthropoda
- Clade: Pancrustacea
- Class: Malacostraca
- Order: Decapoda
- Suborder: Pleocyemata
- Infraorder: Caridea
- Family: Atyidae
- Genus: Caridina
- Species: C. loehae

Binomial name
- Caridina loehae Woltereck, 1937

= Caridina loehae =

Species of crustacean

Caridina loehae is a freshwater shrimp from Sulawesi. It is known as mini blue bee and orange delight shrimp in the aquarium trade. It is endemic to the Malili lake system. It lives on rocky substrates at a maximal depth of 5 metres.

== Threats ==
This species is currently under threat by pollution from human activities and a nickel mine and introduced fish like the flowerhorn cichlid and pacu.
