= Caridina masapi =

Conservation status
- Critically Endangered (IUCN 3.1)

Scientific classification
- Kingdom: Animalia
- Phylum: Arthropoda
- Class: Malacostraca
- Order: Decapoda
- Suborder: Pleocyemata
- Infraorder: Caridea
- Family: Atyidae
- Genus: Caridina
- Species: C. masapi

Binomial name
- Caridina masapi Woltereck, 1937

Species of crustacean

Caridina masapi is a freshwater shrimp from Sulawesi. The species is endemic to the Malili lake system. It is commonly found on rocky substrate.

== Threats ==
The species is under threat by pollution from a nickel mine, eutrophication by nearby human activity, invasive species like the flowerhorn cichlid and pacu and excessive harvesting for the aquarium trade.
