= Caridina lanceolata =

Conservation status
- Critically Endangered (IUCN 3.1)

Scientific classification
- Kingdom: Animalia
- Phylum: Arthropoda
- Class: Malacostraca
- Order: Decapoda
- Suborder: Pleocyemata
- Infraorder: Caridea
- Family: Atyidae
- Genus: Caridina
- Species: C. lanceolata

Binomial name
- Caridina lanceolata Woltereck, 1937

Species of crustacean

Caridina lanceolata is a freshwater shrimp from Sulawesi. It is widespread in the Malili lake system, including all three lakes. It can be found in pelagic swarms, as well as on a variety of substrates.

== Threats ==
This species is currently under threat by pollution from human activities and nickel mining, introduced fish like the flowerhorn cichlid and hydro-electric power plants on the southern shore of Lake Matano. Uncontrolled harvesting for the aquarium might also pose a threat to this species.
