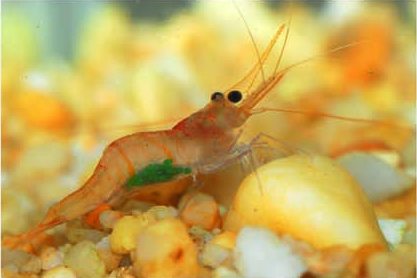
- living specimen of Caridina profundicola

Conservation status
- Critically Endangered (IUCN 3.1)

Scientific classification
- Kingdom: Animalia
- Phylum: Arthropoda
- Class: Malacostraca
- Order: Decapoda
- Suborder: Pleocyemata
- Infraorder: Caridea
- Family: Atyidae
- Genus: Caridina
- Species: C. profundicola

Binomial name
- Caridina profundicola von Rintelen & Cai, 2009

= Caridina profundicola =

Species of crustacean

Caridina profundicola is species of fresh water shrimp endemic to Lake Towuti on the Indonesian island of Sulawesi.

== Habitat and ecology ==
C. profundicola is found in deep (roughly three meters or deeper) parts of lake Towuti, where it lives between submerged bolders and is often found with Caridina spinata.

== Threats ==
Like many of the shrimp from the lakes of Sulawesi, C. profundicola faces a number of threats, including non-native predators, pollution, and the damning of waterways for hydroelectric power.
