= Caridina apodosis =

Conservation status
- Critically Endangered (IUCN 3.1)

Scientific classification
- Kingdom: Animalia
- Phylum: Arthropoda
- Clade: Pancrustacea
- Class: Malacostraca
- Order: Decapoda
- Suborder: Pleocyemata
- Infraorder: Caridea
- Family: Atyidae
- Genus: Caridina
- Species: C. apodosis

Binomial name
- Caridina apodosis Cai & N.K. Ng, 1999

Species of crustacean

Caridina apodosis is a species of freshwater shrimp in the family Atyidae endemic to a mountain stream near the village of Tai Tong, Hong Kong. Caridina apodosis is known from only the type series, collected in 1994. The exact type locality is unknown, and may be completely overtaken by urban sprawl. Caridina apodosis is assessed as Critically Endangered by the IUCN (ver. 3.1) under criterion B1ab(iii)+2ab(iii) with the caveat 'possibly extinct'. C. apodosis is threatened by extensive water pollution as a result of urbanization, and the type locality may be unsuitable for inhabitance.
