= Caridina yunnanensis =

Conservation status
- Least Concern (IUCN 3.1)

Scientific classification
- Kingdom: Animalia
- Phylum: Arthropoda
- Class: Malacostraca
- Order: Decapoda
- Suborder: Pleocyemata
- Infraorder: Caridea
- Family: Atyidae
- Genus: Caridina
- Species: C. yunnanensis

Binomial name
- Caridina yunnanensis Yu, 1938

Species of crustacean

Caridina yunnanensis is a freshwater shrimp from Xundian and Songming Counties, Yunnan, China. It is known to live in mountain streams and reservoirs.
