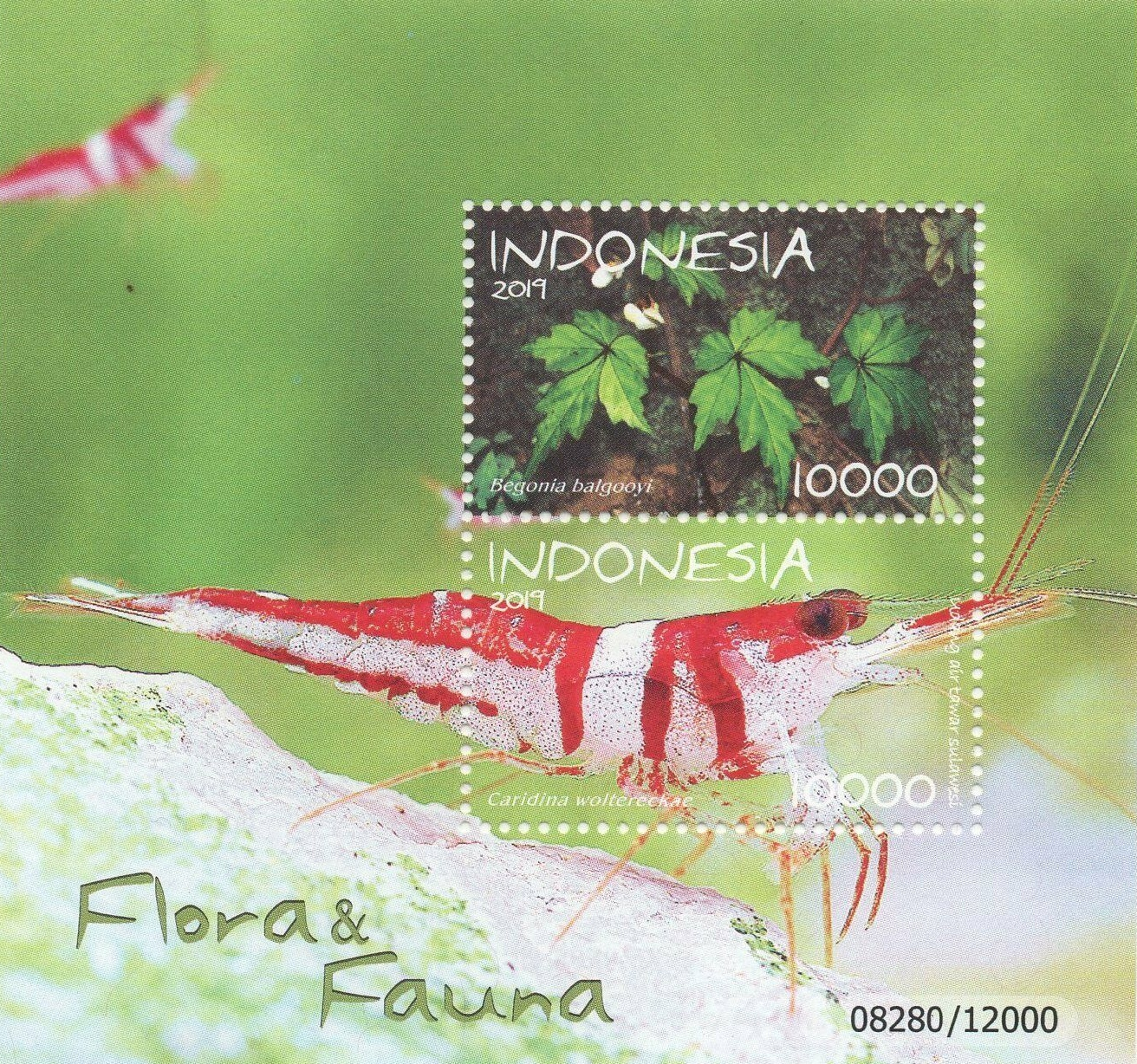

Conservation status
- Critically Endangered (IUCN 3.1)

Scientific classification
- Kingdom: Animalia
- Phylum: Arthropoda
- Class: Malacostraca
- Order: Decapoda
- Suborder: Pleocyemata
- Infraorder: Caridea
- Family: Atyidae
- Genus: Caridina
- Species: C. woltereckae

Binomial name
- Caridina woltereckae Cai, Wowor & Choy, 2009

= Caridina woltereckae =

Species of crustacean

Caridina woltereckae, or Sulawesi harlequin shrimp as it is commonly known in the aquarium hobby, is a freshwater shrimp from Sulawesi, Indonesia. It is endemic to Lake Towuti. It resembles the smaller and less contrastingly coloured Caridina spongicola, which is endemic to the same lake.

== Threats ==
It is found on rocky substrate. It is currently under threat by introduced species like the flowerhorn cichlid, pollution by the human activities and nickel mining and uncontrolled harvesting for the aquarium trade.
