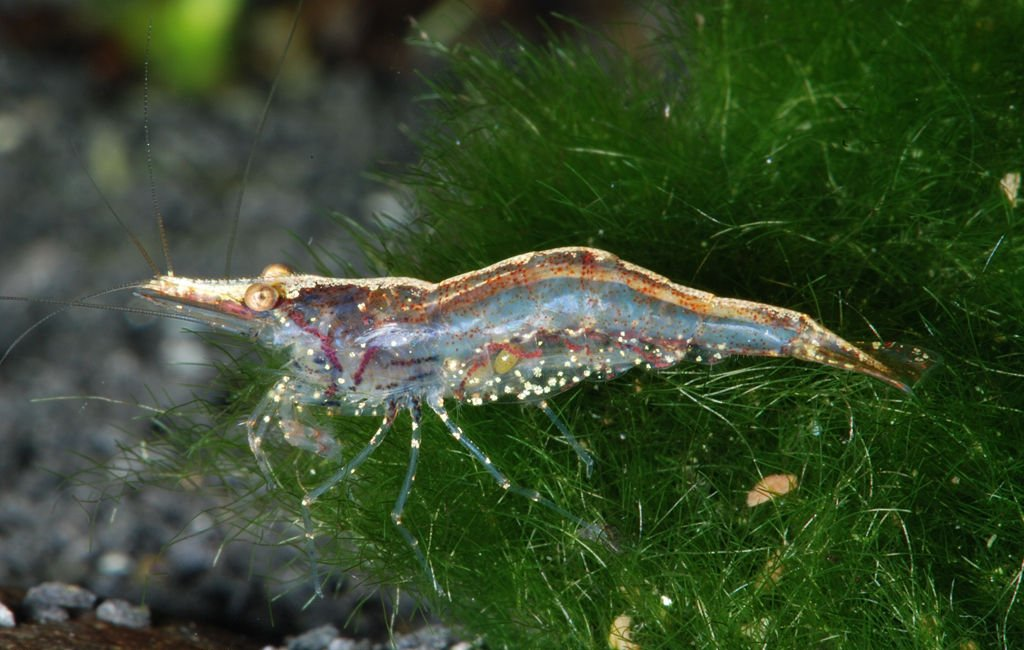

Conservation status
- Least Concern (IUCN 3.1)

Scientific classification
- Kingdom: Animalia
- Phylum: Arthropoda
- Class: Malacostraca
- Order: Decapoda
- Suborder: Pleocyemata
- Infraorder: Caridea
- Family: Atyidae
- Genus: Caridina
- Species: C. simoni

Binomial name
- Caridina simoni Bouvier, 1904

Synonyms
- Caridina kunnathurensis

= Caridina simoni =

Species of crustacean

Caridina simoni is a freshwater shrimp found widespread in Sri Lanka and Tamil Nadu, India. The Indian population was originally described as Caridina kunnathurensis by Richard & Chandran in 1994, but was later identified to be the same species. It is found in a diversity of habitats, including both rivers and lakes.
