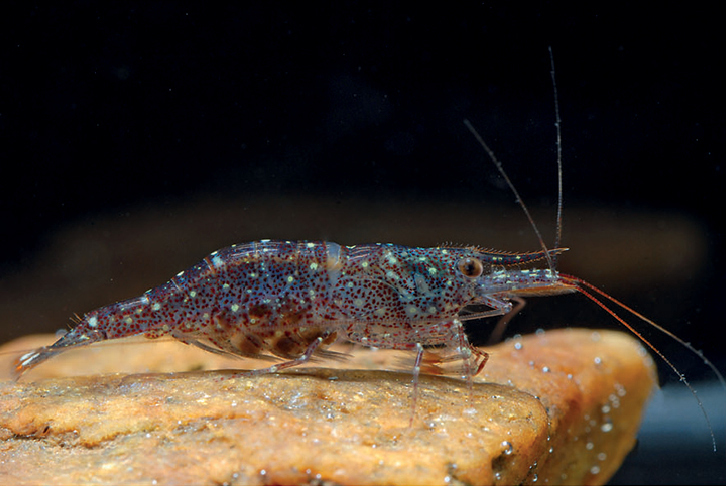

Conservation status
- Vulnerable (IUCN 3.1)

Scientific classification
- Domain: Eukaryota
- Kingdom: Animalia
- Phylum: Arthropoda
- Class: Malacostraca
- Order: Decapoda
- Suborder: Pleocyemata
- Infraorder: Caridea
- Family: Atyidae
- Genus: Caridina
- Species: C. longidigita

Binomial name
- Caridina longidigita Cai & Wowor, 2007
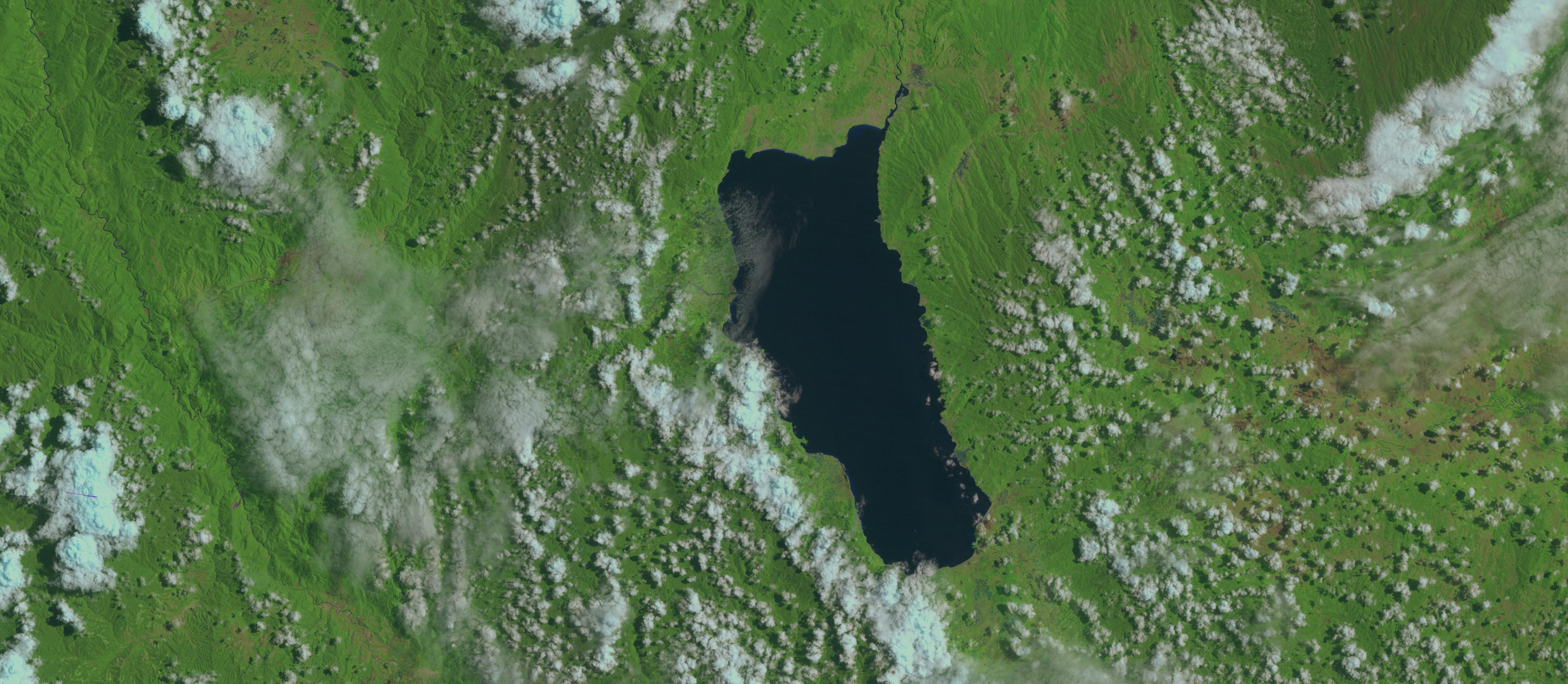
- Lake Poso, Sulawesi, Indonesia

= Caridina longidigita =

Species of crustacean

Caridina longidigita, also known as the Sulawesi fan shrimp, is a species of freshwater atyid shrimp.

== Description ==
=== Eyes ===
Caridina longidigita possesses well-developed eyes, extending to approximately 0.8 times the length of the basal segment of the antennular peduncle. The antennular peduncle itself is around 0.86 times the length of the carapace. It consists of a basal segment that matches the combined length of the second and third segments. Notably, the stylocerite located on the antennular peduncle reaches near the end of the basal segment.

=== Rostrum and mouthparts ===
The rostrum of C. longidigita is a distinctive feature, extending close to or slightly beyond the end of the scaphocerite. It curves upwards anteriorly and is armed with a varying number of teeth on its dorsal and ventral sides. Along the dorsal side, the rostrum carries 12 to 21 teeth, mainly located on the posterior half to three-fourths of its length. Some teeth can also be found on the carapace posterior to the orbital margin. The ventral side of the rostrum bears 10 to 18 teeth.

The mandible exhibits an incisor process ending in irregular teeth, while the molar process is truncated. The lower lacinia of the maxillula is broadly rounded, and the upper lacinia is elongated with distinct teeth along its inner margin. The maxilla has subdivided upper endites and a slender, elongated palp. The scaphognathite of the maxilla tapers posteriorly and is adorned with numerous long, curved setae at its posterior end. The first maxilliped features a palp that terminates in a broad triangular form, and the second maxilliped has a reduced podobranch.

=== Abdominal segments and telson ===
Caridina longidigita possesses multiple abdominal segments, the sixth segment is approximately half the length of the carapace and shorter than the telson, while being twice as long as the fifth segment. The telson itself is 3.1 times longer than its width and lacks a terminating projection. On the distal half of the telson, there are four pairs of dorsal spinules. Additionally, four pairs of distal spines are present, with the lateral pair being the longest, followed by the intermediate pairs, and the median pair being the shortest. Both the telson and preanal carina bear spines. The shrimps uropodal diaeresis possesses 11 to 14 movable spinules.

=== Reproductive structures ===
For male individuals, their first pleopod displays an endopod that is subtriangular and about 0.3 times the length of the exopod. No appendix interna is present in this context. Moving to the second pleopod, the appendix masculina is relatively short, reaching about half the length of the endopod. The appendix interna, also short, measures approximately 0.3 times the length of the appendix masculina.

== Distribution and habitat ==
Caridina longidigita is an endemic species exclusively native to Lake Poso, located in Sulawesi, Indonesia. This freshwater lake spans an area of 323.2 square kilometers and serves as the only natural habitat for C. longidigita. C. longidigita can be found on the rocky shores of the lake, on gravel and sandy substrates. The species is frequently found underwater at depths below 3 meters where it can be found living on the surface of large boulders. Water temperature in the lake ranges from 24 °C to 29 °C (75 °F - 84 °F). The water is also alkaline ranging between 9 - 10 ph.

== Etymology ==
The species name longidigita combines two different Latin words, "long" and "digita" referring to its extremely long, fan-like fingers.
