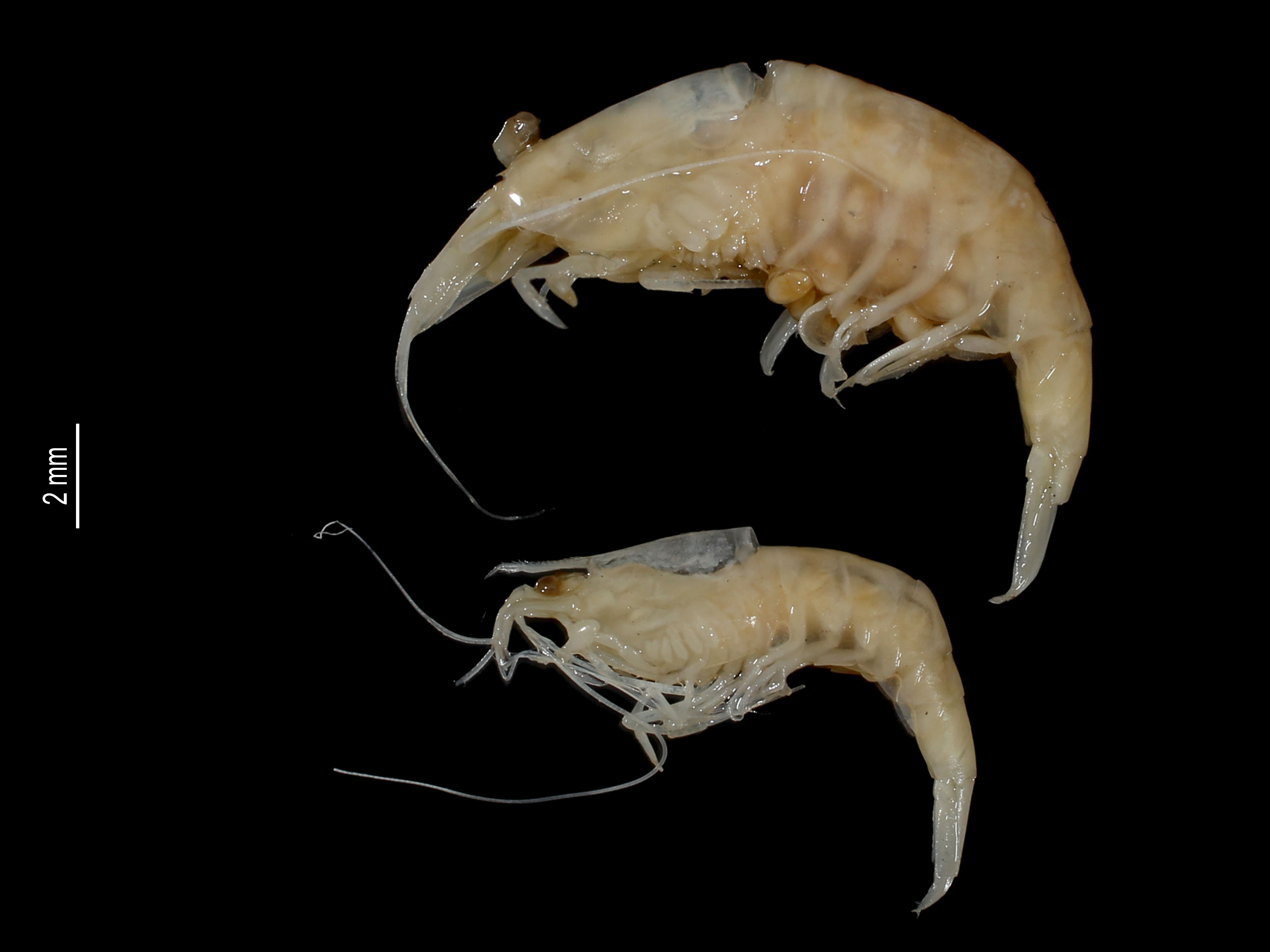
- Preserved specimen of Caridina linduensis

Conservation status
- Critically Endangered (IUCN 3.1)

Scientific classification
- Kingdom: Animalia
- Phylum: Arthropoda
- Class: Malacostraca
- Order: Decapoda
- Suborder: Pleocyemata
- Infraorder: Caridea
- Family: Atyidae
- Genus: Caridina
- Species: C. linduensis

Binomial name
- Caridina linduensis J. Roux, 1904

= Caridina linduensis =

Species of crustacean

Caridina linduensis is a species of freshwater shrimp in the family Atyidae, endemic to Lake Lindu and its effluent stream in Sulawesi. It was known only from the type series, collected in 1904, and was recorded again in 2011 in a survey around Lake Lindu and is found in shallow littoral habitats of leaf litter, macrophytes, and dead wood. In the effluent stream it is found on soft substrates and slow flowing water, and is less common in the lake itself. The type locality of Lake Lindu was designated as a Recreation Park in 1978, and is part of the larger Lore Lindu National Park and UNESCO Biosphere Reserve. It is listed under IUCN criterion B1ab(iii,v) as Critically Endangered due to threats from introduced species of fish (Cyprinus carpio, Clarias batrachus, & Oreochromis spp.), land conversion to agriculture, logging, and shore disturbance caused by the grazing of water buffalo. Surveys are required to find the full distribution of C. linduensis, primarily its habitat in the effluent stream. C. linduensis is also sympatric with the recently described species Caridina dali and Caridina kaili.
