= Caridina ensifera =

Conservation status
- Vulnerable (IUCN 3.1)

Scientific classification
- Kingdom: Animalia
- Phylum: Arthropoda
- Class: Malacostraca
- Order: Decapoda
- Suborder: Pleocyemata
- Infraorder: Caridea
- Family: Atyidae
- Genus: Caridina
- Species: C. ensifera

Binomial name
- Caridina ensifera Schenkel, 1902

Species of crustacean

Caridina ensifera is a freshwater shrimp from Sulawesi. It is one of the 11 species of Caridina endemic to Lake Poso. It lives on a variety of substrates, including wood, rocks, sand and macrophytes, but is also found in pelagic swarms. It is suspected to only live in shallow water.
