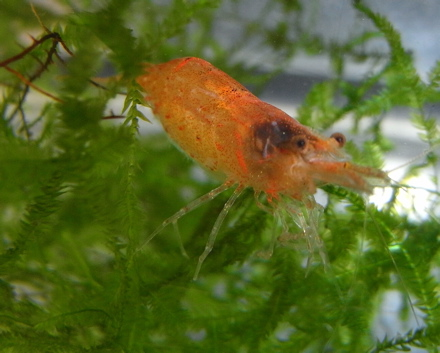

Conservation status
- Least Concern (IUCN 3.1)

Scientific classification
- Domain: Eukaryota
- Kingdom: Animalia
- Phylum: Arthropoda
- Class: Malacostraca
- Order: Decapoda
- Suborder: Pleocyemata
- Infraorder: Caridea
- Family: Atyidae
- Genus: Caridina
- Species: C. thambipillai

Binomial name
- Caridina thambipillai Johnson, 1961

= Caridina thambipillai =

Species of crustacean

Caridina thambipillai is a species of freshwater shrimp in the family Atyidae. It is native to Malaysia and Myanmar, where it occurs in streams. It is a common crustacean of the freshwater aquarium trade, where it is known as the Sunkist shrimp.

This species is usually brightly colored, but brown specimens are known. It is omnivorous.

Little is known about the status of the species in the wild. It is not considered to be threatened, but it is sometimes harvested from the wild for sale in the pet trade.
