= Caridina semiblepsia =

Conservation status
- Vulnerable (IUCN 3.1)

Scientific classification
- Kingdom: Animalia
- Phylum: Arthropoda
- Class: Malacostraca
- Order: Decapoda
- Suborder: Pleocyemata
- Infraorder: Caridea
- Family: Atyidae
- Genus: Caridina
- Species: C. semiblepsia

Binomial name
- Caridina semiblepsia Guo, Choy & Gui, 1996

Species of crustacean

Caridina semiblepsia is a cave dwelling freshwater shrimp from China. It is only known from one location: the Baojing Cave in the province of Hunan.
