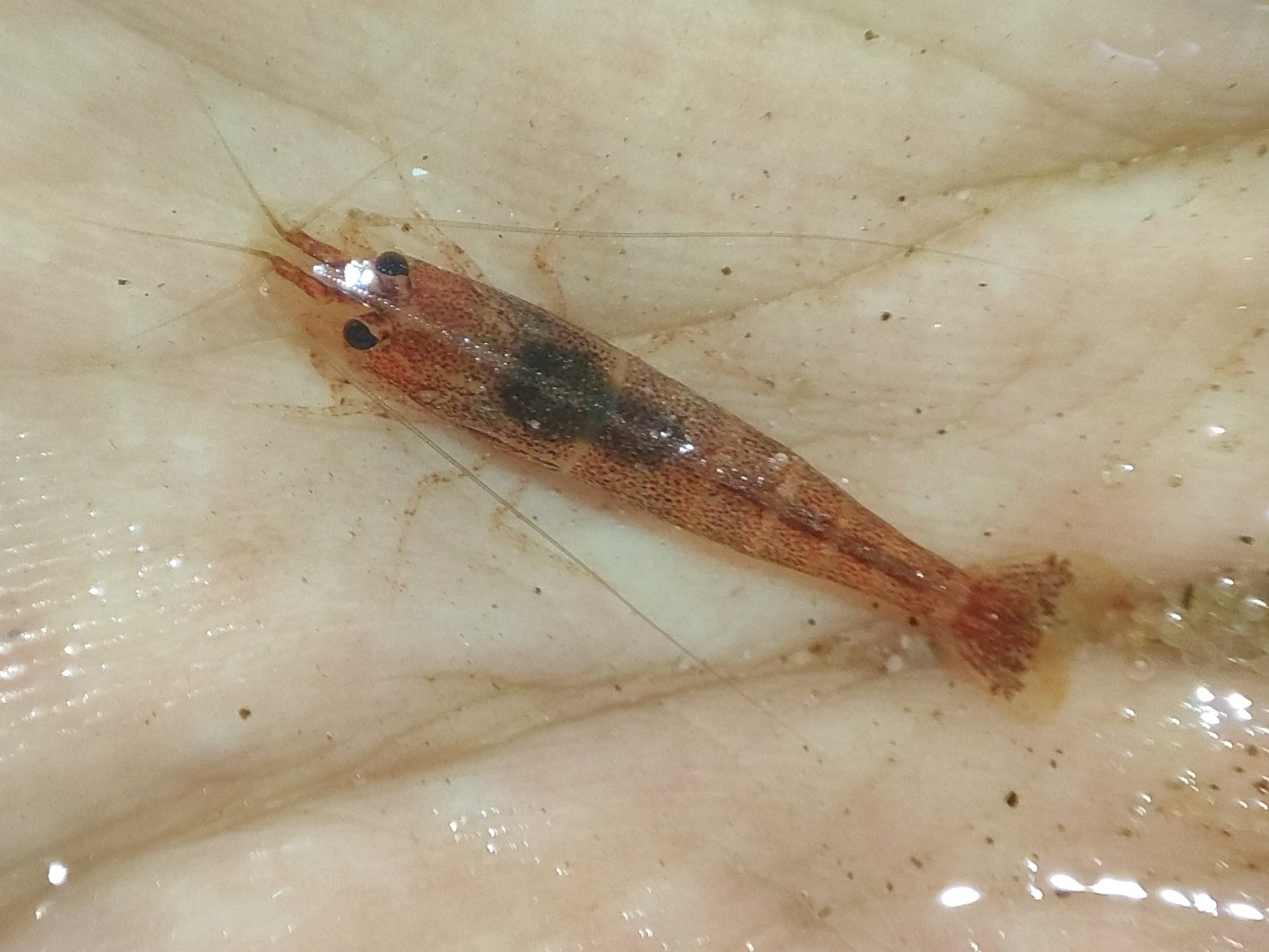

Conservation status
- Least Concern (IUCN 3.1)

Scientific classification
- Kingdom: Animalia
- Phylum: Arthropoda
- Class: Malacostraca
- Order: Decapoda
- Suborder: Pleocyemata
- Infraorder: Caridea
- Family: Atyidae
- Genus: Caridina
- Species: C. fernandoi

Binomial name
- Caridina fernandoi Arudpragasam & Costa, 1962

= Caridina fernandoi =

Species of crustacean

Caridina fernandoi is a freshwater shrimp endemic to Sri Lanka, often found in lowland reservoir, slow flowing rivers and streams.
