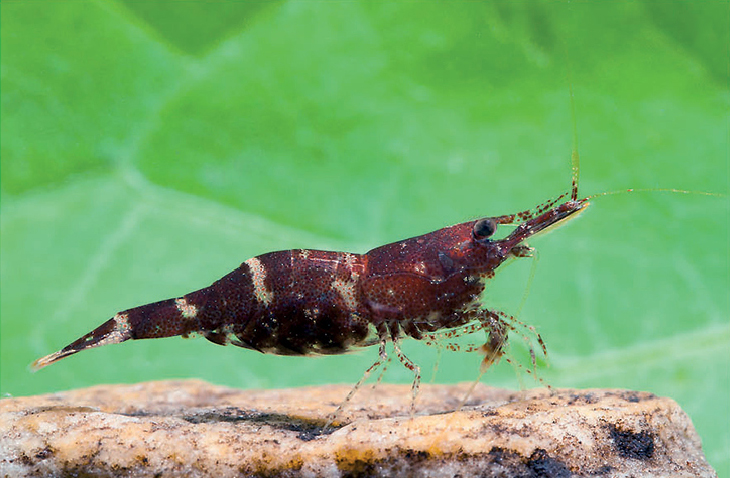

Conservation status
- Vulnerable (IUCN 3.1)

Scientific classification
- Domain: Eukaryota
- Kingdom: Animalia
- Phylum: Arthropoda
- Class: Malacostraca
- Order: Decapoda
- Suborder: Pleocyemata
- Infraorder: Caridea
- Family: Atyidae
- Genus: Caridina
- Species: C. sarasinorum

Binomial name
- Caridina sarasinorum Schenkel, 1902
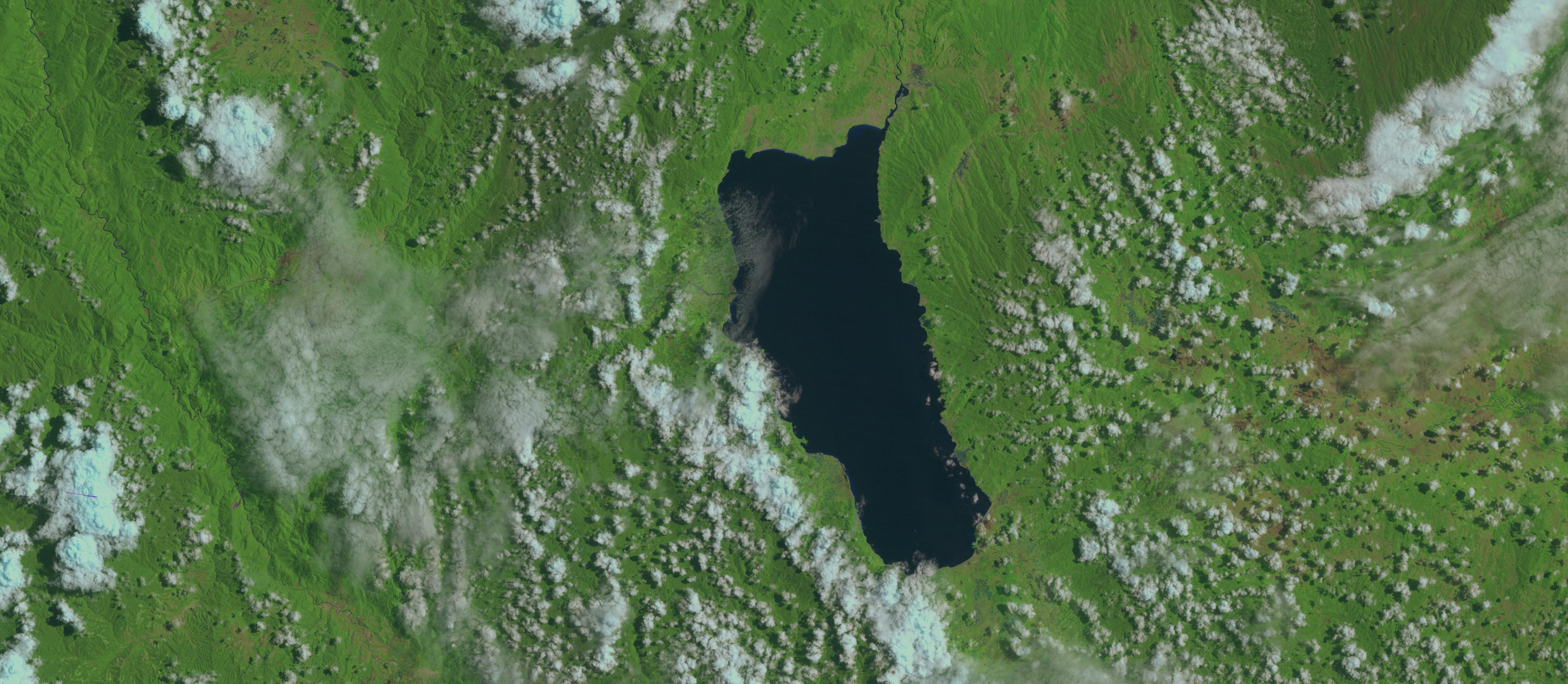
- Lake Poso, Sulawesi, Indonesia

= Caridina sarasinorum =

Species of crustacean

Caridina sarasinorum is a species of freshwater atyid shrimp. It is one of eight Caridina species endemic to Lake Poso.

== Description ==
=== Eyes and antennular peduncle ===
Caridina sarasinorum has well-developed eyes that reach to around 80% of the length of the basal segment. The antennular peduncle, is as long as the body itself. It consists of several segments, including a basal segment, a second segment, and a third segment. The basal segment is longer than the combined length of the second and third segments. These antennular structures help the organism in sensory perception and detecting its surroundings.

=== Rostrum, mouthparts and abdominal segments ===
The rostrum of Caridina sarasinorum is located near or slightly beyond the end of the scaphocerite. The rostrum is curved upwards and possesses teeth on its upper and lower sides. Moving to the mouthparts, the organism has various structures responsible for capturing and processing food. These structures include the mandible, which has teeth at its front end, and the maxillula, which has rounded lower parts and elongated upper parts with teeth. The maxilla has subdivided upper parts and a tapering structure called the scaphognathite. Additionally, the organism has multiple abdominal segments, with the sixth segment being about 60-70% the length of the carapace. The telson, located at the end of the abdomen, is longer than it is wide and bears spines and spinules.

=== Telson and uropodal diaeresis ===
The telson, which is the terminal part of the abdomen, has specific characteristics. It is about 4.1 times longer than its width and lacks a projecting structure at its termination. On the distal half of the telson, there are 3-5 pairs of small spines along with 3 or 4 pairs of longer spines. The uropodal diaeresis, located at the rear end of the organism, possesses movable spinules.

=== Reproductive structures and eggs ===
Male Caridina sarasinorum have identifiable reproductive structures. The first pleopod has two parts: the endopod and the exopod. The endopod is sub-rectangular and measures about one-fourth the length of the exopod. The second pleopod has an appendix called the appendix masculina, which is short and reaches about half the length of the endopod. C. sarasinorum also possesses a structure called the appendix interna, which is stout and about half the length of the appendix masculina. Females carry the eggs under their abdomens. Eggs are relatively small, measuring approximately 0.85 × 0.5 mm.

== Distribution and habitat ==
Caridina sarasinorum is an endemic species to Lake Poso, situated exclusively in Sulawesi, Indonesia. The habitat of C. sarasinorum encompasses 323.2 square kilometers of the lake. C. sarasinorum is a generalist that can be found on the rocky shores inhabiting various substrates such as rock and sand. The shrimp can also be found living on wood and aquatic plants. The water of the lake is freshwater and alkaline with a PH ranging from 9 - 10. The temperature of the lake water ranges from 24 °C to 29 °C (75 °F - 84 °F).
