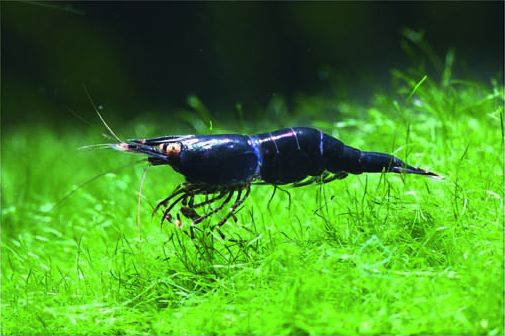
- Living specimen of Caridina holthuisi

Conservation status
- Endangered (IUCN 3.1)

Scientific classification
- Kingdom: Animalia
- Phylum: Arthropoda
- Class: Malacostraca
- Order: Decapoda
- Suborder: Pleocyemata
- Infraorder: Caridea
- Family: Atyidae
- Genus: Caridina
- Species: C. holthuisi

Binomial name
- Caridina holthuisi von Rintelen & Cai, 2009

= Caridina holthuisi =

Species of crustacean

Caridina holthuisi is a species of freshwater shrimp in the family Atyidae, endemic to the Malili lake system in Sulawesi, Indonesia. It can be found in Lake Towuti, Lake Matano, and Lake Mahalona, as well as the Petea river. It is named in honour of Dutch carcinologist, Lipke Holthuis.

== Habitat and ecology ==
Caridina holthuisi can be primarily found in shallow water amongst leaf litter and other soft substrates.
