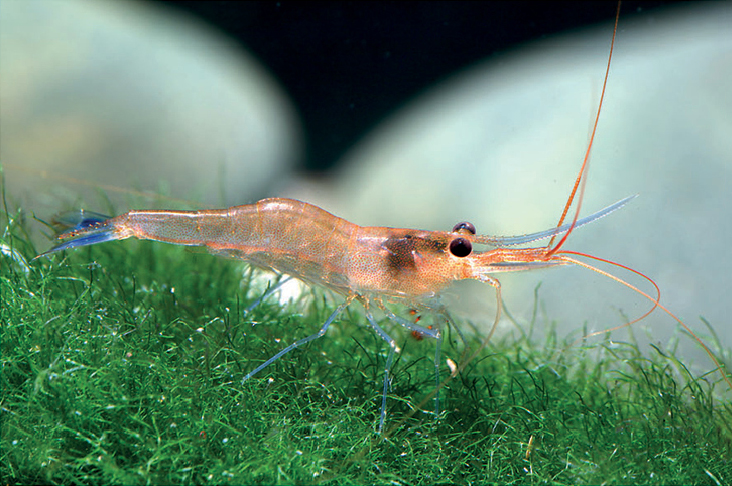

Conservation status
- Vulnerable (IUCN 3.1)

Scientific classification
- Kingdom: Animalia
- Phylum: Arthropoda
- Class: Malacostraca
- Order: Decapoda
- Suborder: Pleocyemata
- Infraorder: Caridea
- Family: Atyidae
- Genus: Caridina
- Species: C. caerulea

Binomial name
- Caridina caerulea von Rintelen & Cai, 2009

= Caridina caerulea =

Species of crustacean

Caridina caerulea is a freshwater shrimp from Sulawesi. It is one of 11 species in the genus Caridina that is endemic to Lake Poso. It lives on a variety of substrates, including wood, rocks, sand and macrophytes. It is suspected only to live in shallow water.
