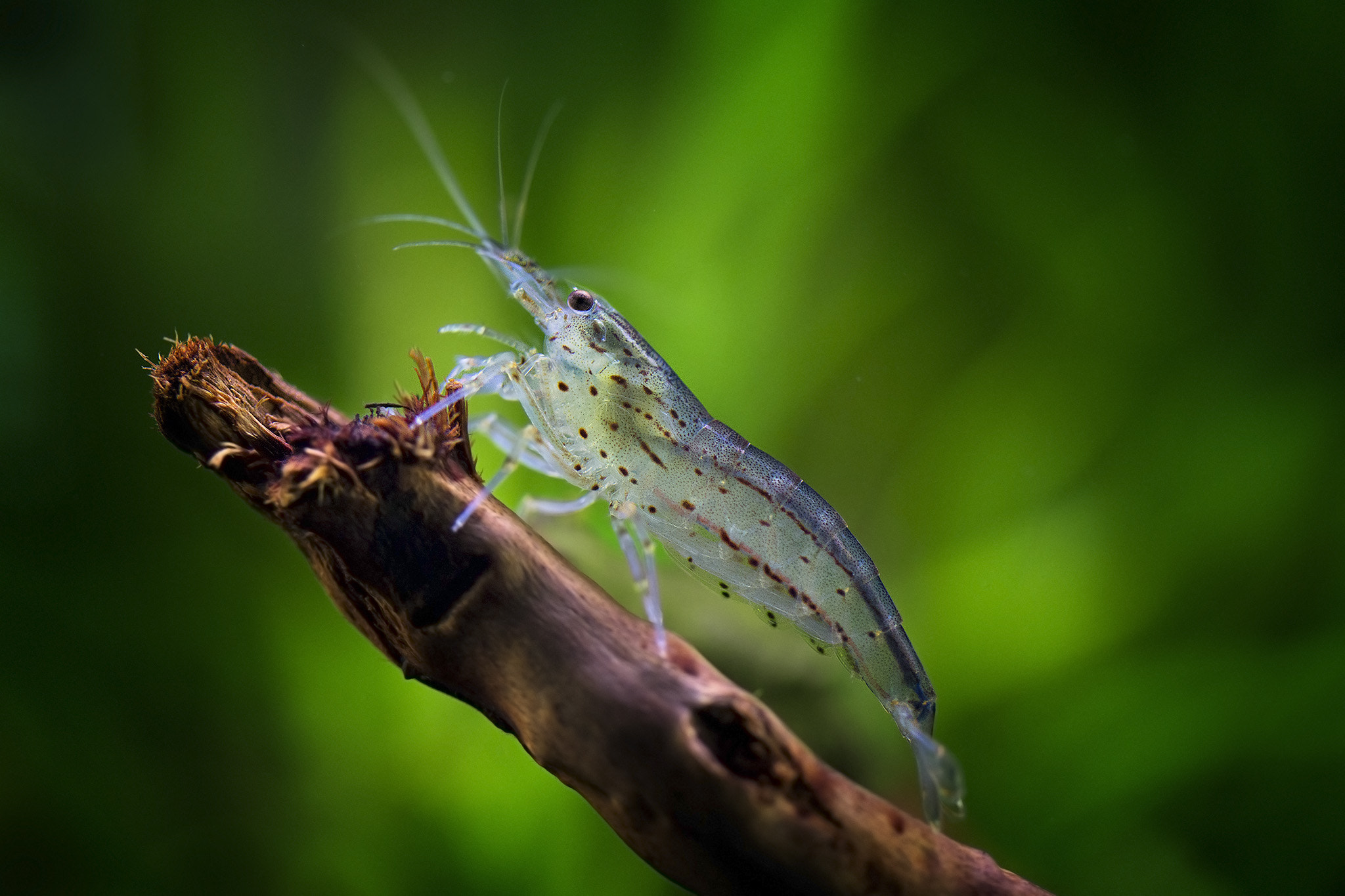

Conservation status
- Least Concern (IUCN 3.1)

Scientific classification
- Kingdom: Animalia
- Phylum: Arthropoda
- Clade: Pancrustacea
- Class: Malacostraca
- Order: Decapoda
- Suborder: Pleocyemata
- Infraorder: Caridea
- Family: Atyidae
- Genus: Caridina
- Species: C. multidentata

Binomial name
- Caridina multidentata Stimpson, 1860

= Caridina multidentata =

Species of shrimp

Caridina multidentata is a species of shrimp in the family Atyidae. It is native to Japan and Taiwan. Its common names include Yamato shrimp, Japanese shrimp, Amano shrimp, and algae shrimp.

== Description ==
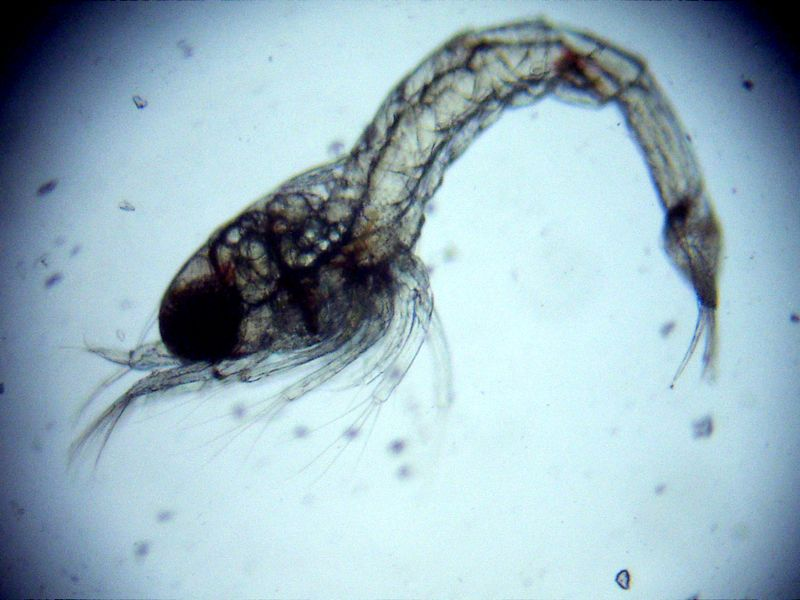
Caridina multidentata larva

Caridina multidentata are freshwater shrimp in the family Atyidae and are commonly found in southwestern Japan. They typically grow to 25–35 millimetres (0.98–1.38 in). This species of shrimp is amphidromous. Oviposition and hatching occurs in freshwater, and newly hatched larvae drift to saltwater and develop as juveniles, returning to freshwater in their adult forms. The eggs of Caridina multidentata are rich in yolk and are oval-shaped.

The species has adapted to live in fast-flowing water, having a wide and short rostrum. Caridina multidentata begin to take in food in the third zoeal stage, relying on internal nutrition longer than distant relatives such as the Caridina leucosticta and Caridina typus. They have a large geographic distribution, suggesting high levels of larval dispertion. This species has a translucent body covered with a broken line of reddish brown points on its sides. The dorsal surface has a white stripe that runs from the head to the tail and the eyes are black. Females are easily distinguished from males by their more elongated lower row of dots.

Caridina multidentata fare best in temperatures of 18 °C to 28 °C (approximately 64 °F to 82 °F). They are more active at higher temperatures, but may also have a shorter lifespan. They prefer a pH of 6.5 to 7.5. As with all crustaceans, they are extremely averse to copper due to their haemocyanin blood.

== In the aquarium ==
Caridina multidentata was introduced into the world of aquaria by Takashi Amano in the early 1980s. They are usually used in an aquarium because they feed primarily on algae, thus cleaning the aquarium of it when present in sufficient numbers. Caridina multidentata was previously known to aquarists as Caridina japonica but was renamed Caridina multidentata following a study in 2006.
