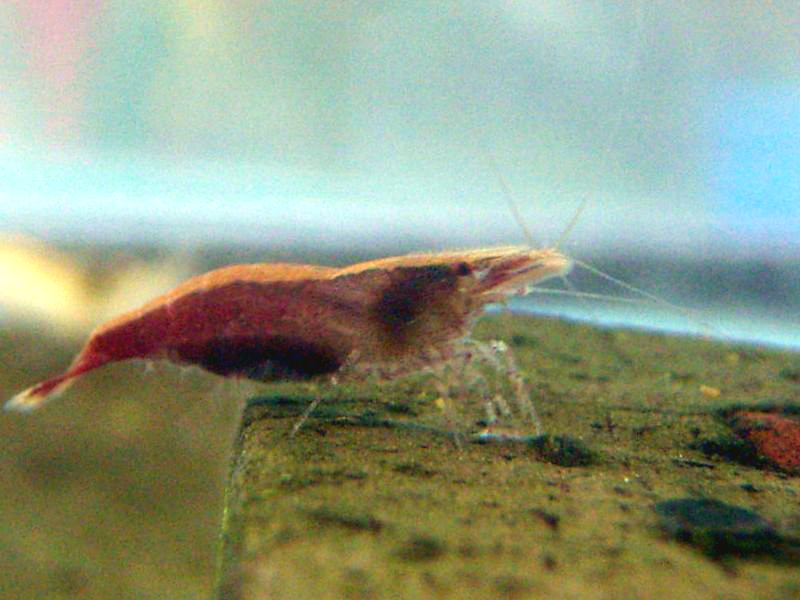

Conservation status
- Least Concern (IUCN 3.1)

Scientific classification
- Kingdom: Animalia
- Phylum: Arthropoda
- Class: Malacostraca
- Order: Decapoda
- Suborder: Pleocyemata
- Infraorder: Caridea
- Family: Atyidae
- Genus: Caridina
- Species: C. serratirostris

Binomial name
- Caridina serratirostris De Man, 1892

= Caridina serratirostris =

Species of crustacean

Caridina serratirostris is a species of freshwater shrimp that lives in the Indo-west Pacific region, from Madagascar to Fiji, including northern Queensland, Australia, which may be a different subspecies. Its common name in the aquarium trade, "ninja shrimp", comes from its ability to quickly change colour and disappear into its surroundings like a ninja. Adults grow to a length of 25–35 millimetres (1.0–1.4 in).
