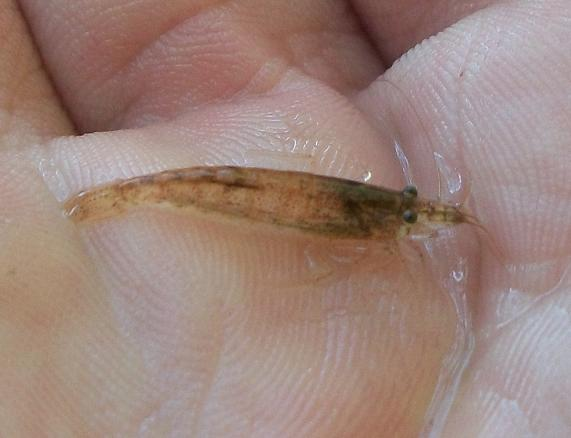

Conservation status
- Least Concern (IUCN 3.1)

Scientific classification
- Kingdom: Animalia
- Phylum: Arthropoda
- Clade: Pancrustacea
- Class: Malacostraca
- Order: Decapoda
- Suborder: Pleocyemata
- Infraorder: Caridea
- Family: Atyidae
- Genus: Caridina
- Species: C. nilotica

Binomial name
- Caridina nilotica (P. Roux, 1833)

Synonyms
- Pelias niloticus P. Roux, 1833

= Caridina nilotica =

Species of crustacean

Caridina nilotica is a species of freshwater shrimp in the family Atyidae. It is native to Africa from the River Nile in Egypt to Lake Sibaya, South Africa, and is the only species of shrimp in Lake Victoria.
