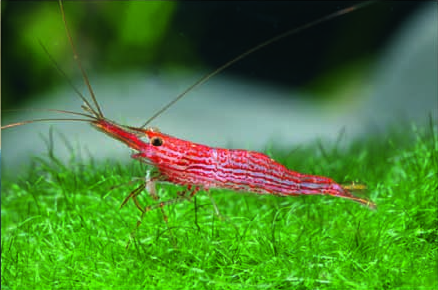

Conservation status
- Critically Endangered (IUCN 3.1)

Scientific classification
- Kingdom: Animalia
- Phylum: Arthropoda
- Class: Malacostraca
- Order: Decapoda
- Suborder: Pleocyemata
- Infraorder: Caridea
- Family: Atyidae
- Genus: Caridina
- Species: C. striata

Binomial name
- Caridina striata von Rintelen & Cai, 2009

= Caridina striata =

Species of crustacean

Caridina striata is a freshwater shrimp from Sulawesi. It is endemic to Lake Poso and Lake Towuti. Common names in the aquarium hobby are red line shrimp and red stripe shrimp. It is commonly found on rocky substrates.

== Threats ==
It is currently under threat by introduced species like the flowerhorn cichlid, organic pollution by the human activities and pollution caused by a nickel mine.
