= Caridina spinata =

Conservation status
- Critically Endangered (IUCN 3.1)

Scientific classification
- Kingdom: Animalia
- Phylum: Arthropoda
- Class: Malacostraca
- Order: Decapoda
- Suborder: Pleocyemata
- Infraorder: Caridea
- Family: Atyidae
- Genus: Caridina
- Species: C. spinata

Binomial name
- Caridina spinata Woltereck, 1937

Species of crustacean

Caridina spinata, also known as the yellow goldflake shrimp, is a freshwater shrimp native to Sulawesi. It is endemic to Lake Towuti. It lives on rocky substrates and adults prefer waters at depths of 3 - 5 meters deep .

== Threats ==
Caridina spinata, alongside many other Caridina species are severely under threat by introduced species such as the flowerhorn cichlid (Colossoma sp.), which is an invasive species in some Malili lakes. Caridina species serve as a food source for the invasive flowerhorn cichlids. Flowerhorn cichlids previously colonized Lake Matano, which had a detrimental effect on the native populations of Cardinia species. Although C. spinata is not native to Lake Matano it is predicted that if flowerhorn cichlids reach Lake Towuti it will have a devastating effect on C. spinata.

Caridina spinata is an attractive shrimp species, therefore heavily harvested from the wild for the aquarium trade. Wild collection of this species has been increasing, which is believed to be aiding population decline.

Pollution by the human activities such as nickel mining also threatens the habitat of Caridina spinata.
