= Takashi Amano =

Photographer and aquarist

Takashi Amano (天野尚)
- Born: July 18, 1954; Maki, Nishikanbara, Niigata, Japan
- Died: August 4, 2015 (aged 61); Niigata, Japan
- Known for: Photographer, aquarist
- Awards: Fuji Film Nature Photo Contest, Grand Prix, 1992

Takashi Amano (天野尚, Amano Takashi; 18 July 1954 – 4 August 2015) was a professional Japanese track cyclist, photographer, designer, and aquarist. He founded Aqua Design Amano (ADA), a Japanese company that specializes in the design of aquariums and their production.

Amano was the author of Nature Aquarium World (TFH Publications, 1994), a three-book series on aquascaping, freshwater aquarium plants, and fish. He also published the book Aquarium Plant Paradise (TFH Publications, 1997).

A species of freshwater shrimp, the "Amano shrimp" or "Yamato shrimp" (Caridina multidentata; previously Caridina japonica), was named after him. Amano discovered the species' ability to eat large quantities of algae. Amano ordered several thousand of them from a local distributor. They have since become widely used in freshwater planted aquariums.

Amano also developed a line of aquarium products under the Aqua Design Amano (ADA) brand. His aquarium column, "Nature Aquarium," appeared in the monthly magazines Practical Fishkeeping and Tropical Fish Hobbyist. He died of pneumonia in 2015 at the age of 61.

== Aquarist ==
His plant layouts incorporated Japanese gardening concepts such as Wabi-sabi and Zen rock arrangements. Amano frequently used Glossostigma elatinoides and Riccia fluitans as plant material.

He founded Aqua Design Amano Co., Ltd. in 1982, which provided aquatic plant-growing equipment. His photo books of what he called the "Nature Aquarium", Glass no Naka no Daishizen, published in 1992, followed by Mizu-Shizen eno kaiki, were translated into seven languages.

=== Amano shrimp ===
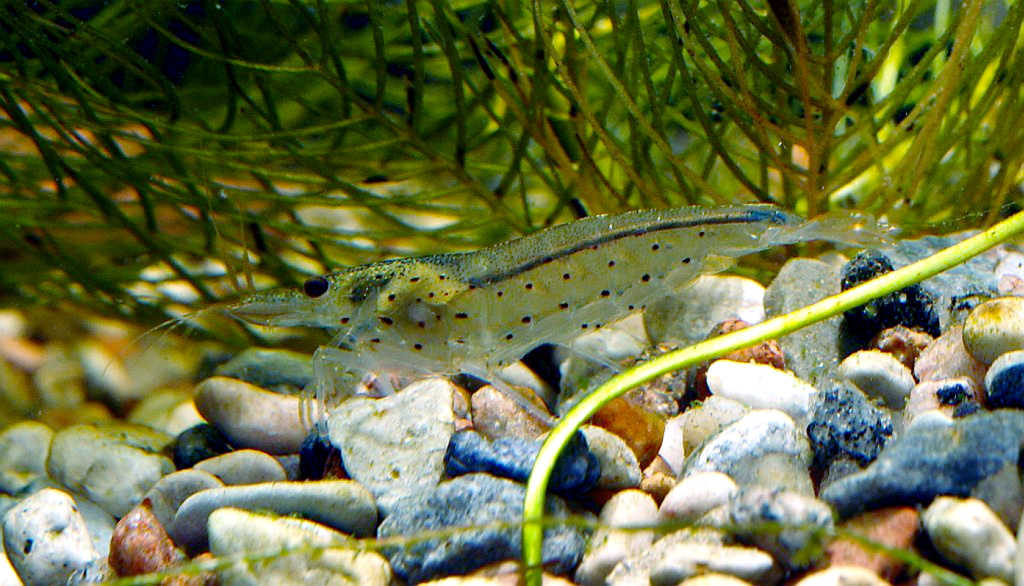
Amano shrimp (Caridina multidentata)

The Amano shrimp (Caridina multidentata) was introduced to the aquatic hobby by Takashi Amano as a method of controlling algae growth in the 1980s. The species was subsequently named after him.

=== "Forests Underwater" at Lisbon Oceanarium ===
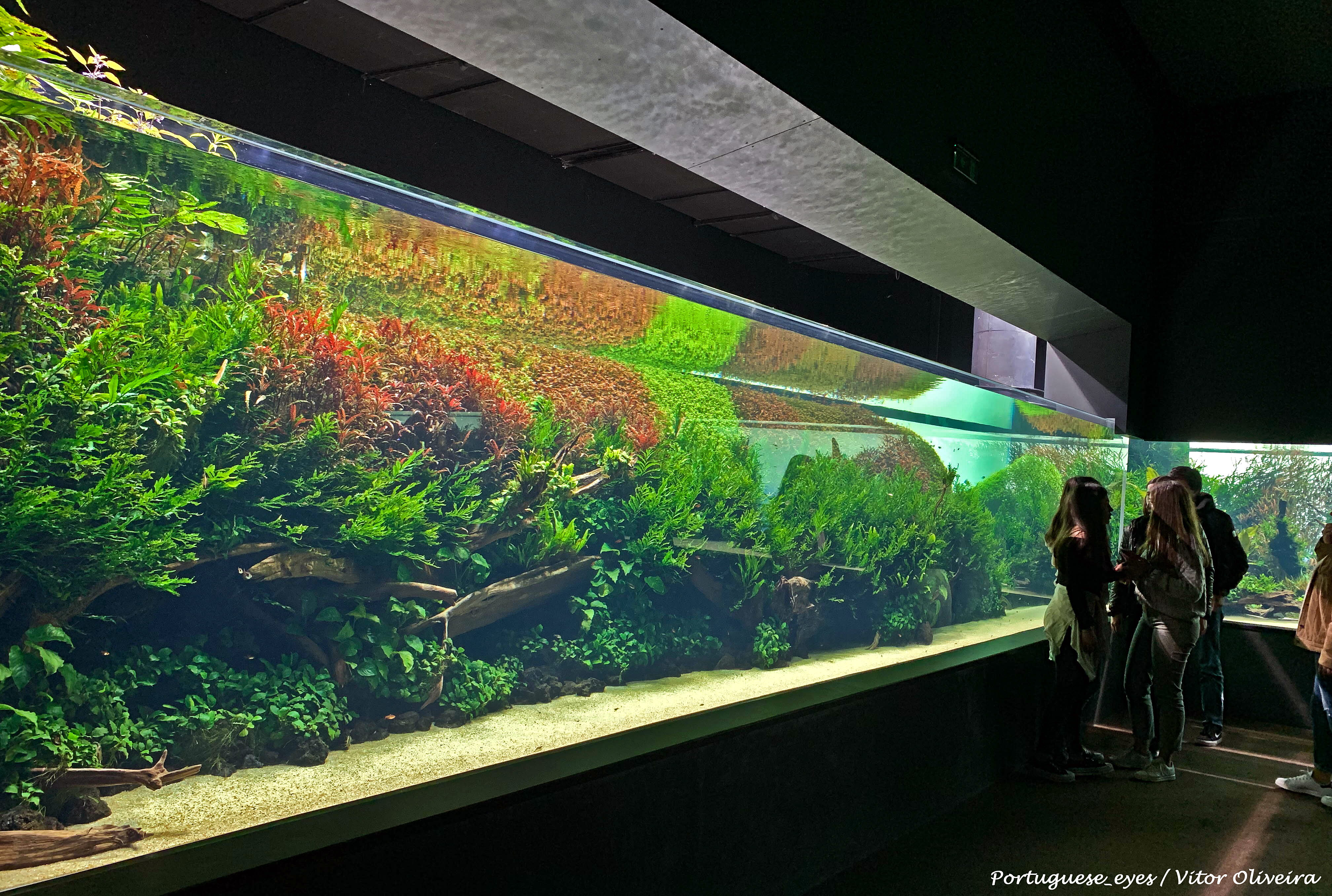
Forests Underwater by Takashi Amano at the Lisbon Oceanarium

"Forests Underwater" by Takashi Amano is a tropical freshwater aquarium at the Lisbon Oceanarium that features a diverse underwater landscape. The aquarium is 40 metres (130 ft) in length and holds 160,000 litres (35,000 imp gal; 42,000 US gal) of water, and houses more than 10,000 individual fish of 40 different species. The exhibit opened on April 21, 2015, although it was initially intended to be a temporary exhibition lasting two years, "Forests Underwater" remained open for 11 years, closing on September 30, 2026.

== Photography career ==
Starting in 1975, Takashi Amano travelled across tropical rainforests in the Amazon, Borneo, and West Africa. He also visited forests in Japan, creating a series of photos focusing on "untouched nature" using large-format cameras. He used extra-large-films with sizes (up to 8 × 20 inches). His works have been featured internationally at several exhibitions and publications.

Amano gave lectures on his photographic expeditions and his experiences in nature around the world, and he advocated for the environmental importance of tree planting programs to support environmental conservation. He was a member of the Japan Professional Photographers Society, the Japan Advertising Photographers' Association, the International Environment Photographers Association, and the Society of Scientific Photography.

=== G8 Hokkaido Tōyako Summit ===
Two of Takashi Amano's landscape photos, featuring a cedar forest on Sado Island, were displayed at the 34th G8 Summit Working Lunch/Outreach Working Session. The photos, taken with an 8 × 20-inch large format camera, were exhibited on 4 × 1.5 meter panels.

== Bibliography ==
Year	Title	Publisher	Country	ISBN
1992	Glass no Naka no Daishizen	Marine Planning	Japan	
1994	Mizu-Shizen eno Kaiki	Marine Planning	Japan	
	Nature Aquarium World	TFH Publications	U.S.A.	
	Pflanzenparadies unter Wasser	Natur Buch Verlag	Germany	
1996	Nature Aquarium World Book 2	TFH Publications	U.S.A.	
	Nature Aquarium World Book 3	TFH Publications	U.S.A.	
	De wonderlijke wereld onder water	Natur Design Verlag	Netherlands	
	Faszinierendes Aquarium	Natur Buch Verlag	Germany	
	Le Nouveau Monde des Plantes Aquatiques	Natur Design Verlag	France	
1997	Aquarium Plant Paradises	TFH Publications	U.S.A.	978-0793805181
	Amanos Naturaquarien	Editoriale Giorgio Mondadori	Italy	
1998	Ihr Hobby-Naturaquarien	Natur Buch Verlag	Germany	
	Diskus im Naturaquarium	Natur Buch Verlag	Germany	
	Das Große Buch der Naturaquarien	Natur Buch Verlag	Germany	
	Les aquariums naturels d'Amano	JEH Productions	France	
2004	The Rio Negro	Marine Planning	Japan	
2007	Sado – To Pristine Forest From Bottom of Sea	ADA	Japan	
2009	Sado – To Pristine Forest From Bottom of Sea "Revised and Enlarged Edition"	ADA	Japan	
2011	Nature Aquarium: Complete Works 1985–2009	TFH Publications	U.S.A	978-0793806492

== Exhibitions ==
Year	Title	Location	Country
1998	Urin-Ujou	Fuji Photo Salon, Tokyo	Japan
2004	Dare mo Shiranai Amazon	Niitsu Art Forum, Niigata	Japan
	The Rio Negro	Nizayama Forest Art Museum, Toyama	Japan
2006	The Rio Negro	Nature Info Plaza—Marunouchi Saezurikan, Tokyo	Japan
	Sozo no Genten Amazon	Toki Messe, Niigata	Japan
	Kusatsu-Amazon	Niigata Daiwa, Niigata	Japan
2007	Sado-From bottom of the Sea to the Pristine Forest	Tokyo Metropolitan Museum of Photography	Japan
	Daremo Shiranai Sado	Niigata Prefectural Civic Center	Japan
2008	Daremo Shiranai Sado	Amusement Sado, Niigata	Japan
2009	Sado – a Natural Treasure of Japan	Qatar Photography Society, Doha	Qatar
2009	Takashi Amano in India for Aquatika 2009	Nimhans Convention Hall, Bangalore	India
2015	Forests Underwater	Oceanário de Lisboa, Lisbon	Portugal
