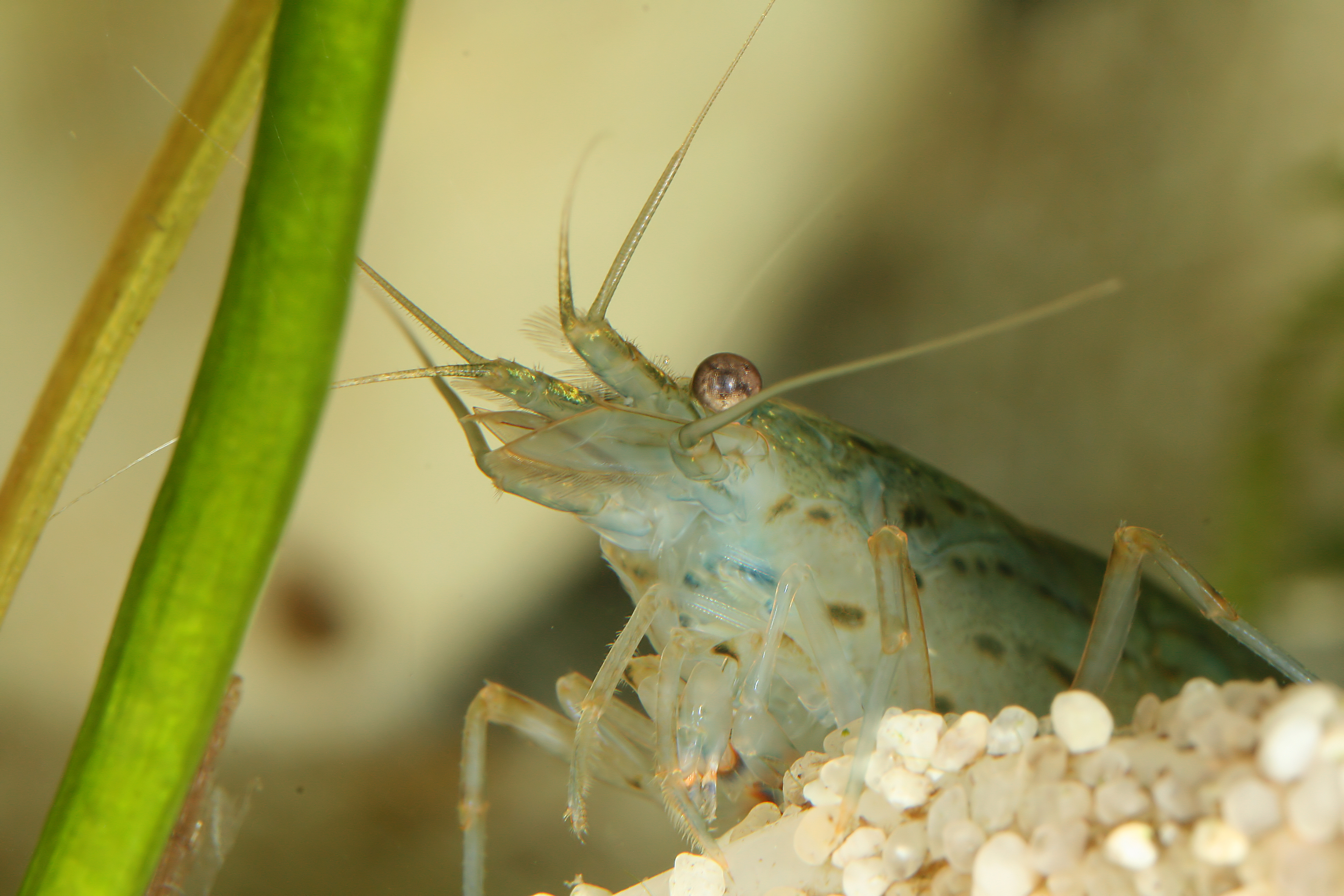
- Caridina multidentata

Scientific classification
- Kingdom: Animalia
- Phylum: Arthropoda
- Clade: Pancrustacea
- Class: Malacostraca
- Order: Decapoda
- Suborder: Pleocyemata
- Infraorder: Caridea
- Family: Atyidae
- Genus: Caridina; H. Milne-Edwards, 1837

Species
- Around 340, see text

= Caridina =

Genus of crustaceans

Caridina is a genus of freshwater shrimp that belongs to the family Atyidae. They are widely found in tropical or subtropical water in Asia, Oceania and Africa.

== Description ==
They range from 0.9 to 9.8 mm (C. cantonensis) to 1.2–7.4 mm (C. serrata) in carapace length.

== Behavior ==
They are filter-feeders and omnivorous scavengers.

== Taxonomy ==
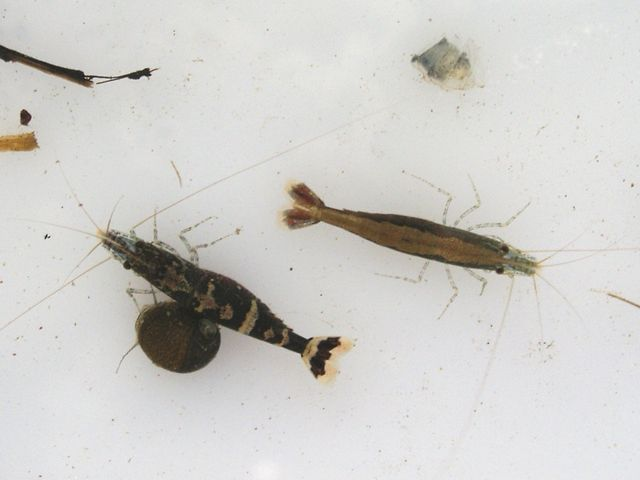
Caridina serratirostris, a widespread freshwater species from the Indo-Pacific region

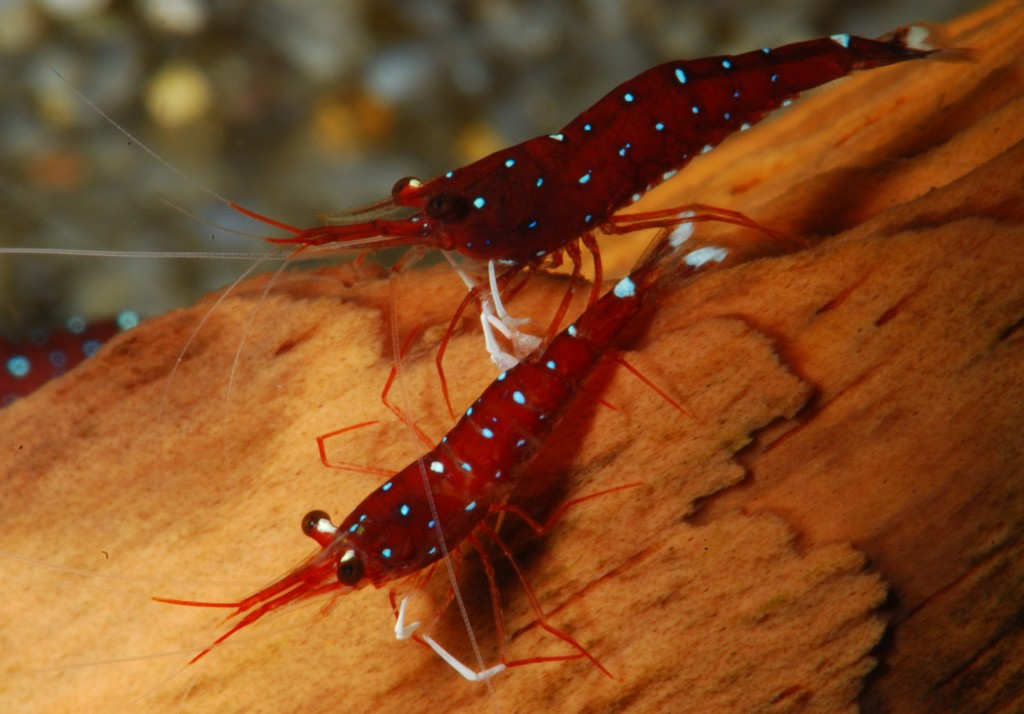
Caridina dennerli, one of several species restricted to the Indonesian island of Sulawesi

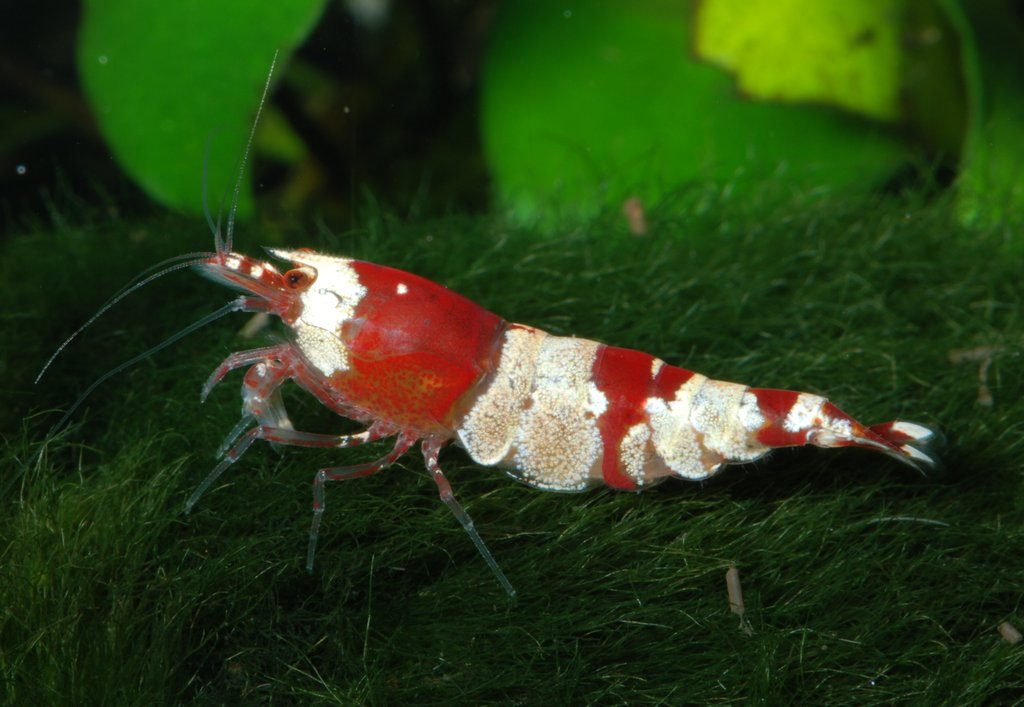
Caridina cantonensis is widely kept in aquariums and several color forms have been achieved through selective breeding

There is evidence for hybridization between sympatric taxa, requiring care when interpreting molecular phylogenetic analyses that do not use a large number of specimens.

=== Species ===
As of March 2022, the Integrated Taxonomic Information System lists the genus Caridina as having about 340 species. These include the following species:

- Caridina ablepsia Guo, Jiang & Zhang, 1992
- Caridina acuta Liang, Chen & W.-X. Li, 2005
- Caridina acutirostris Schenkel, 1902
- Caridina africana Kingsley, 1883
- Caridina alba J. Li & S. Li, 2010
- Caridina alphonsi Bouvier, 1919
- Caridina amnicolizambezi Richard & Clark, 2009
- Caridina amoyensis Liang & Yan, 1977
- Caridina angulata Bouvier, 1905
- Caridina angustipes Guo & Liang, 2003
- Caridina anislaq Cai, Choy & Ng, 2009
- Caridina annandalei Kemp, 1918
- Caridina apodosis Cai & N. K. Ng, 1999
- Caridina appendiculata Jalihal & Shenoy, 1998
- Caridina aruensis Roux, 1911
- Caridina bakoensis Ng, 1995
- Caridina bamaensis Liang & Yan, 1983
- Caridina baojingensis Guo, He & Bai, 1992
- Caridina barakoma de Mazancourt et al. 2020
- Caridina batuan Cai, Choy & Ng, 2009
- Caridina belazoniensis Richard & Clark, 2009
- Caridina boehmei Klotz & von Rintelen, 2013
- Caridina boholensis Cai, Choy & Ng, 2009
- Caridina brachydactyla De Man, 1908
- Caridina brevidactyla Roux, 1919
- Caridina breviata N. K. Ng & Cai, 2000
- Caridina brevicarpalis De Man, 1892
- Caridina brevispina Liang & Yan, 1986
- Caridina bruneiana Choy, 1992
- Caridina buehleri Roux, 1934
- Caridina buergersi Karge, von Rintelen & Klotz, 2010
- Caridina buhi Cai & Shokita, 2006
- Caridina bunyonyiensis Richard & Clark, 2005
- Caridina burmensis Cai & Ng, 2000
- Caridina butonensis Klotz & von Rintelen, 2013
- Caridina caerulea von Rintelen & Cai, 2009
- Caridina calmani Bouvier, 1919
- Caridina camaro Cai, Choy & Ng, 2009
- Caridina cantonensis Yü, 1938
- Caridina caobangensis S.-Q. Li & Liang, 2002
- Caridina carli Roux, 1931
- Caridina cavalerieioides Liu & Liang in Liang, 2004
- Caridina caverna Liang, Chen & W.-X. Li, 2005
- Caridina cavernicola Liang & Zhou, 1993
- Caridina cebuensis Cai & Shokita, 2006
- Caridina celebensis De Man, 1892
- Caridina celestinoi Blanco, 1939
- Caridina chauhani Chopra & Tiwari, 1949
- Caridina choiseul de Mazancourt et al. 2020
- Caridina chishuiensis Cai & Yuan, 1996
- Caridina clandestina Klotz et al., 2023
- Caridina clavipes Guo & Liang, 2003
- Caridina clinata Cai, X. Q. Nguyên & Ng, 1999
- Caridina cognata De Man, 1915
- Caridina confusa Choy & Marshall, 1997
- Caridina congoensis Richard & Clark, 2009
- Caridina cornuta Liang & Yan, 1986
- Caridina costai de Silva, 1982
- Caridina crassipes Liang, 1993
- Caridina crurispinata Gurney, 1984
- Caridina cucphuongensis Đăng, 1980
- Caridina curta Liang & Cai, 2000
- Caridina demani Roux, 1911
- Caridina demenica Cai & Li, 1997
- Caridina dennerli von Rintelen & Cai, 2009 *Caridina davidi Bouvier, 1904
- Caridina denticulata
- Caridina dentifrons N. K. Ng & Cai, 2000
- Caridina devaneyi Choy, 1991
- Caridina dianchiensis Liang & Yan, 1985
- Caridina disjuncta Cai & Liang, 1999
- Caridina disparidentata Liang, Yan & Wang, 1984
- Caridina ebuneus Richard & Clark, 2009
- Caridina edulis Bouvier, 1904
- Caridina elisabethae Karge, von Rintelen & Klotz, 2010
- Caridina elliptica Cai & Yuan, 1996
- Caridina elongapoda Liang & Yan, 1977
- Caridina endehensis De Man, 1892
- Caridina ensifera Schenkel, 1902
- Caridina evae Richard & Clark, 2009
- Caridina excavata Kemp, 1913
- Caridina excavatoides Johnson, 1961
- Caridina fasciata Hung, Chan & Yu, 1993
- Caridina fecunda Roux, 1911
- Caridina feixiana Cai & Liang, 1999
- Caridina fernandoi Arudpragasam & Costa, 1962
- Caridina fijiana Choy, 1983
- Caridina flavilineata Đăng, 1975
- Caridina formosae Hung, Chan & Yu, 1993
- Caridina fossarum Heller, 1862
- Caridina fusca Klotz, Wowor & von Rintelen, 2021
- Caridina gabonensis Roux, 1927
- Caridina ghanensis Richard & Clark, 2009
- Caridina glaubrechti von Rintelen & Cai, 2009
- Caridina glossopoda Liang, Guo & Gao, 1993
- Caridina gordonae Richard & Clark, 2005
- Caridina gortio Cai & Anker, 2004
- Caridina gracilipes De Man, 1892
- Caridina gracilirostris De Man, 1892
- Caridina gracillima Lanchester, 1901
- Caridina grandirostris Stimpson, 1860
- Caridina guangxiensis Liang & Zhou, 1993
- Caridina gueryi Marquet, Keith & Kalfatak, 2009
- Caridina guiyangensis Liang, 2002
- Caridina gurneyi Jalihal, Shenoy & Sankolli, 1984
- Caridina hainanensis Liang & Yan, 1983
- Caridina hanshanensis Tan, 1990
- Caridina harmandi Bouvier, 1906
- Caridina hodgarti Kemp, 1913
- Caridina holthuisi von Rintelen & Cai, 2009
- Caridina hongyanensis Cai & Yuan, 1996
- Caridina hova Nobili, 1905
- Caridina huananensis Liang, 2004
- Caridina hubeiensis Liang & S.-Q. Li, 1993
- Caridina hunanensis Liang, Guo & Gao, 1993
- Caridina imitatrix Holthuis, 1970
- Caridina intermedia de Mazancourt et al. 2020
- Caridina jalihali Mariappan & Richard, 2006
- Caridina jeani Cai, 2010
- Caridina jiangxiensis Liang & Zheng, 1985
- Caridina johnsoni Cai, Ng & Choy, 2007
- Caridina kaombeflutilis Richard & Clark, 2010
- Caridina kempi Jalihal, Shenoy & Sankolli, 1984
- Caridina kilimae Hilgendorf, 1898
- Caridina kunmingensis Z.-Z. Wang & Liang, 2001
- Caridina kunnathurensis Richard & Chandran, 1994
- Caridina laevis Heller, 1862
- Caridina lamiana Holthuis, 1965
- Caridina lanceifrons Yu, 1936
- Caridina lanceolata Woltereck, 1937
- Caridina lanzana Holthuis, 1980
- Caridina laoagensis Blanco, 1939
- Caridina laroeha Klotz & von Rintelen, 2013
- Caridina leclerci Cai & Ng, 2009
- Caridina leucosticta Stimpson, 1860
- Caridina leytensis Blanco, 1939
- Caridina liangi Jiang, Guo & Zhang, 2002
- Caridina liaoi Cai, Choy & Ng, 2009
- Caridina lilianae Klotz, Wowor & von Rintelen, 2021
- Caridina lima Liang, Guo & Gao, 1993
- Caridina linduensis Roux, 1904
- Caridina lineorostris Richard & Clark, 2009
- Caridina lingkonae Woltereck, 1937
- Caridina lipalmaria Richard & Clark, 2010
- Caridina liui Liang & Yan, 1986
- Caridina lobocensis Cai, Choy & Ng, 2009
- Caridina loehae Woltereck, 1937
- Caridina longa Liang & Yan, 1985
- Caridina longiacuta Guo & Wang, 2005
- Caridina longicarpus Roux, 1926
- Caridina longidigita Cai & Wowor, 2007
- Caridina longifrons Cai & Ng, 2007
- Caridina longirostris H. Milne-Edwards, 1837
- Caridina lovoensis Roth-Woltereck, 1955
- Caridina lufengensis Cai & Duan, 1998
- Caridina lumilympha Richard & Clark, 2010
- Caridina macrodentata Cai & Shokita, 2006
- Caridina macrophora Kemp, 1918
- Caridina maculata L. Wang, Liang & F. Li, 2008
- Caridina maeana de Mazancourt et al. 2020
- Caridina maeklongensis Macharoenboon, K., Manonai, V., & Jeratthitikul, E., 2024
- Caridina mahalona Cai, Wowor & Choy, 2009
- Caridina malawensis Richard & Clark, 2009
- Caridina malayensis Cai, Ng & Choy, 2007
- Caridina mariae Klotz & von Rintelen, 2014
- Caridina marlenae Klotz, Wowor & von Rintelen, 2021
- Caridina masapi Woltereck, 1937
- Caridina mathiassi Silas & Jayachandran, 2010
- Caridina mauritii Bouvier, 1912
- Caridina mayamareenae Klotz, Wowor & von Rintelen, 2021
- Caridina mccullochi Roux, 1926
- Caridina medifolia Cai & Yuan, 1996
- Caridina mengae Liang, 1993
- Caridina mengaeoides Guo & Suzuki, 1996
- Caridina menghaiensis Cai & Dai, 1999
- Caridina meridionalis L. Wang, Liang & F. Li, 2008
- Caridina mertoni Roux, 1911
- Caridina mesofluminis Richard & Clark, 2009
- Caridina mindanao Cai & Shokita, 2006
- Caridina minidentata Cai & Anker, 2004
- Caridina minnanica Liang, 2002
- Caridina modiglianii Nobili, 1900
- Caridina moeri Roth-Woltereck, 1984
- Caridina mongziensis Liang, Yan & Z.-Z. Wang, 1987
- Caridina multidentata Stimpson, 1860
- Caridina nana de Mazancourt et al. 2020
- Caridina nanaoensis Cai & N. K. Ng, 1999
- Caridina natalensis Bouvier, 1925
- Caridina natarajani Tiwari & R. S. Pillai, 1968
- Caridina neglecta Cai & Ng, 2007
- Caridina nguyeni S.-Q. Li & Liang, 2002
- Caridina nilotica (Roux, 1833)
- Caridina norvestica Holthuis, 1965
- Caridina novaecaledoniae Roux, 1926
- Caridina nudirostris Choy, 1984
- Caridina okiamnis Richard & Clark, 2009
- Caridina okinawa Cai & Shokita, 2006
- Caridina oligospina Liang, Guo & Tang, 1999
- Caridina opaensis Roux, 1904
- Caridina palawanensis Cai & Shokita, 2006
- Caridina panikkari Jalihal, Shenoy & Sankolli, 1984
- Caridina papuana Nobili, 1905
- Caridina paracornuta Cai & Yuan, 1996
- Caridina pareparensis De Man, 1892
- Caridina paratypus de Mazancourt et al. 2020
- Caridina parvidentata Roux, 1904
- Caridina parvirostris De Man, 1892
- Caridina parvocula Gurney, 1984
- Caridina parvula von Rintelen & Cai, 2009
- Caridina paucidentata Wang & Liang, 2005
- Caridina paucidentata L.-Q. Wang & Liang, 2005
- Caridina pedicultrata Guo & Choy, 1994
- Caridina peninsularis Kemp, 1918
- Caridina petiti Roux, 1929
- Caridina pingi Yü, 1938
- Caridina pingioides Yü, 1938
- Caridina piokerai de Mazancourt et al. 2020
- Caridina pisuku de Mazancourt et al. 2020
- Caridina plicata Liang, 2004
- Caridina poarae de Mazancourt et al. 2020
- Caridina poso Klotz, Wowor & von Rintelen, 2021
- Caridina prashadi Tiwari & R. S. Pillai, 1971
- Caridina pristis Roux, 1931
- Caridina profundicola von Rintelen & Cai, 2009
- Caridina propinqua De Man, 1908
- Caridina pseudodenticulata Hung, Chan & Yu, 1993
- Caridina pseudonilotica Richard & Clark, 2005
- Caridina pseudoserrata Đăng & Ðỗ, 2007
- Caridina qingyuanensis Guo & He, 2007
- Caridina rajadhari Bouvier, 1918
- Caridina rangoona Cai & Ng, 2000
- Caridina rapaensis Edmondson, 1935
- Caridina richtersi Thallwitz, 1892
- Caridina roubaudi Bouvier, 1925
- Caridina rouxi De Man, 1915
- Caridina rubella Fujino & Shokita, 1975
- Caridina rubropunctata Đăng & Ðỗ, 2007
- Caridina samar Cai & Anker, 2004
- Caridina sarasinorum Schenkel, 1902
- Caridina schenkeli von Rintelen & Cai, 2009
- Caridina semiblepsia Guo, Choy & Gui, 1996
- Caridina serrata Stimpson, 1860
- Caridina serratirostris De Man, 1892
- Caridina shenoyi Jalihal & Sankolli in Jalihal, Shenoy & Sankolli, 1984
- Caridina sikipozo de Mazancourt et al. 2020
- Caridina shilinica Liang & Cai, 2000
- Caridina similis Bouvier, 1904
- Caridina simoni Bouvier, 1904
- Caridina sinanensis Xu, Li, Zheng & Guo, 2020
- Caridina sodenensis Richard & Clark, 2009
- Caridina solearipes Guo & De Grave, 1997
- Caridina songtaoensis Liang, 2004
- Caridina spathulirostris Richters, 1880
- Caridina spelunca Choy, 1996
- Caridina sphyrapoda Liang & Zhou, 1993
- Caridina spinalifrons Guo & De Grave, 1997
- Caridina spinata Woltereck, 1937
- Caridina spinipoda Liang, Hong & Yang, 1990
- Caridina spinosipes Liang, Guo & Tang, 1999
- Caridina spinula Choy & Marshall, 1997
- Caridina spongicola Zitzler & Cai, 2006
- Caridina steineri Cai, 2005
- Caridina striata von Rintelen & Cai, 2009
- Caridina subventralis Richard & Clark, 2005
- Caridina sulawesi Cai & Ng, 2009
- Caridina sumatianica Cai & Yuan, 1996
- Caridina sumatrensis De Man, 1892
- Caridina sundanella Holthuis, 1978
- Caridina susuruflabra Richard & Clark, 2009
- Caridina temasek Choy & Ng, 1991
- Caridina tenuirostris Woltereck, 1937
- Caridina tetrazona Chen, Chen, & Guo, 2020
- Caridina thambipillai Johnson, 1961
- Caridina thermophila Riek, 1953
- Caridina thomasi von Rintelen, Karge & Klotz, 2008
- Caridina timorensis De Man, 1893
- Caridina togoensis Hilgendorf, 1893
- Caridina tonggulinensis Zhang et al., 2026
- Caridina tonkinensis Bouvier, 1919
- Caridina trifasciata Yam & Cai, 2003
- Caridina troglodytes Holthuis, 1978
- Caridina troglophila Holthuis, 1965
- Caridina tumida L. Wang, Liang & F. Li, 2008
- Caridina tupaia de Mazancourt, Marquet & Keith, 2019
- Caridina turipi de Mazancourt et al. 2020
- Caridina typus H. Milne-Edwards, 1837
- Caridina uminensis Đăng & Ðỗ, 2007
- Caridina umtatensis Richard & Clark, 2009
- Caridina unca Gurney, 1984
- Caridina valencia Cai, Choy & Ng, 2009
- Caridina venusta L. Wang, Liang & F. Li, 2008
- Caridina vietriensis Đăng & Ðỗ, 2007
- Caridina villadolidi Blanco, 1939
- Caridina vitiensis Borradaile, 1899
- Caridina weberi De Man, 1892
- Caridina williamsi Cai & Ng, 2000
- Caridina woltereckae Cai, Wowor & Choy, 2009
- Caridina wumingensis Cai & N. K. Ng, 1999
- Caridina wyckii (Hickson, 1888)
- Caridina xiangnanensis X.-Y. Liu, Guo & Yu, 2006
- Caridina xiphias Bouvier, 1925
- Caridina yilong Cai & Liang, 1999
- Caridina yulinica Cai & N. K. Ng, 1999
- Caridina yunnanensis Yü, 1938
- Caridina zebra Short, 1993
- Caridina zeylanica Arudpragasam & Costa, 1962
- Caridina zhaoi Jiang, Zhou & Chen, 2026
- Caridina zhejiangensis Liang & Zheng, 1985
- Caridina zhongshanica Liang, 2004

A number of phylogenetic studies have questioned the monophyly of Caridina.

== Threats and Conservation ==
As of March 2023, the IUCN Red List lists 56 Caridina species as threatened, with 18 listed as critically endangered, 5 listed as endangered, and 33 listed as vulnerable. Of these, two (Caridina apodosis and Caridina yilong) are listed as possibly extinct and one (Caridina dennerli) is listed as possibly extinct in the wild.
