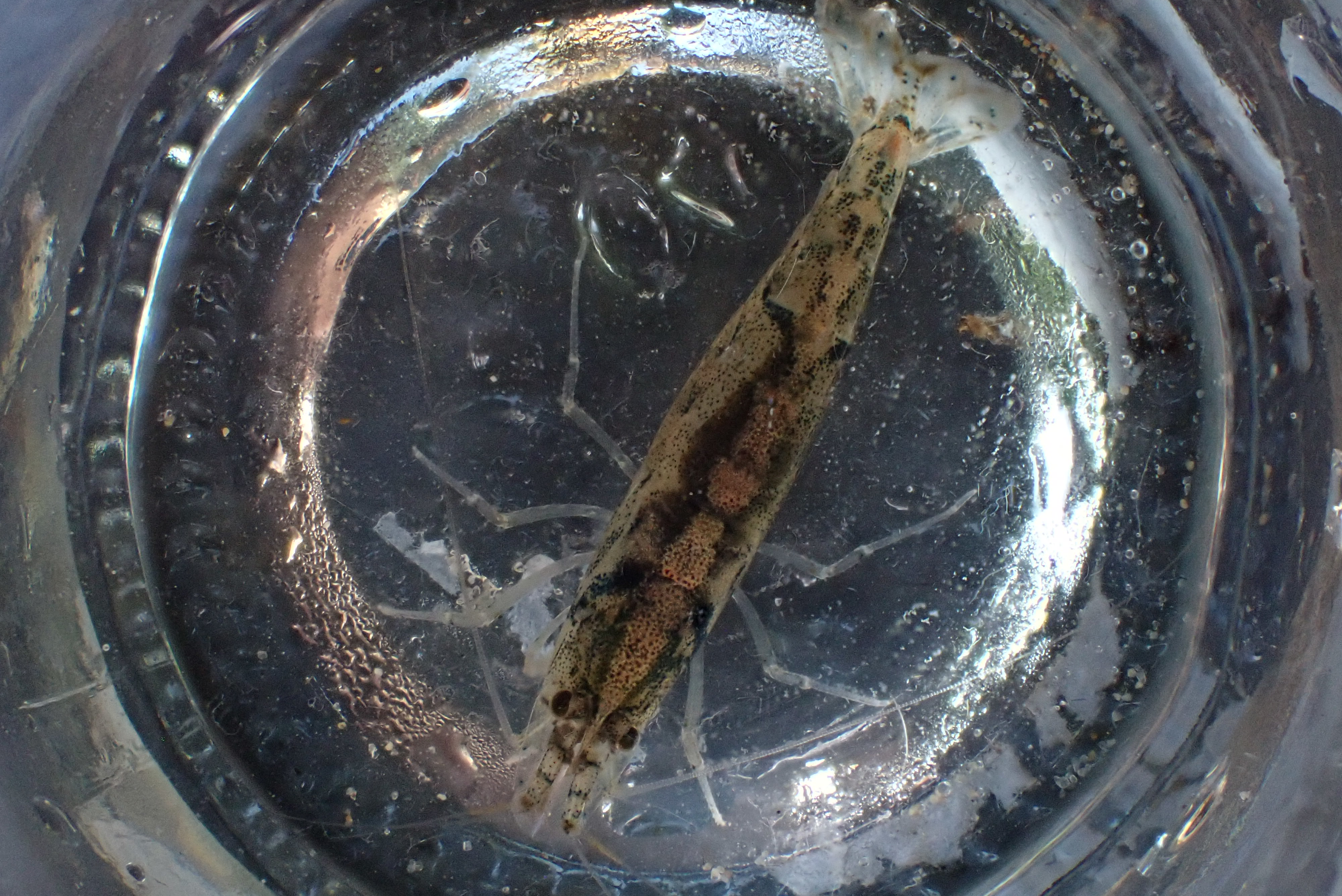

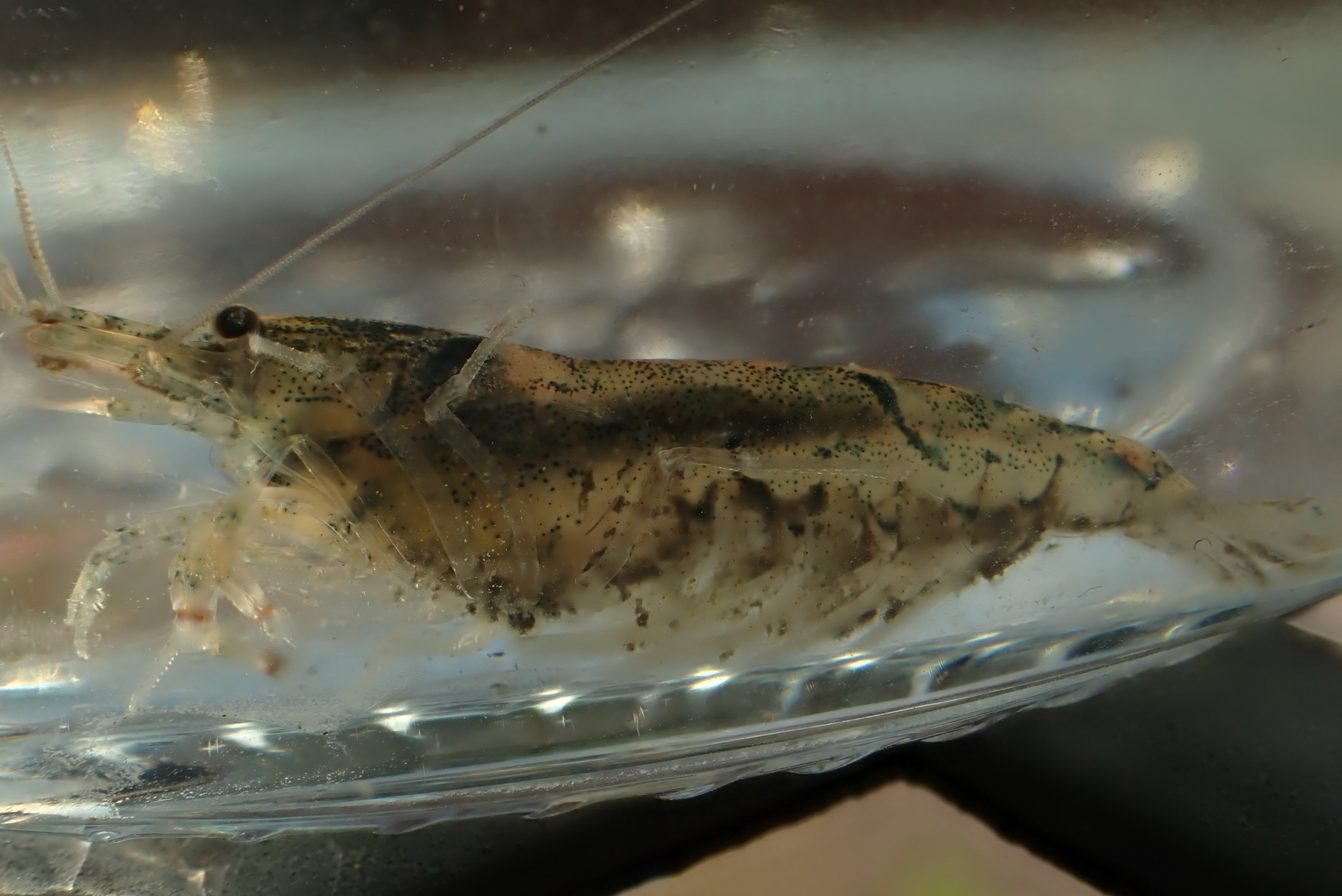

Conservation status
- Least Concern (IUCN 3.1)

Scientific classification
- Kingdom: Animalia
- Phylum: Arthropoda
- Clade: Pancrustacea
- Class: Malacostraca
- Order: Decapoda
- Suborder: Pleocyemata
- Infraorder: Caridea
- Family: Atyidae
- Genus: Caridina
- Species: C. typus

Binomial name
- Caridina typus H. Milne-Edwards, 1837

= Caridina typus =

Species of amphidromous atyid shrimp

Caridina typus, also known as the Australian Amano shrimp, is a species of amphidromous atyid shrimp. It was first described by H. Milne-Edwards in 1837. It has a broad distribution in tropical freshwater habitats in the Indo-West Pacific region, with its western range extending to eastern Africa and its eastern range extending to Polynesia. It is commonly found in rivers and streams in coastal areas or on islands. C. typus is known to play a role in sediment distribution and shredding leaf litter, manipulating the environment using their pereiopods and setaceous chelae. The species is also an important component of the food web, both as scavengers and as prey items, and is considered a keystone species for the stream ecosystems it inhabits. According to Choy and Marshall, the species can be characterized by a "short, dorsally unarmed rostrum, the presence of epipods on the first four pairs of pereiopods, and the presence of an appendix interna on the endopod of the first pleopod of both sexes." It can be kept in captivity by aquarists as pets.

== Description ==
=== Morphology ===
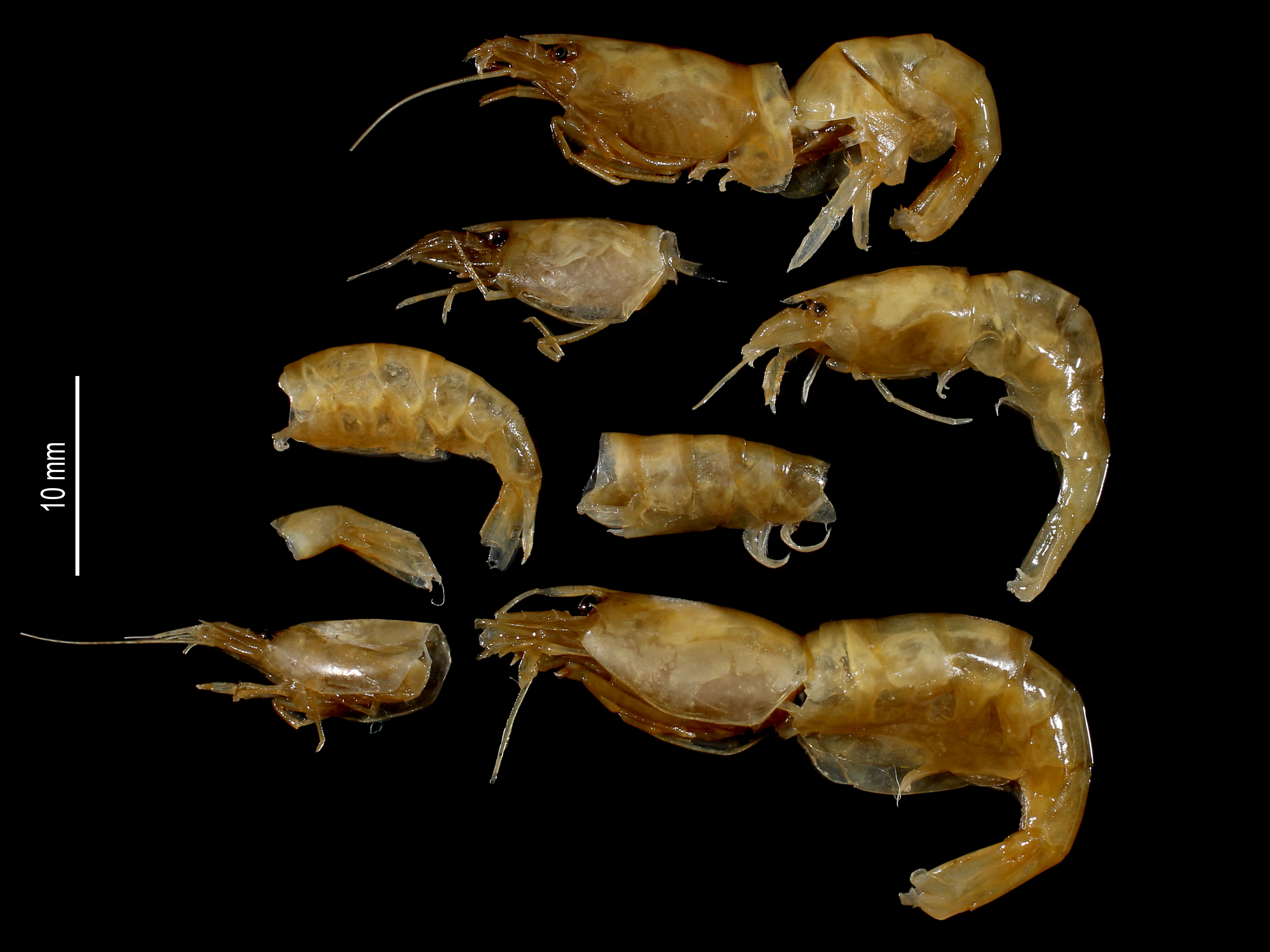
Preserved Caridina typus specimens with tagmata separated.

The adult and larval morphologies of C. typus are similar to those of other Caridina. As an adult, it measures 2.0-2.5 cm in total length, though adult individuals can be smaller or larger than this range. It has two well-developed compound eyes that rest on stalks. It has a variable rostrum length and variable rostrum features. Adults are observed to be armed with anywhere between one and six teeth on their rostrum. However, in a study of C. typus in Pohnpei, adults were observed to lack teeth on the ventral margin of their rostrum.

The carapace length of ovigerous females ranges between 3.9 and 4.2 mm. Adults have a cephalothorax with cephalic appendages, six pleomeres with the sixth being 0.40 times as long as the carapace, a telson 2.8 times as long as wide, 4-5 pairs of dorsal spicules, a uropodal diaeresis with 19-24 spicules, a preanal carina lacking a spine, a slender antennular peduncle 0.7 times as long as the carapace, and similar mouthparts to C. grandirostris.

It possesses five pereiopods, the first four having epipods. The first pereiopod is short with claws present on both fingers, reaching the end of the basal segment of the antennular peduncle; the second pereiopod reaches the end of the second segment of the antennular peduncle, the third pereiopod is long and slender with a strong claw at the end of the dactylus, reaching the end of the antennular peduncle and the fifth pereiopod reaching the end of the scaphocerite.

There are five pleopods. The endopod of a male's first pleopod extends to half the length of the exopod. The second pleopod of a male is slender.

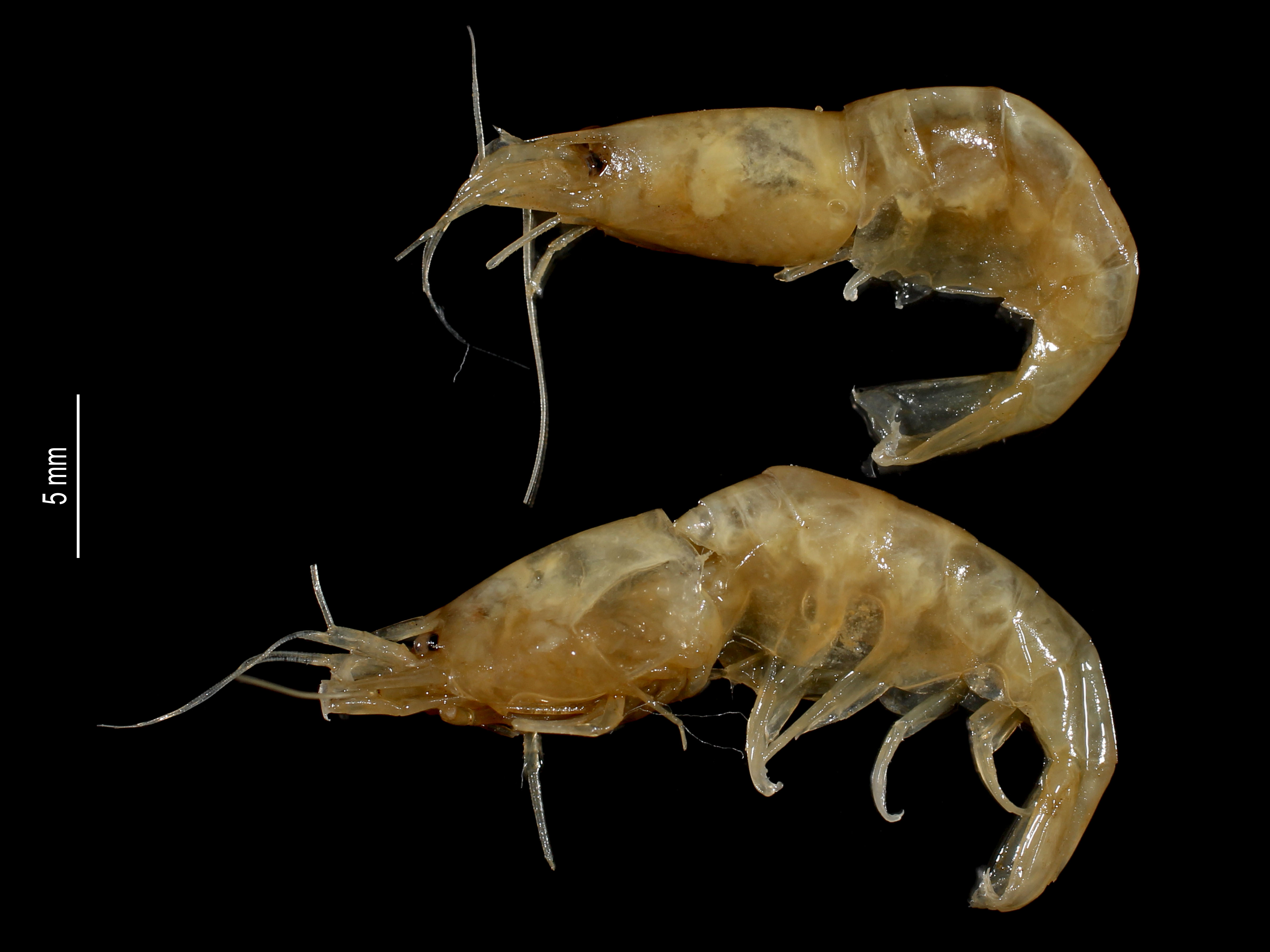
Preserved Caridina typus specimens.

=== Diet ===
Caridina typus larvae can eat a variety of phytoplankton, zooplankton, and fine detritus. Early larvae ingest phytoplankton by means of suspension feeding. The fatty acid content and composition of live food affects the larval survival, growth, and development of C. typus. A captive study observed that C. typus larvae could survive and develop into juveniles when fed only cultured phytoplankton Tetraselmis sp. When fed Tetraselmis mixed with zooplankton rotifers, the survival of larvae improved and larval development velocity increased as compared to a Tetraselmis-only diet. However, a diet with rotifers alone could not sustain larvae, suggesting that early C. typus larvae cannot ingest rotifers, but larvae in middle to late larval stages can. Development of endopods on the thoracic appendages in older C. typus larvae allows the capture and ingestion of lumps of food. A diverse diet and one including rotifers greatly benefits the development of C. typus larvae by increasing survival and the rate of development. If starved, the larvae will not molt and therefore stop developing.

Juveniles and adults will eat primarily algae, leaf litter, and detritus. They are considered scavengers. Adults possess clawed fingers on their first pereiopod, which help the organism grab and feed on discrete particles or invertebrates such as juvenile insects and oligochaetes. Their diet contrasts with other Caridina species lacking clawed fingers, which feed on detritus or periphyton instead. Like other atyid shrimp, C. typus possess hairs and setae on their chelae used for scraping, filtering, and collecting food.

=== Chemoreception ===
Caridina typus uses chemoreception to avoid heterospecific predators and find conspecifics. They can detect chemical cues from conspecifics and heterospecifics and distinguish whether heterospecifics are predatory or non-predatory. They avoid chemical cues from predatory heterospecifics such as the redclaw crayfish Cherax quadricarinatus and barramundi Lates calcarife. C. typus shows no response to non-predatory heterospecific cues such as from Nerite snail Nerita atramentosa, and prefers conspecific cues. Conspecific cues are useful in low visibility conditions to help find mates or to defend a territory from potential competitors.

== Range ==
Caridina typus is widely distributed throughout the Indo-west Pacific, extending from eastern and southern Africa to the Indian Ocean islands, Australia, Polynesia, Southeast Asia, and Japan. It can be found in tropical freshwater rivers and streams. However, they are also highly tolerant to high salinity levels and can often be found near the sea, explaining its wide distribution. C. typus can be found in marine and freshwater environments, but not terrestrial environments. During the day, it hides under rocks and stones and usually comes out to forage at night.

Although it is usually found in the lower regions of rivers and streams, it has been found in altitudes of 300 m above sea level. The spatial distribution of the shrimp is affected by environmental factors such as water velocity, food availability, and predators. The temporal distribution of the shrimp can be affected by their amphidromous life cycle strategy.

== Life cycle and reproduction ==
Caridina typus are amphidromous, meaning that they migrate between freshwater and saltwater for reasons other than breeding. The adults inhabit and reproduce in freshwater environments, but the larvae require saline water to develop. Their breeding season lasts from March to December. Reproduction occurs sexually, with the male passing a spermatophore to the female and the female producing eggs several hours after mating, carrying the eggs under her abdomen for development.

=== Eggs ===
Females can carry large broods of small-sized oval-shaped eggs, each which measure approximately 0.45-0.48 mm x 0.23-0.26 mm in diameter. Broods of over 3000 eggs on average, up to a record 3700, are carried amongst the pleopods of ovigerous females. Brood size varies with body size. Smaller ovigerous females carry fewer eggs. One study observed an ovigerous female 11.7 mm in total orbital length carrying only 126 eggs, but another ovigerous female 34.3 mm in total orbital length carried 3542 eggs.

=== Larvae ===
Between hatching from eggs and becoming an adult, C. typus goes through larval and juvenile stages, all of which are pelagic. Females migrate downstream (to the mouth of a river or stream) or into brackish waters to spawn, using the upstream headwaters (the smallest part of a river or stream) only as a nursery. This has been confirmed observation of ovigerous females in headwaters carrying non-eyed eggs, but ovigerous females downstream having eyed eggs. C. typus larvae recruit to the mouth of a coastal river or stream, emerging after sunset and increasing as darkness progresses. Significantly large numbers of larvae can be found downstream versus upstream.

Caridina typus has nine zoeal instars or stages: a relatively high number of stages compared to other Caridina, which usually have around four zoeal stages. The zoea develop in brackish water, and the first few zoeal stages have a relatively high optimal salinity of 25.5 ppm. Food is taken in during the first zoeal stage.

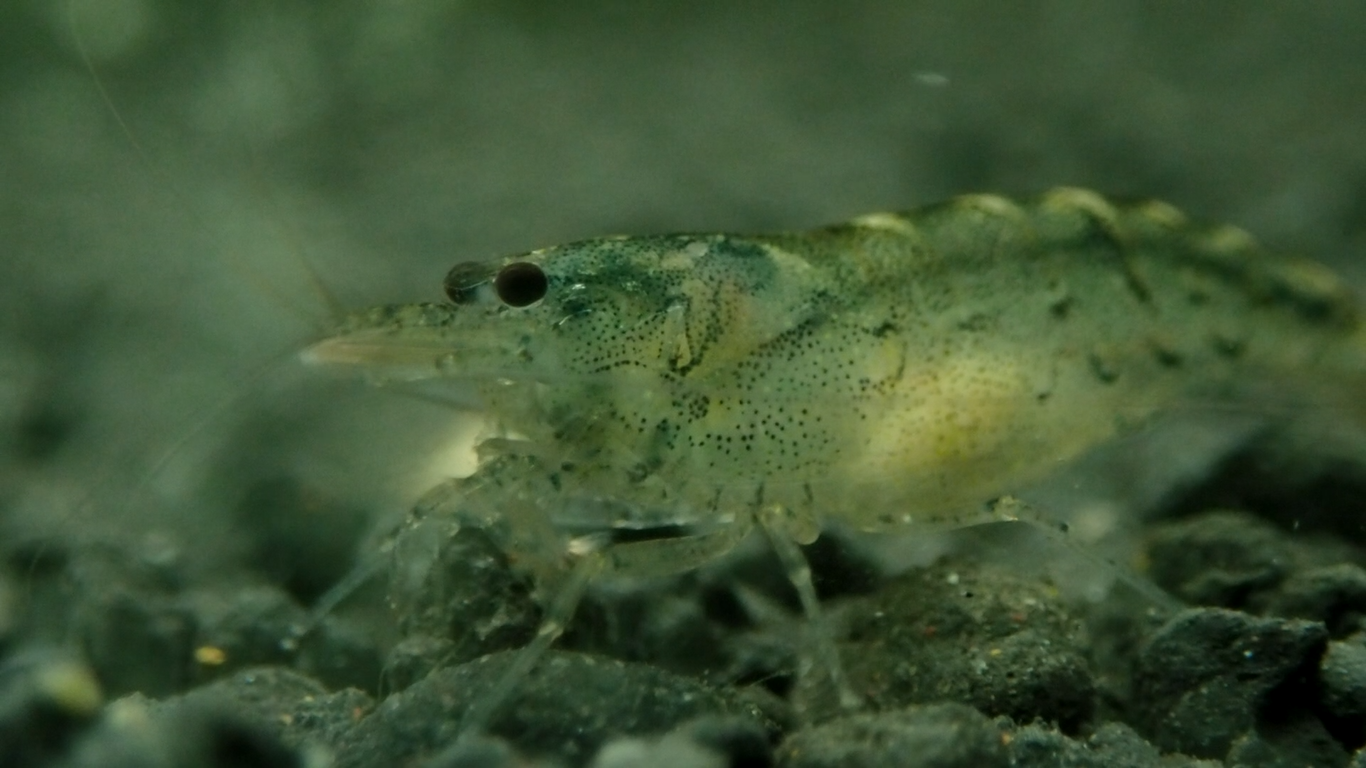
An adult Caridina typus.

=== Juveniles/adults ===
After the larval stages are complete, C. typus will metamorphose into a juvenile stage, which will begin to migrate back to its parental freshwater habitat. Upstream migration of juveniles has been reported for other Caridina, and has been confirmed by observation of smaller C. typus juveniles downstream and larger sized juveniles upstream. Juveniles will enter their adult stage in freshwater and begin recruiting in August. Since juveniles were commonly found during the spawning season and the post-spawning season between August and February, this indicates continuous recruitment.

Males and females will sexually reproduce in freshwater. After mating, females will migrate downstream for spawning in estuarine, brackish environments.

== Evolutionary history ==
The evolutionary origins of C. typus are speculated to be from the Pacific Islands rather than a continent, and the species has since migrated to other islands such as the Japanese islands.

Phylogenetic analyses of Caridinia have revealed that C. typus is a paraphyletic group made up of three morphologically similar yet distinct clades of C. typus, plus the morphologically distinct C. villadolidi, which is suggested to be a separate species by morphological data. The three monophyletic clades, named ARC, SUL, and TAL, each has distinct evolutionary lineages. These lineages likely diverged during the Miocene epoch due to historical geographic barriers in the ocean that restricted gene flow.

Populations from different regions form the three clades as follows:

- ARC: Africa (Seychelles and the Mascarene Islands), Langkawi, the Pacific Islands, and Philippines_SUL.
- SUL: Sulawesi, Bali, West Papua and Halmahera, Aru and Philippines_SUL.
- TAL: Taliabu, Sarawak, and Philippines_TAL.

The ARC clade has a wide distribution and occurs all across the islands of the Indian Ocean to the Philippines, exhibiting geographical heterogeneity. However, there is a clear separation between the C. typus populations in the Indian Ocean versus the Pacific Ocean. This may have been due to the historical Miocene Indian Ocean Equatorial Jet (MIOJet), a westward current that restricted movement of populations from west to east. Dispersal and isolation of populations by the MIOJet has been associated with the evolution of other taxa. The dispersal of C. typus to Africa may have been mediated by the MIOJet, and dispersal eastward to Australia occurred after the Jet closed. The current receded and closed when the island of Sulawesi in Indonesia was established, which similarly limits C. typus interaction at the equatorial zone between the two Oceans. The great dispersal ability of all the lineages may be linked with specific life-history traits like how the zoeal stages can tolerate high salinity levels, facilitating movement between water systems.

== Conservation status ==
According to the IUCN Red List, as of 2011, C. typus is one of the most widespread species of freshwater shrimp and lacks any known major threats, and therefore is a least concern species.

== Caridina typus species-group ==
Short in 1993 first proposed the formation of a Caridina typus species-group, which comprises at least four species. These four species are considered to be part of this group based on having a short, dorsally unarmed rostrum and are differentiated by physical characteristics such as rostrum shape and length, carapace length, and egg size. Amongst those in the species-group are C. confusa, C. typus, C. spinula, and C. zebra. Potentially, the C. typus species-group could have more members, or the subspecies within could be considered their own species.

== Relationships with other organisms ==
=== Holtodrilus truncatus ===
Holtodrilus truncatus is a branchiobdellidan ectosymbiotic parasite found on atyid shrimps, both in captivity and the wild. C. typus is a host shrimp, and H. truncatus can be found inside the carapace, on the external surface of the antennule, rostrum, and abdomen of its host.

=== Macrobrachium japonicum and Macrobrachium lar ===
Macrobrachium japonicum and M. lar are Palaemonidae shrimp that have similar diadromous life cycles to C. typus. All three shrimp live in sympatry, as observed in Japan. Despite their similar life cycles and similar range, they do not compete for food nor space as one would predict. They can freely migrate along the same river continuum without competitive effects.

=== Humans ===
Various anthropogenic effects have affected C. typus in some way. One effect of humans on C. typus has been the alteration of their habitat and distribution using artificial structures such as dams and floodgates. Dams and floodgates affect the amount of flow in rivers. Since C. typus occurs in rivers with smaller flows, they are less abundant in rivers possessing floodgates. Dams and floodgates may also prevent migration routes. Interestingly, C. typus are abundant in rivers with artificial riverbeds or shore projections compared to rivers with only natural vegetation. Not only do human structures impact the shrimp directly such as by intercepting migration routes, but indirect effects such as predation and competition increase can affect the keystone species, leading to ecological complications over time.

Caridina typus can be consumed by humans. Historically, Pohnpei islanders utilized shrimp such as C. typus as a food source when technology for harvesting marine resources was not advanced or readily available. However, freshwater shrimps are not currently as an important part of the Pohnpei islanders' diet.

Amano shrimp such as C. typus can be kept as pets in the aquarium hobby and are referred to as "Australian amano shrimp" despite the species having a much wider distribution in the wild.
