= Flowerhorn cichlid =

Hybrid fish

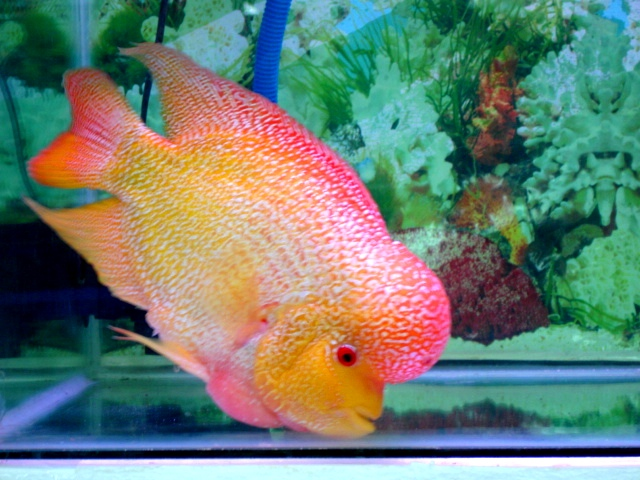
Golden Base type flowerhorn

Flowerhorn cichlids are ornamental aquarium fish noted for their vivid colors and the distinctively shaped heads for which they are named. Their head protuberance is formally called a nuchal hump. Like blood parrot cichlids, they are hybrids that exist in the wild only because of their release. Flowerhorns first emerged for sale on the aquarium market in Malaysia in the late 1990s and soon became popular in many countries in Asia. They are commonly kept by hobbyists in the US, Asia, and Europe. Numerous cast-off flowerhorns have been released to the wild, especially in Singapore and Malaysia, where they have become an invasive pest animal. Their importation is banned in Australia.

== Origin ==
Flowerhorn breeding dates to 1993. Taiwanese and Malaysian peoples admired fish with protruding heads, known as 'kaloi' or 'warships', found in the western part of the nation. The slightly protruding forehead and long tail of cichlids were prized in Taiwanese society as bringing luck in geomancy. By 1994, red devil cichlids (typically Amphilophus labiatus) and trimac cichlids (A. trimaculatus) had been imported from Central America to Malaysia and the hybrid blood parrot cichlid had been imported from Taiwan to Malaysia. These fish were then bred together, marking the birth of the flowerhorn.

=== Arrival in the West ===
When luohans were first imported to the US, there were only two varieties of these fish for distribution: the flowerhorn and the golden base. Flowerhorns came in two varieties; those with pearls (silver-white spots on the skin), and those without.

== In captivity ==
There are several ways by which breeders distinguish between male and female flower horns. Generally, the males are larger than the females, but there are some exceptions. Males have the kok, or the nuchal hump, on their foreheads. Males also usually have brighter and more vivid colors. For most breeds, the females have black dots on their dorsal fins, whereas males usually have longer anal and dorsal fins.

Flowerhorn cichlids are subject to several diseases, including hole-in-head disease, "ich", and digestive blockages.

== Varieties ==
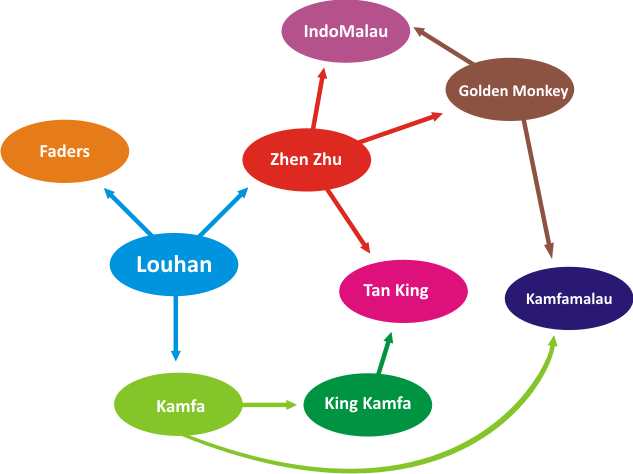
General flowerhorn variety classification, containing several subsets of varieties (strains) from different countries and breeders

The original flowerhorn hybrid stock are referred to as luohans (from the Chinese word for the Buddhist concept of arhat). The four main derived varieties are zhen zhu, golden monkey, kamfa, and the golden base group, which includes faders and the golden trimac. They are sometimes referred to as breeds, though that term technically only refers to varieties of fully domesticated species.

=== Golden Monkey ===
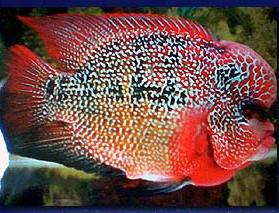
Golden Monkey

It can be a particularly expensive flowerhorn, carrying a price tag of more than one thousand dollars. The most expensive Golden Monkey was sold for $600,000 during a Malaysian exhibition in 2009.

=== Zhen Zhu ===
This variety originated slightly after the Kamfa, derived from the luohan. It has a rounded tail, large mouth, red protruding eyes, and a prominent head flower.

=== King Kamfa ===
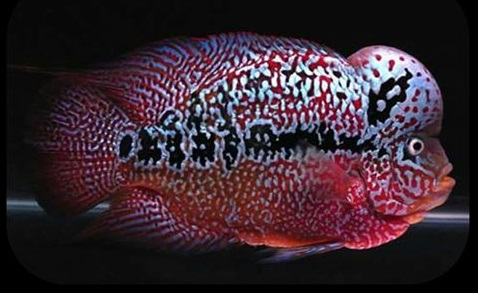
King Kamfa

From the Kamfa family, these Flowerhorns are known for their massive nuchal humps, also called a kok, and their strikingly varied patterning.

=== Kamfamalau ===
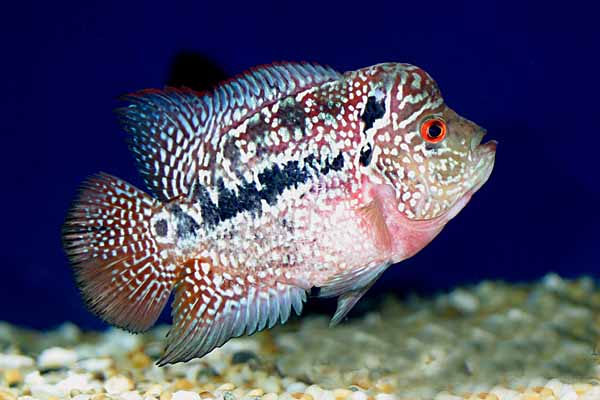
Kamfamalau

This is a cross of a Kamfa male and a Malau female. The body and face resemble a typical Kamfa (see above).

== Strains ==
=== Strains developed in the United States ===
New flowerhorn strains have been developed through breeding programs in the United States. Although it is hard for the US to compete with Asia's well established flowerhorn breeding farms, strains with unique genetics have been created.

== Criticism ==
Flowerhorns have been criticized by cichlid hobbyists and environmentalists for a number of reasons. Flowerhorn breeding resulted in culling of surplus and deformed fish, some of which were dumped in the wild in Malaysia and Singapore, where they survived and disrupted riverine and pond ecosystems. Like most other cichlids, flowerhorns are aggressive and can breed quickly, competing with and eating native fish.

Flowerhorn breeding contributes to the commercial demand for new and different fish, leading to unethical practices such as breeding for anatomical deformities, as occurred in goldfish breeding.

Within the aquarium hobby, flowerhorns are not favored because of the difficulty of breeding them. The majority of flowerhorn males are sterile (cannot reproduce), so finding one that can is time consuming. Hobbyists have to wait until 8–10 months for a male fish to reach sexual maturity then pair it with a female to test fertility.

Other issues regarding flowerhorns is that of some hybrids being sold with tattoos, which some people consider unethical, as well as the use of hormones which have been used to enhance the colors of African haplochromines.

Finally, another issue with regard to flowerhorns is the dilution of genetic lineages, since flowerhorns are hybrids and not true species.

== See also ==
- List of animals with humps
