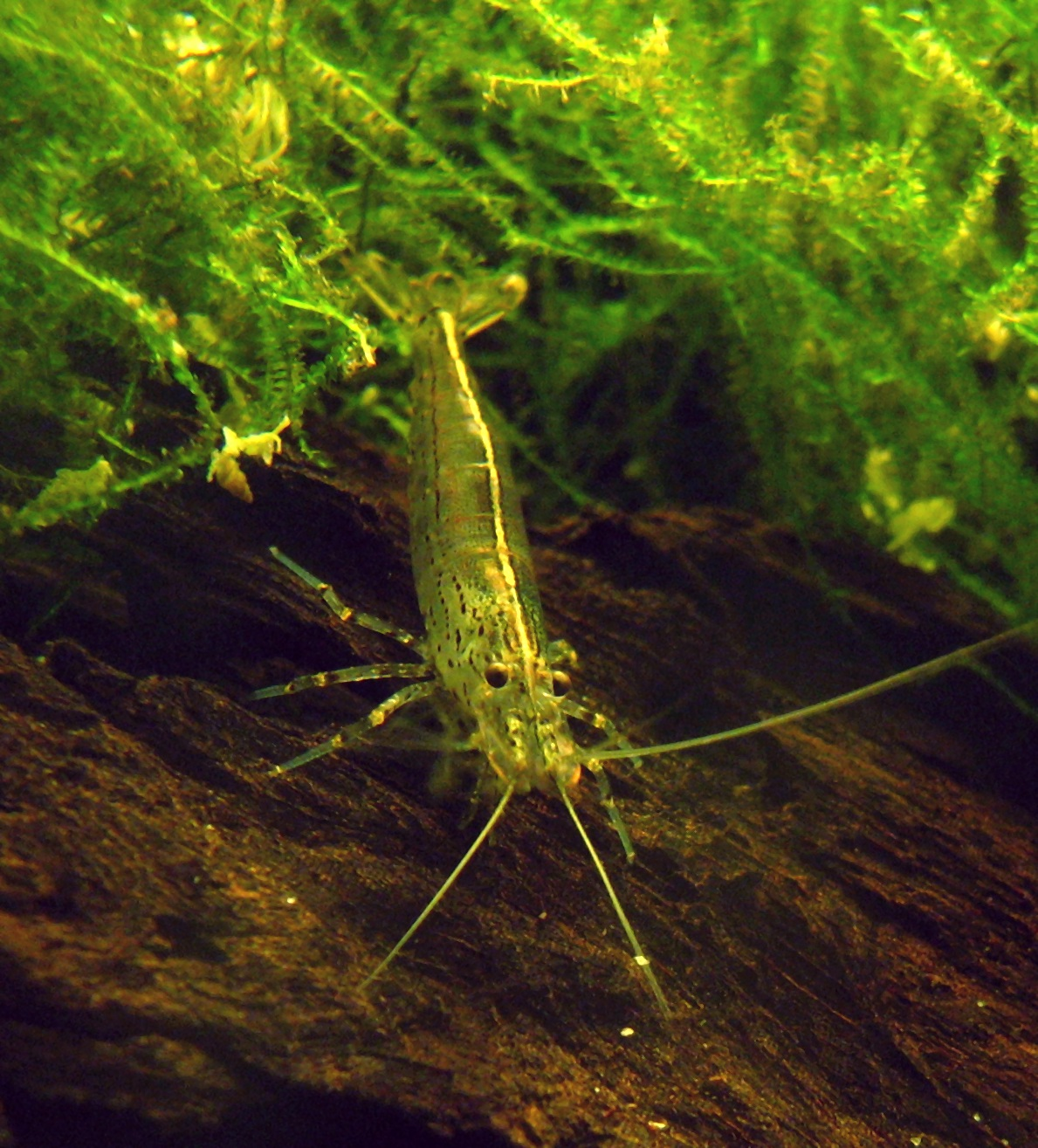
- Caridina multidentata

Scientific classification
- Kingdom: Animalia
- Phylum: Arthropoda
- Clade: Pancrustacea
- Class: Malacostraca
- Order: Decapoda
- Suborder: Pleocyemata
- Infraorder: Caridea
- Superfamily: Atyoidea; De Haan, 1849
- Family: Atyidae; De Haan, 1849

= Atyidae =

Atyidae Temporal range: Berriasian–present

Family of crustaceans

Atyidae is a family of shrimp, present in all tropical and most temperate waters of the world. Adults of this family are almost always confined to fresh water. This is the only family in the superfamily Atyoidea.

== Genera and species ==
The following classification follows De Grave et al. (2010), with subsequent additions.

- Antecaridina Edmondson, 1954
- Archaeatya Villalobos, 1959
- Atya Leach, 1816
- Atyaephyra de Brito Capello, 1867
- Atydina Cai, 2010
- Atyella Calman, 1906
- Atyoida Randall, 1840
- Atyopsis Chace, 1983
- Australatya Chace, 1983
- Caridella Calman, 1906
- Caridina H. Milne-Edwards, 1837
- Caridinides Calman, 1926
- Caridinopsis Bouvier, 1912
- Delclosia Rabadà, 1993 †
- Dugastella Bouvier, 1912
- Edoneus Holthuis, 1978
- Elephantis Castelin, Marquet & Klotz, 2013
- Gallocaris Sket & Zakšek, 2009
- Halocaridina Holthuis, 1963
- Halocaridinides Fujino & Shokita, 1975
- Jolivetya Cals, 1986
- Jonga Hart, 1961
- Lancaris Cai & Bahir, 2005
- Limnocaridella Bouvier, 1913
- Limnocaridina Calman, 1899
- Mancicaris Liang, Z. L. Guo & Tang, 1999
- Marosina Cai & Ng, 2005
- Micratya Bouvier, 1913
- Monsamnis Richard, De Grave & Clark, 2012
- Neocaridina Kubo, 1938
- Palaemonias Hay, 1902
- Paracaridina Liang, Z. L. Guo & Tang, 1999
- Paratya Miers, 1882
- Parisia Holthuis, 1956
- Potimirim Holthuis, 1954
- Puteonator Gurney, 1987
- Pycneus Holthuis, 1986
- Pycnisia Bruce, 1992
- Sinodina Liang & Cai, 1999
- Stygiocaris Holthuis, 1960
- Syncaris Holmes, 1900
- Troglocaris Dormitzer, 1853
- Typhlatya Creaser, 1936
- Typhlocaridina Liang & Yan, 1981
- Typhlopatsa Holthuis, 1956
