= List of endangered invertebrates =

- Extinct in the wild (EW): 2 species
- Critically endangered (CR): 853 species
- Endangered (EN): 1,533 species
- Vulnerable (VU): 1,578 species
- Near threatened (NT, LR/cd): 1,119 species
- Least concern (LC): 8,632 species
- Data deficient (DD): 4,644 species
Invertebrate species (IUCN, 2025.2)
- 18,442 extant species have been evaluated
- 13,798 of those are fully assessed (Note: excludes data deficient evaluations.)
- 9,751 are not threatened at present
- 4,047 to 8,691 are threatened (Note: Threatened comprises CR, EN and VU. Upper estimate additionally includes DD.)
- 83 to 255 are extinct or extinct in the wild:
  - 81 extinct (EX) species (Note: Chart omits extinct (EX) species)
  - 2 extinct in the wild (EW)
  - 171 possibly extinct [CR(PE)]
  - 1 possibly extinct in the wild [CR(PEW)]

Endangered (EN) species are considered to be facing a very high risk of extinction in the wild.

In July 2016, the International Union for Conservation of Nature (IUCN) listed 1163 endangered invertebrate species. Of all evaluated invertebrate species, 6.4% were listed as endangered. The IUCN also lists 36 invertebrate subspecies as endangered.

No subpopulations of invertebrates have been evaluated by the IUCN.

For a species to be considered endangered by the IUCN it must meet certain quantitative criteria which are designed to classify taxa facing "a very high risk of extinction". An even higher risk is faced by critically endangered species, which meet the quantitative criteria for endangered species. Critically endangered invertebrates are listed separately. There are 2150 invertebrate species which are endangered or critically endangered.

Additionally 5278 invertebrate species (29% of those evaluated) are listed as data deficient, meaning there is insufficient information for a full assessment of conservation status. As these species typically have small distributions and/or populations, they are intrinsically likely to be threatened, according to the IUCN. While the category of data deficient indicates that no assessment of extinction risk has been made for the taxa, the IUCN notes that it may be appropriate to give them "the same degree of attention as threatened taxa, at least until their status can be assessed".

This is a complete list of endangered invertebrate species and subspecies as evaluated by the IUCN.

== Molluscs ==
There are 507 mollusc species and nine mollusc subspecies assessed as endangered.

=== Gastropods ===
There are 448 gastropod species and seven gastropod subspecies assessed as endangered.

==== Stylommatophora ====
Stylommatophora includes the majority of land snails and slugs. There are 187 species and two subspecies in the order Stylommatophora assessed as endangered.

===== Partulids =====
- Eua zebrina
- Partula auraniana
- Partula thetis
- Samoana conica
- Samoana diaphana
- Samoana thurstoni

===== Achatinellids =====
- Elasmias ovatulum
- Newcombia canaliculata
- Newcombia cumingi
- Newcombia lirata
- Newcombia perkinsi
- Newcombia pfeifferi
- Newcombia sulcata
- Partulina mighelsiana
- Partulina perdix
- Partulina physa
- Partulina proxima
- Partulina redfieldi
- Partulina semicarinata
- Splendid partulina (Partulina splendida)
- Partulina tappaniana
- Partulina tessellata
- Partulina variabilis
- Perdicella helena

===== Cerastids =====
- Pachnodus becketti
- Pachnodus fregatensis
- Pachnodus kantilali
- Pachnodus niger
- Pachnodus ornatus

===== Endodontids =====
- Aaadonta constricta
- Aaadonta fuscozonata
- Hirasea acutissima
- Hirasea chichijimana
- Hirasea diplomphalus
- Hirasea insignis
- Hirasea operculina
- Thaumatodon hystricelloides
- Thaumatodon subdaedalea

===== Charopids =====
- Ba humbugi
- Orangia cookei
- Orangia sporadica
- Pilula mahesiana
- Ptychodon schuppi
- Radioconus riochcoensis
- Radiodiscus amdenus
- Semperdon uncatus
- Sinployea princei
- Sinployea rotumana
- Trachycystis haygarthi

===== Helicarionids =====
- Advena charon
- Dolapex amiculus
- Erepta odontina
- Kaliella aldabra
- Lutilodix imitratrix
- Mathewsoconcha belli

===== Orthalicids =====
Species

- Boninena callistoderma
- Boninena hiraseana
- Boninena ogasawarae
- Bothriembryon perobesus
- Bothriembryon praecelcus
- Bulimulus cinerarius
- Bulimulus cucullinus
- Bulimulus nux
- Bulimulus olla
- Bulimulus perspectivus
- Bulimulus planospira
- Bulimulus rugulosus
- Placostylus graeffei
- Placostylus guanensis
- Placostylus hoyti
- Placostylus kantavuensis
- Placostylus ochrostoma
- Placostylus seemanni

Subspecies

- Stock Island tree snail (Orthalicus reses reses)

===== Euconulids =====
- Ctenophila caldwelli
- Ctenophila setiliris
- Dancea rodriguezensis
- Dupontia perlucida
- Hacrochlamys lineolatus
- Lamprocystis hahajimana

===== Streptaxids =====
Species

- Careoradula perelegans
- Edentulina moreleti
- Glabrennea gardineri
- Gonospira deshayesi
- Gonospira uvula
- Gulella antelmeana
- Gulella aprosdoketa
- Gulella claustralis
- Gulella taitensis
- Imperturbatia constans
- Imperturbatia violescens
- Microstrophia modesta

Subspecies

- Tayloria urguessensis subangulata

===== Camaenids =====
- Amplirhagada astuta
- Amplirhagada questroana
- Cristilabrum bubulum
- Cristilabrum buryillum
- Cristilabrum grossum
- Cristilabrum solitudum
- Cupedora evandaleana
- Damochlora millepunctata
- Glyptorhagada silveri
- Kimboraga exanima
- Cumberland land snail (Meridolum corneovirens)
- Nanotrachia orientalis
- Mitchell's rainforest snail (Thersites mitchellae)

===== Helicids =====
- Arianta chamaeleon
- Rock snail (Codringtonia codringtonii)
- Cornu mazzullii
- Helix godetiana
- Helix texta
- Helix valentini
- Hemicycla pouchadan
- Iberus gualtieranus
- Lampadia webbiana
- Marmorana nebrodensis
- Tacheocampylaea acropachia
- Tacheocampylaea cyrniaca
- Tacheocampylaea tacheoides
- Theba grasseti

===== Hygromiids =====
- Actinella carinofausta
- Canariella eutropis
- Canariella huttereri
- Candidula grovesiana
- Candidula setubalensis
- Caseolus calvus
- Cernuella rugosa
- Discula pulvinata
- Discula tectiformis
- Geomitra moniziana
- Geomitra tiarella
- Helicella stiparum
- Leptaxis caldeirarum
- Leptaxis minor
- Leptaxis wollastoni
- Monacha auturica
- Pyrenaearia organiaca
- Serratorotula coronata
- Trochulus biconicus
- Xerocrassa edmundi
- Xerocrassa montserratensis
- Xerocrassa moraguesi
- Xerosecta adolfi
- Xerotricha gasulli
- Xerotricha pavida

===== Other Stylommatophora species =====
- Ampelita fulgurata
- Ampelita julii
- Purcell's hunter slug (Chlamydephorus purcelli)
- Cryptazeca kobelti
- Eucobresia pegorarii
- Euonyma curtissima
- Helicodonta wilhelminae
- Kern shoulderband (Helminthoglypta callistoderma)
- Lampedusa imitatrix
- Leiostyla concinna
- Leiostyla falknerorum
- Leptachatina lepida
- Macrochlamys sp. nov. 'White, umbilicate'
- Megalobulimus fragilion
- Megalobulimus lopesi
- Megalobulimus parafragilior
- Clench's middle-toothed land snail (Mesodon clenchi)
- Microcystina sp. nov. 'Kien Luong'
- Napaeus doliolum
- Napaeus myosotis
- Napaeus nanodes
- Obelus discogranulatus
- Occirhenea georgiana
- Ouagapia perryi
- Parmacella tenerifensis
- Quickia aldabrensis
- Sculptiferussacia clausiliaeformis
- Stylodonta studeriana
- Subuliniscus arambourgi
- Succinea piratarum
- Succinea quadrasi
- Thapsia buraensis
- Thapsia snelli
- Kaputar pink slug (Triboniophorus sp. nov. 'Kaputar')
- Trochomorpha albostriata
- Trochomorpha apia
- Trochomorpha tavinniensis
- Trochomorpha transarata
- Truncatellina arcyensis
- Vallonia suevica
- Vertigo heldi
- Victaphanta compacta
- Videna oleacina
- Zonitoides jaccetanicus

==== Littorinimorpha ====
There are 147 species and three subspecies in the order Littorinimorpha assessed as endangered.

===== Hydrobiids =====
- Alzoniella asturica
- Alzoniella delmastroi
- Alzoniella edmundi
- Alzoniella finalina
- Tumbling Creek cavesnail (Antrobia culveri)
- Beddomeia capensis
- Beddomeia fallax
- Belgrandia conoidea
- Belgrandia lusitanica
- Belgrandiella adsharica
- Belgrandiella aulaei
- Belgrandiella wawrai
- Boetersiella sturmi
- Bracenica spiridoni
- Bythinella bavarica
- Bythinella carinulata
- Bythinella viridis
- Bythinella zyvionteki
- Bythiospeum bormanni
- Bythiospeum clessini
- Bythiospeum elseri
- Bythiospeum klemmi
- Bythiospeum labiatum
- Bythiospeum lamperti
- Bythiospeum nocki
- Bythiospeum noricum
- Bythiospeum sterkianum
- Bythiospeum taxisi
- Daphniola exigua
- Falsipyrgula barroisi
- Falsipyrgula pfeiferi
- Fonscochlea aquatica
- Fonscochlea billakalina
- Giustia bodoni
- Giustia gofasi
- Giustia janai
- Giustia midarensis
- Graecoanatolica dinarica
- Graecoanatolica lacustristurca
- Graecoanatolica pamphylica
- Graecoanatolica tenuis
- Graziana cezairensis
- Graziana klagenfurtensis
- Graziana provincialis
- Graziana trinitatis
- Hadopyrgus anops
- Hadopyrgus brevis
- Hauffenia jadertina
- Hauffenia kerschneri
- Hauffenia nesemanni
- Hauffenia wienerwaldensis
- Heideella knidirii
- Heideella sp. nov. 'salahi'
- Hemistomia pusillior
- Heterocyclus perroquini
- Heterocyclus petiti
- Horatia sp. nov. 'aghbalensis'
- Horatia sp. nov. 'haasei'
- Hydrobia guyenoti
- Hydrobia maroccana
- Hydrobia plena
- Hydrobia schoutedeni
- Iglica bagliviaeformis
- Islamia henrici
- Islamia pallida
- Jardinella acuminata
- Jardinella exigua
- Jardinella jesswiseae
- Jardinella pallida
- Jardinella zeidlerorum
- Leiorhagium montfaouense
- Leiorhagium ruali
- Leptopyrgus manneringi
- Lyhnidia gjorgjevici
- Maroccopsis agadirensis
- Ocmulgee marstonia (Marstonia agarhecta)
- Mercuria meridionalis
- Mercuria vindilica
- Meridiopyrgus murihiku
- Moominia willii
- Narentiana vjetrenicae
- Ohridohauffenia depressa
- Ohridohauffenia rotonda
- Ohridohauffenia sanctinaumi
- Ohridohoratia carinata
- Ohrigocea karevi
- Ohrigocea miladinovorum
- Ohrigocea ornata
- Ohrigocea samuili
- Ohrigocea stankovici
- Parabythinella macedonica
- Paxillostium nanum
- Pezzolia radapalladis
- Plagigeyeria deformata
- Plagigeyeria zetaprotogona
- Pseudamnicola geldiayana
- Pseudamnicola lucensis
- Pseudamnicola solitaria
- Pyrgohydrobia prespaensis
- Duckwater pyrg (Pyrgulopsis aloba)
- San Bernardino springsnail (Pyrgulopsis bernardina)
- Transverse grand pyrg (Pyrgulopsis cruciglans)
- Naegele springsnail (Pyrgulopsis metcalfi)
- Salenthydrobia ferrerii
- Sardohoratia islamioides
- Saxurinator montenegrinus
- Sipun cave water snail (Saxurinator sketi)
- Spathogyna fezi
- Tarraconia rolani
- Tongapyrgus subterraneus
- Trochidrobia inflata
- Vinodolia fiumana
- Vinodolia fluviatilis
- Vinodolia gluhodolica
- Vinodolia scutarica

===== Bithyniids =====
Species

- Bithynia pesicii
- Bithynia prespensis
- Bithynia skadarskii
- Bithynia zeta
- Funduella incisa
- Gabbiella barthi
- Gabbiella spiralis
- Gabbiella tchadiensis
- Gabbiella verdcourti
- Liminitesta sulcata
- Pseudobithynia levantica
- Pseudobithynia trichonis

Subspecies

- Gabbiella humerosa alberti
- Gabbiella humerosa edwardi
- Gabbiella humerosa kyogae

===== Assimineids =====
- Pecos assiminea (Assiminea pecos)
- Cape Leeuwin snail (Austroassiminea letha)
- Eussoia inopina
- Omphalotropis hieroglyphica
- Omphalotropis subsoluta

===== Pomatiopsids =====
- Fenouilia kreitneri
- Pachydrobia zilchi
- Tomichia differens
- Tomichia ventricosa
- Tomichia zwellendamensis

===== Other Littorinimorpha species =====
- Cremnoconchus carinatus
- Cremnoconchus syhadrensis
- Heleobia foxianensis
- Paladilhia gloeeri
- Spiralix valenciana
- Stenothyra huaimoi
- Tropidophora articulata
- Tropidophora deburghiae
- Tropidophora gardineri
- Devil tryonia (Tryonia diaboli)

==== Sorbeoconcha ====
- Bathanalia howesi
- Brotia pageli
- Cleopatra athiensis
- Cleopatra mweruensis
- Cleopatra pilula
- Cleopatra rugosa
- Walnut elimia (Elimia bellula)
- Hirthia littorina
- Spiny river snail (Io fluvialis)
- Juga occata
- Painted rocksnail (Leptoxis taeniata)
- Melanoides crawshayi
- Melanoides kinshassaensis
- Melanoides wagenia
- Melanopsis dircaena
- Melanopsis etrusca
- Melanopsis letourneuxi
- Melanopsis magnifica
- Melanopsis mourebeyensis
- Melanopsis scalaris
- Paludomus ajanensis
- Paludomus messageri
- Rough hornsnail (Pleurocera foremani)
- Potadoma angulata
- Potadoma nyongensis
- Potadoma ponthiervillensis
- Potadoma trochiformis
- Potadoma zenkeri
- Potadomoides pelseneeri
- Pseudocleopatra bennikei
- Semisulcospira morii

==== Architaenioglossa ====
Species

- Adelopoma stolli
- Anulotaia forcarti
- Arinia biplicata
- Arinia streptaxiformis
- Bellamya contracta
- Bellamya crawshayi
- Bellamya phthinotropis
- Bellamya robertsoni
- Boucardicus carylae
- Boucardicus culminans
- Boucardicus curvifolius
- Boucardicus delicatus
- Boucardicus divei
- Boucardicus esetrae
- Boucardicus magnilobatus
- Boucardicus mahermanae
- Boucardicus randalanai
- Boucardicus victorhernandezi
- Cipangopaludina dianchiensis
- Cyathopoma picardense
- Cyclophorus sp. nov. 'cave'
- Cyclophorus sp. nov. 'Periomphalic furrow'
- Diplommatina inflatula
- Diplommatina pyramis
- Fijiopoma liberata
- Gonatorhaphe intercostata
- Gonatorhaphe stricta
- Heterogen longispira
- Hungerfordia pelewensis
- Lanistes alexandri
- Lanistes nyassanus
- Lanistes solidus
- Macropalaina pomatiaeformis
- Margarya bicostata
- Margarya mansuyi
- Margarya melanoides
- Notopala sublineata
- Opisthostoma dormani
- Opisthostoma simplex
- Palaina taviensis
- Palaina wilsoni
- Tulotoma (Tulotoma magnifica)

Subspecies

- Bellamya unicolor abyssinicus
- Maizania hildebrandti thikensis

==== Cycloneritimorpha ====
- Helicina rostrata
- Black nerite (Theodoxus prevostianus)
- Metkovich cave nerite (Theodoxus subterrelictus)
- Striped nerite (Theodoxus transversalis)

==== Hygrophila species ====
There are 22 Hygrophila species assessed as endangered.

===== Planorbids =====
- Africanogyrus rodriguezensis
- Africanogyrus starmuehlneri
- Ancylus lapicidus
- Ancylus tapirulus
- Biomphalaria tchadiensis
- Bulinus camerunensis
- Bulinus succinoides
- Ceratophallus concavus
- Ferrissia kavirondica
- Ferrissia toroensis
- Gyraulus cockburni
- Gyraulus crenophilus
- Gyraulus fontinalis
- Gyraulus meierbrooki
- Gyraulus stankovici
- Gyraulus trapezoides
- Planorbis macedonicus

===== Lymnaeids =====
- Lymnaea maroccana
- Radix pinteri
- Radix skutaris
- Shortspire pondsnail (Stagnicola idahoensis)
- Stagnicola kayseris

==== Neogastropoda ====
- Conus ateralbus
- Conus belairensis
- Conus bruguieresi
- Conus cloveri
- Conus crotchii
- Conus cuneolus
- Conus echinophilus
- Conus fernandesi
- Conus hybridus
- Conus mercator
- Conus unifasciatus

==== Other gastropod species ====
- Pinto abalone (Haliotis kamtschatkana)
- Caterpillar slug (Laevicaulis haroldi)
- Valvata klemmi
- Valvata montenegrina

=== Bivalvia ===
There are 57 species and two subspecies in the class Bivalvia assessed as endangered.

==== Unionida ====
There are 54 species and two subspecies in the order Unionoida assessed as endangered.

===== Margaritiferids =====
- Spectacle case pearly mussel (Cumberlandia monodonta)
- Margaritifera homsensis
- Margaritifera laosensis
- Freshwater pearl mussel (Margaritifera margaritifera)
- Alabama pearl shell (Margaritifera marrianae)

===== Unionids =====
Species

- Altamaha arcmussel (Alasmidonta arcula)
- Cumberland elktoe (Alasmidonta atropurpurea)
- Southern elktoe (Alasmidonta triangulata)
- Anodonta pseudodopsis
- Wheeler's pearly mussel (Arcidens wheeleri)
- Coelatura stagnorum
- Cristaria truncata
- Salina mucket (Disconaias salinasensis)
- Chipola slabshell (Elliptio chipolaensis)
- Altamaha spinymussel (Elliptio spinosa)
- Oyster mussel (Epioblasma capsaeformis)
- Fine-rayed pigtoe pearly mussel (Fusconaia cuneolus)
- Narrow pigtoe (Fusconaia escambia)
- Triangle pigtoe (Fusconaia lananensis)
- Atlantic pigtoe (Fusconaia masoni)
- Finelined pocketbook (Hamiota altilis)
- Lamprotula contritus
- Lamprotula ponderosa
- Yellow lampmussel (Lampsilis cariosa)
- Higgins' eye pearly mussel (Lampsilis higginsii)
- Arkansas fatmucket (Lampsilis powellii)
- Neosho mucket (Lampsilis rafinesqueana)
- Alabama moccasinshell (Medionidus acutissimus)
- Coosa moccasinshell (Medionidus parvulus)
- Modellnaia siamensis
- Round ebonyshell (Obovaria rotulata)
- Oxynaia diespiter
- Oxynaia micheloti
- Sheepnose (Plethobasus cyphyus)
- Southern clubshell (Pleurobema decisum)
- Oval pigtoe (Pleurobema pyriforme)
- Heavy pigtoe (Pleurobema taitianum)
- Slab-sided pearly mussel (Pleuronaia dolabelloides)
- Texas heelsplitter (Potamilus amphichaenus)
- Inflated heelsplitter (Potamilus inflatus)
- Black river mussel (Potomida littoralis)
- Prisodontopsis aviculaeformis
- Protunio messageri
- Pseudodon resupinatus
- Triangular kidneyshell (Ptychobranchus greenii)
- Cumberland monkeyface pearly mussel (Quadrula intermedia)
- Unio abyssinicus
- Thick shelled river mussel (Unio crassus)
- Unio durieui
- Bean mussel (Villosa fabalis)

Subspecies

- Catspaw (Epioblasma obliquata obliquata)
- Rough rabbitsfoot (Quadrula cylindrica strigillata)

===== Other Unionida species =====
- Diplodon dunkerianus
- Diplodon fontaineanus
- Mutela langi
- Pseudomulleria dalyi

==== Venerida ====
- Corbicula possoensis
- Pisidium edlaueri

=== Cephalopods ===
- Cirroctopus hochbergi
- Opisthoteuthis mero

== Cnidaria ==
There are 28 species in the phylum Cnidaria assessed as endangered.

=== Hydrozoa ===
- Sea ginger (Millepora alcicornis)
- Millepora exaesa
- Net fire coral (Millepora dichotoma)
- Millepora intricata
- Blade fire coral (Millepora platyphylla)
- Millepora tenera

=== Anthozoa ===
There are 26 species in the class Anthozoa assessed as endangered.

==== Sea pens ====
- Crassophyllum thessalonicae

==== Actiniaria ====
- Greek anemone (Paranemonia vouliagmensis)

==== Scleractinia ====
- Acropora rongelapensis
- Acropora roseni
- Acropora rudis
- Acropora suharsonoi
- Alveopora excelsa
- Alveopora minuta
- Anacropora spinosa
- Cantharellus noumeae
- Mediterranean pillow coral (Cladocora caespitosa)
- Ctenella chagius
- Hydnophora bonsai
- Isopora togianensis
- Lithophyllon ranjithi
- Lobophyllia serratus
- Boulder star coral (Montastraea annularis)
- Mountainous star coral (Montastraea faveolata)
- Rice coral (Montipora capitata)
- Hawaiian reef coral (Montipora dilatata)
- Montipora setosa
- Parasimplastrea sheppardi
- Pectinia maxima
- Pocillopora fungiformis
- Porites desilveri
- Porites eridani
- Porites ornata
- Stylophora madagascarensis

== Arthropods ==
There are 616 arthropod species and 27 arthropod subspecies assessed as endangered.

=== Xhiphosura ===
- Tri-spine horseshoe crab (Tachypleus tridentatus)

=== Centipedes ===
- Australobius abbreviatus
- Australobius inflatitarsis
- Australobius sechellarum
- Mecistocephalus megalodon
- Seychelles long-legged centipede (Seychellonema gerlachi)

=== Arachnids ===
There are 72 arachnid species assessed as endangered.

==== Harvestmen ====
- Biantes albimanus
- Biantes minimus
- Gnomulus bedoharvengorum
- Ibalonius inscriptus
- Ibalonius karschii
- Mitraceras pulchra
- Samoa sechellana

==== Spiders ====
- Kauaʻi cave wolf spider (Adelocosa anops)
- Anapistula seychellensis
- Argyrodes chionus
- Bardala labarda
- Baviola luteosignata
- Cenemus mikehilli
- Cenemus silhouette
- Clubiona mahensis
- Clubiona nigrimaculosa
- Cynapes wrighti
- Dipoena hasra
- Dipoena pristea
- Euryopis helcra
- Firmicus insularis
- Gamasomorpha mornensis
- Parambikulam large burrowing spider (Haploclastus kayi)
- Hispo alboclypea
- Hispo striolata
- Ischnothyreus serpentinum
- Larinia dasia
- Lionneta mahensis
- Lionneta orophila
- Lionneta praslinensis
- Lionneta savyi
- Lionneta sechellensis
- Lionneta silhouettei
- Lionneta veli
- Mariblemma pandani
- Microbianor golovatchi
- Nanume naneum
- Orchestina justini
- Orchestina sechellorum
- Patri david
- Phycosoma menustya
- Beautiful parachute spider (Poecilotheria formosa)
- Bengal ornamental (Poecilotheria miranda)
- Reddish parachute spider (Poecilotheria rufilata)
- Prasonica anarillea
- Prasonicella marsa
- Prida sechellensis
- Pseudicius seychellensis
- Rhomphaea recurvata
- Sadies gibbosa
- Sadies trifasciata
- Salpesia soricina
- Sason sechellanum
- Scytodes pholcoides
- Seycellesa braueri
- Seychellia wiljoi
- Stenoonops opisthornatus
- Tetrablemma benoiti
- Theridion cloxum
- Theridion mehlum
- Theridion nagorum
- Theridion palanum
- Tylorida mornensis

==== Other arachnid species ====
- Anatemnus seychellesensis
- Anepsiozomus sobrinus
- Apozomus gerlachi
- Compsaditha seychellensis
- Ideoblothrus seychellesensis
- Isometrus deharvengi
- Fading beetle mite (Scheloribates evanescens)
- Brauer's giant mite (Sternothyrus braueri)

=== Branchiopoda ===
- Conservancy fairy shrimp (Branchinecta conservatio)
- Longhorn fairy shrimp (Branchinecta longiantenna)
- San Diego fairy shrimp (Branchinecta sandiegonensis)
- Peninsula fairy shrimp (Branchinella alachua)
- Lepidurus packardi
- Streptocephalus dendrophorus
- Streptocephalus dendyi
- Streptocephalus guzmani
- Riverside fairy shrimp (Streptocephalus woottoni)
- Streptocephalus zuluensis

=== Millipedes ===
- Badplaas black millipede (Doratogonus furculifer)
- Strong black millipede (Doratogonus infragilis)
- Minor black millipede (Doratogonus minor)
- Ruby-legged black millipede (Doratogonus rubipodus)
- Northern black millipede (Doratogonus septentrionalis)
- Zululand black millipede (Doratogonus zuluensis)
- Eucarlia hoffmani
- Eucarlia urophora
- Gonatotrichus silhouettensis
- Pterozonium tropiphorum
- Rhinotus densepilosus
- Rhinotus vanmoli
- Seychelles giant millipede (Sechelleptus seychellarum)
- Seychelles pill-millipede (Sechelliosoma forcipatum)
- Spiromanes braueri
- Spiromanes sechellarum

=== Malacostracans ===
Malacostraca includes crabs, lobsters, crayfish, shrimp, krill, woodlice, and many others. There are 170 malacostracan species and six malacostracan subspecies assessed as endangered.

==== Isopods ====
Species

- Burmoniscus sp. nov. 'HC - first segment white'
- Clifton cave isopod (Caecidotea barri)
- Lee County cave isopod (Lirceus usdagalun)
- Coahuila isopod (Mexistenasellus coahuila)
- Monolistra bolei
- Monolistra spinosissima
- Speocirolana thermydromis
- Sphaerolana affinis
- Sphaerolana interstitialis
- Thermosphaeroma milleri

Subspecies

- Asellus aquaticus carniolicus
- Asellus aquaticus cyclobranchialis
- Monolistra racovitzai conopyge

==== Amphipods ====
Species

- Pennsylvania cave amphipod (Crangonyx dearolfi)
- Illinois cave amphipod (Gammarus acherondytes)
- Paramelita barnardi
- Kauaʻi cave amphipod (Spelaeorchestia kiloana)
- Hay's spring amphipod (Stygobromus hayi)
- Peck's cave amphipod (Stygobromus pecki)

Subspecies

- Niphargus elegans zagrebensis

==== Decapods ====
There are 154 decapod species and two decapod subspecies assessed as endangered.

===== Parastacids =====
- Astacoides caldwelli
- Tasmanian giant freshwater crayfish (Astacopsis gouldi)
- Cherax pallidus
- Engaeus disjuncticus
- Furneaux burrowing crayfish (Engaeus martigener)
- Narracan burrowing crayfish (Engaeus phyllocercus)
- Dunsborough burrowing crayfish (Engaewa reducta)
- Walpole burrowing crayfish (Engaewa walpolea)
- Euastacus balanesis
- Euastacus bidawalis
- Euastacus brachythorax
- Ellen Clark's crayfish (Euastacus clarkae)
- Euastacus claytoni
- Alpine spiny crayfish (Euastacus crassus)
- Orbost spiny crayfish (Euastacus diversus)
- Euastacus fleckeri
- Euastacus gumar
- Euastacus hirsutus
- Euastacus hystricosus
- Euastacus maccai
- Euastacus neodiversus
- Euastacus pilosus
- Euastacus polysetosus
- Euastacus rieki
- Euastacus spinichelatus
- Euastacus urospinosus
- Tenuibranchiurus glypticus

===== Gecarcinucids =====
- Ceylonthelphusa alpina
- Ceylonthelphusa armata
- Ceylonthelphusa cavatrix
- Ceylonthelphusa diva
- Coccusa cristicervix
- Geithusa pulchra
- Irmengardia didacta
- Irmengardia nemestrinus
- Lepidothelphusa cognetti
- Migmathelphusa olivacea
- Oziotelphusa dakuna
- Oziotelphusa gallicola
- Oziotelphusa populosa
- Parathelphusa batamensis
- Parathelphusa nagasakti
- Pastilla dacuna
- Phricotelphusa gracilipes
- Salangathelphusa anophrys
- Sayamia melanodactylus
- Siamthelphusa holthuisi
- Taiwan waist crab (Somanniathelphusa taiwanensis)
- Somanniathelphusa zanklon
- Spiralothelphusa fernandoi
- Spiralothelphusa parvula
- Sundathelphusa sottoae
- Terrathelphusa kuchingensis
- Thaksinthelphusa yongchindaratae

===== Atyids =====
- Atya intermedia
- Caridina annandalei
- Caridina dennerli
- Caridina glaubrechti
- Caridina holthuisi
- Caridina lanceolata
- Caridina lingkonae
- Caridina loehae
- Caridina maculata
- Caridina masapi
- Caridina mindanao
- Caridina parvula
- Caridina profundicola
- Caridina spinata
- Caridina spongicola
- Caridina striata
- Caridina tenuirostris
- Caridina thermophila
- Caridina woltereckae
- Dugastella marocana
- Alabama cave shrimp (Palaemonias alabamae)
- Sinodina gregoriana
- California freshwater shrimp (Syncaris pacifica)

===== Cambarids =====
Species

- Cambarellus patzcuarensis
- Slenderclaw crayfish (Cambarus cracens)
- Conasauga blue burrower (Cambarus cymatilis)
- Piedmont blue burrower (Cambarus harti)
- Phantom cave crayfish (Cambarus pecki)
- Sweet home Alabama crayfish (Cambarus speleocoopi)
- Slenderwrist burrowing crayfish (Fallicambarus petilicarpus)
- Oktibbeha riverlet crayfish (Hobbseus orconectoides)
- Choctaw riverlet crayfish (Hobbseus valleculus)
- Yalobusha riverlet crayfish (Hobbseus yalobushensis)
- Louisville crayfish (Orconectes jeffersoni)
- Cave crayfish (Orconectes packardi)
- Leopard crayfish (Orconectes pardalotus)
- Nashville crayfish (Orconectes shoupi)
- Orlando cave crayfish (Procambarus acherontis)
- Coastal flatwoods crayfish (Procambarus apalachicolae)
- Procambarus bouvieri
- Brazoria crayfish (Procambarus brazoriensis)
- Mississippi flatwoods crayfish (Procambarus cometes)
- Procambarus contrerasi
- Procambarus digueti
- Panama City crayfish (Procambarus econfinae)
- Santa Fe cave crayfish (Procambarus erythrops)
- Escambia crayfish (Procambarus escambiensis)
- Orange Lake cave crayfish (Procambarus franzi)
- Big blue spring cave crayfish (Procambarus horsti)
- Procambarus hortonhobbsi
- Coastal lowland cave crayfish (Procambarus leitheuseri)
- Shutispear crayfish (Procambarus lylei)
- Miami cave crayfish (Procambarus milleri)
- Woodville Karst cave crayfish (Procambarus orcinus)
- Procambarus roberti
- Procambarus zihuateutlensis

Subspecies

- Withlocoochee light-fleeing cave crayfish (Procambarus lucifugus lucifugus)

===== Potamonautids =====
- Purple marsh crab (Afrithelphusa monodosa)
- Tree hole crab (Globonautes macropus)
- Dwarf river crab (Liberonautes nanoides)
- Lobster claw crab (Liberonautes rubigimanus)
- Louisea balssi
- Louisea edeaensis
- Potamonautes gonocristatus
- Potamonautes idjiwiensis
- Potamonautes mutandensis
- Potamonautes platycentron

===== Potamids =====
- Doimon doichiangdao
- Doimon doisutep
- Geothelphusa levicervix
- Yangmingshan crab (Geothelphusa yangminshan)
- Hainanpotamon orientale
- Ibanum pilimanus
- Indochinamon bhumibol
- Indochinamon villosum
- Iomon nan
- Johora punicea
- Stoliczia chaseni

===== Palaemonids =====
Species

- Arachnochium kulsiense
- Calathaemon holthuisi
- Macrobrachium hirtimanus
- Macrobrachium minutum
- Macrobrachium naso
- Macrobrachium poeti
- Balcones cave shrimp (Palaemonetes antrorum)
- Palaemonetes suttkusi

Subspecies

- Macrobrachium lamarrei lamarroides

===== Other decapod species =====
- Alpheus cyanoteles
- White-clawed crayfish (Austropotamobius pallipes)
- Desmocaris bislineata
- Euryrhynchina edingtonae
- Hypolobocera exuca
- California Bay pea crab (Parapinnixa affinis)
- Potamalpheops amnicus
- Potamalpheops haugi
- Tehuana lamothei
- Tehuana poglayenorum
- Trichodactylus crassus
- Typhlocaris ayyaloni
- Typhlocaris galilea
- Typhlopseudothelphusa mocinoi

=== Insects ===
There are 343 insect species and 21 insect subspecies assessed as endangered.

==== Blattodea ====
- Hololeptoblatta minor
- Miriamrothschildia aldabrensis
- Miriamrothschildia biplagiata
- Miriamrothschildia mahensis
- Gerlach's cockroach (Nocticola gerlachi)
- Theganopteryx lunulata
- Theganopteryx minuta

==== Orthoptera ====
There are 91 species and two subspecies in the order Orthoptera assessed as endangered.

===== Lentulids =====
- Slender restio grasshopper (Betiscoides meridionalis)
- Small restio grasshopper (Betiscoides parva)
- Robust restio grasshopper (Betiscoides sjostedti)

===== Tetrigids =====
- Amphinotus nymphula
- Amphinotus pupulus
- Procytettix thalassanax

===== Euschmidtiids =====
- Jagos monkey grasshopper (Chromomastax jagoi)
- Ufipa monkey grasshopper (Euschmidtia fitzgeraldi)
- Tanga monkey grasshopper (Euschmidtia tangana)

===== Mogoplistids =====
- Arachnocephalus subsulcatus
- Ectatoderus aldabrae
- Ectatoderus nigriceps
- Ectatoderus squamiger
- Ornebius stenus
- Ornebius syrticus

===== Pamphagids =====
- Parnassos stone grasshopper (Glyphanus obtusus)
- Groovy stone grasshopper (Kurtharzia sulcata)
- Slender stone grasshopper (Orchamus gracilis)
- Karpathos stone grasshopper (Orchamus kaltenbachi)
- Chopard's stone grasshopper (Paranocarodes chopardi)
- Eastern stone grasshopper (Prionotropis hystrix)
- Willemse's stone grasshopper (Prionotropis willemsorum)
- Purpurarian stone grasshopper (Purpuraria erna)
- Lanzarote stick grasshopper (Purpuraria magna)

===== Crickets =====
Species

- Seychelles palm cricket (Metioche bolivari)
- Laricis tree cricket (Oecanthus laricis)
- Orthoxiphus nigrifrons
- Phaeogryllus fuscus
- Scottiola salticiformis
- Seychelles short-winged cricket (Seychellesia longicercata)
- Seychellesia patellifera
- Zarceus major

Subspecies

- Phaloria insularis insularis

===== Acridids =====
- Uluguru slender grasshopper (Acanthoxia aculeus)
- Tanzanian coast grasshopper (Acteana alazonica)
- Uluguru forest edge grasshopper (Afrophlaeoba euthynota)
- Rubeho forest edge grasshopper (Afrophlaeoba longicornis)
- Nguru forest edge grasshopper (Afrophlaeoba nguru)
- Uluguru dusky grasshopper (Aresceutica morogorica)
- Usambara dusky grasshopper (Aresceutica subnuda)
- Ferdinand's grasshopper (Chorthippus ferdinandi)
- Karaman grasshopper (Chorthippus relicticus)
- Sicilian cross-backed grasshopper (Dociostaurus minutus)
- Seychelles palm grasshopper (Enoplotettix gardineri)
- Usambara noble grasshopper (Eupropacris pompalis)
- Uvinza grasshopper (Hadrolecocatantops uvinza)
- Lila Downs' friar grasshopper (Liladownsia fraile)
- Sardinian match grasshopper (Ochrilidia nuragica)
- Chelmos mountain grasshopper (Oropodisma chelmosi)
- Karavica mountain grasshopper (Oropodisma karavica)
- Parnassos mountain grasshopper (Oropodisma parnassica)
- Tymphrestos mountain grasshopper (Oropodisma tymphrestosi)
- Tymphi mountain grasshopper (Peripodisma tymphii)
- Pternoscirtus aldabrae
- Dinarian grasshopper (Rammeihippus dinaricus)
- Gran Canaria sand grasshopper (Sphingonotus guanchus)
- Knotty sand grasshopper (Sphingonotus nodulosus)
- Club toothed grasshopper (Stenobothrus clavatus)
- Zayante band-winged grasshopper (Trimerotropis infantilis)
- Santa Monica Mountains grasshopper (Trimerotropis occidentaloides)
- Lompoc grasshopper (Trimerotropis occulens)

===== Tettigoniids =====
- Brown false shieldback (Aroegas fuscus)
- Big-bellied glandular bush-cricket (Bradyporus macrogaster)
- Cyprian red-headed bush-cricket (Bucephaloptera cypria)
- Gran Canaria green bush-cricket (Calliphona alluaudi)
- Gomera green bush-cricket (Calliphona gomerensis)
- Palma green bush-cricket (Calliphona palmensis)
- Lesotho meadow katydid (Conocephalus basutoanus)
- Striped restio katydid (Conocephalus vaginalis)
- Mount Ida marbled bush-cricket (Eupholidoptera astyla)
- Spiny marbled bush-cricket (Eupholidoptera spinigera)
- Kawanaphila pachomai
- Chelmos Greek bush-cricket (Parnassiana chelmos)
- Tymphi Greek bush-cricket (Parnassiana tymphiensis)
- Tymphrestos Greek bush-cricket (Parnassiana tymphrestos)
- Rentz's ambush katydid (Peringueyella rentzi)
- Lucas' dark bush-cricket (Pholidoptera lucasi)
- Psacadonotus insulanus
- Lesina bush-cricket (Rhacocleis buchichii)
- Seychelles predatory bush-cricket (Seselphisis visenda)
- Jambila seedpod shieldback (Thoracistus jambila)
- Seedpod shieldback (Thoracistus semeniphagus)
- Inflated seedpod shieldback (Thoracistus thyraeus)
- Throscodectes xederoides
- Throscodectes xiphos
- Adriatic marmored bush-cricket (Zeuneriana marmorata)

===== Phaneropterids =====
Species

- Tree winter katydid (Brinckiella arboricola)
- Cyprian plump bush-cricket (Isophya mavromoustakisi)
- Epiros bright bush-cricket (Poecilimon gracilioides)
- Paros bright bush-cricket (Poecilimon paros)
- Pindos bright bush-cricket (Poecilimon pindos)
- Soulion bright bush-cricket (Poecilimon soulion)

Subspecies

- Isophya longicaudata longicaudata

==== Hymenoptera ====
- Ammobates melectoides
- Andrena stepposa
- Bombus brachycephalus
- Crotch bumble bee (Bombus crotchii)
- Bombus dahlbomii
- Bombus fraternus
- Bombus haueri
- Bombus inexspectatus
- Bombus reinigiellus
- Bombus steindachneri
- Colletes merceti
- Colletes sierrensis
- Colletes wolfi
- Dasypoda frieseana
- Flavipanurgus granadensis
- Halictus carinthiacus
- Halictus microcardia
- Lasioglossum breviventre

==== Lepidoptera ====
Lepidoptera comprises moths and butterflies. There are 51 species in the order Lepidoptera assessed as endangered.

===== Swallowtail butterflies =====
- Graphium levassori
- Apo swallowtail (Graphium sandawanum)
- Queen Alexandra's birdwing (Ornithoptera alexandrae)
- Wallace's golden birdwing (Ornithoptera croesus)
- Southern tailed birdwing (Ornithoptera meridionalis)
- Papilio aristophontes
- Luzon peacock swallowtail (Papilio chikae)
- Homerus swallowtail (Papilio homerus)
- Papilio moerneri

===== Lycaenids =====
- Illidge's ant blue (Acrodipsas illidgei)
- Cloud copper (Aloeides nubilus)
- Arawacus aethesa
- Joiceya praeclarus
- Nirodia belphegor
- Orachrysops niobe
- Dickson's copper (Oxychaeta dicksoni)
- Bathurst copper (Paralucia spinifera)
- Vogel's blue (Plebejus vogelii)
- Zullich's blue (Plebejus zullichi)
- Poecilmitis rileyi
- Poecilmitis swanepoeli
- Mesopotamian blue (Polyommatus dama)
- Piedmont anomalous blue (Polyommatus humedasae)
- Theresia's blue (Polyommatus theresiae)
- Fatma's blue (Pseudophilotes fatma)
- Wallengren's copper (Trimenia wallengrenii)

===== Nymphalids =====
- Comoro friar (Amauris comorana)
- Atlas grayling (Arethusana aksouali)
- Biak dark crow (Euploea albicosta)
- Murphy's crow (Euploea caespes)
- Seychelles crow (Euploea mitra)
- Biak threespot crow (Euploea tripunctata)
- Karpathos grayling (Hipparchia christenseni)
- Ponza grayling (Hipparchia sbordonii)
- Hewitson's small tree-nymph (Ideopsis hewitsonii)
- Moroccan wall brown (Lasiommata meadewaldoi)
- Halicarnas brown (Maniola halicarnassus)
- Kuekenthal's yellow tiger (Parantica kuekenthali)
- Biak tiger (Parantica marcia)
- Milagros' tiger (Parantica milagros)
- Father Schoenig's chocolate (Parantica schoenigi)
- Bonthain tiger (Parantica sulewattan)
- Timor yellow tiger (Parantica timorica)
- Madeiran speckled wood (Pararge xiphia)
- Pseudochazara amymone
- Pseudochazara euxina
- Schneider's surprise (Tiradelphe schneideri)

===== Other Lepidoptera species =====
- Madeiran brimstone (Gonepteryx maderensis)
- Black grass-dart butterfly (Ocybadistes knightorum)
- Canary Islands large white (Pieris cheiranthi)
- Fabulous green sphinx moth (Tinostoma smaragditis)

==== Beetles ====
There are 72 beetle species assessed as endangered.

===== Dytiscids =====
- Agabus clypealis
- Agabus discicollis
- Agabus hozgargantae
- Deronectes aljibensis
- Graptodytes delectus
- Hydrotarsus pilosus
- Rhantus alutaceus
- Rhithrodytes agnus

===== Stag beetles =====
- Colophon barnardi
- Colophon eastmani
- Colophon haughtoni
- Colophon thunbergi
- Colophon whitei
- Dorcus alexisi

===== Geotrupids =====
- Ceratophyus martinezi
- Ceratophyus rossii
- Thorectes balearicus
- Thorectes baraudi
- Thorectes castillanus
- Thorectes catalonicus
- Thorectes chersinus
- Thorectes coiffaiti
- Thorectes distinctus
- Thorectes hernandezi
- Thorectes hispanus
- Thorectes orocantabricus
- Thorectes punctatissimus
- Thorectes punctatolineatus
- Thorectes puncticollis
- Thorectes sardous
- Thorectes variolipennis
- Typhaeus hiostius
- Typhaeus momus

===== Longhorn beetles =====
- Anaglyptus luteofasciatus
- Anaglyptus praecellens
- Crotchiella brachyptera
- Isotomus jarmilae
- Pseudosphegesthes bergeri
- Ropalopus ungaricus
- Stenopterus creticus
- Trichoferus bergeri
- Pitt Island longhorn beetle (Xylotoles costatus)

===== Scarabaeids =====
- Ahermodontus ambrosi
- Ateuchus ambiguus
- Canthonella gomezi
- Yanbaru long-armed scarab beetle (Cheirotonus jambar)
- Cryptocanthon altus
- Cryptocanthon nebulinus
- Cryptocanthon punctatus
- Dichotomius eucranioides
- Dichotomius schiffleri
- Endroedyolus paradoxus
- Heptaulacus gadetinus
- Shadowy chafer (Mellissius adumbratus)
- Nimbus anyerae
- Onoreidium howdeni
- Proagoderus uluguru
- Sarophorus punctatus

===== Other beetle species =====
- Ampedus assingi
- Ampedus quadrisignatus
- Sacramento beetle (Anthicus sacramento)
- Goldstreifiger (Buprestis splendens)
- Columbia river tiger beetle (Cicindela columbica)
- Puritan tiger beetle (Cicindela puritana)
- Eustra honchongensis
- Lichen weevil (Gymnopholus lichenifer)
- Harvengia vietnamita
- Leipaspis pinicola
- Violet click beetle (Limoniscus violaceus)
- Osmoderma cristinae
- Osmoderma italica
- Osmoderma lassallei

==== Odonata ====
Odonata includes dragonflies and damselflies. There are 97 species and 19 subspecies in the order Odonata assessed as endangered.

===== Platystictids =====
- Drepanosticta ceratophora
- Cacao shadowdamsel (Palaemnema baltodanoi)
- Chiriquita shadowdamsel (Palaemnema chiriquita)
- Black-backed shadowdamsel (Palaemnema melanota)
- Palaemnema orientalis
- Reventazón shadowdamsel (Palaemnema reventazoni)
- Sulcosticta striata

===== Platycnemidids =====
Species

- Allocnemis montana
- Arabineura khalidi
- Chlorocnemis sp. nov. A
- Jungle threadtail (Elattoneura caesia)
- Two-spotted threadtail (Elattoneura oculata)
- Liberian riverjack (Mesocnemis tisi)
- Kubusi featherlegs (Metacnemis valida)
- Pilbara threadtail (Nososticta pilbara)
- Risiocnemis antoniae

Subspecies

- Coeliccia flavicauda masakii
- Coeliccia ryukyuensis amamii
- Coeliccia ryukyuensis ryukyuensis

===== Megapodagrionids =====
- Heteragrion calendulum
- Jamaican hypolestes (Hypolestes clara)
- Philogenia monotis
- Rhipidolestes okinawanus
- Paria wood elf (Sciotropis lattkei)

===== Gomphids =====
Species

- Asiagomphus coreanus
- Asiagomphus yayeyamensis
- Epigomphus armatus
- Humped knobtail (Epigomphus camelus)
- Guatemalan knobtail (Epigomphus clavatus)
- Horned knobtail (Epigomphus corniculatus)
- Donnelly's knobtail (Epigomphus donnellyi)
- Flint's knobtail (Epigomphus flinti)
- Limón knobtail (Epigomphus houghtoni)
- Maya knobtail (Epigomphus maya)
- Paulson's knobtail (Epigomphus paulsoni)
- Alajuela knobtail (Epigomphus subsimilis)
- Tuxtla knobtail (Epigomphus sulcatistyla)
- Cartago knobtail (Epigomphus verticicornis)
- Westfall's knobtail (Epigomphus westfalli)
- Chinese tiger (Gomphidia kelloggi)
- Rivulet tiger (Gomphidia pearsoni)
- Cherokee clubtail (Gomphus consanguis)
- Columbia clubtail (Gomphus lynnae)
- Microgomphus wijaya
- Notogomphus cottarellii
- Maathai's longleg (Notogomphus maathaiae)
- Notogomphus ruppeli
- Southern snaketail (Ophiogomphus australis)
- Edmund's snaketail (Ophiogomphus edmundo)
- Ris's sanddragon (Progomphus risi)
- Bristle-tipped sanddargon (Progomphus tennesseni)
- Elusive sanddragon (Progomphus zephyrus)

Subspecies

- Asiagomphus amamiensis amamiensis
- Asiagomphus amamiensis okinawanus
- Stylogomphus ryukyuanus asatol
- Stylogomphus ryukyuanus watanabei

===== Calopterygids =====
Species

- Caliphaea angka
- Glittering demoiselle (Calopteryx exul)
- Clear-winged demoiselle (Calopteryx hyalina)
- Syrian demoiselle (Calopteryx syriaca)
- Clearwing (Sapho puella)
- Cameroon sparklewing (Umma mesumbei)

Subspecies

- Matrona basilaris japonica

===== Coenagrionids =====
Species

- Acanthagrion williamsoni
- Aciagrion fasciculare
- Coenagriocnemis rufipes
- Drepanoneura donnellyi
- Mesamphiagrion demarmelsi
- Mesamphiagrion gaudiimontanum
- Mesamphiagrion nataliae
- Mesamphiagrion santainense
- Blue-and-orange threadtail (Microneura caligata)
- Pseudagrion arabicum
- Badplaas sprite (Pseudagrion inopinatum)
- Telebasis flammeola

Subspecies

- Pseudagrion torridum hulae

===== Aeshnids =====
Species

- Cretan spectre (Boyeria cretensis)
- Oligoaeschna kunigamiensis
- Rhionaeschna caligo
- Rhionaeschna galapagoensis
- Staurophlebia bosqi

Subspecies

- Planaeschna ishigakiana ishigakiana
- Planaeschna ishigakiana nagaminei
- Planaeschna risi sakishimana

===== Libellulids =====
Species

- Fruhstorfer's junglewatcher (Hylaeothemis fruhstorferi)
- Micrathyria coropinae
- Sympetrum maculatum
- Thalassothemis marchali
- Urothemis thomasi

Subspecies

- Leucorrhinia intermedia ijimai
- Orthetrum poecilops miyajimaense
- Urothemis thomasi thomasi

===== Other Odonata =====
Species

- Allolestes maclachlani
- Dune ringtail (Austrolestes minjerriba)
- Bayadera ishigakiana
- Chlorogomphus okinawensis
- Amatola malachite (Chlorolestes apricans)
- Greek goldenring (Cordulegaster helladica)
- Hemicordulia apoensis
- Hemicordulia ogasawarensis
- Ancient greenling (Hemiphlebia mirabilis)
- Idionyx galeata
- Libellago balus
- Macromia kubokaiya
- Beautiful petaltail (Petalura pulcherrima)
- Metropolitan redspot (Phyllopetalia altarensis)
- Hispaniolan malachite (Phylolestes ethelae)
- Procordulia lompobatang
- Rhinocypha hageni
- Rhinocypha orea
- Rhinocypha uenoi

Subspecies

- Chlorogomphus brunneus brunneus
- Buchholz' cordulegaster (Cordulegaster helladica buchholzi)
- Cordulegaster helladica helladica
- Hemicordulia mindana nipponica

==== Other insect species ====
- Mccarthy's plant-louse (Acizzia mccarthyi)
- Anisolabis scotti
- Giant torrent midge (Edwardsina gigantea)
- Seychelles winged stick insect (Graffaea seychellensis)
- Sugarfoot moth fly (Nemapalpus nearcticus)
- Canary dwarf mantis (Pseudoyersinia canariensis)
- Large blue Lake mayfly (Tasmanophlebia lacuscoerulei)

== Echinoderms ==
- Japanese spiky sea cucumber (Apostichopus japonicus)
- Golden sandfish (Holothuria lessoni)
- Black teatfish (Holothuria nobilis)
- Sandfish (Holothuria scabra)
- Black teatfish (Holothuria whitmaei)
- Brown sea cucumber (Isostichopus fuscus)
- Isostichopus macroparentheses
- Prickly redfish (Thelenota ananas)
- Thelenota rubralineata

== Other invertebrate species ==
- Antiponemertes allisonae
- Oregon giant earthworm (Driloleirus macelfreshi)
- Giant Gippsland earthworm (Megascolides australis)
- Macroperipatus insularis
- Blind velvet worm (Tasmanipatus anophthalamus)

== See also ==
- Lists of IUCN Red List endangered species
- List of least concern invertebrates
- List of near threatened invertebrates
- List of vulnerable invertebrates
- List of critically endangered invertebrates
- List of recently extinct invertebrates
- List of data deficient invertebrates
