= List of endangered arthropods =

- Extinct in the wild (EW): 2 species
- Critically endangered (CR): 850 species
- Endangered (EN): 1,531 species
- Vulnerable (VU): 1,574 species
- Near threatened (NT, LR/cd): 1,118 species
- Least concern (LC): 8,632 species
- Data deficient (DD): 4,643 species
Arthropod species (IUCN, 2025-2)
- 18431 extant species have been evaluated
- 13788 of those are fully assessed (Note: excludes data deficient evaluations.)
- 9750 are not threatened at present
- 4223 to 8866 are threatened (Note: Threatened comprises CR, EN and VU. Upper estimate additionally includes DD.)
- 83 to 261 are extinct or extinct in the wild:
  - 81 extinct (EX) species (Note: Chart omits extinct (EX) species)
  - 2 extinct in the wild (EW)
  - 171 possibly extinct [CR(PE)]
  - 1 possibly extinct in the wild [CR(PEW)]

Endangered (EN) species are considered to be facing a very high risk of extinction in the wild.

In July 2016, the International Union for Conservation of Nature (IUCN) listed 616 endangered arthropod species. Of all evaluated arthropod, 6.5% species are listed as endangered. The IUCN also lists 27 arthropod subspecies as endangered.

No subpopulations of arthropods have been evaluated by the IUCN.

For a species to be considered endangered by the IUCN it must meet certain quantitative criteria which are designed to classify taxa facing "a very high risk of extinction". An even higher risk is faced by critically endangered species, which meet the quantitative criteria for endangered species. Critically endangered arthropods are listed separately. There are 1010 arthropod species which are endangered or critically endangered.

Additionally 2875 arthropod species (30% of those evaluated) are listed as data deficient, meaning there is insufficient information for a full assessment of conservation status. As these species typically have small distributions and/or populations, they are intrinsically likely to be threatened, according to the IUCN. While the category of data deficient indicates that no assessment of extinction risk has been made for the taxa, the IUCN notes that it may be appropriate to give them "the same degree of attention as threatened taxa, at least until their status can be assessed".

This is a complete list of endangered arthropod species and subspecies as evaluated by the IUCN.

== Centipedes ==
- Australobius abbreviatus
- Australobius inflatitarsis
- Australobius sechellarum
- Mecistocephalus megalodon
- Seychelles long-legged centipede (Seychellonema gerlachi)

== Arachnids ==
There are 72 arachnid species assessed as endangered.

=== Harvestmen ===
- Biantes albimanus
- Biantes minimus
- Gnomulus bedoharvengorum
- Ibalonius bimaculatus
- Ibalonius inscriptus
- Ibalonius karschii
- Mitraceras pulchra
- Samoa sechellana

=== Spiders ===
- Kauaʻi cave wolf spider (Adelocosa anops)
- Anapistula seychellensis
- Argyrodes chionus
- Bardala labarda
- Baviola luteosignata
- Cenemus mikehilli
- Cenemus silhouette
- Clubiona mahensis
- Clubiona nigrimaculosa
- Cynapes wrighti
- Dipoena hasra
- Dipoena pristea
- Euryopis helcra
- Firmicus insularis
- Gamasomorpha mornensis
- Parambikulam large burrowing spider (Haploclastus kayi)
- Hispo alboclypea
- Hispo striolata
- Ischnothyreus serpentinum
- Larinia dasia
- Lionneta mahensis
- Lionneta orophila
- Lionneta praslinensis
- Lionneta savyi
- Lionneta sechellensis
- Lionneta silhouettei
- Lionneta veli
- Mariblemma pandani
- Microbianor golovatchi
- Nanume naneum
- Orchestina justini
- Orchestina sechellorum
- Patri david
- Phycosoma menustya
- Beautiful parachute spider (Poecilotheria formosa)
- Bengal ornamental (Poecilotheria miranda)
- Reddish parachute spider (Poecilotheria rufilata)
- Prasonica anarillea
- Prasonicella marsa
- Prida sechellensis
- Pseudicius seychellensis
- Rhomphaea recurvata
- Sadies gibbosa
- Sadies trifasciata
- Salpesia soricina
- Sason sechellanum
- Scytodes pholcoides
- Seycellesa braueri
- Seychellia wiljoi
- Stenoonops opisthornatus
- Tetrablemma benoiti
- Theridion cloxum
- Theridion mehlum
- Theridion nagorum
- Theridion palanum
- Tylorida mornensis

=== Other arachnid species ===
- Anatemnus seychellesensis
- Anepsiozomus sobrinus
- Apozomus gerlachi
- Compsaditha seychellensis
- Ideoblothrus seychellesensis
- Isometrus deharvengi
- Fading beetle mite (Scheloribates evanescens)
- Brauer's giant mite (Sternothyrus braueri)

== Branchiopoda ==
- Conservancy fairy shrimp (Branchinecta conservatio)
- Longhorn fairy shrimp (Branchinecta longiantenna)
- San Diego fairy shrimp (Branchinecta sandiegonensis)
- Peninsula fairy shrimp (Branchinella alachua)
- Triops baeticus
- Triops gadensis
- Triops vicentinus
- Lepidurus packardi
- Streptocephalus dendrophorus
- Streptocephalus dendyi
- Streptocephalus guzmani
- Riverside fairy shrimp (Streptocephalus woottoni)
- Streptocephalus zuluensis

== Millipedes ==
- Badplaas black millipede (Doratogonus furculifer)
- Strong black millipede (Doratogonus infragilis)
- Minor black millipede (Doratogonus minor)
- Ruby-legged black millipede (Doratogonus rubipodus)
- Northern black millipede (Doratogonus septentrionalis)
- Zululand black millipede (Doratogonus zuluensis)
- Eucarlia hoffmani
- Eucarlia urophora
- Gonatotrichus silhouettensis
- Pterozonium tropiphorum
- Rhinotus densepilosus
- Rhinotus vanmoli
- Seychelles giant millipede (Sechelleptus seychellarum)
- Seychelles pill-millipede (Sechelliosoma forcipatum)
- Spiromanes braueri
- Spiromanes sechellarum

== Malacostracans ==
Malacostraca includes crabs, lobsters, crayfish, shrimp, krill, woodlice, and many others. There are 170 malacostracan species and six malacostracan subspecies assessed as endangered.

=== Isopods ===
Species

- Burmoniscus sp. nov. 'HC - first segment white'
- Clifton cave isopod (Caecidotea barri)
- Lee County cave isopod (Lirceus usdagalun)
- Coahuila isopod (Mexistenasellus coahuila)
- Monolistra bolei
- Monolistra spinosissima
- Speocirolana thermydromis
- Sphaerolana affinis
- Sphaerolana interstitialis
- Thermosphaeroma milleri

Subspecies

- Asellus aquaticus carniolicus
- Asellus aquaticus cyclobranchialis
- Monolistra racovitzai conopyge

=== Amphipods ===
Species

- Pennsylvania cave amphipod (Crangonyx dearolfi)
- Illinois cave amphipod (Gammarus acherondytes)
- Paramelita barnardi
- Kaui cave amphipod (Spelaeorchestia kiloana)
- Hay's spring amphipod (Stygobromus hayi)
- Peck's cave amphipod (Stygobromus pecki)

Subspecies

- Niphargus elegans zagrebensis

=== Decapods ===
There are 154 decapod species and two decapod subspecies assessed as endangered.

==== Parastacids ====
- Tasmanian giant freshwater crayfish (Astacopsis gouldi)
- Cherax pallidus
- Engaeus disjuncticus
- Furneaux burrowing crayfish (Engaeus martigener)
- Narracan burrowing crayfish (Engaeus phyllocercus)
- Dunsborough burrowing crayfish (Engaewa reducta)
- Walpole burrowing crayfish (Engaewa walpolea)
- Euastacus balanesis
- Euastacus bidawalis
- Euastacus brachythorax
- Ellen Clark's crayfish (Euastacus clarkae)
- Euastacus claytoni
- Alpine spiny crayfish (Euastacus crassus)
- Orbost spiny crayfish (Euastacus diversus)
- Euastacus fleckeri
- Euastacus gumar
- Euastacus hirsutus
- Euastacus hystricosus
- Euastacus maccai
- Euastacus neodiversus
- Euastacus pilosus
- Euastacus polysetosus
- Euastacus rieki
- Euastacus spinichelatus
- Euastacus urospinosus
- Tenuibranchiurus glypticus

==== Gecarcinucids ====
- Ceylonthelphusa alpina
- Ceylonthelphusa armata
- Ceylonthelphusa cavatrix
- Ceylonthelphusa diva
- Coccusa cristicervix
- Geithusa pulchra
- Irmengardia didacta
- Irmengardia nemestrinus
- Lepidothelphusa cognetti
- Migmathelphusa olivacea
- Oziotelphusa dakuna
- Oziotelphusa gallicola
- Oziotelphusa populosa
- Parathelphusa batamensis
- Parathelphusa nagasakti
- Pastilla dacuna
- Phricotelphusa gracilipes
- Salangathelphusa anophrys
- Sayamia melanodactylus
- Siamthelphusa holthuisi
- Taiwan waist crab (Somanniathelphusa taiwanensis)
- Somanniathelphusa zanklon
- Spiralothelphusa fernandoi
- Spiralothelphusa parvula
- Sundathelphusa sottoae
- Terrathelphusa kuchingensis
- Thaksinthelphusa yongchindaratae

==== Atyids ====
- Atya intermedia
- Caridina annandalei
- Caridina dennerli
- Caridina glaubrechti
- Caridina holthuisi
- Caridina lanceolata
- Caridina lingkonae
- Caridina loehae
- Caridina maculata
- Caridina masapi
- Caridina mindanao
- Caridina parvula
- Caridina profundicola
- Caridina spinata
- Caridina spongicola
- Caridina striata
- Caridina tenuirostris
- Caridina thermophila
- Caridina woltereckae
- Dugastella marocana
- Alabama cave shrimp (Palaemonias alabamae)
- Sinodina gregoriana
- California freshwater shrimp (Syncaris pacifica)

==== Cambarids ====
Species

- Cambarellus patzcuarensis
- Slenderclaw crayfish (Cambarus cracens)
- Conasauga blue burrower (Cambarus cymatilis)
- Piedmont blue burrower (Cambarus harti)
- Phantom cave crayfish (Cambarus pecki)
- Sweet home Alabama crayfish (Cambarus speleocoopi)
- Slenderwrist burrowing crayfish (Fallicambarus petilicarpus)
- Oktibbeha riverlet crayfish (Hobbseus orconectoides)
- Choctaw riverlet crayfish (Hobbseus valleculus)
- Yalobusha riverlet crayfish (Hobbseus yalobushensis)
- Louisville crayfish (Orconectes jeffersoni)
- Cave crayfish (Orconectes packardi)
- Leopard crayfish (Orconectes pardalotus)
- Nashville crayfish (Orconectes shoupi)
- Orlando cave crayfish (Procambarus acherontis)
- Coastal flatwoods crayfish (Procambarus apalachicolae)
- Procambarus bouvieri
- Brazoria crayfish (Procambarus brazoriensis)
- Mississippi flatwoods crayfish (Procambarus cometes)
- Procambarus contrerasi
- Procambarus digueti
- Panama City crayfish (Procambarus econfinae)
- Santa Fe cave crayfish (Procambarus erythrops)
- Escambia crayfish (Procambarus escambiensis)
- Orange Lake cave crayfish (Procambarus franzi)
- Big blue spring cave crayfish (Procambarus horsti)
- Procambarus hortonhobbsi
- Coastal lowland cave crayfish (Procambarus leitheuseri)
- Shutispear crayfish (Procambarus lylei)
- Miami cave crayfish (Procambarus milleri)
- Woodville Karst cave crayfish (Procambarus orcinus)
- Procambarus roberti
- Procambarus zihuateutlensis

Subspecies

- Withlocoochee light-fleeing cave crayfish (Procambarus lucifugus lucifugus)

==== Potamonautids ====
- Purple marsh crab (Afrithelphusa monodosa)
- Tree hole crab (Globonautes macropus)
- Dwarf river crab (Liberonautes nanoides)
- Lobster claw crab (Liberonautes rubigimanus)
- Louisea balssi
- Louisea edeaensis
- Potamonautes gonocristatus
- Potamonautes idjiwiensis
- Potamonautes mutandensis
- Potamonautes platycentron

==== Potamids ====
- Doimon doichiangdao
- Doimon doisutep
- Geothelphusa levicervix
- Yangmingshan crab (Geothelphusa yangminshan)
- Hainanpotamon orientale
- Ibanum pilimanus
- Indochinamon bhumibol
- Indochinamon villosum
- Iomon nan
- Johora punicea
- Stoliczia chaseni

==== Palaemonids ====
Species

- Arachnochium kulsiense
- Calathaemon holthuisi
- Macrobrachium hirtimanus
- Macrobrachium minutum
- Macrobrachium naso
- Macrobrachium poeti
- Balcones cave shrimp (Palaemonetes antrorum)
- Palaemonetes suttkusi

Subspecies

- Macrobrachium lamarrei lamarroides

==== Other decapod species ====
- Alpheus cyanoteles
- White-clawed crayfish (Austropotamobius pallipes)
- Desmocaris bislineata
- Euryrhynchina edingtonae
- Hypolobocera exuca
- California Bay pea crab (Parapinnixa affinis)
- Potamalpheops amnicus
- Potamalpheops haugi
- Tehuana lamothei
- Tehuana poglayenorum
- Trichodactylus crassus
- Typhlocaris ayyaloni
- Typhlocaris galilea
- Typhlopseudothelphusa mocinoi

== Insects ==
There are 343 insect species and 21 insect subspecies assessed as endangered.

=== Blattodea ===
- Hololeptoblatta minor
- Miriamrothschildia aldabrensis
- Miriamrothschildia biplagiata
- Miriamrothschildia mahensis
- Gerlach's cockroach (Nocticola gerlachi)
- Theganopteryx lunulata
- Theganopteryx minuta

=== Orthoptera ===
There are 91 species and two subspecies in the order Orthoptera assessed as endangered.

==== Lentulids ====
- Slender restio grasshopper (Betiscoides meridionalis)
- Small restio grasshopper (Betiscoides parva)
- Robust restio grasshopper (Betiscoides sjostedti)

==== Tetrigids ====
- Amphinotus nymphula
- Amphinotus pupulus
- Procytettix thalassanax

==== Euschmidtiids ====
- Jagos monkey grasshopper (Chromomastax jagoi)
- Ufipa monkey grasshopper (Euschmidtia fitzgeraldi)
- Tanga monkey grasshopper (Euschmidtia tangana)

==== Mogoplistids ====
- Arachnocephalus subsulcatus
- Ectatoderus aldabrae
- Ectatoderus nigriceps
- Ectatoderus squamiger
- Ornebius stenus
- Ornebius syrticus

==== Pamphagids ====
- Parnassos stone grasshopper (Glyphanus obtusus)
- Groovy stone grasshopper (Kurtharzia sulcata)
- Slender stone grasshopper (Orchamus gracilis)
- Karpathos stone grasshopper (Orchamus kaltenbachi)
- Chopard's stone grasshopper (Paranocarodes chopardi)
- Eastern stone grasshopper (Prionotropis hystrix)
- Willemse's stone grasshopper (Prionotropis willemsorum)
- Purpurarian stone grasshopper (Purpuraria erna)
- Lanzarote stick grasshopper (Purpuraria magna)

==== Crickets ====
Species

- Seychelles palm cricket (Metioche bolivari)
- Laricis tree cricket (Oecanthus laricis)
- Orthoxiphus nigrifrons
- Phaeogryllus fuscus
- Scottiola salticiformis
- Seychelles short-winged cricket (Seychellesia longicercata)
- Seychellesia patellifera
- Zarceus major

Subspecies

- Phaloria insularis insularis

==== Acridids ====
- Uluguru slender grasshopper (Acanthoxia aculeus)
- Tanzanian coast grasshopper (Acteana alazonica)
- Uluguru forest edge grasshopper (Afrophlaeoba euthynota)
- Rubeho forest edge grasshopper (Afrophlaeoba longicornis)
- Nguru forest edge grasshopper (Afrophlaeoba nguru)
- Uluguru dusky grasshopper (Aresceutica morogorica)
- Usambara dusky grasshopper (Aresceutica subnuda)
- Ferdinand's grasshopper (Chorthippus ferdinandi)
- Karaman grasshopper (Chorthippus relicticus)
- Sicilian cross-backed grasshopper (Dociostaurus minutus)
- Seychelles palm grasshopper (Enoplotettix gardineri)
- Usambara noble grasshopper (Eupropacris pompalis)
- Uvinza grasshopper (Hadrolecocatantops uvinza)
- Lila Downs' friar grasshopper (Liladownsia fraile)
- Sardinian match grasshopper (Ochrilidia nuragica)
- Chelmos mountain grasshopper (Oropodisma chelmosi)
- Karavica mountain grasshopper (Oropodisma karavica)
- Parnassos mountain grasshopper (Oropodisma parnassica)
- Tymphrestos mountain grasshopper (Oropodisma tymphrestosi)
- Tymphi mountain grasshopper (Peripodisma tymphii)
- Pternoscirtus aldabrae
- Dinarian grasshopper (Rammeihippus dinaricus)
- Gran Canaria sand grasshopper (Sphingonotus guanchus)
- Knotty sand grasshopper (Sphingonotus nodulosus)
- Club toothed grasshopper (Stenobothrus clavatus)
- Zayante band-winged grasshopper (Trimerotropis infantilis)
- Santa Monica Mountains grasshopper (Trimerotropis occidentaloides)
- Lompoc grasshopper (Trimerotropis occulens)

==== Tettigoniids ====
- Brown false shieldback (Aroegas fuscus)
- Big-bellied glandular bush-cricket (Bradyporus macrogaster)
- Cyprian red-headed bush-cricket (Bucephaloptera cypria)
- Gran Canaria green bush-cricket (Calliphona alluaudi)
- Gomera green bush-cricket (Calliphona gomerensis)
- Palma green bush-cricket (Calliphona palmensis)
- Lesotho meadow katydid (Conocephalus basutoanus)
- Striped restio katydid (Conocephalus vaginalis)
- Mount Ida marbled bush-cricket (Eupholidoptera astyla)
- Spiny marbled bush-cricket (Eupholidoptera spinigera)
- Kawanaphila pachomai
- Chelmos Greek bush-cricket (Parnassiana chelmos)
- Tymphi Greek bush-cricket (Parnassiana tymphiensis)
- Tymphrestos Greek bush-cricket (Parnassiana tymphrestos)
- Rentz's ambush katydid (Peringueyella rentzi)
- Lucas' dark bush-cricket (Pholidoptera lucasi)
- Psacadonotus insulanus
- Lesina bush-cricket (Rhacocleis buchichii)
- Seychelles predatory bush-cricket (Seselphisis visenda)
- Jambila seedpod shieldback (Thoracistus jambila)
- Seedpod shieldback (Thoracistus semeniphagus)
- Inflated seedpod shieldback (Thoracistus thyraeus)
- Throscodectes xederoides
- Throscodectes xiphos
- Adriatic marmored bush-cricket (Zeuneriana marmorata)

==== Phaneropterids ====
Species

- Tree winter katydid (Brinckiella arboricola)
- Cyprian plump bush-cricket (Isophya mavromoustakisi)
- Epiros bright bush-cricket (Poecilimon gracilioides)
- Paros bright bush-cricket (Poecilimon paros)
- Pindos bright bush-cricket (Poecilimon pindos)
- Soulion bright bush-cricket (Poecilimon soulion)

Subspecies

- Isophya longicaudata longicaudata

=== Hymenoptera ===
- Ammobates melectoides
- Andrena stepposa
- Bombus brachycephalus
- Crotch's bumble bee (Bombus crotchii)
- Bombus dahlbomii
- Bombus fraternus
- Bombus haueri
- Bombus inexspectatus
- Bombus reinigiellus
- Bombus steindachneri
- Colletes merceti
- Colletes sierrensis
- Colletes wolfi
- Dasypoda frieseana
- Flavipanurgus granadensis
- Halictus carinthiacus
- Halictus microcardia
- Lasioglossum breviventre

=== Lepidoptera ===
Lepidoptera comprises moths and butterflies. There are 51 species in the order Lepidoptera assessed as endangered.

==== Swallowtail butterflies ====
- Graphium levassori
- Apo Swallowtail (Graphium sandawanum)
- Queen Alexandra's birdwing (Ornithoptera alexandrae)
- Wallace's golden birdwing (Ornithoptera croesus)
- Southern tailed birdwing (Ornithoptera meridionalis)
- Papilio aristophontes
- Luzon peacock swallowtail (Papilio chikae)
- Homerus swallowtail (Papilio homerus)
- Papilio moerneri

==== Lycaenids ====
- Illidge's ant blue (Acrodipsas illidgei)
- Cloud copper (Aloeides nubilus)
- Arawacus aethesa
- Joiceya praeclarus
- Nirodia belphegor
- Orachrysops niobe
- Dickson's copper (Oxychaeta dicksoni)
- Bathurst copper (Paralucia spinifera)
- Vogel's blue (Plebejus vogelii)
- Zullich's blue (Plebejus zullichi)
- Poecilmitis rileyi
- Poecilmitis swanepoeli
- Mesopotamian blue (Polyommatus dama)
- Piedmont anomalous blue (Polyommatus humedasae)
- Theresia's blue (Polyommatus theresiae)
- Fatma's blue (Pseudophilotes fatma)
- Wallengren's copper (Trimenia wallengrenii)

==== Nymphalids ====
- Comoro friar (Amauris comorana)
- Atlas grayling (Arethusana aksouali)
- Biak dark crow (Euploea albicosta)
- Murphy's crow (Euploea caespes)
- Seychelles crow (Euploea mitra)
- Biak threespot crow (Euploea tripunctata)
- Karpathos grayling (Hipparchia christenseni)
- Ponza grayling (Hipparchia sbordonii)
- Hewitson's small tree-nymph (Ideopsis hewitsonii)
- Moroccan wall brown (Lasiommata meadewaldoi)
- Halicarnas brown (Maniola halicarnassus)
- Kuekenthal's yellow tiger (Parantica kuekenthali)
- Biak tiger (Parantica marcia)
- Milagros' tiger (Parantica milagros)
- Father Schoenig's chocolate (Parantica schoenigi)
- Bonthain tiger (Parantica sulewattan)
- Timor yellow tiger (Parantica timorica)
- Madeiran speckled wood (Pararge xiphia)
- Pseudochazara amymone
- Pseudochazara euxina
- Schneider's surprise (Tiradelphe schneideri)

==== Other Lepidoptera species ====
- Madeiran brimstone (Gonepteryx maderensis)
- Black grass-dart butterfly (Ocybadistes knightorum)
- Canary Islands Large White (Pieris cheiranthi)
- Fabulous green sphinx moth (Tinostoma smaragditis)

=== Beetles ===
There are 72 beetle species assessed as endangered.

==== Dytiscids ====
- Agabus clypealis
- Agabus discicollis
- Agabus hozgargantae
- Deronectes aljibensis
- Graptodytes delectus
- Hydrotarsus pilosus
- Rhantus alutaceus
- Rhithrodytes agnus

==== Stag beetles ====
- Colophon barnardi
- Colophon eastmani
- Colophon haughtoni
- Colophon thunbergi
- Colophon whitei
- Dorcus alexisi

==== Geotrupids ====
- Ceratophyus martinezi
- Ceratophyus rossii
- Thorectes balearicus
- Thorectes baraudi
- Thorectes castillanus
- Thorectes catalonicus
- Thorectes chersinus
- Thorectes coiffaiti
- Thorectes distinctus
- Thorectes hernandezi
- Thorectes hispanus
- Thorectes orocantabricus
- Thorectes punctatissimus
- Thorectes punctatolineatus
- Thorectes puncticollis
- Thorectes sardous
- Thorectes variolipennis
- Typhaeus hiostius
- Typhaeus momus

==== Longhorn beetles ====
- Anaglyptus luteofasciatus
- Anaglyptus praecellens
- Crotchiella brachyptera
- Isotomus jarmilae
- Pseudosphegesthes bergeri
- Ropalopus ungaricus
- Stenopterus creticus
- Trichoferus bergeri
- Pitt Island longhorn beetle (Xylotoles costatus)

==== Scarabaeids ====
- Ahermodontus ambrosi
- Ateuchus ambiguus
- Canthonella gomezi
- Yanbaru long-armed scarab beetle (Cheirotonus jambar)
- Cryptocanthon altus
- Cryptocanthon nebulinus
- Cryptocanthon punctatus
- Dichotomius eucranioides
- Dichotomius schiffleri
- Endroedyolus paradoxus
- Heptaulacus gadetinus
- Shadowy chafer (Mellissius adumbratus)
- Nimbus anyerae
- Onoreidium howdeni
- Proagoderus uluguru
- Sarophorus punctatus

==== Other beetle species ====
- Ampedus assingi
- Ampedus quadrisignatus
- Sacramento beetle (Anthicus sacramento)
- Goldstreifiger (Buprestis splendens)
- Columbia river tiger beetle (Cicindela columbica)
- Puritan tiger beetle (Cicindela puritana)
- Eustra honchongensis
- Lichen weevil (Gymnopholus lichenifer)
- Harvengia vietnamita
- Leipaspis pinicola
- Violet click beetle (Limoniscus violaceus)
- Osmoderma cristinae
- Osmoderma italica
- Osmoderma lassallei

=== Odonata ===
Odonata includes dragonflies and damselflies. There are 97 species and 19 subspecies in the order Odonata assessed as endangered.

==== Platystictids ====
- Drepanosticta ceratophora
- Cacao shadowdamsel (Palaemnema baltodanoi)
- Chiriquita shadowdamsel (Palaemnema chiriquita)
- Black-backed shadowdamsel (Palaemnema melanota)
- Palaemnema orientalis
- Reventazón shadowdamsel (Palaemnema reventazoni)
- Sulcosticta striata

==== Platycnemidids ====
Species

- Allocnemis montana
- Arabineura khalidi
- Chlorocnemis sp. nov. A
- Jungle threadtail (Elattoneura caesia)
- Two-spotted threadtail (Elattoneura oculata)
- Liberian riverjack (Mesocnemis tisi)
- Kubusi featherlegs (Metacnemis valida)
- Pilbara threadtail (Nososticta pilbara)
- Risiocnemis antoniae

Subspecies

- Coeliccia flavicauda masakii
- Coeliccia ryukyuensis amamii
- Coeliccia ryukyuensis ryukyuensis

==== Megapodagrionids ====
- Heteragrion calendulum
- Jamaican hypolestes (Hypolestes clara)
- Philogenia monotis
- Rhipidolestes okinawanus
- Paria wood elf (Sciotropis lattkei)

==== Gomphids ====
Species

- Asiagomphus coreanus
- Asiagomphus yayeyamensis
- Epigomphus armatus
- Humped knobtail (Epigomphus camelus)
- Guatemalan knobtail (Epigomphus clavatus)
- Horned knobtail (Epigomphus corniculatus)
- Donnelly's knobtail (Epigomphus donnellyi)
- Flint's knobtail (Epigomphus flinti)
- Limón knobtail (Epigomphus houghtoni)
- Maya knobtail (Epigomphus maya)
- Paulson's knobtail (Epigomphus paulsoni)
- Alajuela knobtail (Epigomphus subsimilis)
- Tuxtla knobtail (Epigomphus sulcatistyla)
- Cartago knobtail (Epigomphus verticicornis)
- Westfall's knobtail (Epigomphus westfalli)
- Chinese tiger (Gomphidia kelloggi)
- Rivulet tiger (Gomphidia pearsoni)
- Cherokee clubtail (Gomphus consanguis)
- Columbia clubtail (Gomphus lynnae)
- Microgomphus wijaya
- Notogomphus cottarellii
- Maathai's longleg (Notogomphus maathaiae)
- Notogomphus ruppeli
- Southern snaketail (Ophiogomphus australis)
- Edmund's snaketail (Ophiogomphus edmundo)
- Ris's sanddragon (Progomphus risi)
- Bristle-tipped sanddargon (Progomphus tennesseni)
- Elusive sanddragon (Progomphus zephyrus)

Subspecies

- Asiagomphus amamiensis amamiensis
- Asiagomphus amamiensis okinawanus
- Stylogomphus ryukyuanus asatol
- Stylogomphus ryukyuanus watanabei

==== Calopterygids ====
Species

- Caliphaea angka
- Glittering demoiselle (Calopteryx exul)
- Clear-winged demoiselle (Calopteryx hyalina)
- Syrian demoiselle (Calopteryx syriaca)
- Clearwing (Sapho puella)
- Cameroon sparklewing (Umma mesumbei)

Subspecies

- Matrona basilaris japonica

==== Coenagrionids ====
Species

- Acanthagrion williamsoni
- Aciagrion fasciculare
- Coenagriocnemis rufipes
- Drepanoneura donnellyi
- Mesamphiagrion demarmelsi
- Mesamphiagrion gaudiimontanum
- Mesamphiagrion nataliae
- Mesamphiagrion santainense
- Blue-and-orange threadtail (Microneura caligata)
- Pseudagrion arabicum
- Badplaas sprite (Pseudagrion inopinatum)
- Telebasis flammeola

Subspecies

- Pseudagrion torridum hulae

==== Aeshnids ====
Species

- Cretan spectre (Boyeria cretensis)
- Oligoaeschna kunigamiensis
- Rhionaeschna caligo
- Rhionaeschna galapagoensis
- Staurophlebia bosqi

Subspecies

- Planaeschna ishigakiana ishigakiana
- Planaeschna ishigakiana nagaminei
- Planaeschna risi sakishimana

==== Libellulids ====
Species

- Fruhstorfer's junglewatcher (Hylaeothemis fruhstorferi)
- Micrathyria coropinae
- Sympetrum maculatum
- Tetrathemis yerburii
- Thalassothemis marchali
- Urothemis thomasi

Subspecies

- Leucorrhinia intermedia ijimai
- Orthetrum poecilops miyajimaense
- Urothemis thomasi thomasi

==== Other Odonata ====
Species

- Allolestes maclachlani
- Dune ringtail (Austrolestes minjerriba)
- Bayadera ishigakiana
- Chlorogomphus okinawensis
- Amatola malachite (Chlorolestes apricans)
- Greek goldenring (Cordulegaster helladica)
- Hemicordulia apoensis
- Hemicordulia ogasawarensis
- Ancient greenling (Hemiphlebia mirabilis)
- Idionyx galeata
- Libellago balus
- Macromia kubokaiya
- Beautiful petaltail (Petalura pulcherrima)
- Metropolitan redspot (Phyllopetalia altarensis)
- Hispaniolan malachite (Phylolestes ethelae)
- Procordulia lompobatang
- Rhinocypha hageni
- Rhinocypha orea
- Rhinocypha uenoi

Subspecies

- Chlorogomphus brunneus brunneus
- Buchholz' cordulegaster (Cordulegaster helladica buchholzi)
- Cordulegaster helladica helladica
- Hemicordulia mindana nipponica

=== Other insect species ===
- Mccarthy's plant-louse (Acizzia mccarthyi)
- Anisolabis scotti
- Giant torrent midge (Edwardsina gigantea)
- Seychelles winged stick insect (Graeffea seychellensis)
- Sugarfoot moth fly (Nemapalpus nearcticus)
- Canary dwarf mantis (Pseudoyersinia canariensis)
- Large blue lake mayfly (Tasmanophlebia lacuscoerulei)

== See also ==
- Lists of IUCN Red List endangered species
- List of least concern arthropods
- List of near threatened arthropods
- List of vulnerable arthropods
- List of critically endangered arthropods
- List of recently extinct arthropods
- List of data deficient arthropods
