= Trimerotropis occulens =

Conservation status
- Endangered (IUCN 2.3)

Scientific classification
- Kingdom: Animalia
- Phylum: Arthropoda
- Class: Insecta
- Order: Orthoptera
- Suborder: Caelifera
- Family: Acrididae
- Genus: Trimerotropis
- Species: T. occulens

Binomial name
- Trimerotropis occulens Otte, 1984

Species of grasshopper

Trimerotropis occulens (the Lompoc grasshopper) is a species of grasshopper in the family Acrididae. It is endemic to the United States.
