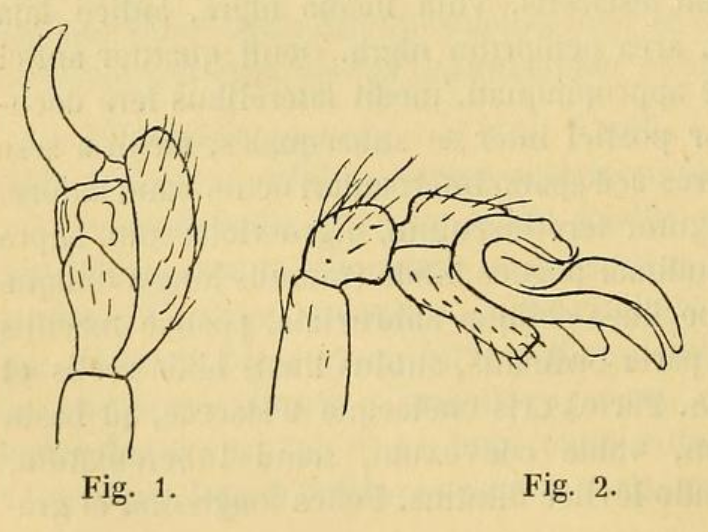
- S. braueri

Scientific classification
- Kingdom: Animalia
- Phylum: Arthropoda
- Subphylum: Chelicerata
- Class: Arachnida
- Order: Araneae
- Infraorder: Araneomorphae
- Family: Theridiidae
- Genus: Seycellesa; Koçak & Kemal, 2008

Type species
- Theridion braueri Simon, 1898

Species
- S. braueri (Simon, 1898)

Synonyms
- Genus: Robertia Saaristo, 2006 nec Boonstra, 1948; Species: Theridion braueri Simon, 1898; Theridion purifum Roberts, 1978; Robertia braueri (Simon, 1898)

= Seycellesa =

Genus of spiders

Seycellesa is a genus of spiders in the family Theridiidae. It consists of only its type species: Seycellesa braueri, which is endangered and endemic to the Seychelles.

== Taxonomic history ==
The type species was initially described in 1898 by the French naturalist Eugène Simon, who placed it in the genus Theridion. He chose the specific epithet braueri to honor A. Brauer at the University of Marburg. His description was based on a male specimen.

British arachnologist Michael Roberts described a junior synonym, T. purifum, in 1978. The specific name was described as "an arbitrary combination of letters". His description was based on a female specimen. Michael Saaristo synonymized T. purifum with T. braueri in 1999.

In 2006, Saaristo circumscribed a new genus for T. braueri. He named it Robertia after Michael Roberts. However, that generic name was invalid due to a senior homonym: the synapsid genus Robertia. In 2008, Ahmet Koçak and Muhabbet Kemal created a nomen novum for this genus: Seycellesa.

== Distribution ==
S. braueri is endemic to the Seychelles, where it is found on the islands of Mahé and Silhouette at elevations of 300 to 500 m (980 to 1,640 ft). The type locality for S. braueri is Mahé; the type locality for the junior synonym S. purifum is Morne Seychellois, central Mahé. Its habitat is woodland.

== Species description ==
The total length of the female S. braueri is 6.5 mm (0.26 in); males are smaller, with a length of 2.5 mm (0.098 in). The carapace is yellow-orange in color and has a dark border and marking along its median. The color of the chelicerae, maxillae, labium, and sternum is black-tinted yellow. The opisthosoma is spherical and the chelicerae have two anterior teeth.

== Conservation status ==
The IUCN Red List considers S. braueri to be endangered. Its habitat is deteriorating due to invasive plants like Cinnamomum verum. Its extent of occurrence is 300 km^{2} (120 sq mi) and its area of occupancy is 50 km^{2} (19 sq mi).
