= Eucarlia =

Scientific classification
- Kingdom: Animalia
- Phylum: Arthropoda
- Subphylum: Myriapoda
- Class: Diplopoda
- Order: Spirobolida
- Family: Pachybolidae
- Genus: Eucarlia; Brolemann, 1913

Species
- Eucarlia alluaudi; Eucarlia haemorrhantus; Eucarlia hoffmani; Eucarlia mauriesi; Eucarlia uncinatus; Eucarlia urophora

Genus of millipedes

Eucarlia is a genus of spirobolidan millipedes containing six species; most of which are endemic to the island nation of Seychelles, and one native to the Indonesian island of Sulawesi. Four of the Seychelles species have been assessed by the IUCN Red List as either endangered, critically endangered, or extinct.

== Description ==
Eucarlia species range from about 20 to 45 mm (0.79 to 1.77 in) in length and possess 35-55 body segments with females being slightly longer than males. The body colors include solid gray, brown, and orange and some possess a mid-dorsal stripe.

== Species ==
Species	Authority	IUCN status	Distribution	Notes
Eucarlia alluaudi	(Brolemann, 1896)	Extinct	Seychelles (Marianne Island)	Only known from the holotype collected in 1892
Eucarlia haemorrhantus	(Pocock, 1893)	Not assessed		
Eucarlia hoffmani	Golovatch & Korsos, 1984	Endangered	Seychelles	
Eucarlia mauriesi	Golovatch & Korsos, 1984	Critically Endangered	Seychelles	
Eucarlia uncinatus	(Brolemann, 1917)	Not assessed	Sulawesi	
Eucarlia urophora	(Pocock, 1893)	Endangered	Seychelles	Possesses a long extension of the telson
