= Prida sechellensis =

Scientific classification
- Kingdom: Animalia
- Phylum: Arthropoda
- Subphylum: Chelicerata
- Class: Arachnida
- Order: Araneae
- Infraorder: Araneomorphae
- Family: Oonopidae
- Genus: Prida; Saaristo, 2001
- Species: P. sechellensis

Binomial name
- Prida sechellensis (Benoit, 1979)

Species of spider

Prida sechellensis is a species of spiders in the family Oonopidae. It was first described by Benoit in 1979, and was moved to its present genus in 2001 by Saaristo. As of 2017, it is the sole species in the genus Prida. It is found in the Seychelles.
