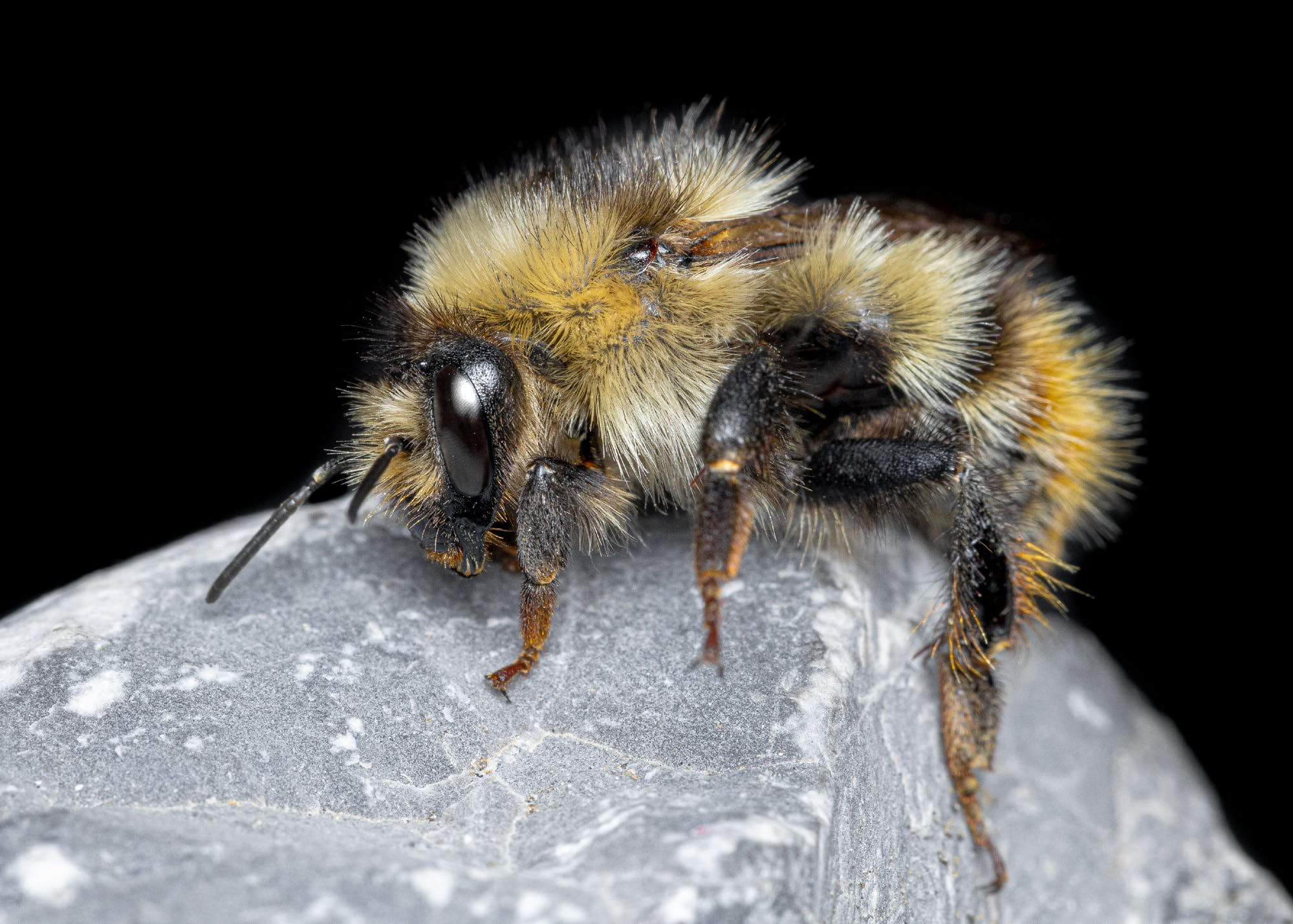

Conservation status
- Endangered (IUCN 3.1)

Scientific classification
- Kingdom: Animalia
- Phylum: Arthropoda
- Clade: Pancrustacea
- Class: Insecta
- Order: Hymenoptera
- Family: Apidae
- Genus: Bombus
- Subgenus: Thoracobombus
- Species: B. inexspectatus

Binomial name
- Bombus inexspectatus (Tkalcu, 1963)

Synonyms
- Agrobombus inexspectatus (Tkalcu, 1963)

= Bombus inexspectatus =

Species of bee

Bombus inexspectatus is an endangered species of bumblebee native to Europe.

== Distribution and habitat ==
Bombus inexspectatus occurs in Austria, France, Italy, Spain, and Switzerland. The species inhabits high mountain habitats, especially on the southern slopes, in the alpine and subalpine zone in open areas and on the edges of woodland habitat. It occurs in the Cordillera Cantábrica and the Alps. populations may also occur in the Pyrenees, but its presence there is as yet unconfirmed. This distribution is fragmented, and it is likely that B. inexspectatus is a relictual species that once occurred more widely but became limited to mountaintops as conditions changed.

== Ecology ==
Like some other bumblebee taxa, this species is a social parasite. It does not produce its own worker bees and cannot maintain its own colony; instead, individuals live inside the nest of another bumblebee species. B. inexspectatus lives inside the nest of the more common red-shanked bumblebee (Bombus ruderarius). It is supported by its host, as it cannot produce the wax used to build nests and it does not have pollen baskets on its legs. Thus, it is an obligate social parasite, one that must be supported by another species, rather than a facultative parasite, which can live on its own if necessary. This species has apparently evolved obligate parasitism separately from the few other taxa that practice it, such as the cuckoo bees (subgenus Psithyrus).

This bee is closely related to its host, a condition known as Emery's rule. In fact, the two are sometimes confused because they look so similar. B. ruderarius is the only known host for this species, but there may be others.

== Conservation ==
The species has been classified as Endangered on the IUCN Red List. The bee is already rare with geographically separated populations, and available high-mountain habitat is shrinking due to climate change. Its parasitic lifestyle also makes it susceptible to indirect damage from population reductions in its host species.
