= Deronectes aljibensis =

Conservation status
- Endangered (IUCN 2.3)

Scientific classification
- Kingdom: Animalia
- Phylum: Arthropoda
- Class: Insecta
- Order: Coleoptera
- Suborder: Adephaga
- Family: Dytiscidae
- Genus: Deronectes
- Species: D. aljibensis

Binomial name
- Deronectes aljibensis Fery & Fresneda, 1988

Species of beetle

Deronectes aljibensis is a species of beetle in family Dytiscidae. It is endemic to Spain.
