= Monolistra spinosissima =

Conservation status
- Endangered (IUCN 2.3)

Scientific classification
- Kingdom: Animalia
- Phylum: Arthropoda
- Class: Malacostraca
- Order: Isopoda
- Family: Sphaeromatidae
- Genus: Monolistra
- Species: M. spinosissima

Binomial name
- Monolistra spinosissima (Racovitza, 1929)

Species of crustacean

Monolistra spinosissima is a species of isopod in the family Sphaeromatidae.

The IUCN conservation status of Monolistra spinosissima is "EN", endangered. The species faces a high risk of extinction in the near future. The IUCN status was reviewed in 1996.
