= Engaeus phyllocercus =

Conservation status
- Endangered (IUCN 3.1)

Scientific classification
- Kingdom: Animalia
- Phylum: Arthropoda
- Class: Malacostraca
- Order: Decapoda
- Suborder: Pleocyemata
- Family: Parastacidae
- Genus: Engaeus
- Species: E. phyllocercus

Binomial name
- Engaeus phyllocercus Smith & Schuster, 1913

Species of crayfish

Engaeus phyllocercus, the Narracan burrowing crayfish, is a species of crayfish in the family Parastacidae. It is endemic to Australia.

== Sources ==
- Doran, N. & Horwitz, P. 2010. Engaeus phyllocercus. IUCN Red List of Threatened Species 2010. Retrieved 5 February 2017.
