= Colophon whitei =

Conservation status
- Endangered (IUCN 2.3)

Scientific classification
- Kingdom: Animalia
- Phylum: Arthropoda
- Class: Insecta
- Order: Coleoptera
- Suborder: Polyphaga
- Infraorder: Scarabaeiformia
- Family: Lucanidae
- Genus: Colophon
- Species: C. whitei

Binomial name
- Colophon whitei Barnard, 1931 (1932)

Species of beetle

Colophon whitei is a species of beetle in family Lucanidae. It is endemic to South Africa.

It is on the 2006 IUCN Red List of Threatened Species.
