= Ilybius hozgargantae =

Conservation status
- Endangered (IUCN 2.3)

Scientific classification
- Kingdom: Animalia
- Phylum: Arthropoda
- Class: Insecta
- Order: Coleoptera
- Suborder: Adephaga
- Family: Dytiscidae
- Genus: Ilybius
- Species: I. hozgargantae

Binomial name
- Ilybius hozgargantae (Burmeister, 1983)

Synonyms
- Agabus hozgargantae

Species of beetle

Ilybius hozgargantae is a species of beetle in family Dytiscidae. It is endemic to Spain.
