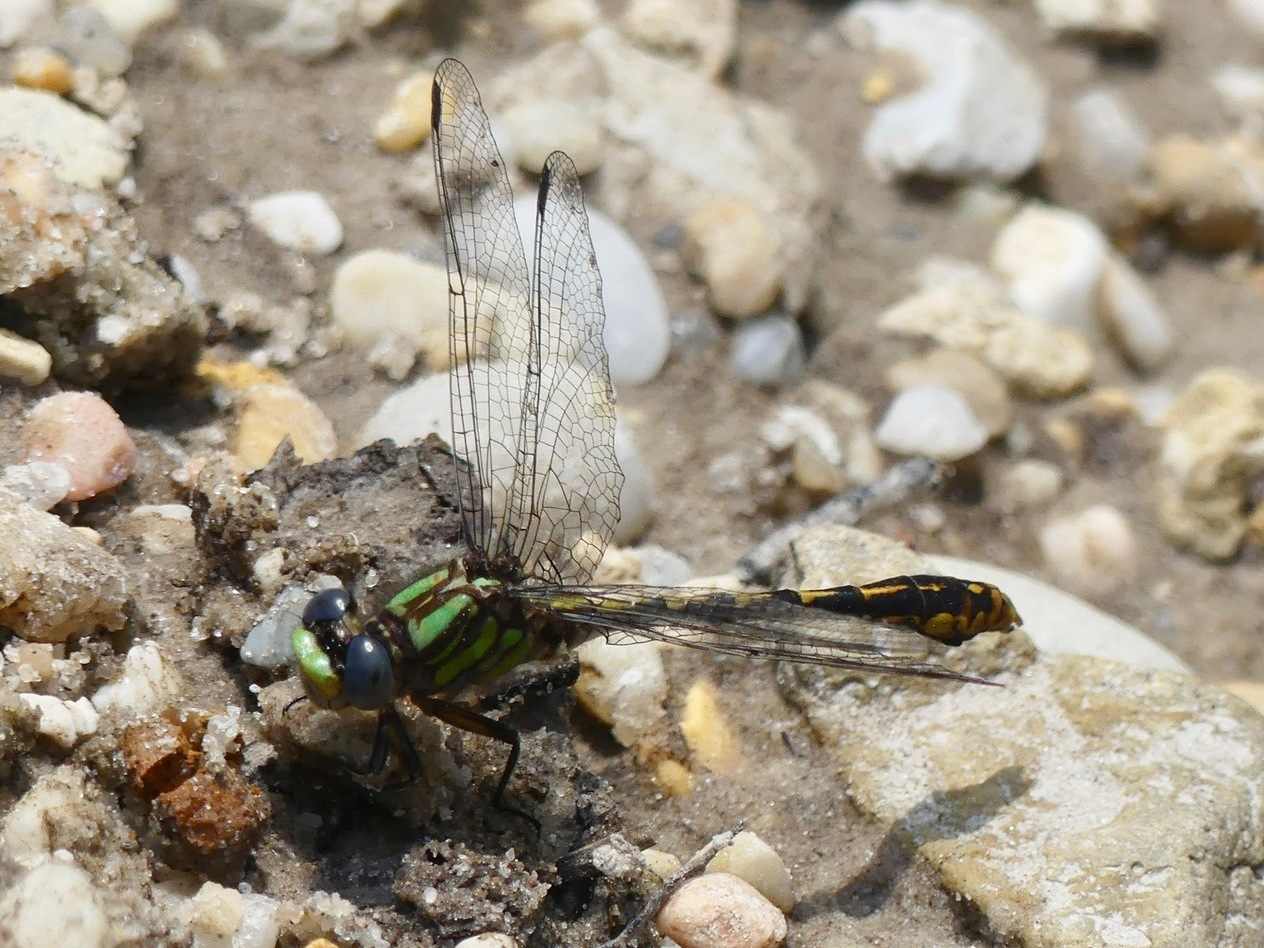

Conservation status
- Near Threatened (IUCN 3.1)

Scientific classification
- Kingdom: Animalia
- Phylum: Arthropoda
- Class: Insecta
- Order: Odonata
- Infraorder: Anisoptera
- Family: Gomphidae
- Genus: Ophiogomphus
- Species: O. australis

Binomial name
- Ophiogomphus australis Carle, 1992

= Ophiogomphus australis =

Species of dragonfly

Ophiogomphus australis, the southern snaketail, is a dragonfly in the genus Ophiogomphus ("snaketails"), in the family Gomphidae ("clubtails"). Ophiogomphus australis is found in North America.

The IUCN conservation status of Ophiogomphus australis is "NT", Near Threatened. The population is decreasing.
