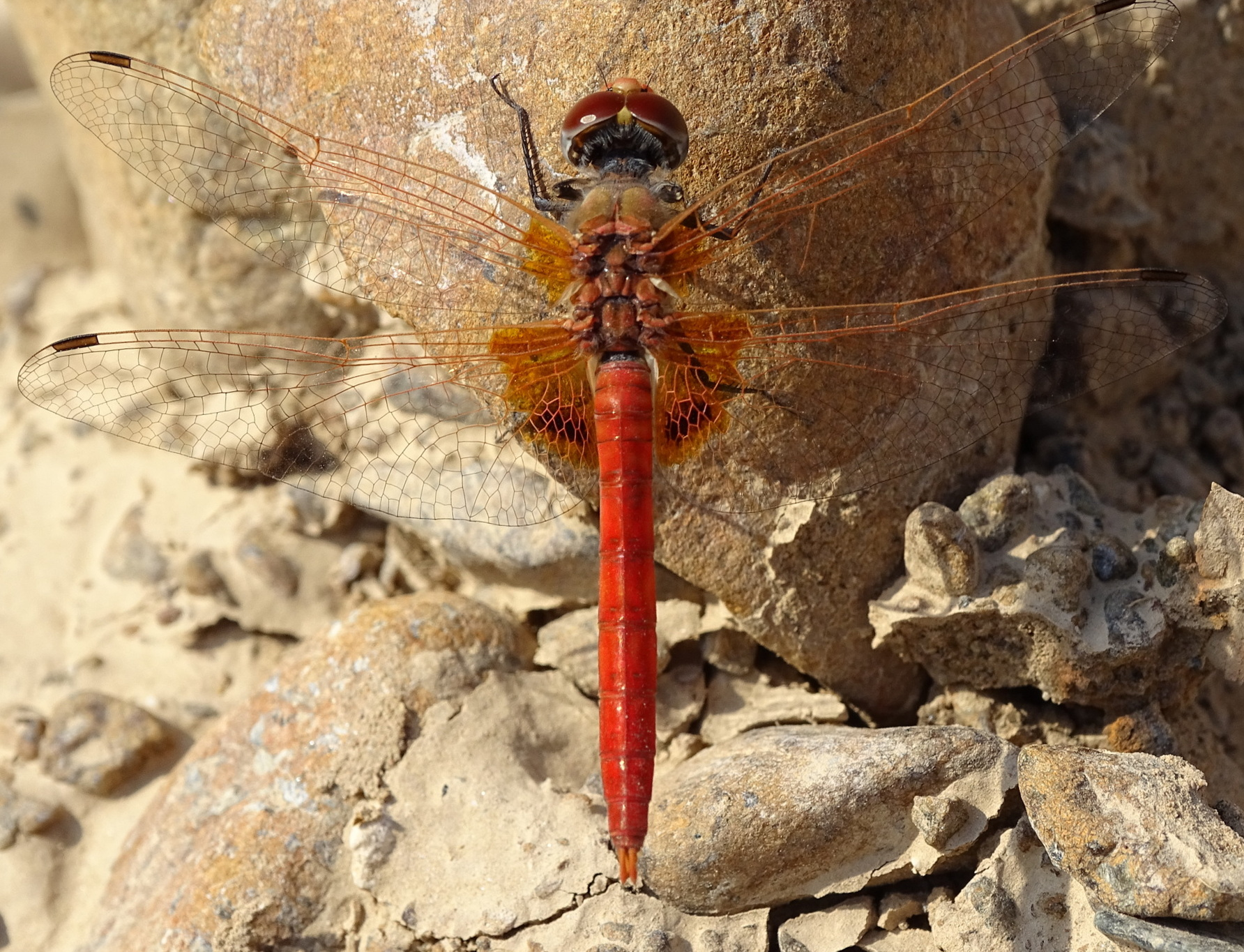

Conservation status
- Endangered (IUCN 3.1)

Scientific classification
- Kingdom: Animalia
- Phylum: Arthropoda
- Class: Insecta
- Order: Odonata
- Infraorder: Anisoptera
- Family: Libellulidae
- Genus: Urothemis
- Species: U. thomasi

Binomial name
- Urothemis thomasi Longfield, 1932

= Urothemis thomasi =

Species of dragonfly

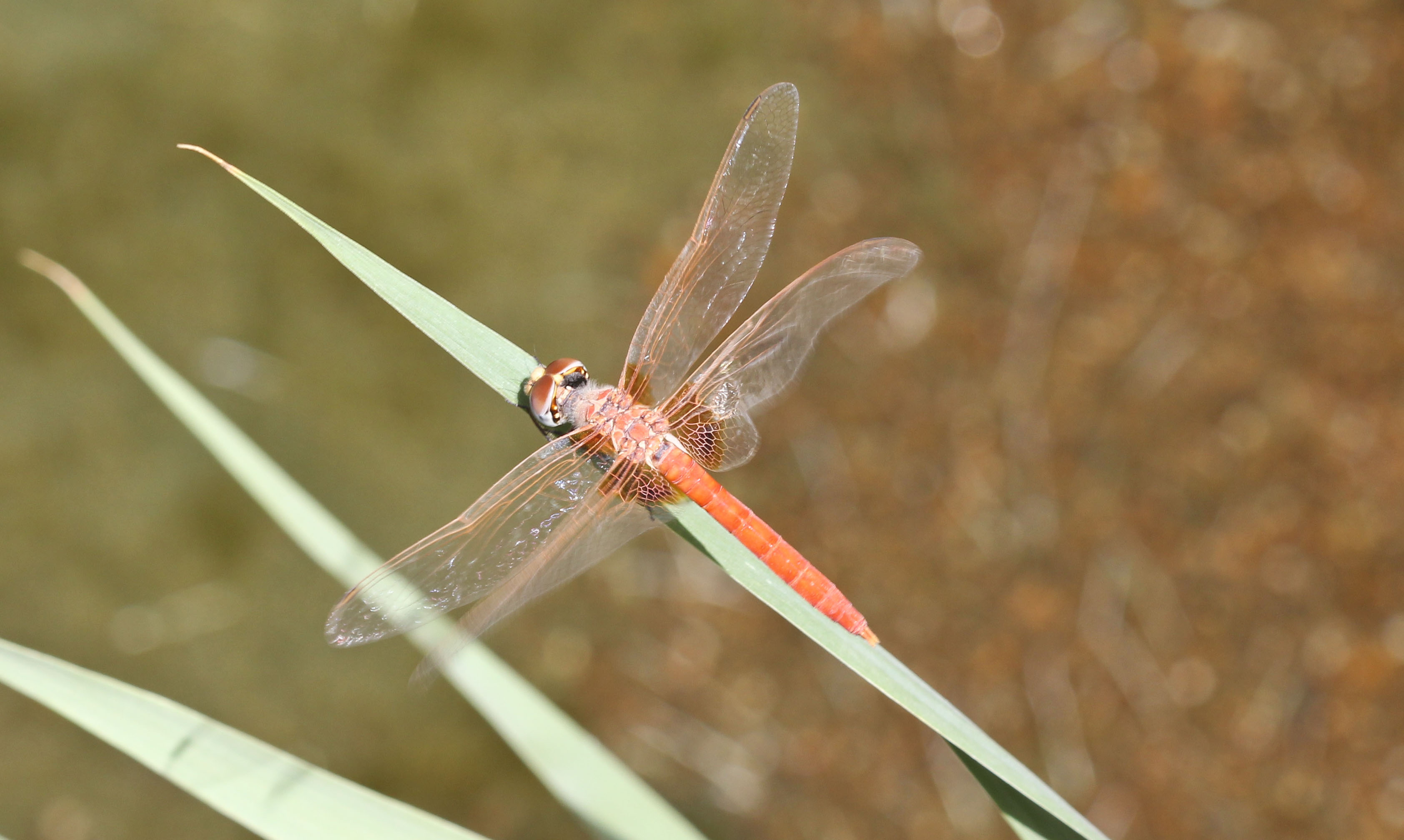
Urothemis thomasi from United Arab Emirates

Urothemis thomasi, the Omani dragonfly, is a species of dragonfly in the family Libellulidae. It is found in Oman and possibly Somalia, and was recently discovered in the United Arab Emirates. Its natural habitats are rivers and freshwater springs. It was last known to be threatened by habitat loss as of 2014.
