= Dugastella marocana =

Conservation status
- Endangered (IUCN 3.1)

Scientific classification
- Domain: Eukaryota
- Kingdom: Animalia
- Phylum: Arthropoda
- Class: Malacostraca
- Order: Decapoda
- Suborder: Pleocyemata
- Infraorder: Caridea
- Family: Atyidae
- Genus: Dugastella
- Species: D. marocana

Binomial name
- Dugastella marocana Bouvier, 1912

Species of crustacean

Dugastella marocana is a species of shrimp from the Atyidae family. It can only be found in rivers and springs in northern Morocco.

It is classed as Endangered, according to the IUCN.
