= Thorectes hispanus =

Conservation status
- Endangered (IUCN 3.1)

Scientific classification
- Kingdom: Animalia
- Phylum: Arthropoda
- Clade: Pancrustacea
- Class: Insecta
- Order: Coleoptera
- Suborder: Polyphaga
- Infraorder: Scarabaeiformia
- Family: Geotrupidae
- Genus: Thorectes
- Species: T. hispanus

Binomial name
- Thorectes hispanus (Reitter, 1892)

Species of beetle

Thorectes hispanus is a species of beetle in the family Geotrupidae. It is endemic to areas of Spain and Portugal.
