= Seselphisis visenda =

Conservation status
- Endangered (IUCN 3.1)

Scientific classification
- Kingdom: Animalia
- Phylum: Arthropoda
- Class: Insecta
- Order: Orthoptera
- Suborder: Ensifera
- Family: Tettigoniidae
- Genus: Seselphisis
- Species: S. visenda

Binomial name
- Seselphisis visenda (Bolivar, 1912)

Species of cricket-like animal

Seselphisis visenda, the Seychelles predatory bush-cricket, is a species of cricket first described by Bolivar in 1912. It is a member of the family Tettigoniidae in the order Orthoptera. It is found in the forests of the islands of Mahé, Silhouette, Praslin and La Digue in the Seychelles.
