= Nanume =

Scientific classification
- Kingdom: Animalia
- Phylum: Arthropoda
- Subphylum: Chelicerata
- Class: Arachnida
- Order: Araneae
- Infraorder: Araneomorphae
- Family: Theridiidae
- Genus: Nanume; Saaristo, 2006
- Species: N. naneum

Binomial name
- Nanume naneum (Roberts, 1983)

Monotypic genus of spiders

Nanume is a monotypic genus of comb-footed spiders containing the single species, Nanume naneum. It was first described by Michael I. Saaristo in 2006, and is found on the Aldabra Atoll.
