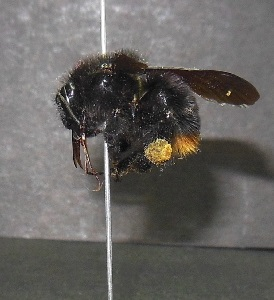

Conservation status
- Endangered (IUCN 3.1)

Scientific classification
- Domain: Eukaryota
- Kingdom: Animalia
- Phylum: Arthropoda
- Class: Insecta
- Order: Hymenoptera
- Family: Apidae
- Genus: Bombus
- Subgenus: Cullumanobombus
- Species: B. brachycephalus

Binomial name
- Bombus brachycephalus Handlirsch, 1888

Synonyms
- Bombus krusemani

= Bombus brachycephalus =

Species of bee

Bombus brachycephalus is a species of bumblebee native to Mexico and Central America. This bee occurs in mountain and highland regions, where it lives in various types of forests. It is active year-round in many areas.

This is an endangered species. Conservationists estimate its current range to be about 27% of its historical range. Threats to the species include the degradation and loss of habitat to agriculture, cattle ranching, urbanization, and mining. It is impacted by the use of insecticides, the loss of the native flora in the region, drought, and invasive species such as the common eastern bumblebee (Bombus impatiens).
