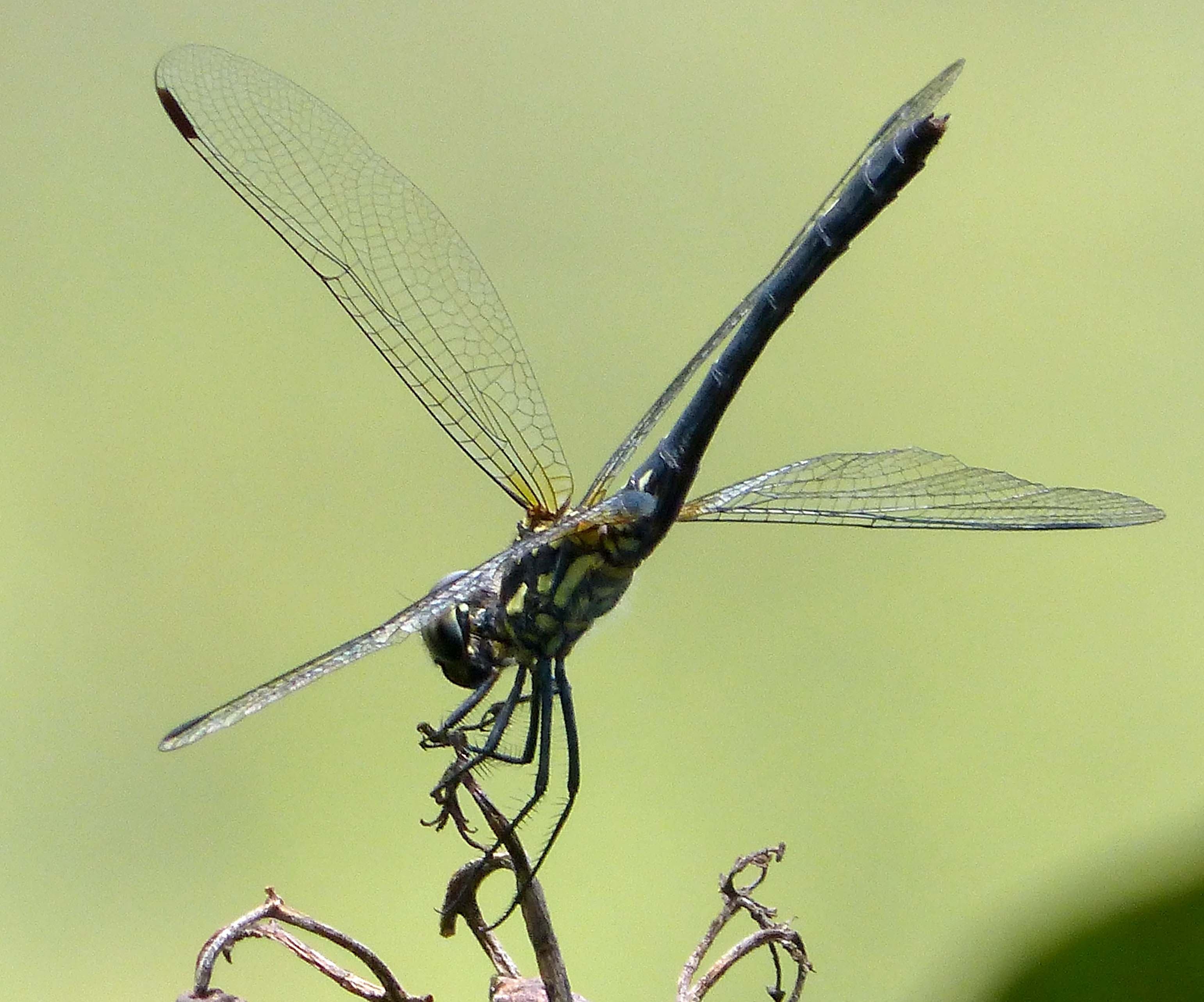

Conservation status
- Endangered (IUCN 3.1)

Scientific classification
- Kingdom: Animalia
- Phylum: Arthropoda
- Class: Insecta
- Order: Odonata
- Infraorder: Anisoptera
- Family: Libellulidae
- Genus: Thalassothemis
- Species: T. marchali

Binomial name
- Thalassothemis marchali (Rambur, 1842)

= Thalassothemis =

Species of dragonfly

Thalassothemis marchali is a species of dragonfly in the family Libellulidae. It is endemic to Mauritius. Its natural habitats are subtropical or tropical moist montane forests and rivers. It is threatened by habitat loss. It is the only species in its genus.
