= Potamonautes gonocristatus =

Conservation status
- Endangered (IUCN 3.1)

Scientific classification
- Kingdom: Animalia
- Phylum: Arthropoda
- Class: Malacostraca
- Order: Decapoda
- Suborder: Pleocyemata
- Infraorder: Brachyura
- Family: Potamonautidae
- Genus: Potamonautes
- Species: P. gonocristatus

Binomial name
- Potamonautes gonocristatus Bott, 1955

Species of crab

Potamonautes gonocristatus is a species of crab in the family Potamonautidae. It is endemic to Lake Kivu, on the border between the Democratic Republic of the Congo and Rwanda.
