= Arcopotamonautes platycentron =

Conservation status
- Endangered (IUCN 3.1)

Scientific classification
- Kingdom: Animalia
- Phylum: Arthropoda
- Class: Malacostraca
- Order: Decapoda
- Suborder: Pleocyemata
- Infraorder: Brachyura
- Family: Potamonautidae
- Genus: Arcopotamonautes
- Species: A. platycentron

Binomial name
- Arcopotamonautes platycentron (Hilgendorf, 1897)

Synonyms
- Telphusa platycentron Hilgendorf, 1897

Species of crab

Arcopotamonautes platycentron is a species of freshwater crab in the family Potamonautidae, which is endemic to Lake Chala in Kenya and Tanzania. It was originally described by Franz Martin Hilgendorf in 1897, as Telphusa platycentron.
