= Notogomphus cottarellii =

Conservation status
- Endangered (IUCN 3.1)

Scientific classification
- Kingdom: Animalia
- Phylum: Arthropoda
- Class: Insecta
- Order: Odonata
- Infraorder: Anisoptera
- Family: Gomphidae
- Genus: Notogomphus
- Species: N. cottarellii

Binomial name
- Notogomphus cottarellii Consiglio, 1978

Species of dragonfly

Notogomphus cottarellii is a species of dragonfly in the family Gomphidae. It is endemic to Ethiopia. Its natural habitats are subtropical or tropical high-altitude grassland and rivers. It is threatened by habitat loss.
