= Agabus clypealis =

Conservation status
- Endangered (IUCN 2.3)

Scientific classification
- Kingdom: Animalia
- Phylum: Arthropoda
- Clade: Pancrustacea
- Class: Insecta
- Order: Coleoptera
- Suborder: Adephaga
- Family: Dytiscidae
- Genus: Agabus
- Species: A. clypealis

Binomial name
- Agabus clypealis (Thomson, 1867)

Species of beetle

Agabus clypealis is a species of beetle in family Dytiscidae. It can be found in Denmark, Germany, Latvia, Poland, Russia, and Sweden.
