= Hispo alboclypea =

Conservation status
- Endangered (IUCN 3.1)

Scientific classification
- Kingdom: Animalia
- Phylum: Arthropoda
- Subphylum: Chelicerata
- Class: Arachnida
- Order: Araneae
- Infraorder: Araneomorphae
- Family: Salticidae
- Genus: Hispo
- Species: H. alboclypea

Binomial name
- Hispo alboclypea Wanless, 1981

Species of spider

Hispo alboclypea is a species of jumping spider (family Salticidae). The species is endemic to Mahé Island and Silhouette Island of Seychelles.
