= Patri david =

Scientific classification
- Kingdom: Animalia
- Phylum: Arthropoda
- Subphylum: Chelicerata
- Class: Arachnida
- Order: Araneae
- Infraorder: Araneomorphae
- Family: Oonopidae
- Genus: Patri; Saaristo, 2001
- Species: P. david

Binomial name
- Patri david (Benoit, 1979)

Synonyms
- Gamasomorpha david Benoit, 1979

Species of spider

Patri david is a species of spiders in the family Oonopidae found in the Seychelles. It was first described in 1979 by Benoit, and moved to its present genus in 2001 by Saaristo. As of 2017, it was the only species in the monotypic genus Patri.
