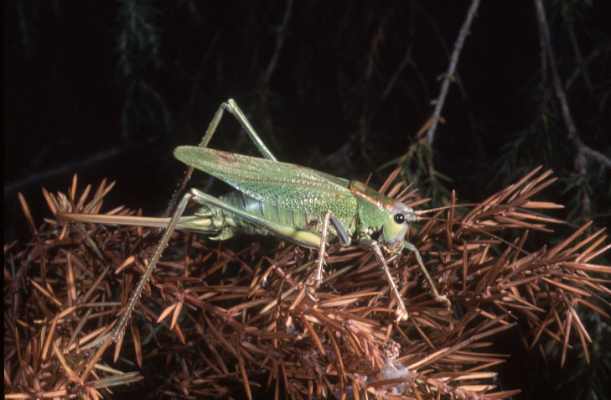
- Callphona palmensis on juniper needles

Conservation status
- Endangered (IUCN 3.1)

Scientific classification
- Kingdom: Animalia
- Phylum: Arthropoda
- Clade: Pancrustacea
- Class: Insecta
- Order: Orthoptera
- Suborder: Ensifera
- Family: Tettigoniidae
- Genus: Calliphona
- Species: C. palmensis

Binomial name
- Calliphona palmensis Bolívar, 1940
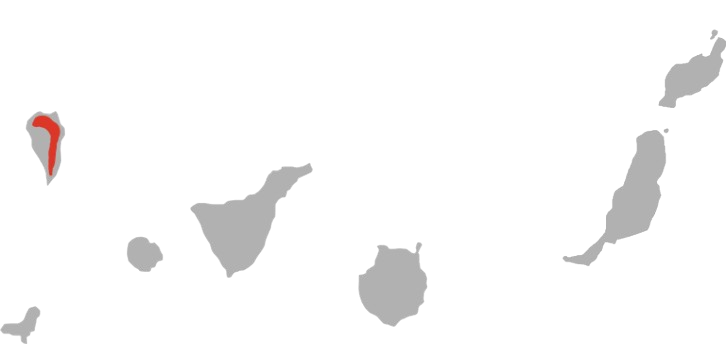

= Calliphona palmensis =

Species of insect

Calliphona palmensis, the Palma green bush-cricket, is a species of insect endemic to La Palma, an island part of the Canary Islands. As of 2016, the species is considered endangered by the IUCN red list, due to ongoing habitat reduction caused by wildfires.

== Background and description ==
Calliphona palmensis is a species of insect in the family Tettigoniidae, commonly known as katydids. The species is endemic to La Palma, an island in the Canary islands archipelago. Like many katydids, C. palmensis are green in color, and have long antennae that originate between their eyes. Among Tettigoniidae, C. palmensis are less saddle shaped, and have medium-sized wings. Calliphona palmensis are referred to as "mediocre fliers" or believed to have no flight – only using their wings to assist jumps. Calliphona palmensis do not have a notably distinct call and are observed to sing most often at dusk or night.

== Taxonomical classification ==
The taxonomic classification of C. palmensis is a subject of debate. In 1982 the genus Calliphona was described for Calliphona konigi. Calliphona palmensis and Calliphona alluaudi were added to Calliphona in 1893 and 1940, respectively. Bolívar (1940, 1991) proposed that Calliphona should be separated into two different subgenera, Calliphona for the species kongi, and Calliphonides for the species palmensis and alluaudi. Researchers Holzapfel & Cantrall (1972) conducted an analysis of Tettigoniidaes morphological traits (including male mating songs) and determined that palmensis and alluaudi do not differentiate enough from konigi to warrant a subgenus. This claim was refuted by Pfau & Pfau in 2002, based on their bioacoustics study of Tettigoniidae of both the Canary islands and mainland Europe. It was determined that C. palmensis's stridulation (the high-pitched noise created by rubbing body parts together) was not unique to the insect to warrant it as an identifier. However, the lack of an identifying call did differentiate palmenisis from Calliphona and kongi to support Pfau & Pfau's arguments.

However, Pfau & Pfau did not include an analysis of alluaudi, or other morphological traits of Calliphonias to support their proposed taxonomic trees, thus the taxonomic classification of palmensis remains under the genus Calliphona, and Calliphonias remains as an acknowledgement of palmensis's the relation to alluaudi.

== Habitat ==
Calliphona palmensis is endemic to the La Palma island in the Canary Islands archipelago. Their known area of occupation is estimated to range between 28 km^{2} and 200 km^{2} , although their estimated extent of occurrence ranges up to 400km^{2}. Specifically. C. palmensis can be found in the treetops and shrubs of laurel forests, and humid Canary pine forests.

== Threats and management plans ==
The International Union for Conservation of Nature (IUCN) added C. palmensis to the Red List of Threatened Species in 2016. The species is threatened mainly by increasing wildfire frequencies. These threats also include geological events such as volcanoes, avalanches, and landslides.

Currently, there are no ongoing conservation efforts in place for C. palmensis specifically. However, the species's habitat overlaps with the Caldera de Taburiente National Park (Spanish: Parque Nacional de la Caldera de Taburiente), which has many ongoing fire reduction and prevention programs.
