= Argyrodes chionus =

Conservation status
- Endangered (IUCN 3.1)

Scientific classification
- Domain: Eukaryota
- Kingdom: Animalia
- Phylum: Arthropoda
- Subphylum: Chelicerata
- Class: Arachnida
- Order: Araneae
- Infraorder: Araneomorphae
- Family: Theridiidae
- Genus: Argyrodes
- Species: A. chionus

Binomial name
- Argyrodes chionus Roberts, 1983

Species of spider

Argyrodes chionus is a species of tangle-web spider that is endemic to Aldabra in the Seychelles. It is found in dry shrubland at sea level. It is threatened by habitat deterioration due to sea level rise.
