= Father Schoenig's chocolate =

Conservation status
- Endangered (IUCN 2.3)

Scientific classification
- Kingdom: Animalia
- Phylum: Arthropoda
- Clade: Pancrustacea
- Class: Insecta
- Order: Lepidoptera
- Family: Nymphalidae
- Genus: Parantica
- Species: P. schoenigi

Binomial name
- Parantica schoenigi (Jumalon, 1971)

Species of butterfly

Father Schoenig's chocolate (Parantica schoenigi) is a species of nymphalid butterfly, endemic to the Philippines.
