= Monolistra bolei =

Conservation status
- Endangered (IUCN 2.3)

Scientific classification
- Kingdom: Animalia
- Phylum: Arthropoda
- Class: Malacostraca
- Order: Isopoda
- Family: Sphaeromatidae
- Genus: Monolistra
- Species: M. bolei

Binomial name
- Monolistra bolei (Sket, 1960)

Species of crustacean

Monolistra bolei is a species of isopod in the family Sphaeromatidae.

The IUCN conservation status of Monolistra bolei is "EN", endangered. The species faces a high risk of extinction in the near future. The IUCN status was reviewed in 1996.

== Subspecies ==
These two subspecies belong to the species Monolistra bolei:

- Monolistra bolei bolei Sket, 1960
- Monolistra bolei brevispinosa Sket, 1982
