= Hadrolecocatantops uvinza =

Conservation status
- Endangered (IUCN 3.1)

Scientific classification
- Kingdom: Animalia
- Phylum: Arthropoda
- Class: Insecta
- Order: Orthoptera
- Suborder: Caelifera
- Family: Acrididae
- Genus: Hadrolecocatantops
- Species: H. uvinza

Binomial name
- Hadrolecocatantops uvinza (Jago, 1994)

Species of grasshopper

Hadrolecocatantops uvinza is a species of grasshopper in the family Acrididae. The species is endemic to Tanzania.
