= Pseudagrion arabicum =

Conservation status
- Endangered (IUCN 3.1)

Scientific classification
- Kingdom: Animalia
- Phylum: Arthropoda
- Clade: Pancrustacea
- Class: Insecta
- Order: Odonata
- Suborder: Zygoptera
- Family: Coenagrionidae
- Genus: Pseudagrion
- Species: P. arabicum

Binomial name
- Pseudagrion arabicum Waterston, 1980

Species of damselfly

Pseudagrion arabicum is a species of damselfly in the family Coenagrionidae. It is found in Saudi Arabia and Yemen. Its natural habitat is rivers. It is threatened by habitat loss.
