= Procambarus brazoriensis =

Conservation status
- Endangered (IUCN 3.1)

- Critically Imperiled (NatureServe)

Scientific classification
- Kingdom: Animalia
- Phylum: Arthropoda
- Clade: Pancrustacea
- Class: Malacostraca
- Order: Decapoda
- Suborder: Pleocyemata
- Family: Cambaridae
- Genus: Procambarus
- Species: P. brazoriensis

Binomial name
- Procambarus brazoriensis Albaugh, 1975

Species of crayfish

Procambarus brazoriensis, the Brazoria crayfish, is a species of crayfish which is endemic to Brazoria County, Texas. It is listed as an endangered species on the IUCN Red List.
