= Papilio moerneri =

Conservation status
- Endangered (IUCN 2.3)

Scientific classification
- Kingdom: Animalia
- Phylum: Arthropoda
- Clade: Pancrustacea
- Class: Insecta
- Order: Lepidoptera
- Family: Papilionidae
- Genus: Papilio
- Species: P. moerneri

Binomial name
- Papilio moerneri Aurivillius, 1919

Synonyms
- Chilasa moerneri

Species of butterfly

Papilio moerneri is a rare species of butterfly in the family Papilionidae. It is endemic to New Ireland in Papua New Guinea. It may also occur on New Britain as a second subspecies, P. m. mayrhoferi was described from this island in 1939, but there have been no further confirmed sightings from this part of its range.

== Sources ==
- Müller, C.J.; Böhm, M. (2018). "Chilasa moerneri". IUCN Red List of Threatened Species. 2018 e.T16000A122600216. doi:10.2305/IUCN.UK.2018-2.RLTS.T16000A122600216.en.
