= Ibalonius inscriptus =

Conservation status
- Endangered (IUCN 3.1)

Scientific classification
- Kingdom: Animalia
- Phylum: Arthropoda
- Subphylum: Chelicerata
- Class: Arachnida
- Order: Opiliones
- Family: Podoctidae
- Genus: Ibalonius
- Species: I. inscriptus

Binomial name
- Ibalonius inscriptus Loman, 1902

Synonyms
- Ibalonius bimaculatus Loman, 1902; Paribalonius bimaculatus (Loman, 1902); Paribalonius bimaculatus bimaculatus (Loman, 1902); Paribalonius bimaculatus duplex Roewer, 1923; Paribalonius inscriptus (Loman, 1902)

Species of harvestman/daddy longlegs

Ibalonius inscriptus is a species of harvestmen from the family Podoctidae. The species is endemic to Mahe Island and Silhouette Island of the Seychelles. The species has a synonymous name Ibalonius bimaculatus which as of 2024, remains listed as such on the IUCN database, despite being considered the same species by Arthur Stanley Hirst (1911), as followed in other catalogs and listings (e.g. WCO). Similarly, another form described as Paribalonius bimaculatus duplex Roewer 1923 was also treated as a synonym by Staręga (1992).
