= Crangonyx dearolfi =

Conservation status
- Endangered (IUCN 3.1)

- Imperiled (NatureServe)

Scientific classification
- Kingdom: Animalia
- Phylum: Arthropoda
- Class: Malacostraca
- Order: Amphipoda
- Family: Crangonyctidae
- Genus: Crangonyx
- Species: C. dearolfi

Binomial name
- Crangonyx dearolfi Shoemaker, 1942

Species of crustacean

Crangonyx dearolfi, also known as the Pennsylvania cave amphipod or Pennsylvania cave crangonyctid, is a species of crustacean in the family Crangonyctidae. It is native to the United States, where it is found in caves in Pennsylvania and Maryland.
