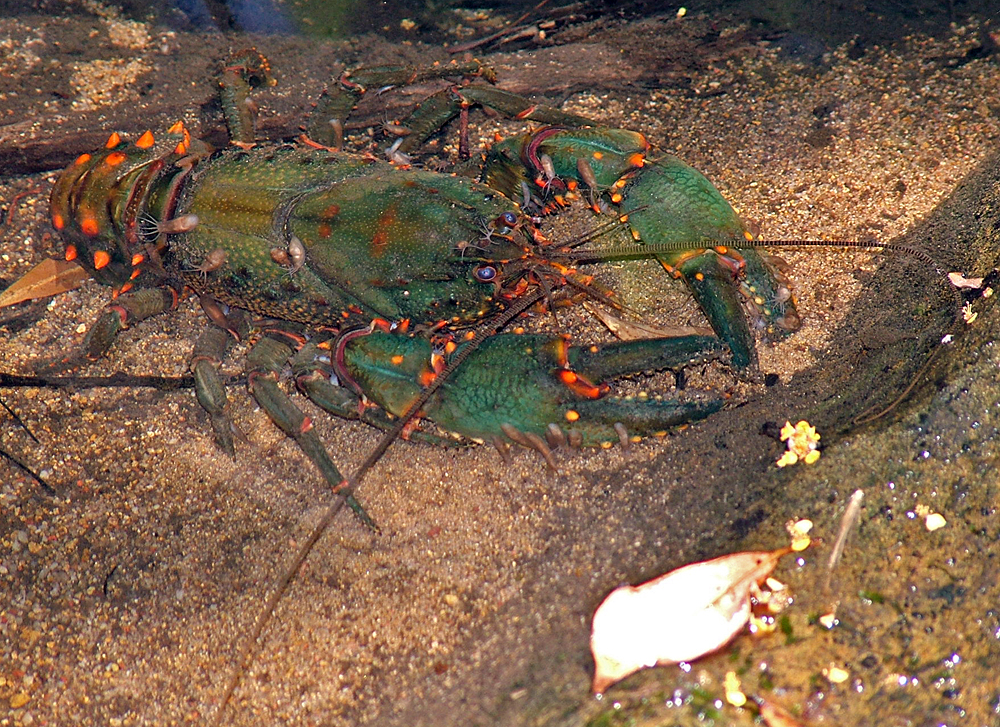
- Euastacus spinifer

Conservation status
- Endangered (IUCN 3.1)

Scientific classification
- Kingdom: Animalia
- Phylum: Arthropoda
- Class: Malacostraca
- Order: Decapoda
- Suborder: Pleocyemata
- Family: Parastacidae
- Genus: Euastacus
- Species: E. crassus

Binomial name
- Euastacus crassus Riek, 1951

= Euastacus crassus =

Species of crayfish

Euastacus crassus is a species of southern crayfish in the family Parastacidae. It is commonly known as the Alpine spiny crayfish.

The IUCN conservation status of Euastacus crassus is "EN", endangered. The species faces a high risk of extinction in the near future. The IUCN status was reviewed in 2010.
