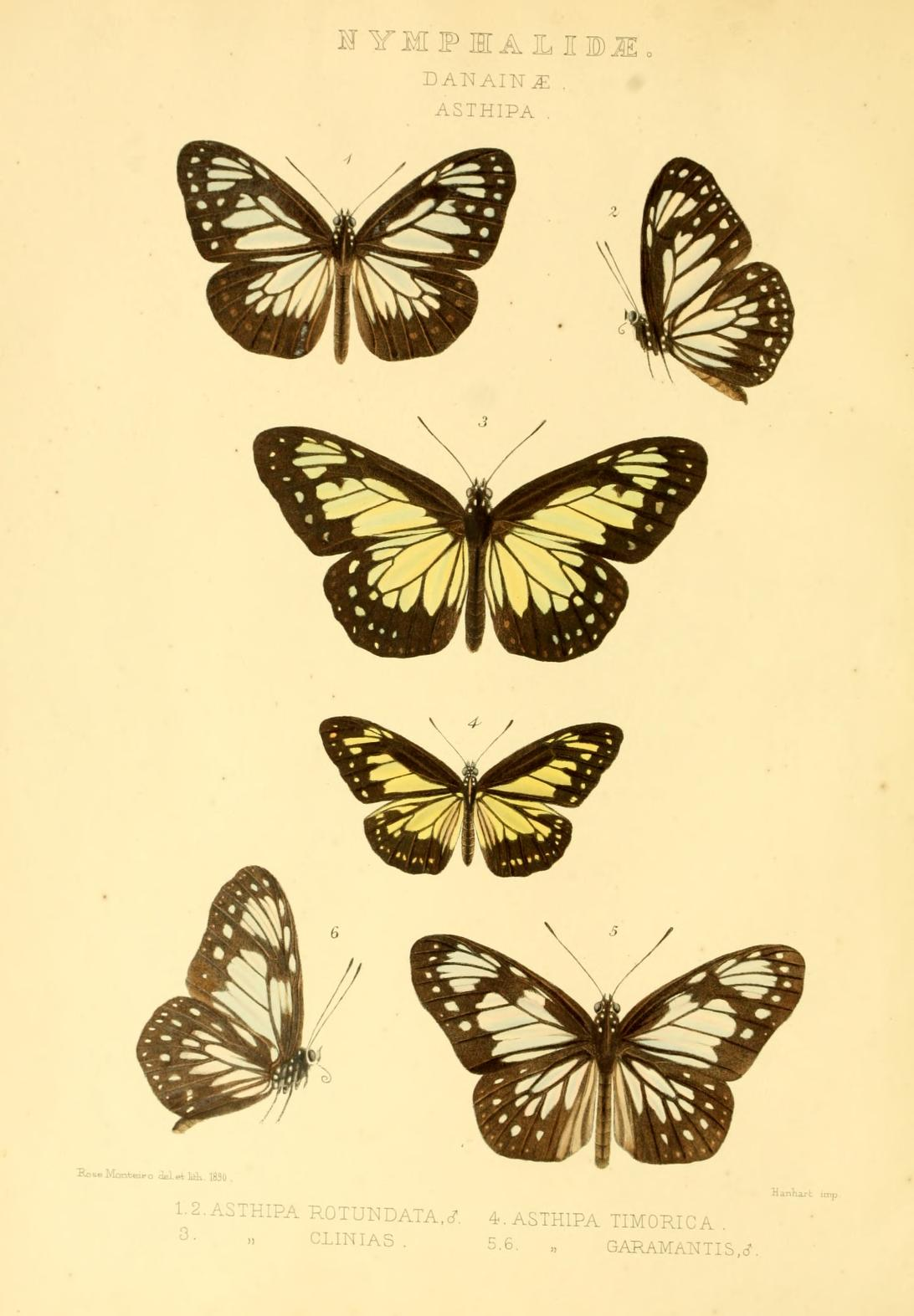
- Rhopalocera exotica, being illustrations of new, rare and unfigured species of butterflies London 1:x, [1-183]. Plate Danainae Asthipa

Conservation status
- Endangered (IUCN 2.3)

Scientific classification
- Kingdom: Animalia
- Phylum: Arthropoda
- Clade: Pancrustacea
- Class: Insecta
- Order: Lepidoptera
- Family: Nymphalidae
- Genus: Parantica
- Species: P. timorica

Binomial name
- Parantica timorica (Grose-Smith, 1887)

= Timor yellow tiger =

Species of butterfly

The Timor yellow tiger (Parantica timorica) is a species of nymphalid butterfly in the subfamily Danainae. It is endemic to Timor, Indonesia.
