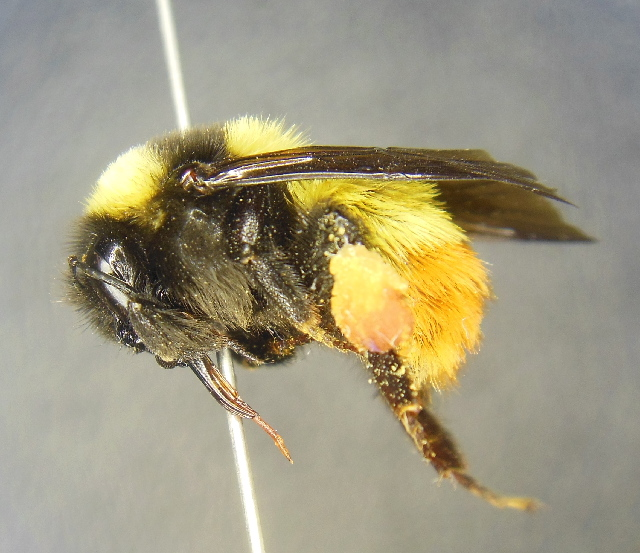

Conservation status
- Endangered (IUCN 3.1)

Scientific classification
- Kingdom: Animalia
- Phylum: Arthropoda
- Class: Insecta
- Order: Hymenoptera
- Family: Apidae
- Genus: Bombus
- Subgenus: Cullumanobombus
- Species: B. haueri

Binomial name
- Bombus haueri Handlirsch, 1888

= Bombus haueri =

Species of bee

Bombus haueri is a species of bumblebee. It is endemic to Mexico.

This bee was known from much of northern and central Mexico, where there were records from at least ten states. Since its description in 1888 it has faced an estimated decline of about 74%, and it now occupies perhaps 10% of its historical range. It was not seen at all between 1991 and 2013, and since then it has only been noted in two Mexican states. It is now an endangered species on the IUCN Red List.

This species lives in mountainous habitat. Its range has been affected by the claiming of land for agriculture and associated chemical pollution. Because it is found in volcanic highlands, volcanic activity may affect the species.
