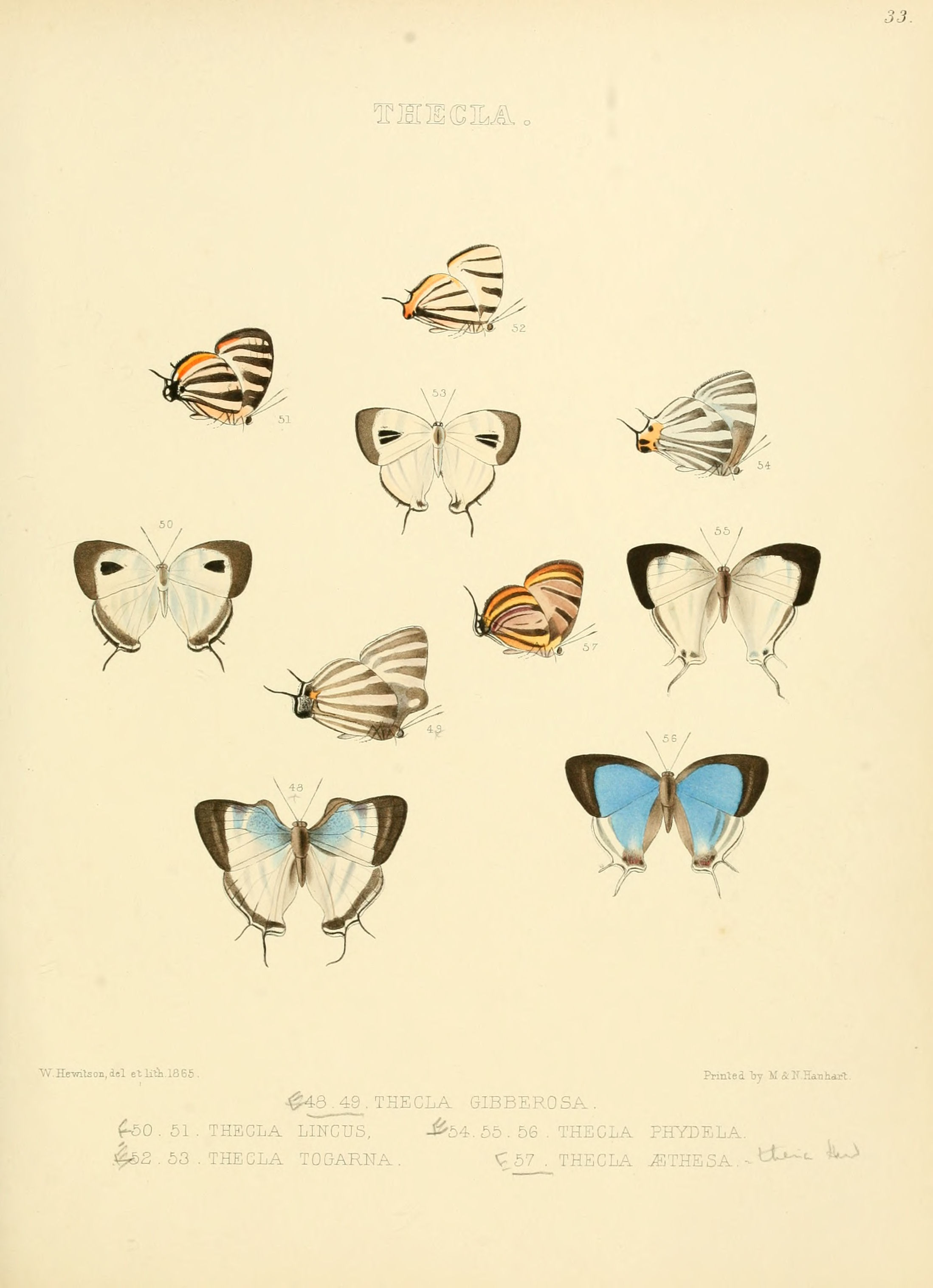
- Arawacus aethesa depicted in Illustrations of diurnal Lepidoptera

Conservation status
- Endangered (IUCN 2.3)

Scientific classification
- Kingdom: Animalia
- Phylum: Arthropoda
- Class: Insecta
- Order: Lepidoptera
- Family: Lycaenidae
- Genus: Arawacus
- Species: A. aethesa

Binomial name
- Arawacus aethesa (Hewitson, 1851)

= Arawacus aethesa =

Species of butterfly

Arawacus aethesa is a species of butterfly in the family Lycaenidae. It is endemic to Brazil.
