= List of freshwater aquarium invertebrate species =

In addition to fish, various kinds of invertebrates are kept in freshwater aquaria. This is a list of invertebrates, animals without a backbone, that are kept in freshwater aquaria by hobby aquarists. Numerous shrimp species of various kinds, crayfish, a number of freshwater snail species, and at least one freshwater clam species are found in freshwater aquaria or '0' salinity water body.

== Crustaceans ==
=== Shrimp ===
Genus	Species	Common name	Size	Care notes	Commercial sources	Image

- Arachnochium kulsiense, Sand shrimp
- Atya gabonensis, African giant shrimp
- Atyaephyra desmarestii, Iberian/European dwarf shrimp
- Atyoida pilipes, Green lace shrimp
- Atyopsis moluccensis, Bamboo Shrimp
- Caridina babaulti
- Caridina caerulea, blue leg Poso shrimp
- Caridina gracilirostris, red-nose shrimp, Pinocchio shrimp
- Caridina cf. gracilirostris, white-nose Shrimp
- Caridina multidentata, Amano shrimp
- Caridina cf. cantonensis
- Caridina cf. serrata, Chinese zebra shrimp
- Caridina sp., Indian Dwarf Shrimp
- Caridina sp., Indian Whitebanded Shrimp
- Caridina woltereckae, Sulawesi harlequin shrimp
- Caridina spongicola, Sulawesi harlequin shrimp
- Caridina dennerli, Sulawesi cardinal shrimp
- Caridina cf. breviata, bumblebee shrimp
- Caridina sp., black midget shrimp
- Caridina serratirostris, Ninja Shrimp
- Caridina thambipillai, sunkist shrimp
- Caridina typus, Australian amano shrimp
- Caridina pareparensis parvidentata, Malawa shrimp
- Caridina simoni, Sri Lankan Dwarf shrimp
- Desmocaris elongata, Guinea Swamp Shrimp
- Euryrhynchus amazoniensis, Amazon zebra shrimp
- Macrobrachium assamensis, Red claw shrimp
- Macrobrachium dayanum, Rusty longarm shrimp
- Macrobrachium eriocheirum, Fuzzy claw shrimp
- Macrobrachium faustinum, Caribbean longarm shrimp
- Macrobrachium lanchesteri, a.k.a. Cryphiops lanchesteri, Riceland prawn
- Micratya poeyi, Caribbean dwarf filter shrimp
- Neocaridina davidi, Wild type cherry shrimp
- Neocaridina palmata, Marbled dwarf shrimp
- Neocaridina cf. zhangjiajiensis
- Palaemonetes kadiakensis, Mississippi grass shrimp
- Palaemonetes ivonicus, amazon glass shrimp
- Palaemonetes paludosus, American ghost (glass, grass) shrimp
- Potamalpheops sp., purple zebra shrimp
- Xiphocaris elongata, Yellow nose shrimp

=== Crayfish ===
Genus	Species	Common name	Size	Care notes	Commercial sources	Image
Cambarellus	Cambarellus diminutus	Least dwarf crayfish				
Cambarellus	Cambarellus montezumae	Acocil crayfish				Image Needed
Cambarellus	Cambarellus shufeldtii	Cajun dwarf crayfish				
Cambarellus	Cambarellus patzcuarensis	Mexican dwarf crayfish				
Cherax	Cherax boesemani	Supernova crayfish				
Cherax	Cherax destructor	Common yabby				
Cherax	Cherax peknyi	Zebra crayfish				
Cherax	Cherax quadricarinatus	Australian red claw crayfish				
Cherax	Cherax snowden	Emerald fire crayfish				
Faxonius	Faxonius immunis	Paper shell crayfish				
Faxonius	Faxonius limosus	Spiny cheek crayfish				
Pacifastacus	Pacifastacus leniusculus	Signal crayfish				
Procambarus	Procambarus alleni	Blue crayfish				
Procambarus	Procambarus braswelli	Waccamaw crayfish				Image Needed
Procambarus	Procambarus clarkii	Red swamp crayfish				
Procambarus	Procambarus milleri	Miami cave crayfish				
Procambarus	Procambarus virginalis	Marbled crayfish				

=== Crabs ===
Genus	Species	Common name	Size	Care notes	Commercial sources	Image
Limnopilos	Limnopilos naiyanetri	Thai micro crab				
Parathelphusa	Parathelphusa pantherina	Panther crab				
Ptychognathus	Ptychognathus barbatus	Freshwater pompom crab				Image Needed
Syntripsa	Syntripsa flavichela					Image Needed
Syntripsa	Syntripsa matanensis	Matano crab				Image Needed
Parathelphusa	Parathelphusa ferruginea					Image Needed
Siamthelphusa	Siamthelphusa retimanus	Thai micro rock crab				Image Needed
Potamocypoda	Potamocypoda pugil	Ghost dwarf crab				Image Needed

=== Hermit crabs and allies (Anomurans) ===
Genus	Species	Common name	Size	Care notes	Commercial sources	Image
Aegla	Aegla platensis	Common pancora				
Clibanarius	Clibanarius fonticola	Freshwater hermit crab				Image Needed

=== Isopods ===
Genus	Species	Common name	Size	Care notes	Commercial sources	Image
Asellus	Asellus aquaticus					

=== Amphipods ===
Genus	Species	Common name	Size	Care notes	Commercial sources	Image
Gammarus	Gammarus pulex	Freshwater scud				
Hyalella	Hyalella azteca	Mexican freshwater scud				

=== Copepods ===
Genus	Species	Common name	Size	Care notes	Commercial sources	Image

== Branchiopods ==
=== Fairy shrimp (Anostracans) ===
Genus	Species	Common name	Size	Care notes	Commercial sources	Image
Branchinecta	Branchinecta gigas	Giant fairy shrimp				Image Needed
Branchinecta	Branchinella thailandensis	Thai fairy shrimp				Image Needed
Branchinecta	Branchinecta mackini	alkali fairy shrimp				
Streptocephalus	Streptocephalus sealii	Redtail fairy shrimp				Image Needed
Thamnocephalus	Thamnocephalus platyurus	Beavertail fairy shrimp				Image Needed

=== Clam shrimp and waterfleas (Diplostracans) ===
Genus	Species	Common name	Size	Care notes	Commercial sources	Image
Daphnia	Daphnia magna	Giant waterflea				
Daphnia	Daphnia pulex	Common waterflea				
Moina	Moina sp.	Moina, Japanese waterflea				

=== Tadpole shrimp (Notostracans) ===
Genus	Species	Common name	Size	Care notes	Commercial sources	Image
Lepidurus	Lepidurus apus					
Triops	Triops australiensis					
Triops	Triops cancriformis					
Triops	Triops granarius					
Triops	Triops longicaudatus					
Triops	Triops newberryi					

== Molluscs ==
=== Snails (Gastropods) ===
Genus	Species	Common name	Size	Care notes	Commercial sources	Image

- Asolene spixii (zebra apple snail)
- Marisa cornuarietis (Colombian ramshorn apple snail)
- Planorbidae species (ramshorn snails)
- Pomacea diffusa (spike-topped apple snail)
- Pomacea canaliculata (channeled apple snail)
- Physidae species (bladder or tadpole snails)
- Lymnaeidae (pond and melantho snails)
- Lymnaea stagnalis (great pond snail)
- Planorbarius corneus (Great Ramshorn)
- Melanoides tuberculata (red-rimmed melania or Malaysian trumpet snail)
- Tarebia granifera (quilted melania or spike-tail trumpet snail)
- Cipangopaludina malleata (Japanese trapdoor snail)
- Clithon corona (horned nerite snail)
- Neritina natalensis (zebra nerite snail)
- Vittina semiconica (red onion or tire tracked nerite snail)
- Neritina reclivata (olive nerite snail)
- Neripteron violaceum "Red Lips" (Red Lip Nerite Snail)
- Septaria porcellana (freshwater limpet)
- Neritina sp. (mosaic nerite snail)
- Neritina sp. (tribal nerite snail)
- Brotia pagodula (horned armour snail)
- Pachymelania byronensis (west African freshwater snail)
- Neritina pulligera (dusky nerite)
- Paludomus sulcatus (bella snail)
- Thiara cancellata (hairy tower lid snail)
- Taia naticoides (piano snail)
- Brotia herculea (giant tower cap snail)
- Planorbella duryi (miniature red ramshorn snail)
- Tylomelania species (Tylo or Sulawesi snails)
  - Tylomelania sp. Poso "Yellow"
  - Tylomelania sp. Poso "Orange Flash"
- Tylomelania patriarchalis (black Sulawesi snails)
- Cipangopaludina lecythoides (tiger tuba snail)
- Faunus ater (black devil snail)
- Anentome helena (assassin snail)

=== Bivalves ===
Genus	Species	Common name	Size	Care notes	Commercial sources	Image
Corbicula	Corbicula fluminea	Asian clam				

== Sponges ==
Genus	Species	Common name	Size	Care notes	Commercial sources	Image

== Jellyfish ==
Genus	Species	Common name	Size	Care notes	Commercial sources	Image
Craspedacusta	Craspedacusta sowerbii	Peach blossom jellyfish, freshwater jellyfish	2-2.5 cm			

== Annelid worms ==
Genus	Species	Common name	Size	Care notes	Commercial sources	Image
Barbronia	Barbronia weberi	Asian freshwater leech				
Helobdella	Helobdella europaea	European flat leech				
Lumbriculus	Lumbriculus variegatus	California blackworm				
Tubifex	Tubifex tubifex	Tubifex worm				

== Rotifers ==
Genus	Species	Common name	Size	Care notes	Commercial sources	Image

== Tardigrades ==
Genus	Species	Common name	Size	Care notes	Commercial sources	Image

== Ribbon worms (Nemerteans) ==
Genus	Species	Common name	Size	Care notes	Commercial sources	Image

== Moss animals (Bryozoans) ==
Genus	Species	Common name	Size	Care notes	Commercial sources	Image

== See also ==
- List of fish common names
- List of freshwater aquarium plant species
- List of freshwater aquarium amphibian species
- List of freshwater aquarium fish species
- List of brackish aquarium fish species
- List of marine aquarium fish species
- List of marine aquarium invertebrate species
