= Triops mauritanicus =

Scientific classification
- Domain: Eukaryota
- Kingdom: Animalia
- Phylum: Arthropoda
- Class: Branchiopoda
- Order: Notostraca
- Family: Triopsidae
- Genus: Triops
- Species: T. mauritanicus

Binomial name
- Triops mauritanicus Ghigi, 1921

Species of tadpole shrimp

Triops mauritanicus is a species of tadpole shrimp, found in Southern Spain and Morocco. This species of Triops can grow to 4 to 6 cm (1.6 to 2.4 in) and can be expected to live for 90-120 days on average. This species can be usually found in arid areas and are sometimes sold in kits (although Triops longicaudatus is the most commonly sold triops).

== Subspecies ==
This species is divided into two subspecies:

- Triops mauritanicus mauritanicus
- Triops mauritanicus simplex
