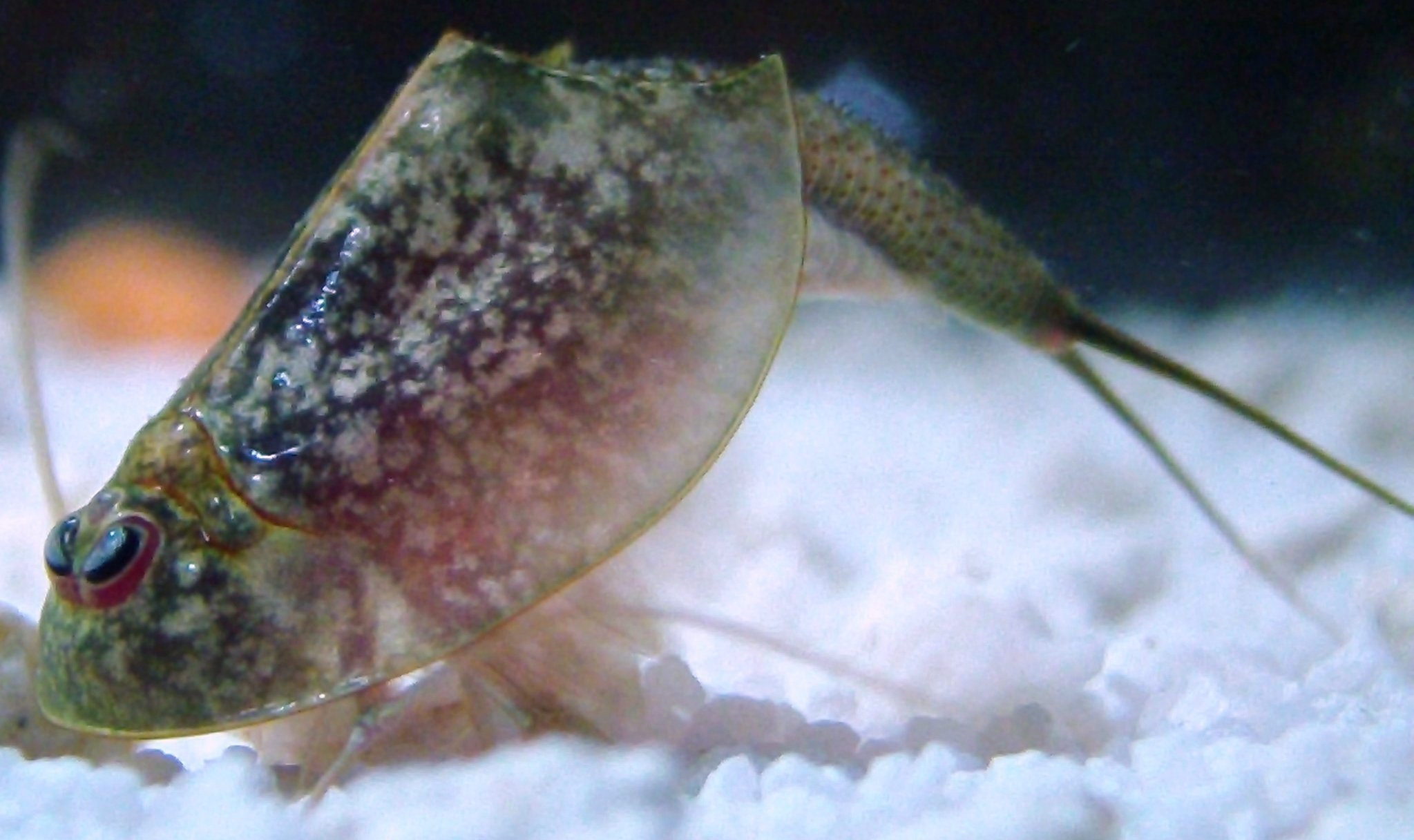
- Triops newberryi digging a nest and egg laying

Scientific classification
- Domain: Eukaryota
- Kingdom: Animalia
- Phylum: Arthropoda
- Class: Branchiopoda
- Order: Notostraca
- Family: Triopsidae
- Genus: Triops
- Species: T. newberryi

Binomial name
- Triops newberryi Thomas, 1921
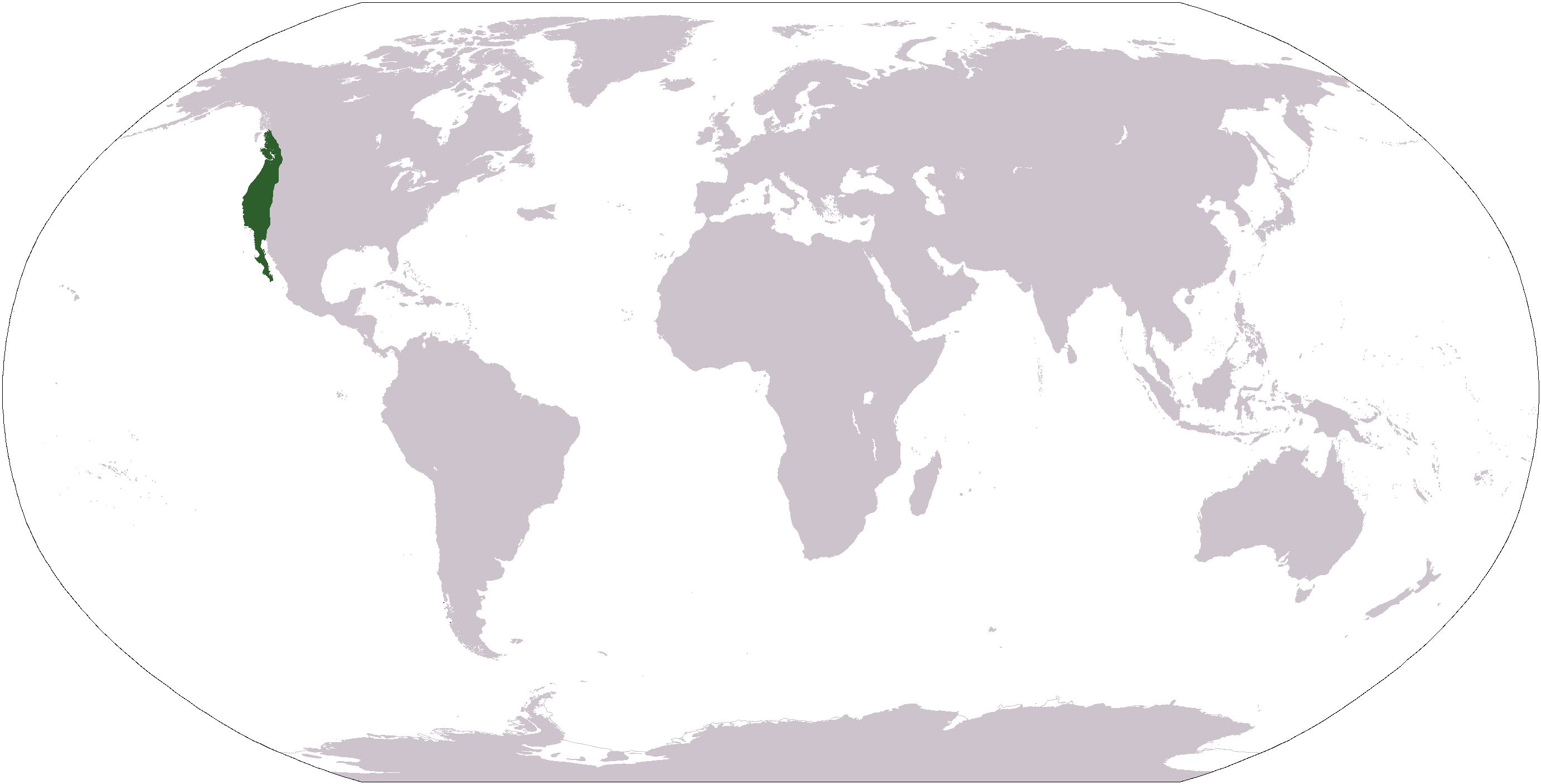
- The range of Triops newberryi

= Triops newberryi =

Species of small freshwater animal

Triops newberryi is a species of Triops found on the western coast of North America, commonly in valleys throughout the states of Washington, Oregon, California, and small areas of Nevada, Utah, New Mexico, and Mexico, with at least one disjunct population in Kansas. They are found in vast numbers though in the Coachella Valley in California. T. newberryi has been reported to have potential as a biocontrol agent for larval mosquitoes breeding in seasonally-flooded habitats. T. newberryi is genetically distinct from T. longicaudatus, the dominant species in the Central United States.

== In captivity ==
Though Triops newberryi is the species most likely to be encountered in the wild on the west coast of North America, it is far less common than Triops cancriformis and Triops longicaudatus in captivity, and is considered a more 'exotic' species among hobbyists.
