= Triops vicentinus =

Conservation status
- Endangered (IUCN 3.1)

Scientific classification
- Kingdom: Animalia
- Phylum: Arthropoda
- Class: Branchiopoda
- Order: Notostraca
- Family: Triopsidae
- Genus: Triops
- Species: T. vicentinus

Binomial name
- Triops vicentinus Korn, Machado, Cristo & Cancela da Fonseca, 2010

Species of small freshwater animal

Triops vincentinus is a species of freshwater crustacean tadpole shrimps.

It is endemic to Portugal, and only found within the Faro District.
