= Triops baeticus =

Conservation status
- Endangered (IUCN 3.1)

Scientific classification
- Kingdom: Animalia
- Phylum: Arthropoda
- Clade: Pancrustacea
- Class: Branchiopoda
- Order: Notostraca
- Family: Triopsidae
- Genus: Triops
- Species: T. baeticus

Binomial name
- Triops baeticus Korn, 2010

Species of crustacean

Triops baeticus is a species of crustacean of the genus Triops described by Korn in 2010. It is found in freshwater in parts of both Spain and Portugal. It is considered to be an endangered species by the IUCN, mostly due to habitat fragmentation and pollution.
