= Nerita cardinalis =

Nerita cardinalis may refer to two species of snails in the family Neritidae:

- Nerita cardinalis Röding, 1798, a synonym of Neritina virginea (Linnaeus, 1758)
- Nerita cardinalis Le Guillou, 1841, a synonym of Clithon corona (Linnaeus, 1758)
