= I. spinosa =

I. spinosa may refer to:

- Iliella spinosa, an extinct branchiopod crustacean species
- Indigofera spinosa, a flowering plant species in the genus Indigofera

== See also ==
- Spinosa (disambiguation)
