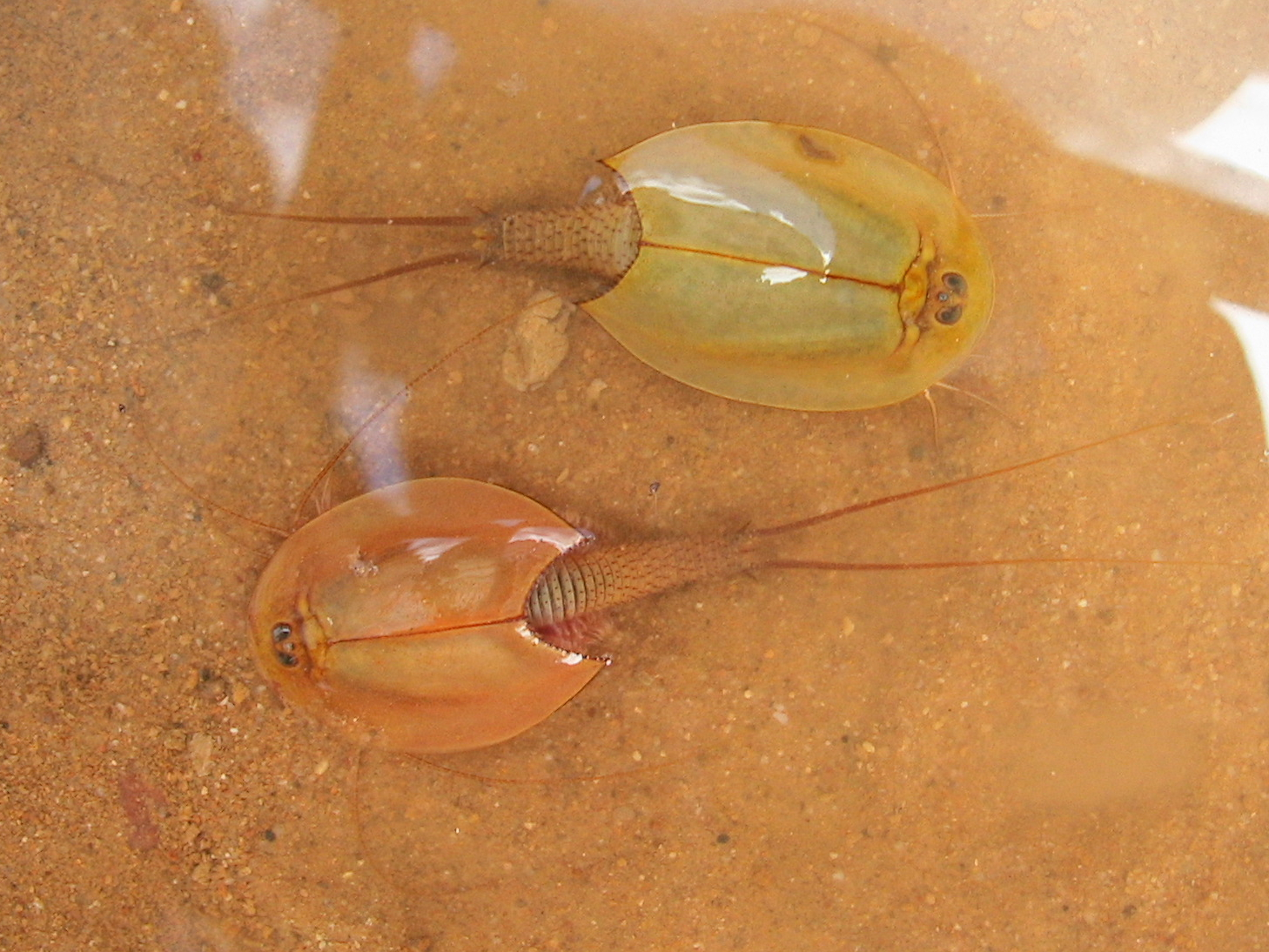

Conservation status
- Critically Endangered (IUCN 3.1)

Scientific classification
- Kingdom: Animalia
- Phylum: Arthropoda
- Class: Branchiopoda
- Order: Notostraca
- Family: Triopsidae
- Genus: Triops
- Species: T. emeritensis

Binomial name
- Triops emeritensis Korn & Pérez-Bote, 2010

= Triops emeritensis =

Species of crustacean

Triops emeritensis is a species of branchiopod within the family Triopsidae. The species is endemic to the Iberian Peninsula in Extremadura, only being recorded from two ponds near La Albuera, Badajoz. The species has been assessed as 'Critically endangered' by the IUCN Red List, as despite its temporary ponds being in a protected area it still faces potential threats such as nearby agriculture and water extraction, along with habitat fragmentation from human infrastructure and natural barriers.
