= Triops gadensis =

Conservation status
- Endangered (IUCN 3.1)

Scientific classification
- Kingdom: Animalia
- Phylum: Arthropoda
- Class: Branchiopoda
- Order: Notostraca
- Family: Triopsidae
- Genus: Triops
- Species: T. gadensis

Binomial name
- Triops gadensis Korn & García-de-Lomas, in Korn et al., 2010

Species of arthropod

Triops gadensis is a European species of arthropod in the genus Triops, that belongs to the family of Triopsidae. Triops gadensis are omnivores and in the wild they mainly eat algae and protozoa; larger Triops gadensis that are about 1–2 cm (0.39–0.79 in) in length feed on detritus (worms if they can find any), plant fibres and tiny crustaceans such as ostracods or copepods. However when food sources are scarce they will cannibalize each other. These crustaceans swim by drag swim power, which is a method of swimming that all Triops use.

== Conservation status ==
Triops gadensis is listed as "Endangered" by the IUCN. It is restricted to just 9 locations in southern Spain. The species is affected by pesticide contamination and habitat fragmentation.
