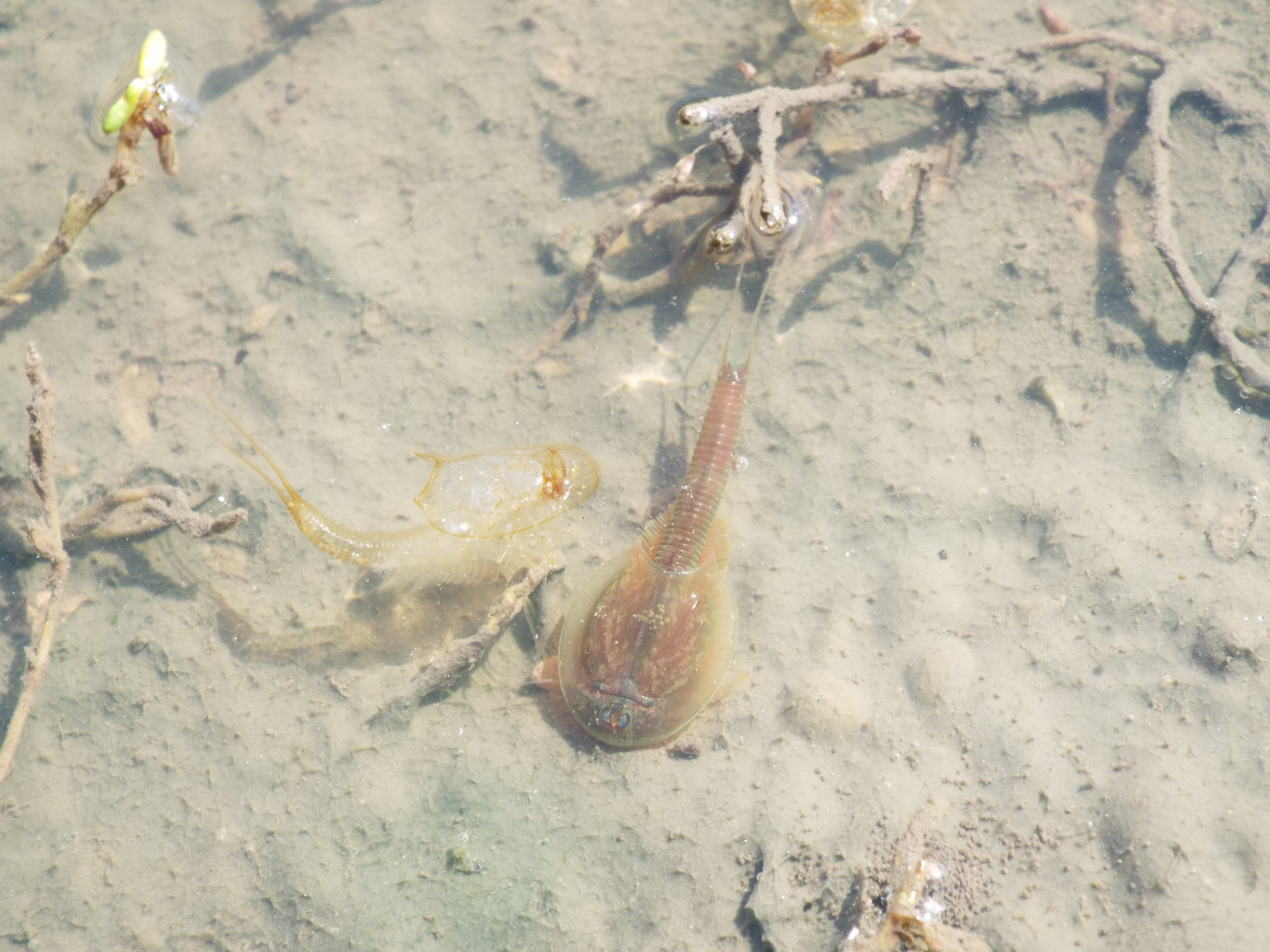

Scientific classification
- Domain: Eukaryota
- Kingdom: Animalia
- Phylum: Arthropoda
- Class: Branchiopoda
- Order: Notostraca
- Family: Triopsidae
- Genus: Triops
- Species: T. granarius

Binomial name
- Triops granarius (Lucas, 1864)
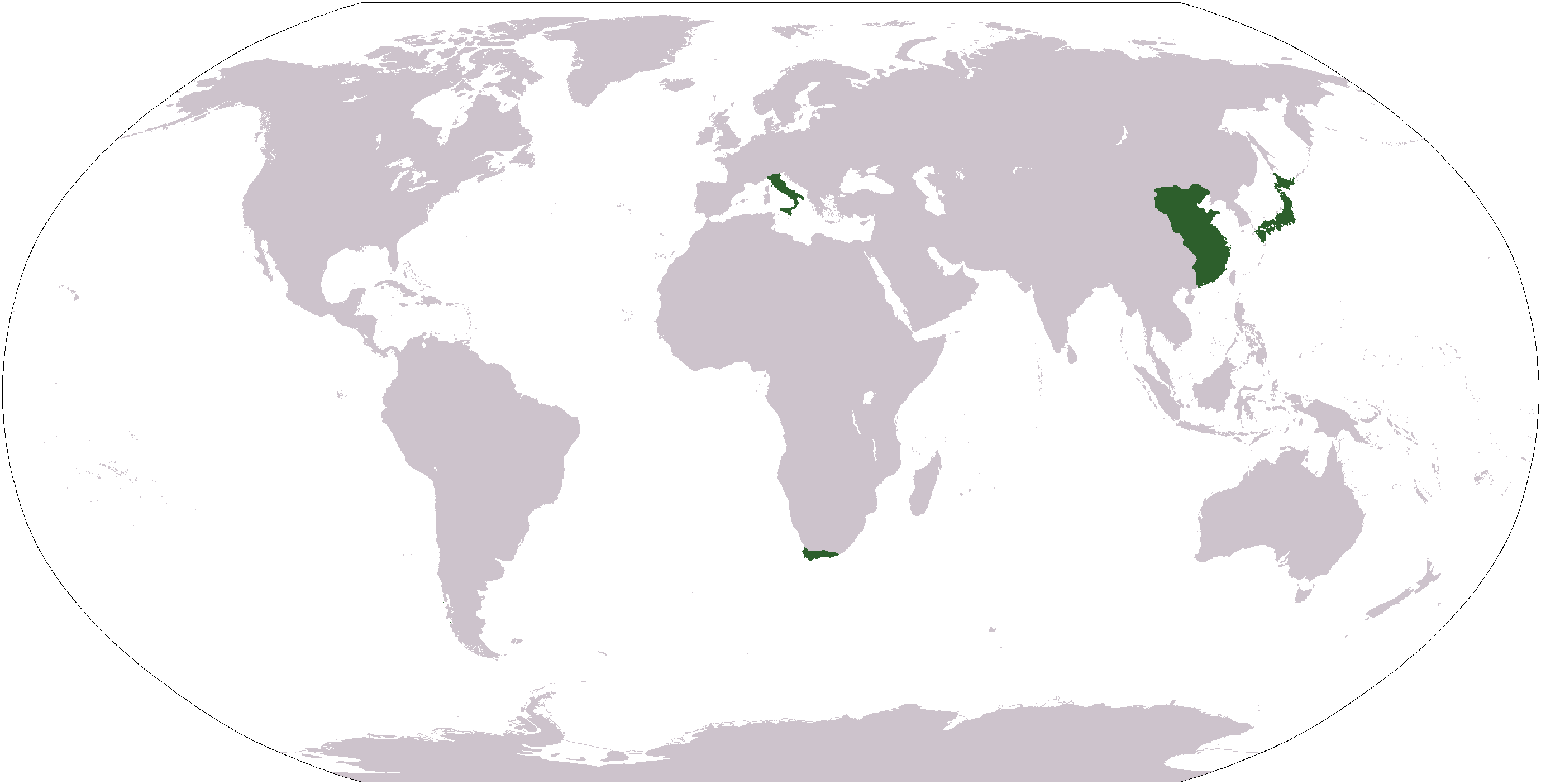
- Map showing the extreme points in the range of Triops granarius (also found in many areas in between)

Synonyms
- Apus granarius Lucas, 1864; Triops numidicus (Grube, 1865)

= Triops granarius =

Species of small freshwater animal

Triops granarius is a species of tadpole shrimp with a broad distribution from Africa and the Middle East to China and Japan, although there are indications that it, as presently defined, is a species complex. They have elongated bodies and large flaps. Triops granarius can be kept as pets in home aquaria. Their life expectancy is up to 90 days, and in that time they can grow more than 6 cm in length.

Triops granarius range in colour from dark brown to a light brown with a greenish tinge. They can live in water with a pH from 6 to 10, but the optimal pH is from 7 to 8. Unlike most Triops species, males make up 40% of the population of this species. Males can be distinguished by their dark shade. Triops granarius lives in shallow pools or ponds and can survive for days without food, they can eat most organic matter such as detritus and plant debris. Triops granarius is exposed to desiccation and extreme temperatures after the water dries up in its habitat. To withstand this severe environment, Triops eggs enter anhydrobiosis after the water evaporates. The eggs can hatch 20 years later; this has enabled Triops to survive extirpation.
