= Atyaephyra desmarestii =

Scientific classification
- Kingdom: Animalia
- Phylum: Arthropoda
- Clade: Pancrustacea
- Class: Malacostraca
- Order: Decapoda
- Suborder: Pleocyemata
- Infraorder: Caridea
- Family: Atyidae
- Genus: Atyaephyra
- Species: A. desmarestii

Binomial name
- Atyaephyra desmarestii (Millet, 1831)

Synonyms
- Atyaephyra desmaresti (Millet, 1831), misspelling; Atyaephyra desmaresti var. occidentalis Bouvier, 1913; Atyaephyra rosiana de Brito Capello, 1866; Hippolyte desmarestii Millet, 1831; Symethus fluviatilis Rafinesque, 1814, unavailable name

Species of crustacean

Atyaephyra desmarestii is a species of freshwater shrimp in Europe.

== Description ==
Atyaephyra desmerestii is a small crustacean, measuring on average about 3 centimeters in size, and a maximum size of 4 centimeters.

== Range ==
Atyaephyra desmerestii is found in most of central and southern Europe, although it is not found in the UK and Denmark. There are also scattered populations in northern Africa.

== Taxonomy ==
The species was first described by P. A. Millet in 1831 as Hippolyte desmarestii. In 1867, de Brito Capello established a new genus Atyaephyra which included H. desmarestii as Atyaephyra desmarestii.
