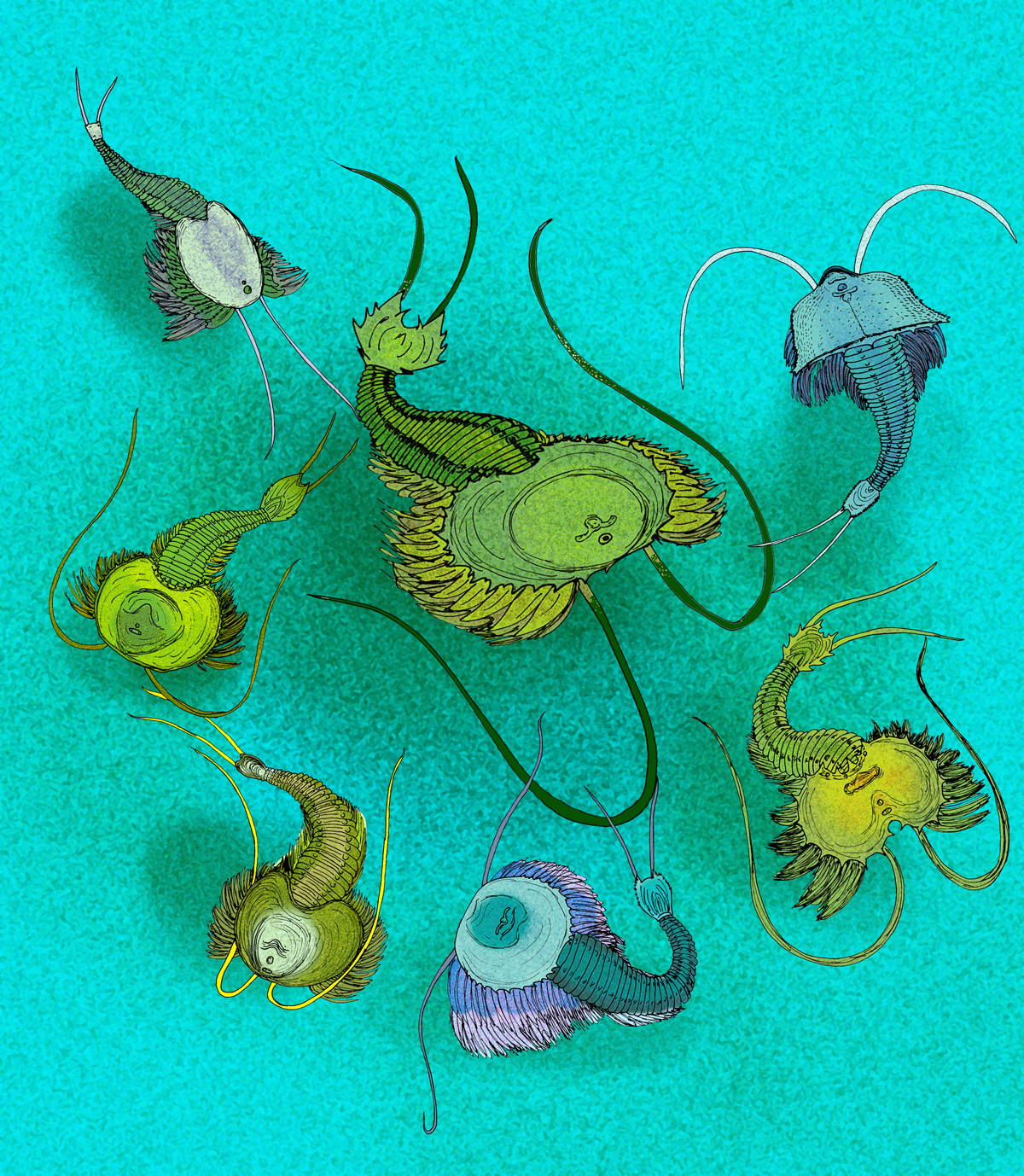

Scientific classification
- Kingdom: Animalia
- Phylum: Arthropoda
- Clade: Pancrustacea
- Class: Branchiopoda
- Order: †Kazacharthra; Novojilov, 1957
- Family: †Ketmeniidae; Novozhilov 1957

Species
- Ketmenia Chernyshev 1940; Almatium Novozhilov 1957; Iliella Chernyshev 1940; Jeanrogerium Novojilov 1960; Kungeja Novozhilov 1957; Kysyltamia Novozhilov 1957; Panacanthocaris Novozhilov 1957

= Kazacharthra =

Kazacharthra Temporal range: Upper Triassic–Lower Jurassic

Order of small freshwater animals

Kazacharthra is an extinct order of branchiopod crustaceans that appear to be closely related to the living order Notostraca (the tadpole shrimp). Kazacharthrans lived in marshes and ponds in the Upper Triassic of Western China and Mongolia, and in Lower Jurassic Kazakhstan (where their fossils were first found, hence the name). It is presumed that the kazacharthrids lived much like their living relatives, in that they were opportunistic omnivores that fed on any available food source, from bacterial biofilms to detritus to smaller animals that could be overpowered (i.e., fairy shrimp, small or recently hatched amphibian larvae, smaller members of the same species, etc.).

The kazacharthrans are distinguished from tadpole shrimp by their much larger size (carapace length ranging from 0.6 to 5 centimeters), uniquely shaped, heavily sclerotized and mineralized carapaces, and plate-shaped telsons. The carapace, or headshield, has a distinctive pattern of tubercles, typically including a centrally anteriorly located tubercle that may or may not have housed the compound eyes, as well as other distinctively shaped tubercles that may represent attachment sites for the mandibles.

== Taxonomy ==
There are seven genera recognized, placed within a single family and order.

- Order Kazacharthra Novojilov 1957
  - Family Ketmeniidae Novozhilov 1957 [Paratriopsidae Chernyshev 1940]
    - Genus Ketmenia Chernyshev 1940
      - Ketmenia schultzi Chernyshev 1940
    - Genus Almatium Novozhilov 1957
      - Almatium gusevi Novozhilov 1957
    - Genus Iliella Chernyshev 1940
      - Iliella spinosa Chernyshev 1940
    - Genus Jeanrogerium Novojilov 1960
      - Jeanrogerium sornayi Novojilov 1960
    - Genus Kungeja Novozhilov 1957
      - Kungeja tchakabaevi Novozhilov 1957
    - Genus Kysyltamia Novozhilov 1957
      - Kysyltamia tchiiliensis Novozhilov 1957
    - Genus Panacanthocaris Novozhilov 1957
      - Panacanthocaris ketmenia Novozhilov 1957
