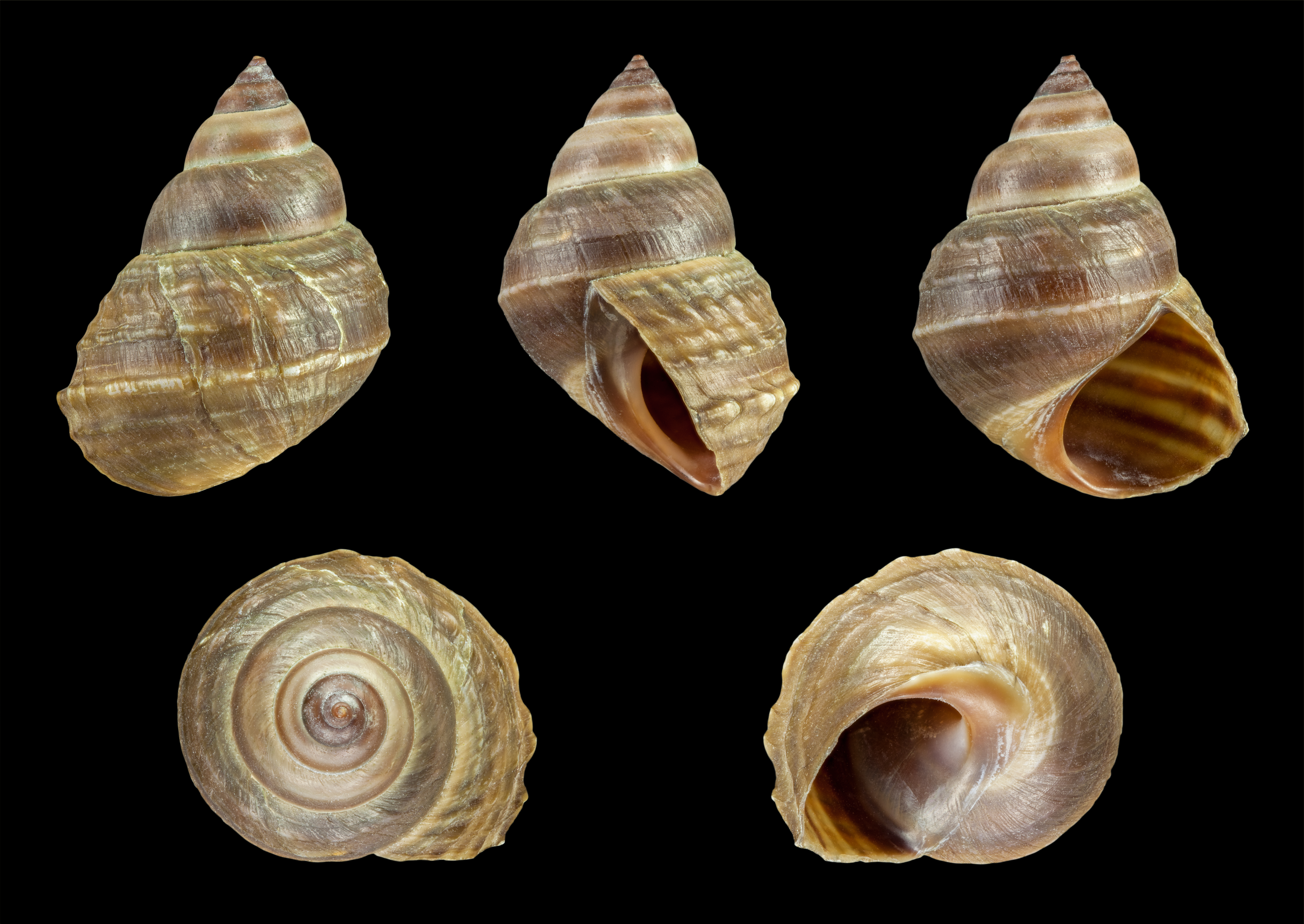
- Taia naticoides shell

Scientific classification
- Kingdom: Animalia
- Phylum: Mollusca
- Class: Gastropoda
- Subclass: Caenogastropoda
- Order: Architaenioglossa
- Family: Viviparidae
- Genus: Taia
- Species: T. naticoides

Binomial name
- Taia naticoides (Theobald, 1865)

= Taia naticoides =

Species of gastropod

Taia naticoides is a species of a freshwater snail with an operculum and a gill. It is an aquatic gastropod mollusc in the family Viviparidae - commonly known as river snails.

== Human use ==
It is used as a freshwater aquarium pet.
