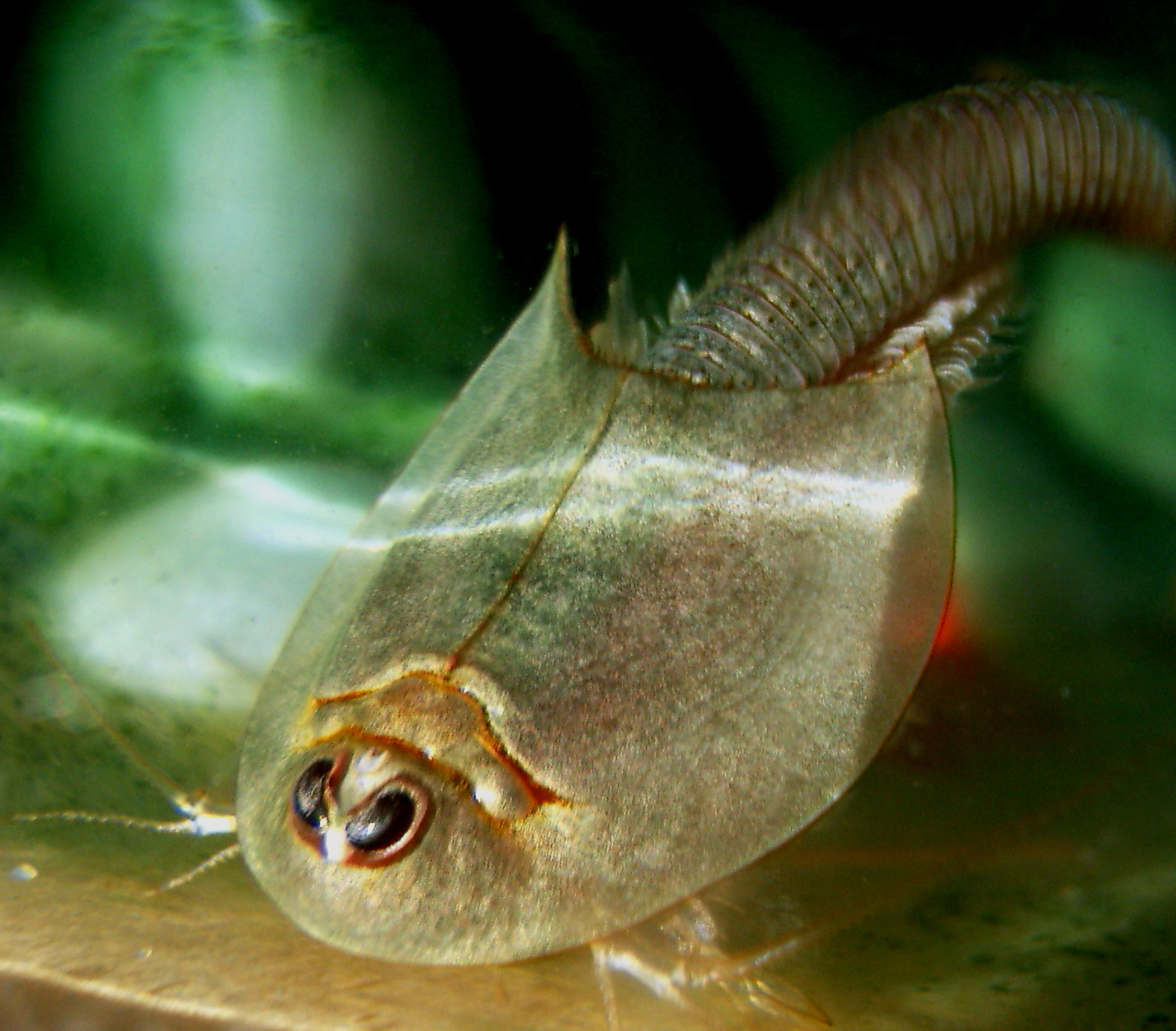
- Triops longicaudatus

Scientific classification
- Kingdom: Animalia
- Phylum: Arthropoda
- Clade: Pancrustacea
- Class: Branchiopoda
- Order: Notostraca
- Family: Triopsidae
- Genus: Triops; Schrank, 1803

Type species
- Apus cancriformis Bosc, 1801

Species
- Triops australiensis; Triops baeticus; Triops cancriformis; Triops emeritensis; Triops gadensis; Triops granarius; Triops longicaudatus; Triops mauritanicus; Triops newberryi; Triops vicentinus

= Triops =

Triops Temporal range: Early Miocene–Present

Genus of small crustaceans

Triops, from Ancient Greek τρία (tría), meaning "three", and ὄψ (óps), meaning "face" or "eye", is a genus of small crustaceans in the order Notostraca (tadpole shrimp). The long-lasting resting eggs of several species of Triops are commonly sold in kits as pets. The animals hatch upon contact with fresh water. Most adult-stage Triops have a life expectancy of up to 90 days and can tolerate a pH range of 6 to 10. In nature, they often inhabit temporary pools.

== Relatives and fossil record ==
The genus Triops can be distinguished from the only other living genus of Notostraca, Lepidurus, by the form of the telson (the end of its 'tail'), which bears only a pair of long, thin caudal extensions in Triops, while Lepidurus also bears a central platelike process. Only 24 hours after hatching they already resemble miniature versions of the adult form.

Triops are sometimes called "living fossils", since fossils that have been attributed to this genus have been found in rocks hundreds of millions of years old. Molecular clock estimates suggest that Triops split from Lepidurus during the Triassic or Jurassic, between 152.3–233.5 million years ago. The earliest diverging lineages of living Triops are found in areas that are part of the former supercontinent Gondwana, suggesting Triops originated in Gondwana. However, the earliest known definitive fossil attributed to Triops is known from the Early Miocene of Japan, and careful analysis of the pre-Cenozoic fossils suggest that they do not belong to Triops, with some not even belonging to notostracans.

The Upper Carboniferous genus Lynceites was once thought to represent Triops, but subsequent analysis consider it as a separate genus. Fossils from the Lower Triassic of France and Upper Triassic of Germany have been previously attributed to Triops cancriformis, with some even described as specimens of the subspecies T. c. minor, but later research reassigned all of these Triassic specimens to different extinct taxa of uncertain taxonomic family: the notostracan Apudites antiquus and the diplostracans Olesenocaris galli and Grauvogelocaris alsatica. The putative Lower Permian subspecies of Triops cancriformis from France has also been redescribed as a separate notostracan taxon, Heidiops permiensis. Two putative fossil species of Triops, T. hanshanensis and T. bashuensis, known from the Middle Jurassic of China likely belong to separate genera with features unknown in any extant or extinct species of notostracans.

Triops can be found in Africa, Australia, Asia, South America, Europe (including Great Britain), and in some parts of North America where the climate is right. Some eggs stay unhatched from the previous group and hatch when rain soaks the area. Triops are often found in vernal pools.

== Life cycle ==
Most species reproduce sexually, but some populations are dominated by hermaphrodites which produce internally fertilised eggs. Reproduction in T. cancriformis varies with latitude, with sexual reproduction dominating in the south of its range, and parthenogenesis dominating in the north.

Triops eggs enter a state of extended diapause when dry, and will tolerate temperatures of up to 98 °C (208 °F) for 16 hours, whereas the adult cannot survive temperatures above 34 °C (93 °F) for 24 hours or 40 °C (104 °F) for 2 hours. The diapause also prevents the eggs from hatching too soon after rain; the pool must fill with enough water for the dormancy to be broken.

== Taxonomy ==
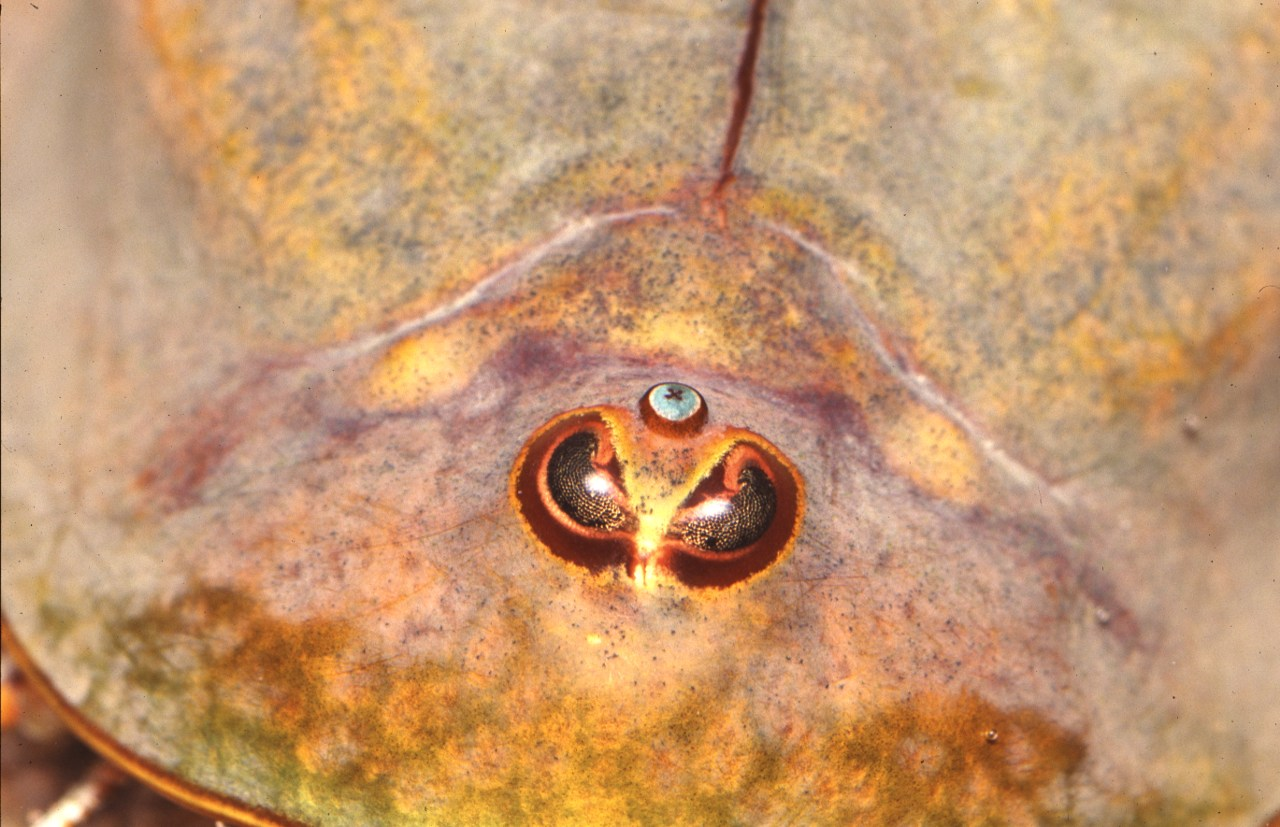
Closeup of adult Triops showing naupliar ocellus

The name Triops comes from Ancient Greek τρία (tría), meaning "three", and ὄψ (óps), meaning "face" or "eye". The head of T. longicaudatus bears a pair of dorsal compound eyes that lie close to each other and are nearly fused together. The compound eyes are generally sessile (not stalked). In addition, there is a naupliar ocellus (the "third eye") between them. The compound eyes are on the surface of the head, but the ocellus is deep within the head. All the eyes, however, are easily visible through the shell covering of the head.

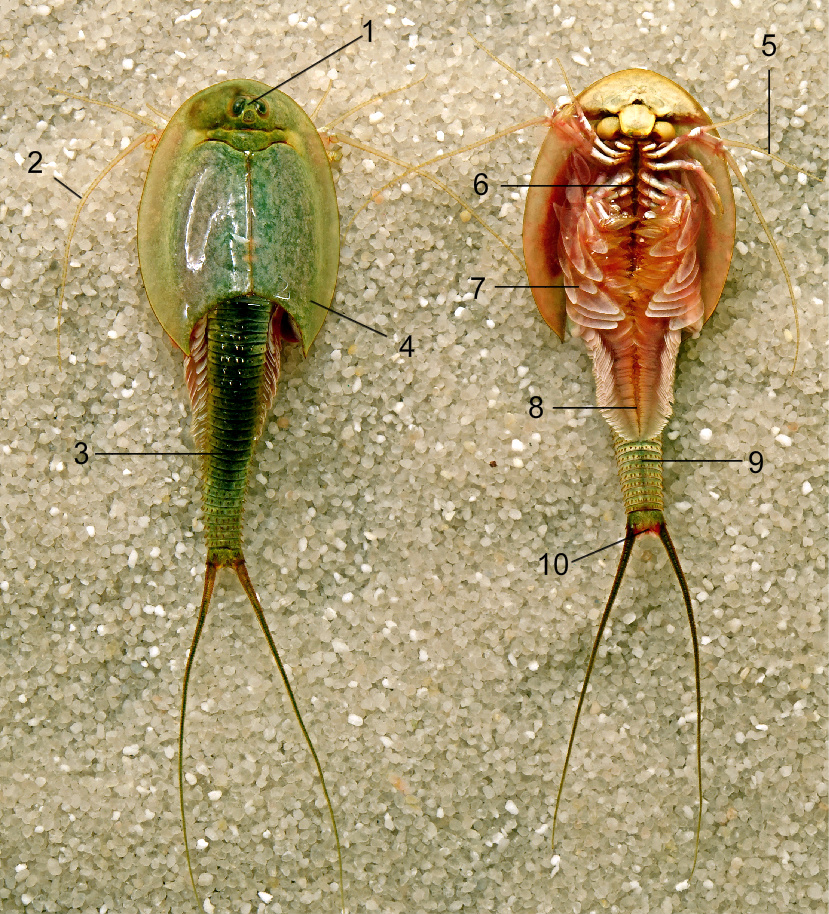
Upper and underside Triops. 1 eyes, 2 antennae, 3 tail, 4 torso, 5 antenne, 6 1st torso appendix, 7 legs with gill, 8 middelline, 9 tail, 10 anus

Franz von Paula Schrank was the first author to use the genus name Triops, coining it in his 1803 work on the fauna of Bavaria. Their German name was Dreyauge, which means 'three-eye'. He collected and described specimens from the same locality in Regensburg from which Schäffer, another naturalist who had studied the Notostraca, obtained his specimens in the 1750s. However, other authors, starting with Louis Augustin Guillaume Bosc, had adopted the genus name Apus for the organisms Schrank had named Triops.

Ludwig Keilhack used the genus name Triops in his 1909 field identification key of the freshwater fauna of Germany. He suggested that the genus name Apus be replaced by Triops Schrank since an avian genus had already been described by Giovanni Antonio Scopoli under the name Apus. However, Robert Gurney preferred the name Apus Schäffer. He suggested that the name '…Triops Schrank, may be returned to the obscurity from which it was unearthed'. This controversy continued and was not resolved until the 1950s.

In his 1955 taxonomic review of the Notostraca, Alan R. Longhurst supported Keilhack's genus name Triops over Apus. Longhurst provided historical evidence to support this position. The International Commission on Zoological Nomenclature (ICZN) followed Longhurst in their 1958 ruling on the usage and origin of the genus names Triops and Apus. They rejected the genus name Apus and instead recognized the genus name Triops Schrank, 1803 (ICZN name no. 1246).

Although the taxonomy of the genus has not been reviewed since 1955, the following species are recognised:

- Triops australiensis (Spencer & Hall, 1895)
- Triops baeticus Korn, 2010
- Triops cancriformis (Bosc, 1801)
- Triops emeritensis Korn & Pérez-Bote, 2010
- Triops gadensis Korn & García-de-Lomas, 2010
- Triops granarius (Lucas, 1864)
- Triops longicaudatus (LeConte, 1846)
- Triops mauritanicus Ghigi, 1921
- Triops newberryi Thomas, 1921
- Triops vicentinus Korn, Machado, Cristo & Cancela da Fonseca, 2010

T. mauritanicus was considered a subspecies of T. cancriformis by Longhurst in 1955, but was given full species status again by Korn et al. in 2006.

Note that for several of these species there are different varieties, some of which have recently been suggested as subspecies and even separate species. T. longicaudatus, for example, may actually be several species lumped together, and T. cancriformis is generally recognized as having three subspecies: T. cancriformis cancriformis, T. c. mauretanicus, and T. c. simplex. Also, the albino form has the special name of T. cancriformis var. Beni-Kabuto Ebi.

== Relationship with humans ==
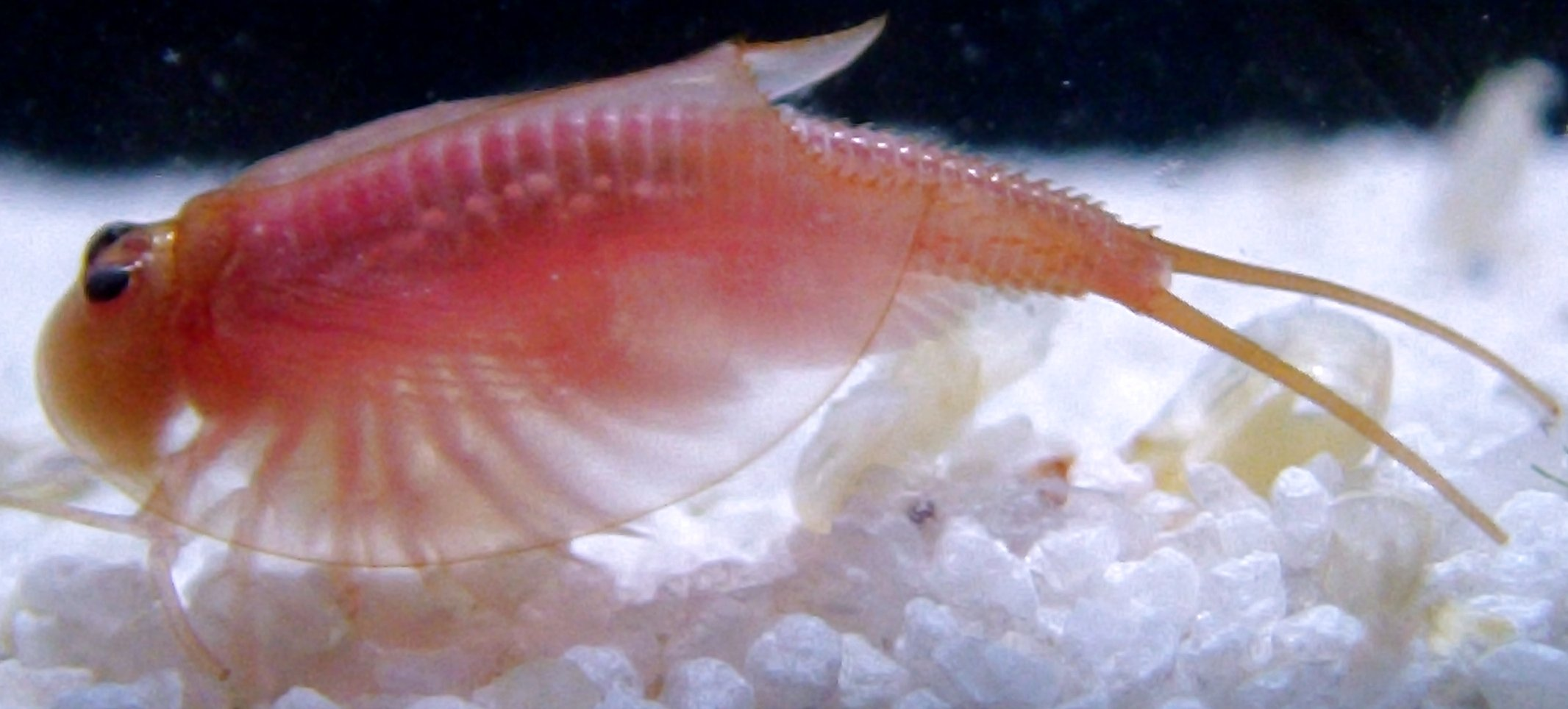
Triops cancriformis "Beni-Kabuto Ebi Albino" showing translucent carapace. As the animal grows the carapace will become more opaque but will never take on the color pattern normally associated with T. cancriformis.

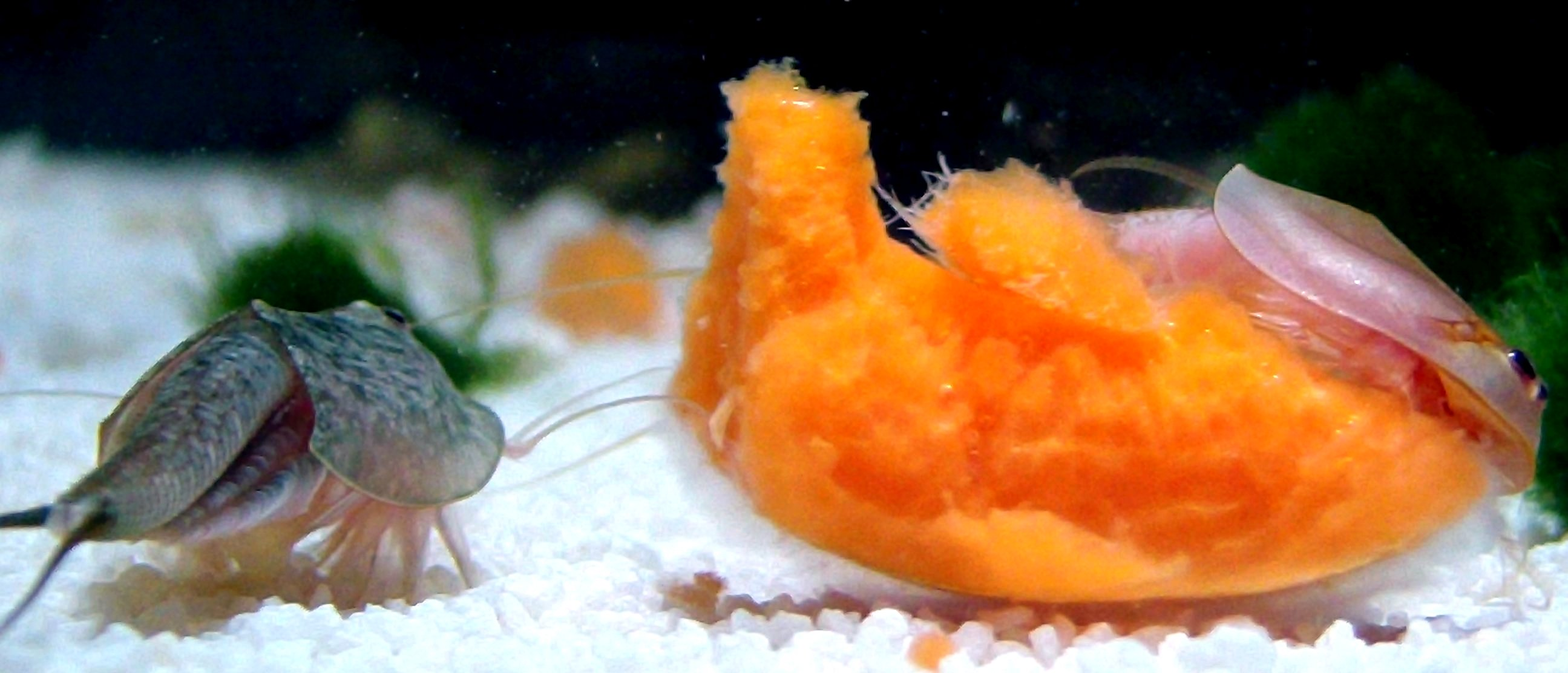
Captive Triops cancriformis (left) and Triops longicaudatus (right) feeding on carrot.

T. longicaudatus is considered a human ally against the West Nile virus, as the individuals consume Culex mosquito larvae. They also are used as a biological pest control in Japan, eating weeds in rice paddies. The Beni-Kabuto Ebi Albino variant of T. cancriformis is particularly valued for this purpose. In Wyoming, the presence of T. longicaudatus usually indicates a good chance of the hatching of American spadefoot toads.

Dried eggs of T. longicaudatus are sold in kits to be raised as aquarium pets, sold under the name of "aquasaurs", "trigons" or "triops". Among enthusiasts, T. cancriformis is also common. Other species often encountered in captivity include T. australiensis, T. newberryi and T. granarius.

Captive Triops are frequently kept in aquaria and fed a diet consisting mainly of carrots, shrimp pellets and dried shrimp. Often they are also given living shrimp and Daphnia as live prey. Due to their broad dietary range, they can be fed various items, including lunch meat, crackers and potatoes.

In the US state of California, T. longicaudatus has emerged as a significant pest of rice cultivation, due to its digging behaviour uprooting young rice seedlings.

== See also ==
- Notostraca
- Lepidurus
- Xiphosura
- Synziphosurina
- Trilobite
