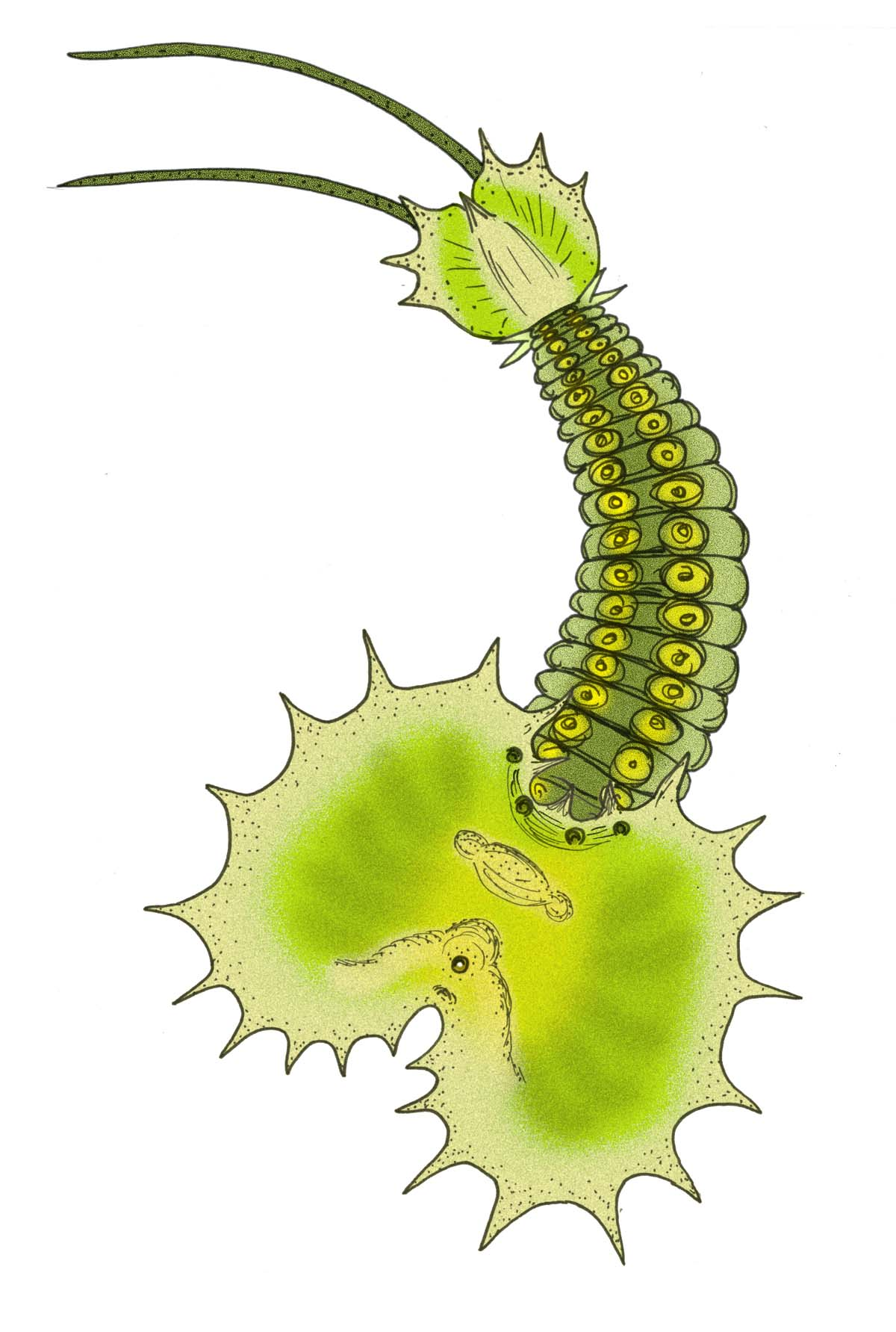
- Artist's reconstruction

Scientific classification
- Kingdom: Animalia
- Phylum: Arthropoda
- Class: Branchiopoda
- Order: †Kazacharthra
- Family: †Ketmeniidae
- Genus: †Iliella; Chernyshev, 1940
- Species: †I. spinosa

Binomial name
- †Iliella spinosa Chernyshev, 1940

= Iliella =

Iliella Temporal range: Lower Jurassic

Genus of small freshwater animals

Iliella spinosa is an extinct species of kazacharthran branchiopod crustaceans from the Lower Jurassic of Kazakhstan. It had a unique carapace that was shaped like a spiny double-oval.
