= Clibanarius fonticola =

Scientific classification
- Kingdom: Animalia
- Phylum: Arthropoda
- Clade: Pancrustacea
- Class: Malacostraca
- Order: Decapoda
- Suborder: Pleocyemata
- Infraorder: Anomura
- Family: Diogenidae
- Genus: Clibanarius
- Species: C. fonticola

Binomial name
- Clibanarius fonticola McLaughlin & Murray, 1990

Species of crustacean

Clibanarius fonticola, the freshwater hermit crab, is a species of left-handed hermit crab from Vanuatu. It lives exclusively in fresh water, the only hermit crab in the world to do so. While a number of other hermit crabs are terrestrial or live in estuarine habitats, and certain brackish water species can tolerate low salinity levels for a time, no other hermit crab spends its entire life in fresh water; the only other fully freshwater anomurans are the pancoras of the family aeglidae from South America.

Clibanarius fonticola lives on the island of Espiritu Santo, in a pool fed by springs near the village of Matevulu, close to an abandoned airstrip. Adults of this species all use shells of Clithon corona.

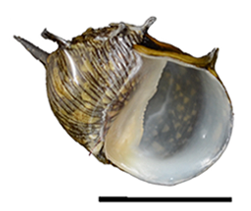
Empty shell of Clithon corona. Scale bar is 10 mm.
