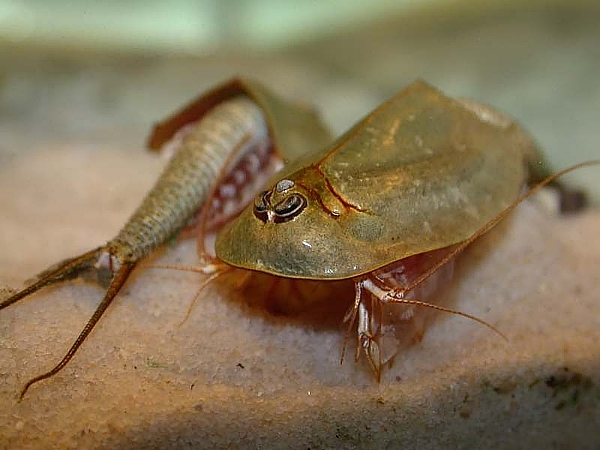
- Crustaceans Triops australiensis (shield shrimps) in aquarium

Scientific classification
- Kingdom: Animalia
- Phylum: Arthropoda
- Clade: Pancrustacea
- Class: Branchiopoda
- Order: Notostraca
- Family: Triopsidae
- Genus: Triops
- Species: T. australiensis

Binomial name
- Triops australiensis (Spencer and Hall, 1895)
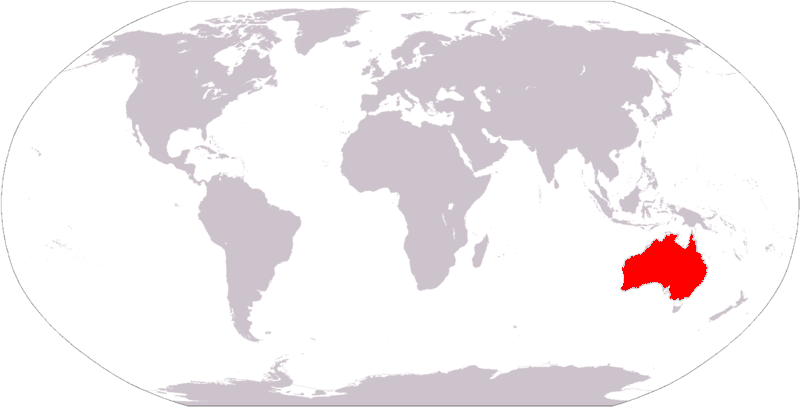
- The range of Triops australiensis

= Triops australiensis =

Species of small freshwater animal

Triops australiensis, sometimes referred to as a shield shrimp, is an Australian species of the tadpole shrimp Triops.

== Distribution ==
Triops australiensis has a wide distribution across Australia, excluding the northernmost parts of Western Australia, and Queensland. It is also absent from Tasmania in the south, where it is replaced by Lepidurus apus. The two species can be distinguished by the presence of a supra-anal plate between the caudal rami at the end of the abdomen in L. apus, which is lacking in T. australiensis.

== Biology ==
T. australiensis inhabits temporary pools of water in the arid regions of the Australian outback. When desiccated pools fill with water, the resting eggs hatch into nauplii, and rapidly develop to adulthood. Reproduction succeeds within a few weeks of hatching. Adults achieve a maximum size of around 3 inches (7.6 cm), which is considered large for a tadpole shrimp.

== Water chemistry ==
Triops australiensis can tolerate a pH of 7–9, and can live in both hard and soft water, but the eggs of T. australiensis are more likely to hatch in water with a low mineral content.
