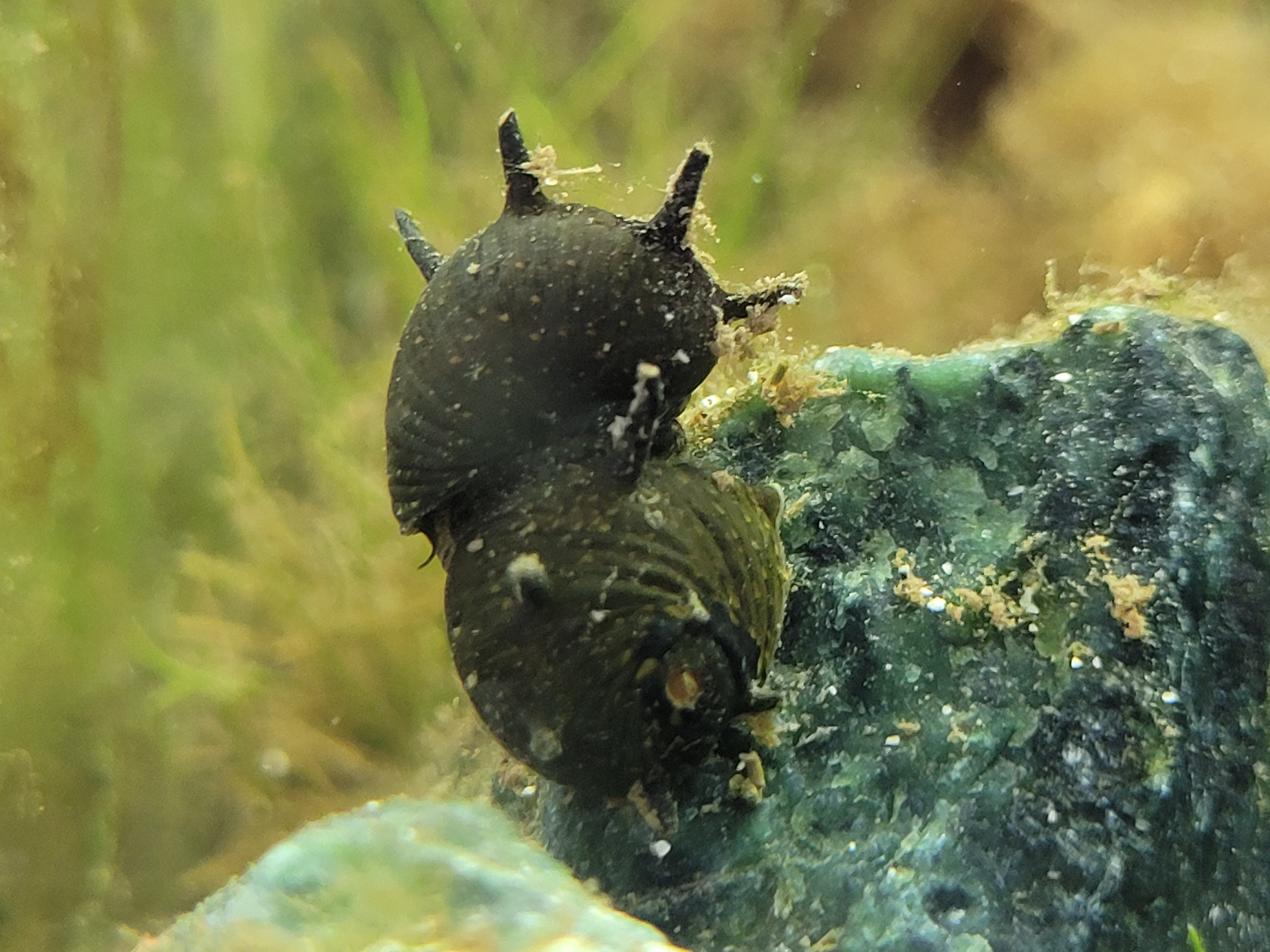
- Clithon corona from the Philippines
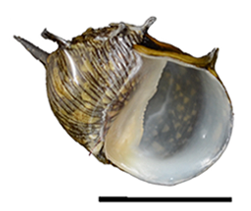
- Clithon corona shell. Scale bar is 10 mm.

Conservation status
- Least Concern (IUCN 3.1)

Scientific classification
- Kingdom: Animalia
- Phylum: Mollusca
- Class: Gastropoda
- Order: Cycloneritida
- Family: Neritidae
- Genus: Clithon
- Species: C. corona

Binomial name
- Clithon corona (Linnaeus, 1758)

Synonyms
- Clithon variabilis Lesson, 1831; Nerita cardinalis Le Guillou, 1841 (invalid: junior homonym of Nerita cardinalis Röding, 1798); Nerita corona Linnaeus, 1758 (original combination); Nerita keraudrenii Le Guillou, 1841; Nerita montacuti Récluz, 1843; Nerita montaguana Récluz, 1850; Nerita obscurata Récluz, 1842; Nerita recluziana Le Guillou, 1841; Neritina aspera Philippi, 1845; Neritina brevispina Lamarck, 1822; Neritina coronoides Lesson, 1831; Neritina corrugata Hombron & Jacquinot, 1848; Neritina deltoidea Mousson, 1870; Neritina discors Martens, 1878; Neritina flexuosa Hombron & Jacquinot, 1848; Neritina hapa Hombron & Jacquinot, 1848; Neritina monilifera Martens, 1878; Neritina musiva Hombron & Jacquinot, 1848; Neritina paya Gassies, 1858; Neritina rhitidophora Tapparone Canefri, 1893; Neritina ruida Mousson, 1857; Neritina subrugata Baird, 1873; Neritina unidentata Récluz, 1850; Neritina vitiana Mousson, 1870

= Clithon corona =

Species of gastropod

Clithon corona is a species of brackish water and freshwater snail with an operculum, a nerite. It is an aquatic gastropod mollusk in the family Neritidae, the nerites.

== Description ==
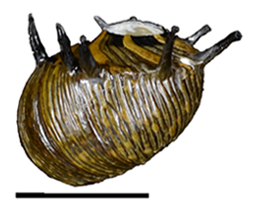
Abapertural view of Clithon corona shell.

Their shells are often small, about 0.5cm-2cm, rounded and covered with Calcified Shell Projections. Their main purpose is to deter off predators and make it harder for them to hunt the Snail down.

== Habitat ==
Clithon corona is an amphidromous benthic species that inhabits both freshwater rivers and brackish water estuaries. In these ecosystems, they typically reside in the intertidal zones or in fast-flowing streams where they use hard substrates to graze on algae.

== Ecology ==
The freshwater hermit crab Clibanarius fonticola uses shells of Clithon corona only.

== Human use ==
It is a part of ornamental pet trade for freshwater aquaria.
