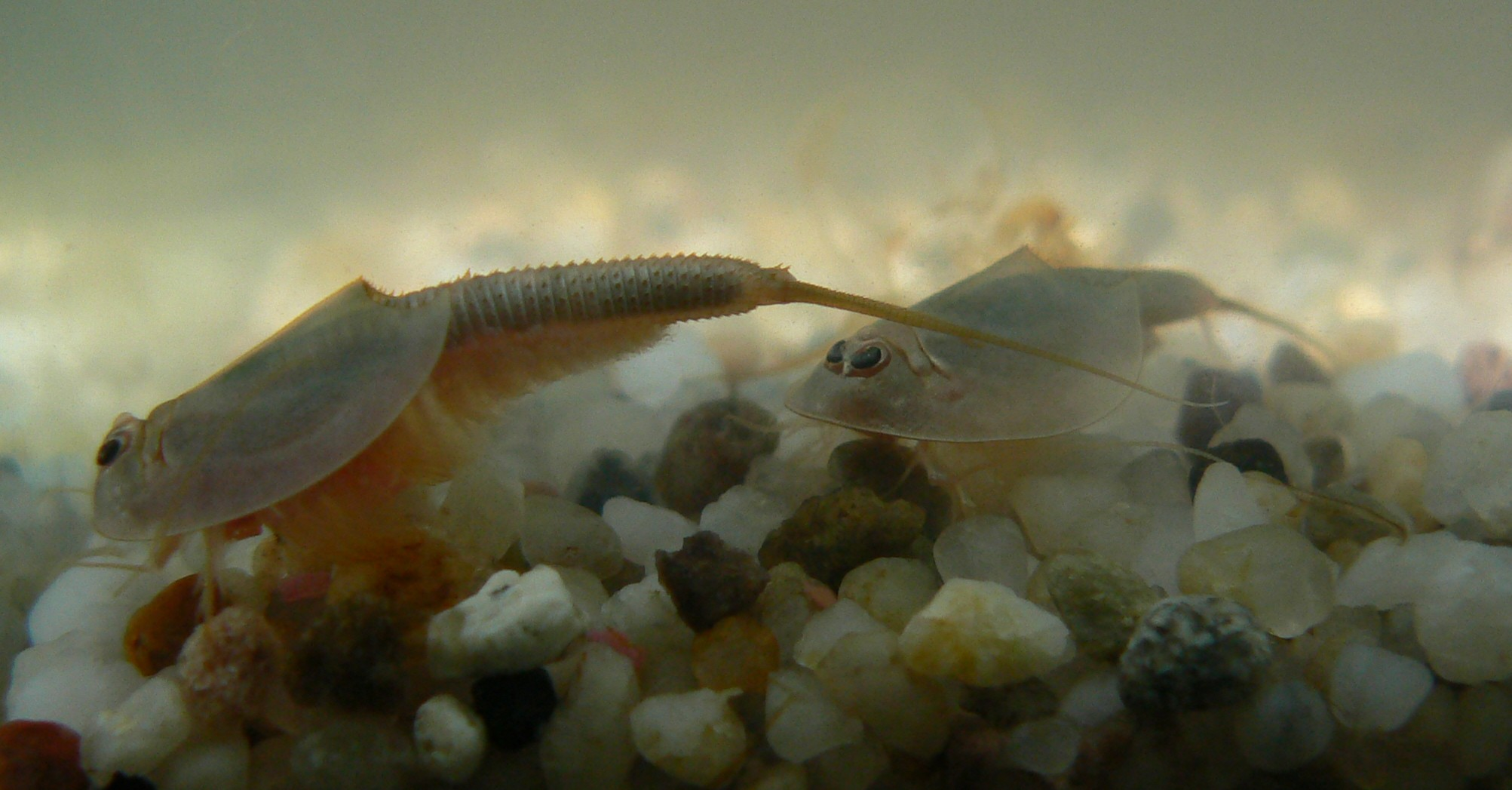
- Triops australiensis
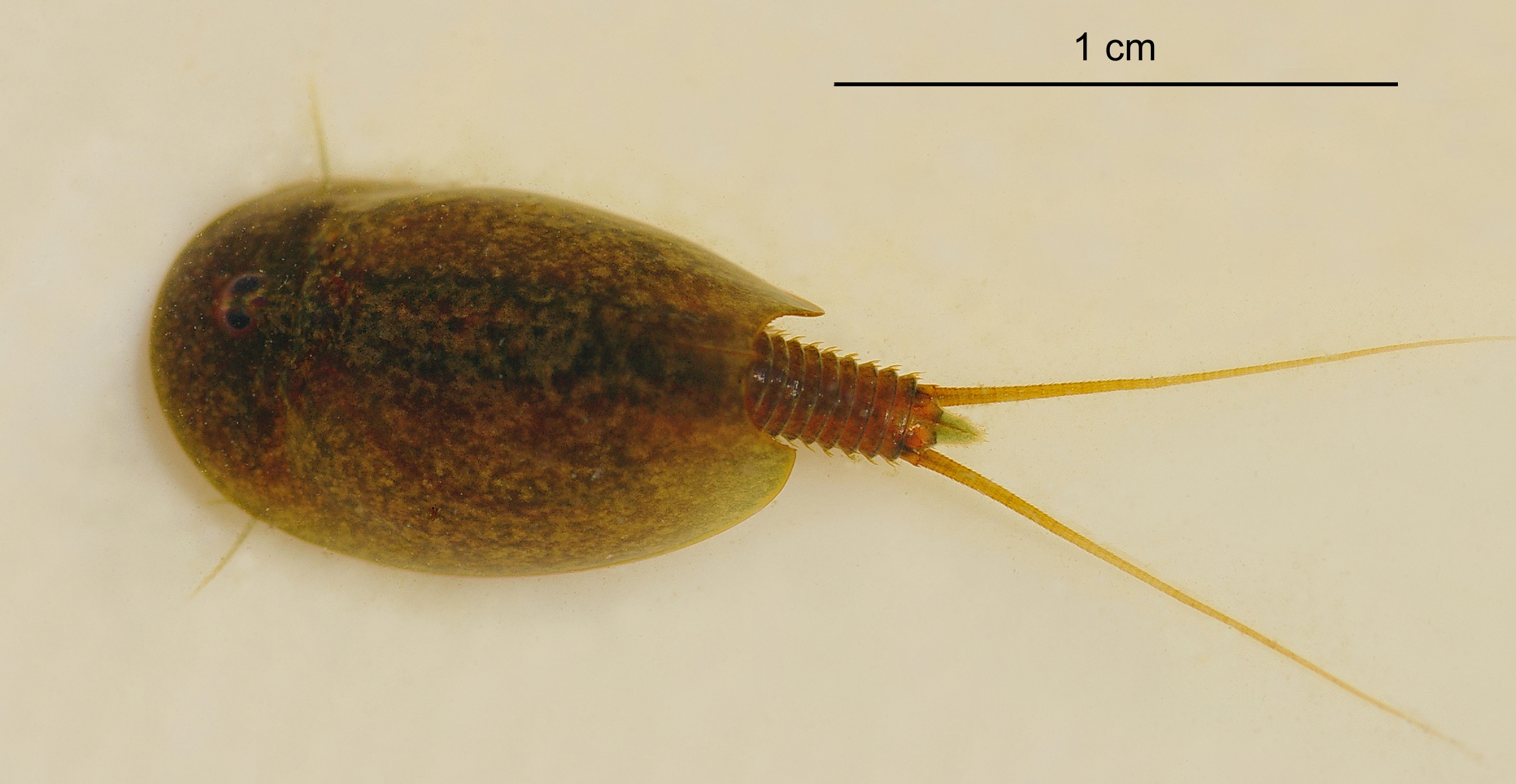
- Lepidurus apus

Scientific classification
- Kingdom: Animalia
- Phylum: Arthropoda
- Clade: Pancrustacea
- Class: Branchiopoda
- Superorder: Calmanostraca
- Order: Notostraca; G. O. Sars, 1867

Genera
- Lepidurus Leach, 1819; Triops Schrank, 1803; Fossil genera and species, see text

= Notostraca =

Notostraca Temporal range: Famennian–Recent

Order of small freshwater animals

The order Notostraca, containing the single family Triopsidae, is a group of crustaceans known as tadpole shrimp or shield shrimp. The two genera, Triops and Lepidurus, are considered living fossils, with similar forms having existed since the end of the Devonian, around 360 million years ago. They have a broad, flat carapace, which conceals the head and bears a single pair of compound eyes. The abdomen is long, appears to be segmented and bears numerous pairs of flattened legs. The telson is flanked by a pair of long, thin caudal rami. Phenotypic plasticity within taxa makes species-level identification difficult, and is further compounded by variation in the mode of reproduction. Notostracans are omnivores living on the bottom of temporary pools and shallow lakes.

== Description ==
Notostracans are 2–5 centimetres (0.8–2.0 in) long, with a broad carapace at the front end, and a long, slender abdomen. This gives them a similar overall shape to a tadpole, from which the common name tadpole shrimp derives. The carapace is dorso-ventrally flattened, smooth, and bears no rostrum; it includes the head, and the two sessile compound eyes are located together on top of the head. The two pairs of antennae are much reduced, with the second pair sometimes missing altogether. The mouthparts comprise a pair of uniramous mandibles and no maxillipeds.

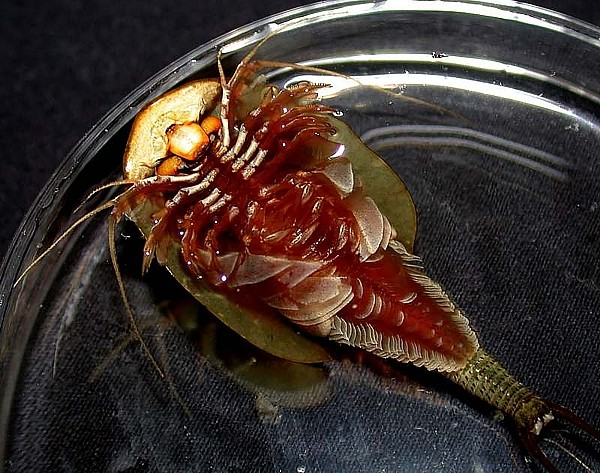
The ventral side of Triops australiensis, showing the many pairs of phyllopodous legs

The trunk consists of three regions; thorax I, thorax II and the abdomen. Thorax I is made up of 11 segments, each with a pair of well-developed limbs and the genital opening on the eleventh segment. In the female, it is modified to form a "brood pouch". The first one or two pairs of legs differ from the remainder, and probably function as sensory organs.

The somites on thorax II are fused into "rings", which varies in number between species and gender and appear to be body segments, but do not always reflect the underlying segmentation. Each ring is made up of 2–6 complete or partial fused segments, and the number of legs on each body ring match its number of segments. The legs become progressively smaller posteriorly, with the last segments being legless.

The limbless abdomen ends in a telson and a pair of long, thin, multi-articulate caudal rami. The form of the telson varies between the two genera: in Lepidurus, a rounded projection extends between the caudal rami, while in Triops there is no such projection.

== Life cycle ==
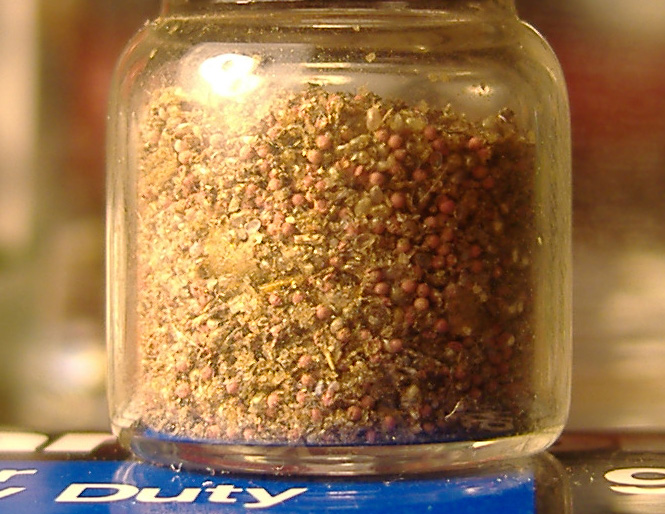
A collection of lake sediment containing the pink eggs of Triops longicaudatus

Within the Notostraca, and even within species, there is variation in the mode of reproduction, with some populations reproducing sexually, some showing self-fertilisation of females, and some showing a mix of the two. The frequency of males in populations is therefore highly variable. In sexual populations, the sperm leave the male's body through simple pores, there being no penis. The eggs are released by the female and then held in the cup-like brood pouch. The eggs are retained by the female only for a short time before being laid, and the larvae develop directly, without passing through a metamorphosis.

== Ecology and distribution ==
Notostracans are omnivorous, eating small animals such as fishes and fairy shrimp. They are found worldwide in freshwater, brackish water, or saline pools, as well as in shallow lakes, peat bogs, and moorland. The species Triops longicaudatus is considered an agricultural pest in California rice paddies, because it prevents light from reaching the rice seedlings by stirring up sediment.

== Evolution and fossil record ==
The fossil record of Notostraca is extensive, occurring in a wide range of geological deposits. The oldest known notostracan is the species Strudops goldenbergi from the Late Devonian (Famennian ~ 365 million years ago) of Belgium. The lack of major morphological change since 250 million years ago has led to Notostraca being described as living fossils. Kazacharthra, a group known only from Triassic and Jurassic fossils from Kazakhstan and Western China, are closely related to notostracans, and may belong within the order Notostraca, or alternatively are placed as their sister group within the clade Calmanostraca.

The "central autapomorphy" of the Notostraca is the abandonment of filter feeding in open water, and the development of a benthic lifestyle in muddy waters, taking up food from particles of sediment and preying on small animals. A number of other characteristics are correlated with this change, including the increased size of the animal compared to its relatives, and the loss of the ability to hinge the carapace; although a central keel marks the former separation into two valves, the adductor muscle is missing. Notostracans retain the plesiomorphic condition of having two separate compound eyes, which abut, but have not become united, as seen in other groups of Branchiopoda.

== Taxonomy ==
The extant members of order Notostraca composed a single family, Triopsidae, with only two genera, Triops and Lepidurus. The problematic Middle Ordovician fossil Douglasocaris has been erected and placed in its own family Douglasocaridae by Caster & Brooks 1956, and may be ancestral to Notostraca.

The phenotypic plasticity shown by notostracan species make identification to the species level difficult. Many putative species have been described based on morphological variation, such that by the 1950s, as many as 70 species were recognised. Two important revisions – those of Linder in 1952 and Longhurst in 1955 – synonymised many taxa, and resulted in the recognition of only 11 species in the two genera. This taxonomy was accepted for decades, "even attaining the status of dogma". More recent studies, especially those employing molecular phylogenetics, have shown that the eleven currently recognised species conceal a greater number of reproductively isolated populations.

=== Genera list ===
==== Extant ====
- Triops, worldwide except Antarctica
- Lepidurus, worldwide except Antarctica

==== Extinct ====
- Apudites, (Formerly "Notostraca" minor, often referred to as Triops cancriformis minor, or "Triops" minor in historic literature) Lower Triassic, Grès à Voltzia, Vosges Mountains, France; Hassberge Formation, Germany, Late Triassic (Carnian)
- Brachygastriops Dabeigou Formation, China, Late Jurassic or Early Cretaceous
- Chenops Yixian Formation, China, Early Cretaceous (Aptian)
- Dikelocephala, Lower Triassic of North China
- Discocephala, Lower Triassic of North China
- Heidiops, Lower Permian of the Lodève Basin, France
- Jeholops Yixian Formation, China, Early Cretaceous (Aptian)
- Lynceites Germany, Canada, Carboniferous
- Prolepidurus, Late Jurassic?-Lower Cretaceous, Transbaikal, Russia
- Strudops Strud locality, Belgium, late Devonian (Fammenian)
- Thuringiops, Upper Oberhof Formation, Thuringian Forest Basin, Carboniferous Germany
- Weichangiops Dabeigou Formation, China, Late Jurassic or Early Cretaceous
- Xinjiangiops Kelamayi Formation, China, Middle Triassic

Incertae sedis species

- "Notostraca" oleseni Yixian Formation, China, Early Cretaceous (Aptian)
- "Calmanostraca" hassbergella Hassberge Formation, Germany, Late Triassic (Carnian)

== See also ==
- Trilobite
