= Wildlife of Missouri =

Flora and fauna of the US state of Missouri

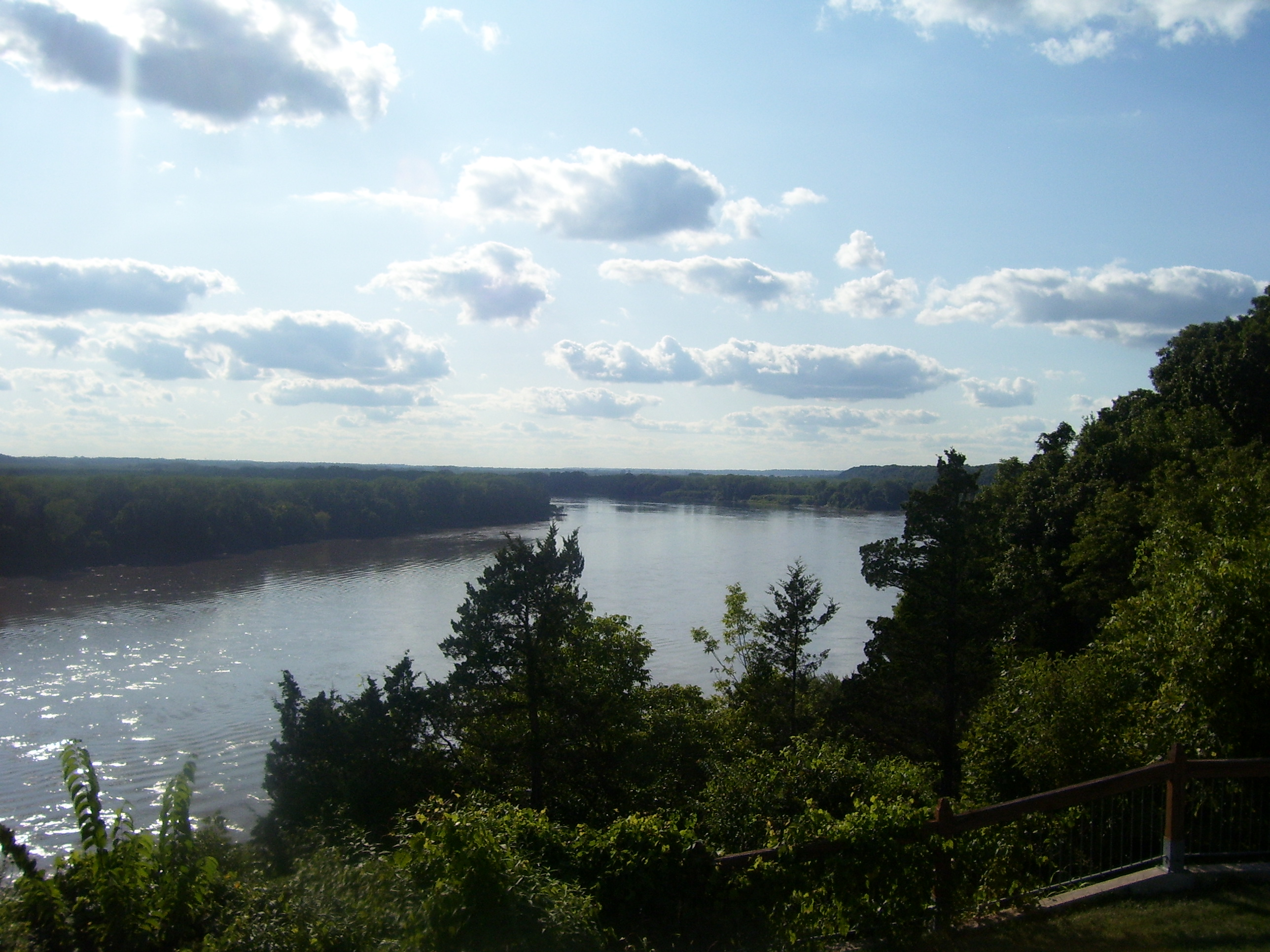
Missouri River near Rocheport, Missouri

Missouri is home to a diversity of flora, fauna and funga. There is a large amount of fresh water present due to the Mississippi River, Missouri River, and Lake of the Ozarks, with numerous smaller rivers, streams, and lakes. North of the Missouri River, the state is primarily rolling hills of the Great Plains, whereas south of the Missouri River, the state is dominated by the oak-hickory Central U.S. hardwood forest.

Some of the native species found in Missouri are included below.

== Mammals ==
- Opossum
- Nine-banded armadillo
- Muskrat
- Beaver
- Eastern mole
- Little brown bat
- Big brown bat
- Mexican free-tailed bat
- Silver-haired bat
- Least shrew
- American short-tailed shrew
- Southern bog lemming
- Meadow vole
- Woodland vole
- Hispid pocket mouse
- Meadow jumping mouse
- Plains harvest mouse
- Deer mouse
- Hispid cotton rat
- Eastern woodrat
- Marsh rice rat
- Plains pocket gopher
- Fox squirrel
- Southern flying squirrel
- Eastern gray squirrel
- Eastern chipmunk
- Thirteen-lined ground squirrel
- Woodchuck
- Eastern cottontail
- Badger
- Raccoon
- Spotted skunk
- Striped skunk
- Long-tailed weasel
- American mink
- River otter
- Red fox
- Gray fox
- Coyote
- American black bear
- Cougar
- Bobcat
- White-tailed deer

Within historic times, pronghorn, Great Plains wolf, Gregory's wolf, and brown bear were all found in Missouri, but have since been extirpated. American bison and elk were formerly common, but are currently confined to private farms and parks. Elk can be found in a small restoration zone in three counties in the southeast Ozarks.

== Birds ==
Year-round:

- Pied-billed grebe
- Great blue heron
- Canada goose
- Mallard
- Wood duck
- Killdeer
- Common snipe
- American woodcock
- Turkey vulture
- Red-tailed hawk
- Cooper's hawk
- Red-shouldered hawk
- American kestrel
- Northern harrier
- Northern bobwhite
- Wild turkey
- Ring-necked pheasant
- Rock dove
- Mourning dove
- Belted kingfisher
- Barn owl
- Barred owl
- Great horned owl
- Short-eared owl
- Long-eared owl
- Eastern screech owl
- Northern saw-whet owl
- Horned lark
- Common crow
- Blue jay
- Red-bellied woodpecker
- Red-headed woodpecker
- Pileated woodpecker
- Downy woodpecker
- Hairy woodpecker
- Northern flicker
- Black-capped chickadee
- Carolina chickadee
- White-breasted nuthatch
- Tufted titmouse
- Northern mockingbird
- Loggerhead shrike
- American robin
- Eastern bluebird
- Pine warbler
- Eastern meadowlark
- Red-winged blackbird
- European starling
- Common grackle
- Northern cardinal
- American goldfinch
- Eastern towhee
- Song sparrow
- Field sparrow
- House sparrow
- Carolina wren
- Bewick's wren
- Wood thrush
- Brown thrasher

Summer/breeders:

- Green-backed heron
- Black-crowned night heron
- Yellow-crowned night heron
- Little blue heron
- American bittern
- Least bittern
- Great egret
- Cattle egret
- White ibis
- White-faced ibis
- Virginia rail
- King rail
- Spotted sandpiper
- Upland sandpiper
- Sora
- Common moorhen
- American coot
- Northern pintail
- Northern shoveler
- Blue-winged teal
- Hooded merganser
- Least tern
- Black tern
- Black vulture
- Mississippi kite
- Broad-winged hawk
- Sharp-shinned hawk
- Yellow-billed cuckoo
- Black-billed cuckoo
- Common nighthawk
- Chimney swift
- Ruby-throated hummingbird
- American white pelican
- Double-crested cormorant
- Chuck-will's-widow
- Whip-poor-will
- Eastern kingbird
- Scissor-tailed flycatcher
- Eastern phoebe
- Great crested flycatcher
- Eastern wood pewee
- Willow flycatcher
- Least flycatcher
- Acadian flycatcher
- Yellow-bellied flycatcher
- Scarlet tanager
- Summer tanager
- Barn swallow
- Tree swallow
- Bank swallow
- Northern rough-winged swallow
- Cliff swallow
- Purple martin
- House wren
- Carolina wren
- Gray catbird
- Brown thrasher
- Wood thrush
- Warbling vireo
- Red-eyed vireo
- Yellow-throated vireo
- Bell's vireo
- Black and white warbler
- Prothonotary warbler
- Blue-winged warbler
- Northern parula
- Cerulean warbler
- Prairie warbler
- Pine warbler
- Yellow warbler
- Yellow-throated warbler
- Kentucky warbler
- Hooded warbler
- Hooded warbler
- Worm-eating warbler
- Louisiana waterthrush
- Ovenbird
- American redstart
- Baltimore oriole
- Orchard oriole
- Northern oriole
- Common yellowthroat
- Yellow-breasted chat
- Bobolink
- Yellow-headed blackbird
- Brown-headed cowbird
- Blue grosbeak
- Indigo bunting
- Painted bunting
- Rose-breasted grosbeak
- Black-headed grosbeak
- Grasshopper sparrow
- Savannah sparrow
- Lark sparrow
- Chipping sparrow
- Henslow's sparrow
- Vesper sparrow
- Fish crow
- House wren
- Marsh wren
- Sedge wren
- Blue-gray gnatcatcher
- Dickcissel

Winter residents:

- Green-winged teal
- Black duck
- Gadwall
- Ruddy duck
- Canvasback
- Redhead
- Ring-necked duck
- Lesser scaup
- Bufflehead
- Common goldeneye
- American herring gull
- Ring-billed gull
- Bald eagle
- Golden eagle
- Rough-legged hawk
- Merlin
- Ruffed grouse
- Greater prairie chicken
- Brown creeper
- Red-breasted nuthatch
- Winter wren
- Hermit thrush
- Yellow-bellied sapsucker
- Cedar waxwing
- Golden-crowned kinglet
- American tree sparrow
- American pipit
- Dark-eyed junco
- Purple finch
- Evening grosbeak
- Red crossbill
- White-throated sparrow
- White-crowned sparrow
- Fox sparrow
- Swamp sparrow
- Cedar waxwing
- Lapland longspur
- Snow bunting
- Rusty blackbird
- Brewer's blackbird
- Pine siskin

Within historic times, the passenger pigeon, the Carolina parakeet, and the ivory-billed woodpecker were all found in Missouri, but they have since been extirpated.

== Reptiles ==
Reptiles of Missouri include:

- Alligator snapping turtle
- Snapping turtle
- Stinkpot
- Eastern mud turtle
- Northern map turtle
- False map turtle
- Eastern box turtle
- Western box turtle
- Painted turtle
- Blanding's turtle
- Red-eared slider
- Chicken turtle
- Smooth softshell turtle
- Spiny softshell turtle
- Collared lizard
- Texas horned lizard
- Eastern fence lizard
- Coal skink
- Broadhead skink
- Ground skink
- Five-lined skink
- Six-lined racerunner
- Slender glass lizard
- Western worm snake
- Black racer
- Ringneck snake
- Scarlet snake
- Mud snake
- Corn snake
- Rat snake
- Fox snake
- Milk snake
- Eastern hognose snake
- Common kingsnake
- Coachwhip
- Smooth green snake
- Northern water snake
- Diamondback water snake
- Plain-bellied water snake
- Bullsnake
- Graham's crayfish snake
- Common garter snake
- Cottonmouth
- Copperhead
- Western pygmy rattlesnake
- Timber rattlesnake
- Massasauga

== Amphibians ==
Amphibians of Missouri include:

- Common mudpuppy
- Western lesser siren
- Hellbender
- Spotted salamander
- Marbled salamander
- Eastern tiger salamander
- Dusky salamander
- Long-tailed salamander
- Red-backed salamander
- Four-toed salamander
- Ringed salamander
- Mole salamander
- Small-mouthed salamander
- Central newt
- Three-toed amphiuma
- Cave salamander
- Grotto salamander
- Gray-bellied salamander
- Western slimy salamander
- Ozark zigzag salamander
- Southern red-backed salamander
- Eastern spadefoot toad
- Plains spadefoot toad
- Fowler's toad
- Great Plains toad
- Common toad
- Woodhouse's toad
- Eastern American toad
- Eastern narrow-mouthed toad
- Great Plains narrow-mouthed toad
- Striped chorus frog
- Illinois chorus frog
- Upland chorus frog
- Northern crawfish frog
- Blanchard's cricket frog
- Northern cricket frog
- Northern spring peeper
- Gray tree frog
- Green tree frog
- Green frog
- Bullfrog
- Pickerel frog
- Wood frog
- Northern leopard frog
- Southern leopard frog
- Plains leopard frog

== Fish ==
- Lamprey
- Sturgeon
- Paddlefish
- Longnose gar
- Mooneye
- Bowfin
- Herring
- American eel
- Northern pike
- Rainbow trout
- Carp
- Fathead minnow
- Channel catfish
- Trout-perch
- Livebearer
- Striped bass
- Largemouth bass
- Bluegill
- Walleye
- Yellow perch

== Molluscs ==
- Asiatic clam
- Butterfly mussel
- Common tadpole snail
- Deertoe
- Eastern mystery snail
- Ebonyshell
- Elephant-ear
- Elktoe
- Filter mussel
- Fingernail clams
- Fragile Papershell
- Giant floater
- Mapleleaf
- Monkeyface
- Paper pondshell
- Pearl mussel
- Pimpleback
- Pink heelsplitter
- Pink mucket
- Pink papershell
- Plain pocketbook
- Pondmussel
- Purple wartyback
- Round pigtoe
- Scaleshell mussel
- Sheepnose mussel
- Snuffbox mussel
- Spectaclecase
- Stagnant pond snail
- Striped forest snail
- Three-horn wartyback
- Three-whorled ram's horn
- Threeridge
- Wabash pigtoe
- Yellow sandshell
- White-lipped forest snail
- Zebra mussel

== Crustaceans ==
- Barr’s cave amphipod
- Big Creek crayfish
- Bristly cave crayfish
- Caecidotea antricola
- Cajun dwarf crayfish
- Calico crayfish
- Caney Mountain cave crayfish
- Central Missouri cave amphipod (Hubricht’s long-tailed amphipod)
- Clam shrimp
- Devil crayfish
- Mammoth Spring crayfish
- Ohio shrimp
- Ozark cave amphipod
- Painted devil crayfish
- Painted mudbug
- Pillbugs
- Red swamp crayfish
- Ringed crayfish
- Salem cave crayfish
- Shrimp crayfish
- Swamp dwarf crayfish
- Virile crayfish
- White river crayfish
- St. Francis River crayfish
- Woodland crayfish

== Insect migrations ==
There has also been a migration of insects from the south to Missouri. One example of this is the wasp Polistes exclamans.

== See also ==
- Fauna of the United States
- North American Prairies province
- List of Missouri native plants
- Missouri Conservationist
