= Lacunicambarus chimera =

Crawzilla crawdad

Scientific classification
- Domain: Eukaryota
- Kingdom: Animalia
- Phylum: Arthropoda
- Class: Malacostraca
- Order: Decapoda
- Suborder: Pleocyemata
- Family: Cambaridae
- Genus: Lacunicambarus
- Species: L. chimera

Binomial name
- Lacunicambarus chimera Glon & Thoma, 2019
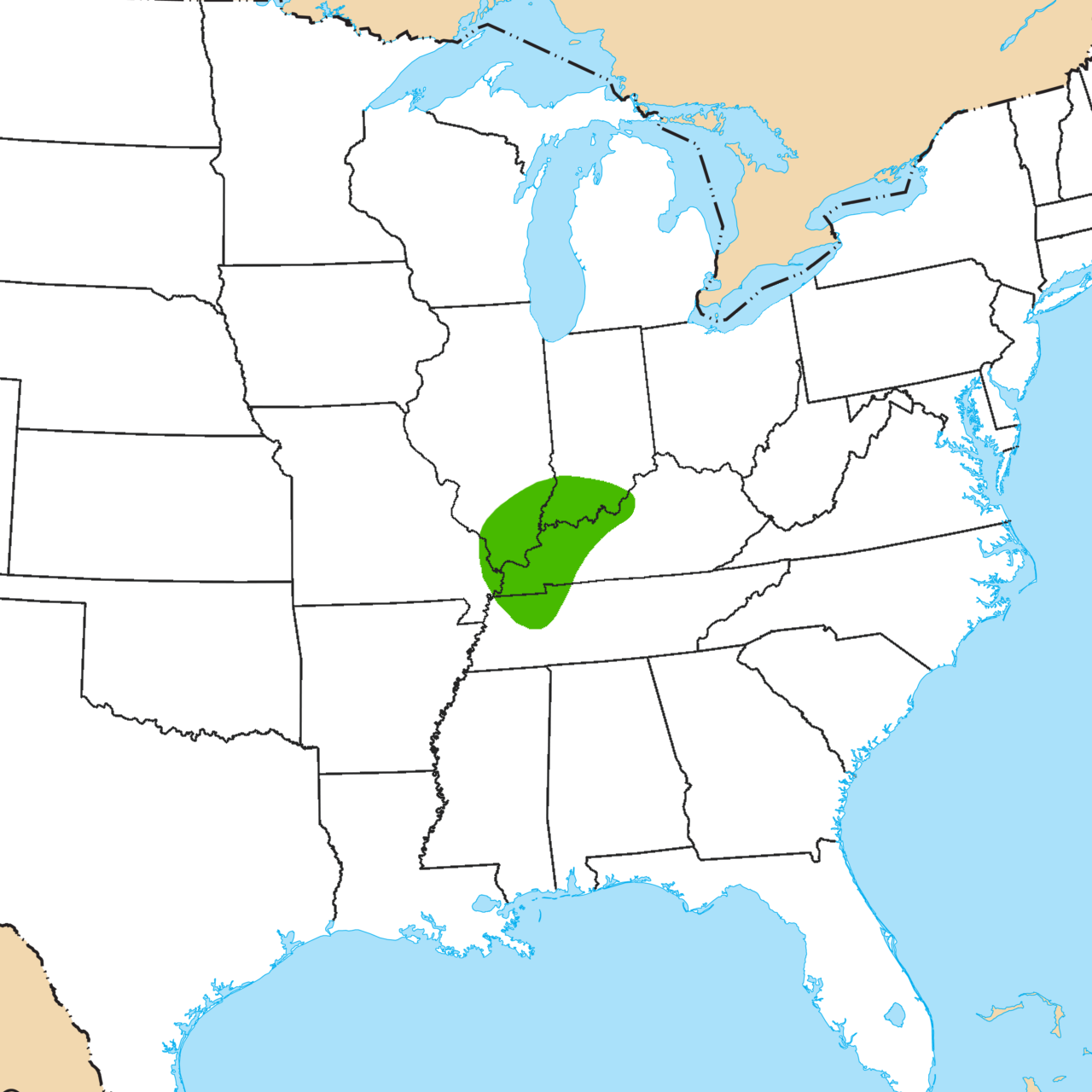
- Estimated range of Lacunicambarus chimera, shaded in green

Species of crustacean

Lacunicambarus chimera, or the Crawzilla crawdad, is a species of cambarid crayfish endemic to the U.S. states of Illinois, Indiana, Kentucky, Missouri, and Tennessee.

== Description ==
Compared to other species of crayfish in its range, L. chimera is a sizable crayfish. On average, adults of this species range from about 9.5 to 11.8 centimeters (or 3.7 to 4.7 inches) in body length, measuring from the anterior tip of the rostrum to the posterior tip of the telson.

The overall main body is predominantly olive, yellow-green, or golden in color, with the tail fan fading into a soft periwinkle. The legs and the bottom side of the body range from a light blue or white to a soft cream in color. A light-colored stripe runs along the margins of the areola and down the abdomen; this stripe is sometimes faintly present in adults, but it is much more pronounced in juveniles and young adults.

== Range ==
v chimera has been observed in the Ohio River Basin in southern Indiana, Illinois, and western Kentucky, the Lower Mississippi River and Tennessee River Basins in western Kentucky and Tennessee, and the Upper Mississippi River Basin in Illinois.

== Habitat ==
Burrows of L. chimera are commonly found in fine-grained soils along the floodplains of streams and rivers and in roadside ditches.

== Ecology ==
Lacunicambarus chimera is an opportunistic omnivore, readily consuming earthworms, snails, and leaf litter in streams. This species is mostly active at night, often foraging for food. Compared to other species of crayfish, L. chimera is not particularly aggressive towards other individuals of its species.

== Etymology ==
The specific epithet "chimera" stems from the way that some individuals of this species may appear to be a chimera of multiple other species of Lacunicambarus; L. chimera bears a bright longitudinal stripe reminiscent of the stripe seen in L. ludovicianus, L. miltus, and some populations of L. polychromatus. The bright colors of L. chimera are similar to those found in L. polychromatus, and the general shape of L. chimera is reminiscent to that of L. diogenes.

The common name "Crawzilla crawdad" was established as a reference to the species' impressive size.
