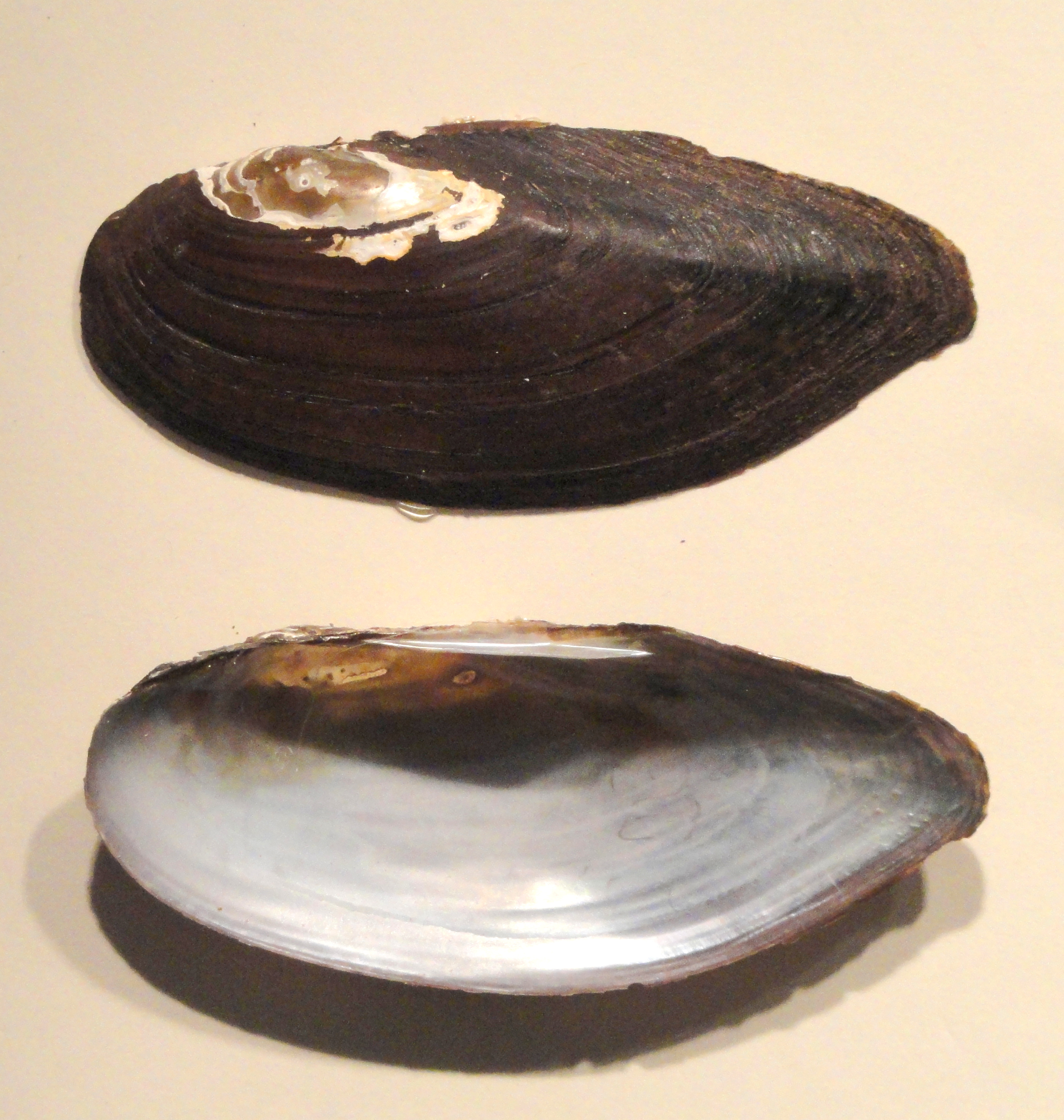

Conservation status
- Vulnerable (IUCN 3.1)

- Vulnerable (NatureServe)

Scientific classification
- Kingdom: Animalia
- Phylum: Mollusca
- Class: Bivalvia
- Order: Unionida
- Family: Unionidae
- Subfamily: Ambleminae
- Tribe: Lampsilini
- Genus: Sagittunio
- Species: S. nasutus

Binomial name
- Sagittunio nasutus (Say, 1817)

Synonyms
- Lampsilis (Eurynia) nasuta (Say, 1817); Lampsilis (Eurynia) nasutus (Say, 1817); Lampsilis (Ligumia) nasuta (Say, 1817); Lampsilis nasuta (Say, 1817); Ligumia nasuta (Say, 1817); Margarita (Unio) nasutus (Say, 1817); Margaron (Unio) nasutus (Say, 1817); Obliquaria (Ellipsaria) attenuata Rafinesque, 1820 (synonym); Unio nasutus Say, 1817 (original combination)

= Sagittunio nasutus =

Species of bivalve

Sagittunio nasutus, the eastern pondmussel, is a species of freshwater mussel in the family Unionidae, the river mussels.

This species is native to the eastern United States and Ontario, Canada. In Canada, the eastern pondmussel has been adversely affected by zebra mussels, which were introduced near the end of the 1980s. Originally assessed as endangered due to the existence of only two known Canadian populations, the eastern pondmussel was placed on Schedule 1 of the Species at Risk Act in 2013. However, a reassessment by the Committee on the Status of Endangered Wildlife in Canada in 2017 identified seventeen additional subpopulations, and the eastern pondmussel was relisted as "special concern" in August 2019. The population of the lower Great Lakes has limited diversity in certain mitochondrial genetic markers compared to those of the eastern seaboard's population, evidence of a founder effect and suggestive of a post-glacial arrival of Atlantic coast mussels to the Great Lakes by a restricted route. The Walpole Island First Nation protects a population of eastern pondmussels residing in their tribal waters within the delta of Lake St. Clair.

Like many Unionoid mussels, female eastern pondmussels display a lure to attract their fish hosts (see video, right).

Female Ligumia nasuta displaying her lure
