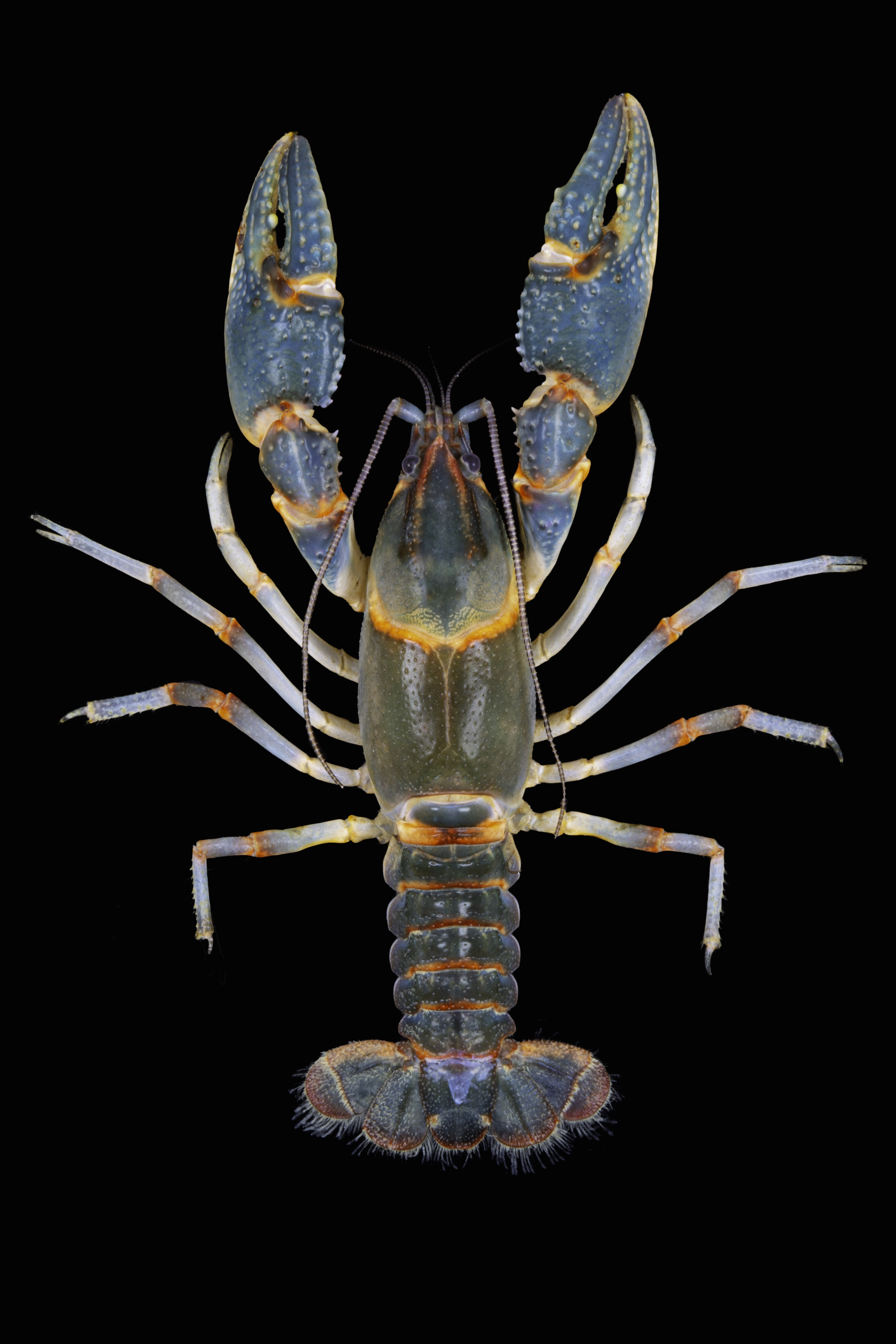
- Banded mudbug, Lacunicambarus freudensteini, holotype

Conservation status
- Critically Imperiled (NatureServe)

Scientific classification
- Domain: Eukaryota
- Kingdom: Animalia
- Phylum: Arthropoda
- Class: Malacostraca
- Order: Decapoda
- Suborder: Pleocyemata
- Family: Cambaridae
- Genus: Lacunicambarus
- Species: L. freudensteini

Binomial name
- Lacunicambarus freudensteini Glon, 2020

= Lacunicambarus freudensteini =

Banded mudbug

Species of crayfish

Lacunicambarus freudensteini, the banded mudbug, is a species of North American burrowing crayfish found in Alabama and Mississippi.

== Description ==
The banded mudbug is a small (maximum size: ~2–2.5 inches) primary burrowing crayfish. This crayfish is typically blue overall with orange highlights on its joints, although rare bright blue and pink specimens have also been collected. Because of this species' exceedingly small range and overall rarity, this species is ranked as S1 (Critically imperiled) in both states where it occurs (Alabama and Mississippi) and has a NatureServe global rank of G1 (Critically imperiled).

== Range ==
The banded mudbug is a very rare species known only from nine sites in Mobile County, Alabama and Jackson County, Mississippi.

== Habitat ==
The banded mudbug is typically found burrowing in open, non-sloping grasslands with a shallow claypan.

== Etymology ==
The banded mudbug was named after Dr. John Freudenstein. The common name "banded mudbug" refers to the orange bands on the dorsal side of this species and as the fact that it is a primary burrowing crayfish (often called "mudbugs").
