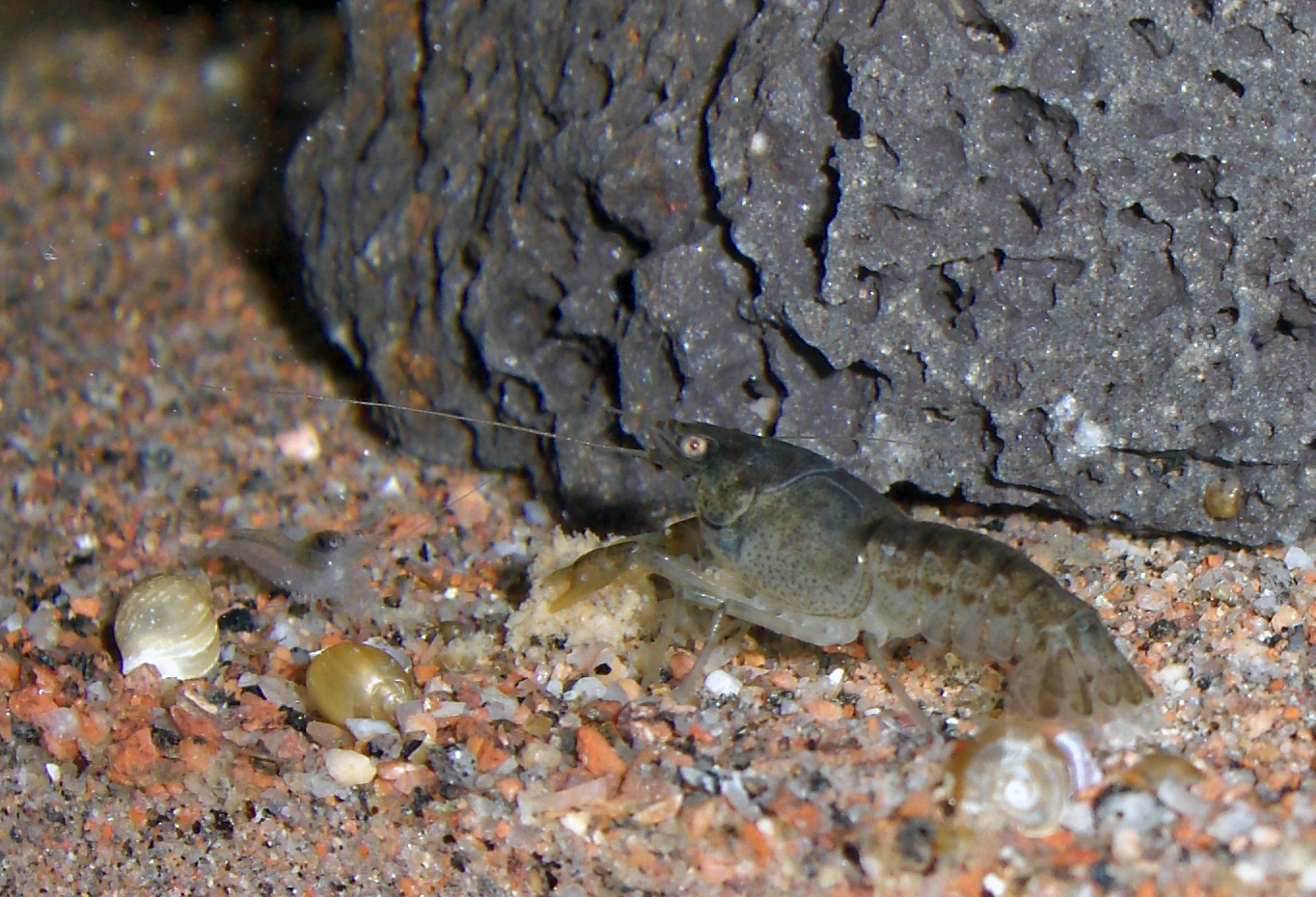

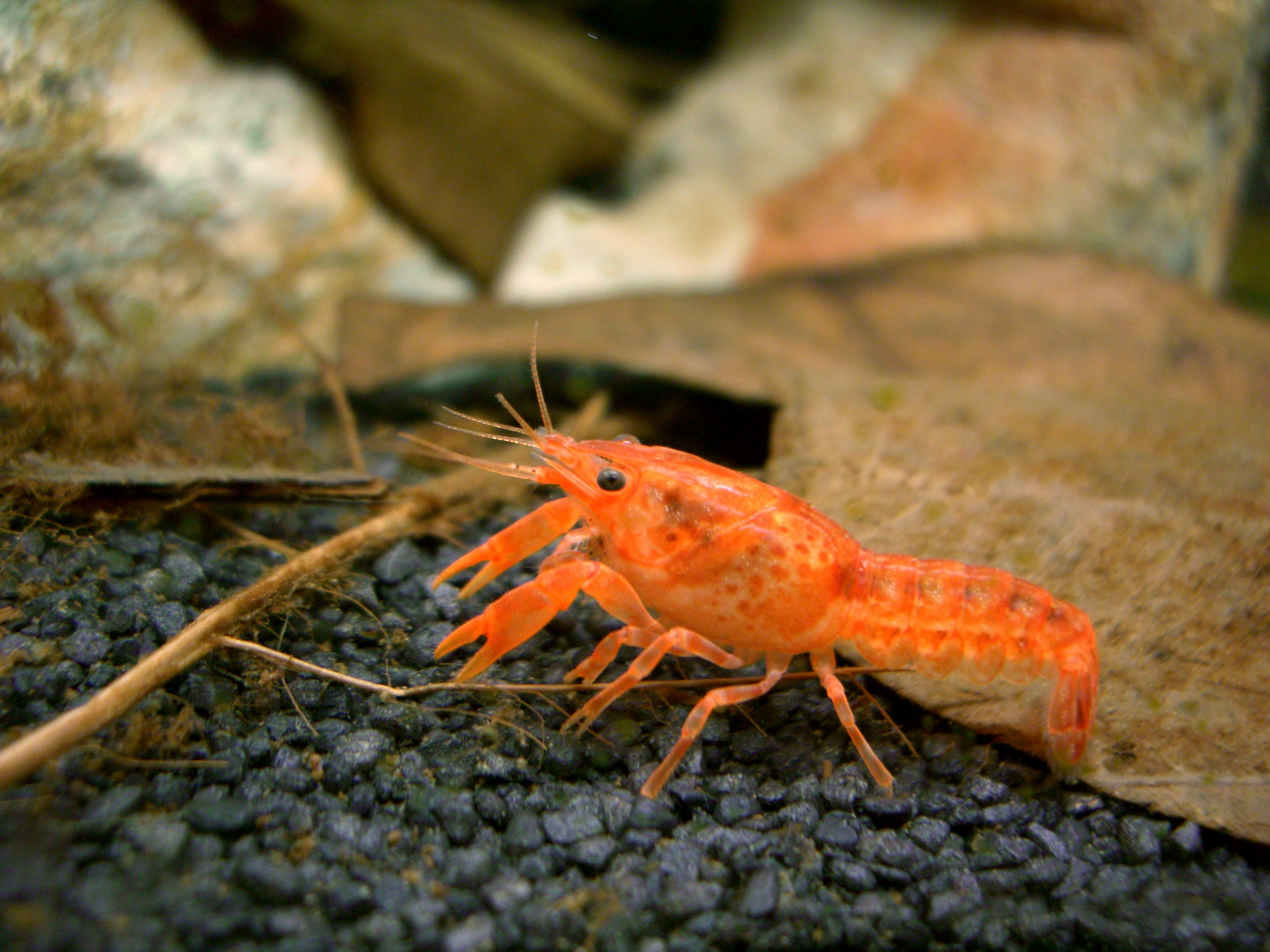
- Typical wild form (above) and orange aquarium form (below)

Conservation status
- Endangered (IUCN 3.1)

Scientific classification
- Kingdom: Animalia
- Phylum: Arthropoda
- Clade: Pancrustacea
- Class: Malacostraca
- Order: Decapoda
- Suborder: Pleocyemata
- Family: Cambaridae
- Genus: Cambarellus
- Species: C. patzcuarensis

Binomial name
- Cambarellus patzcuarensis Villalobos, 1943

= Cambarellus patzcuarensis =

Species of crayfish

Cambarellus patzcuarensis is a small, threatened species of crayfish in the family Cambaridae. It is endemic to Michoacán in Mexico and often kept in aquariums.

== Description ==
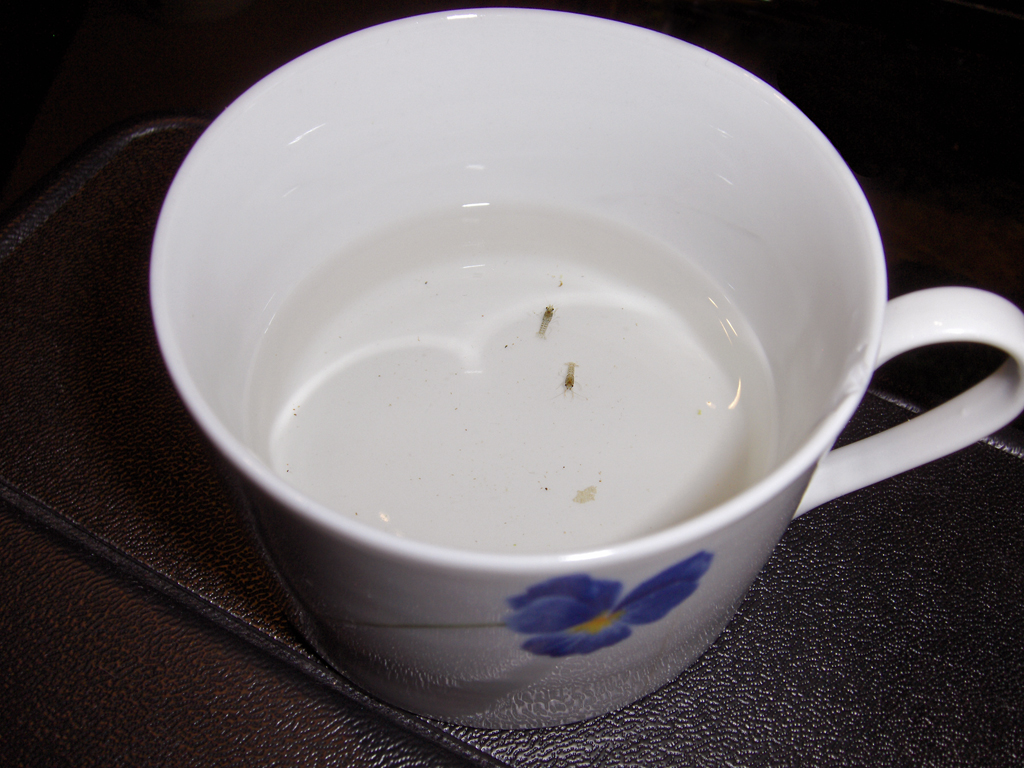
Juvenile Cambarellus patzcuarensis, about a week after being detached from their mother. The diameter of the cup is 8.9 centimetres (approximately 3.5 inches) and was used for this photo session only. Crayfish are cannibalistic, and siblings can't be kept together in small containers for any lengthy period of time.

It measures 4–5 centimetres (1.6–2.0 in) in total length, including claws. Most specimens found in the wild are brown, sometimes with a gray or blue tint. Cambarellus patzcuarensis var. "Orange" (Mexican dwarf crayfish, sometimes Mexican dwarf orange crayfish) is an orange-coloured mutation often held in aquariums, but this form is rarely found in the wild.

== Distribution ==
The species is named after Lake Pátzcuaro, at an altitude of 2,035 metres (6,677 ft) in Michoacán, Mexico. Besides in Lake Pátzcuaro, C. patzcuarensis also occurs in springs in Chapultepec, Opopeo and Tzurumutaro.

== Conservation ==
C. patzcuarensis is listed as an endangered species on the IUCN Red List.
