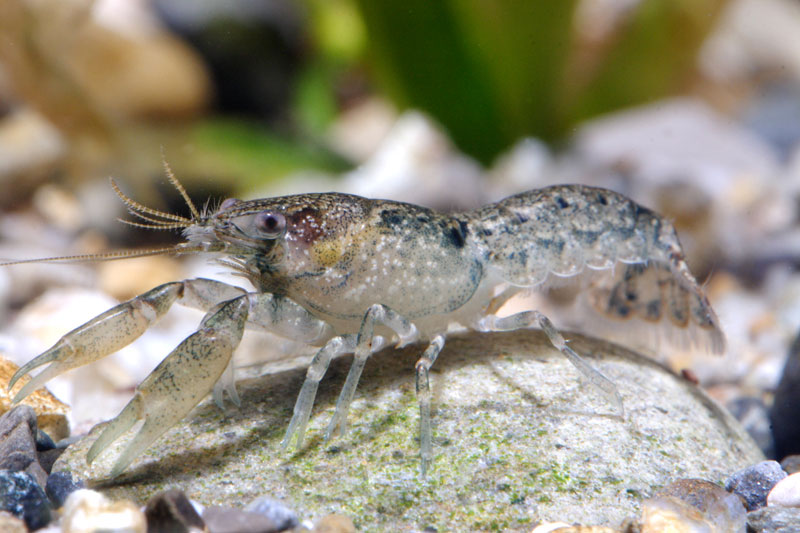
- Cambarellus lesliei

Scientific classification
- Kingdom: Animalia
- Phylum: Arthropoda
- Clade: Pancrustacea
- Class: Malacostraca
- Order: Decapoda
- Suborder: Pleocyemata
- Family: Cambaridae
- Genus: Cambarellus; Ortmann, 1905

Type species
- Cambarus montezumae de Saussure, 1857

= Cambarellus =

Genus of crayfishes

Cambarellus is a genus of small freshwater crayfish in the family Cambaridae. The 19 species are found in Mexico (subgenus Cambarellus) and the Gulf States of the United States (subgenus Pandicambarus). Among the Mexican species, C. areolatus, C. patzcuarensis, and C. prolixus are considered seriously threatened by the IUCN, and C. alvarezi is already extinct. C. chihuahuae was also believed to be extinct until rediscovered in 2012. C. alvarezi and four undescribed, extinct Cambarellus species were restricted to desert spring systems in southwestern Nuevo León; each one shared its habitat with a Cyprinodon pupfish (these are also fully extinct or extinct in the wild).

An orange form of C. patzcuarensis is regularly seen in the freshwater aquarium trade.

== Species ==
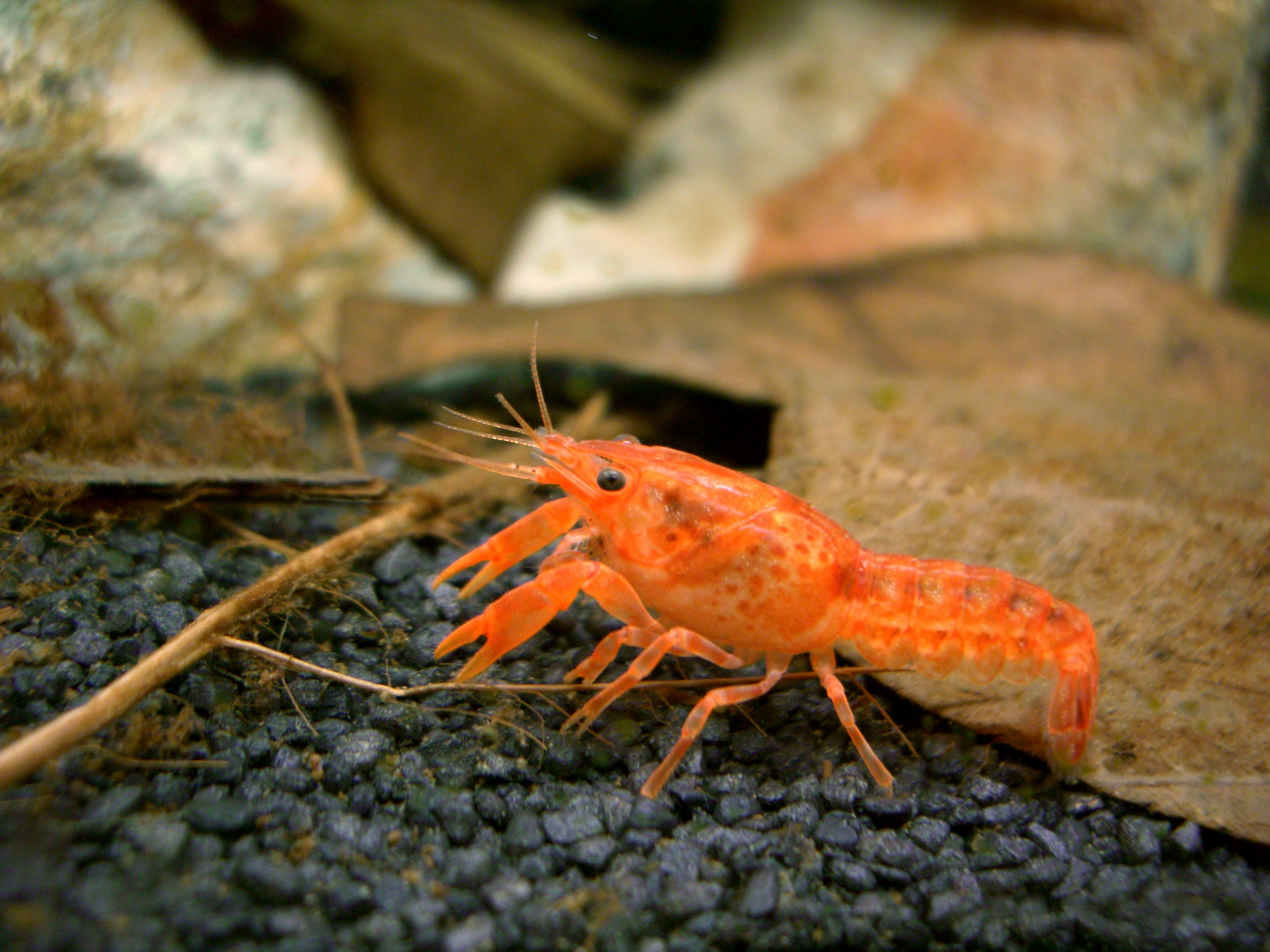
Cambarellus patzcuarensis var. "Orange" is common in the aquarium trade, but it is rare in the wild where the species typically is dull gray-brown

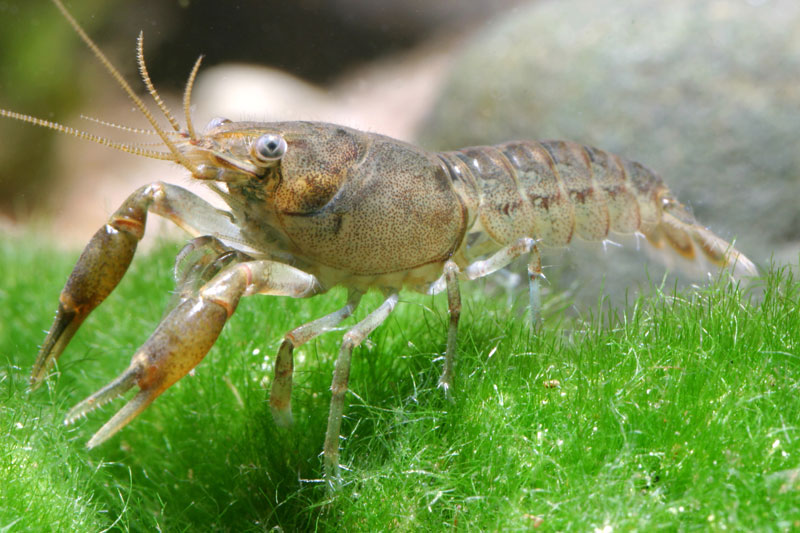
Cambarellus shufeldtii, a relatively widespread species from the United States

The genus contains the following species:

Subgenus Cambarellus (Cambarellus)

- †Cambarellus alvarezi (Villalobos, 1952)
- Cambarellus areolatus (Faxon, 1885)
- Cambarellus chapalanus (Faxon, 1898)
- †Cambarellus chihuahuae (Hobbs, 1980)
- Cambarellus montezumae (de Saussure, 1857)
- Cambarellus occidentalis (Faxon, 1898)
- Cambarellus patzcuarensis (Villalobos, 1943)
- Cambarellus prolixus (Villalobos-Figueroa & Hobbs, 1981)
- Cambarellus zacapuensis (Pedraza-Lara & Doadrio, 2015)
- Cambarellus zempoalensis (Villalobos, 1943)

Subgenus Pandicambarus

- Cambarellus blacki (Hobbs, 1980)
- Cambarellus diminutus (Hobbs, 1945)
- Cambarellus lesliei (Fitzpatrick & Laning, 1976)
- Cambarellus ninae (Hobbs, 1950)
- Cambarellus puer (Hobbs, 1945)
- Cambarellus rotatus (Schuster & Kendrick, 2017)
- Cambarus schmitti (Hobbs, 1942)
- Cambarellus shufeldtii (Faxon, 1884)
- Cambarellus texanus (Albaugh & Black, 1973)
