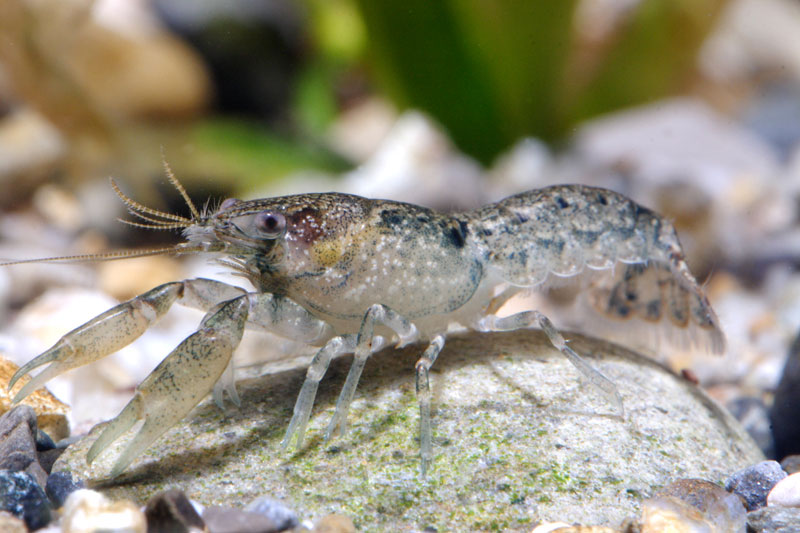

Conservation status
- Least Concern (IUCN 3.1)

- Vulnerable (NatureServe)

Scientific classification
- Kingdom: Animalia
- Phylum: Arthropoda
- Class: Malacostraca
- Order: Decapoda
- Suborder: Pleocyemata
- Family: Cambaridae
- Genus: Cambarellus
- Subgenus: Pandicambarus
- Species: C. lesliei

Binomial name
- Cambarellus lesliei (Fitzpatrick & Laning, 1976)

= Cambarellus lesliei =

Species of crayfish

Cambarellus lesliei is a species of crayfish in the family Cambaridae. It is native to Alabama and Mississippi in the United States. It is known commonly as the angular dwarf crawfish.

The main part of this species' distribution is Mobile Bay. It has been collected from the Alabama, Mobile, and Tombigbee Rivers. It lives in submerged vegetation in slow-moving and stagnant waterways.

This is listed as a least-concern species by the International Union for Conservation of Nature (IUCN). It is common in its range, and though it faces several threats, none are considered to be major. The crayfish is listed as a vulnerable species by NatureServe, because it has a limited range, a fragmented population, and threats to its survival that have likely led to declines in some subpopulations. Mobile Bay and its associated rivers host heavy shipping traffic and are affected by habitat disturbance and pollution.
