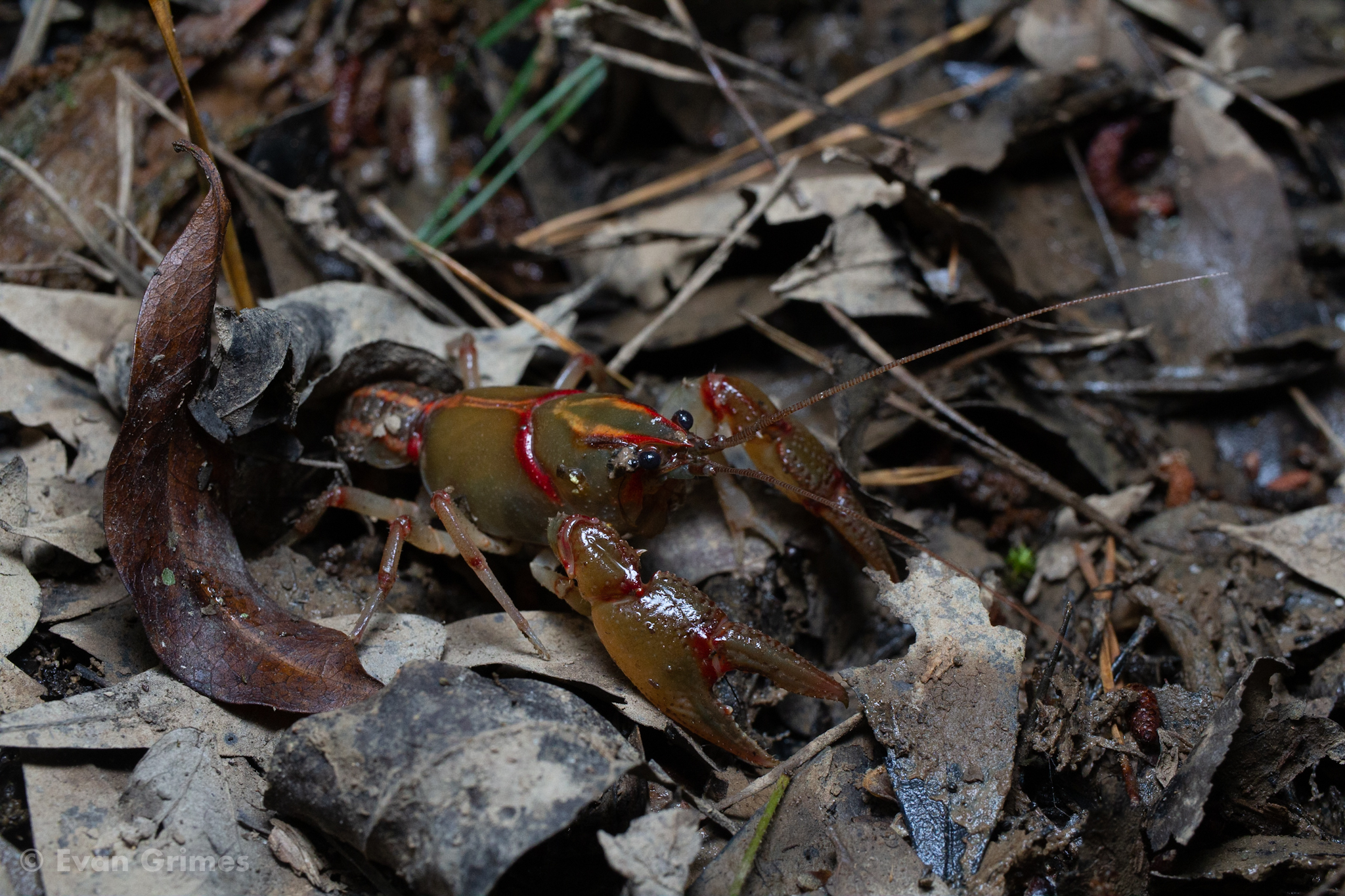
- Lacunicambarus ludovicianus, Painted Devil Crayfish, Mississippi

Scientific classification
- Kingdom: Animalia
- Phylum: Arthropoda
- Clade: Pancrustacea
- Class: Malacostraca
- Order: Decapoda
- Suborder: Pleocyemata
- Family: Cambaridae
- Genus: Lacunicambarus; Hobbs, 1969

= Lacunicambarus =

Genus of crustaceans

Lacunicambarus is a genus of burrowing crayfishes in the family Cambaridae. There are currently 12 described species in Lacunicambarus, all of which are found east of the Continental Divide in North America. The genus was first recognized in 2018 when it was discovered through genetic analyses that the Cambarus subgenera Lacunicambarus and Tubericambarus were not monophyletic on their own, but that when combined they formed a single monophyletic group distinct from Cambarus. A 2022 study used anchored hybrid enrichment to resolve the Lacunicambarus phylogeny, which elucidated interspecific relationships and highlighted remaining undescribed diversity within the genus.

== Species ==
Lacunicambarus contains the following 12 species, plus 2 currently undescribed species:

Lacunicambarus cladogram adapted from Glon et al. 2022.

- Lacunicambarus acanthura (Hobbs, 1981) (Thornytail Crayfish)
- Lacunicambarus chimera Glon & Thoma, 2019 (Crawzilla Crawdad)
- Lacunicambarus dalyae Glon, Williams & Loughman, 2019 (Jewel Mudbug)
- Lacunicambarus diogenes (Girard, 1852) (Devil Crayfish)
- Lacunicambarus erythrodactylus (Simon & Morris, 2014) (Warpaint Mudbug)
- Lacunicambarus freudensteini Glon, 2020 (Banded Mudbug)
- Lacunicambarus ludovicianus (Faxon, 1884) (Painted Devil Crayfish)
- Lacunicambarus miltus (Fitzpatrick, 1978) (Rusty Grave Digger)
- Lacunicambarus mobilensis Glon, 2020 (Lonesome Gravedigger)
- Lacunicambarus nebrascensis (Girard, 1852) (Great Plains Mudbug)
- Lacunicambarus polychromatus (Thoma, Jezerinac & Simon, 2005) (Paintedhand Mudbug)
- Lacunicambarus thomai (Jezerinac, 1993) (Little Brown Mudbug)

== Range ==
Map from Glon et al. 2022 showing range of Lacunicambarus species.

Lacunicambarus is one of the widest ranging crayfish genera in North America. Species from this genus can be found in nearly every state east of the Rocky Mountains and in the Province of Ontario. Some species in the genus, such as L. nebrascensis, are remarkably widespread while others, including L. miltus, L. freudensteini, and L. mobilensis have very small ranges.
