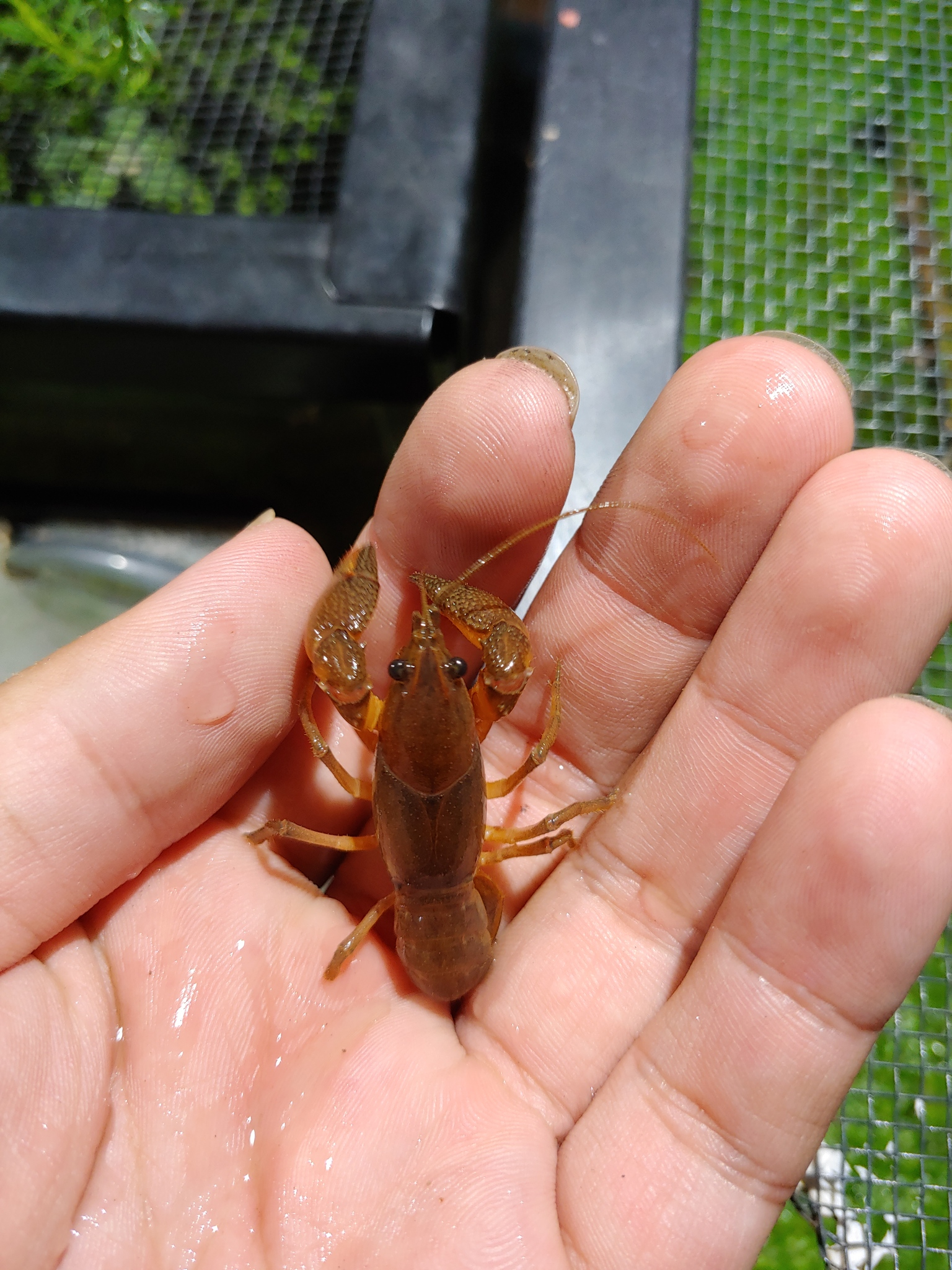
- Lacunicambarus acanthura, Thornytail Crayfish, Alabama

Conservation status
- Least Concern (IUCN 3.1)

- Apparently Secure (NatureServe)

Scientific classification
- Kingdom: Animalia
- Phylum: Arthropoda
- Class: Malacostraca
- Order: Decapoda
- Suborder: Pleocyemata
- Family: Cambaridae
- Genus: Lacunicambarus
- Species: L. acanthura

Binomial name
- Lacunicambarus acanthura (Hobbs, 1981)

Synonyms
- Cambarus acanthura

= Lacunicambarus acanthura =

Species of crayfish

Lacunicambarus acanthura, the thornytail crayfish, is a species of crayfish in the family Cambaridae. It is found in the southeastern United States.
