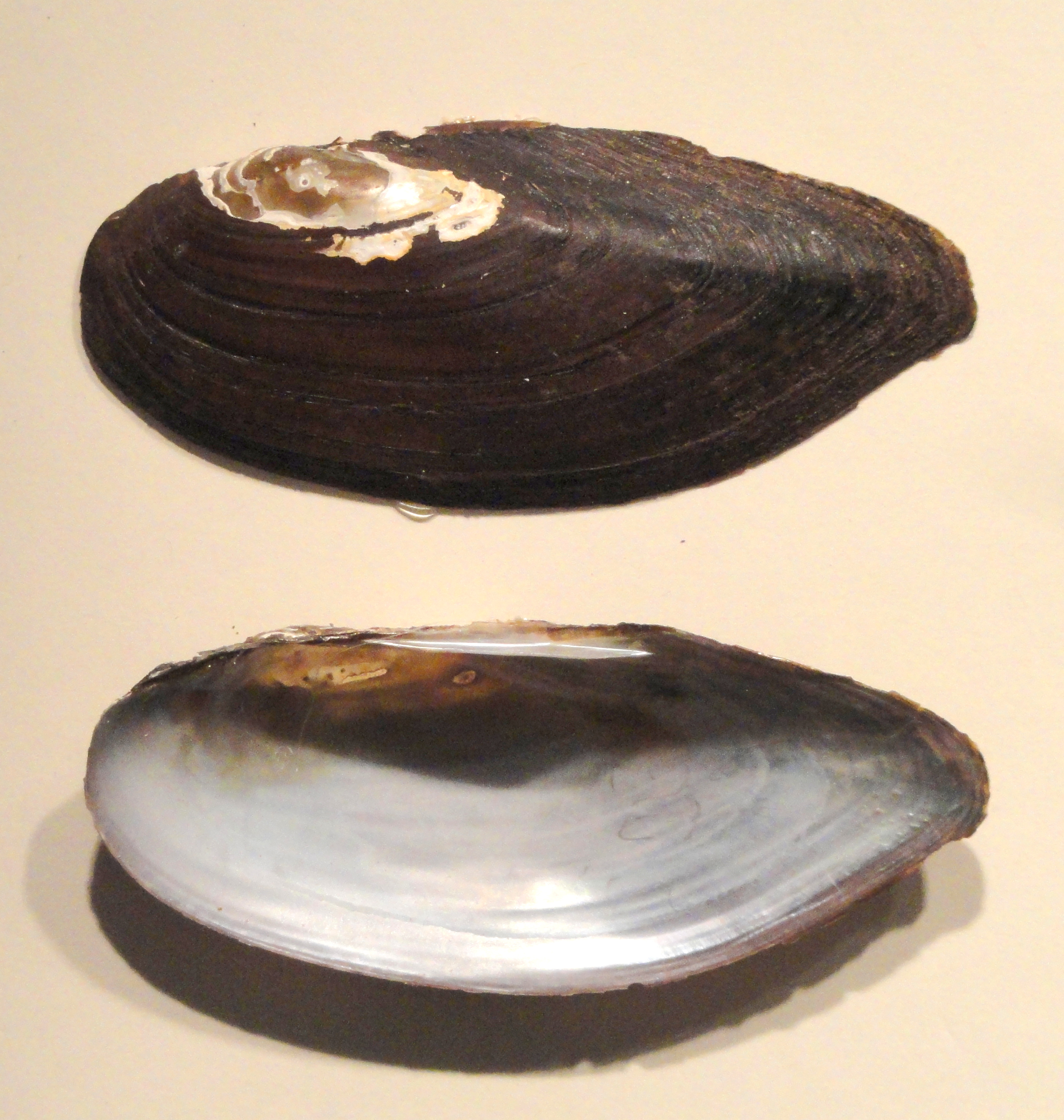
- Sagittunio nasutus

Scientific classification
- Kingdom: Animalia
- Phylum: Mollusca
- Class: Bivalvia
- Order: Unionida
- Family: Unionidae
- Subfamily: Ambleminae
- Tribe: Lampsilini
- Genus: Sagittunio; Watters, 2018

Type species
- Unio nasutus Say, 1817

= Sagittunio =

Genus of bivalves

Sagittunio is a genus of freshwater mussels, which are aquatic bivalve mollusks belonging to the family Unionidae.. Found in freshwater environments such as rivers, streams, lakes, and ponds. The species of this genus are endemic to North America.

== Species ==
There are four recognized species:

- Sagittunio aldermani Watters, 2018
- Sagittunio nasutus (Say, 1817)
- Sagittunio subrostratus (Say, 1831)
- Sagittunio vaughanianus (Lea I., 1838)
