= Cambarellus chihuahuae =

Conservation status
- Extinct (No) (IUCN 3.1)

Scientific classification
- Kingdom: Animalia
- Phylum: Arthropoda
- Clade: Pancrustacea
- Class: Malacostraca
- Order: Decapoda
- Suborder: Pleocyemata
- Family: Cambaridae
- Genus: Cambarellus
- Species: †C. chihuahuae

Binomial name
- †Cambarellus chihuahuae Hobbs, 1980

Species of crayfish

Cambarellus chihuahuae, the Chihuahua dwarf crayfish, is a small, freshwater crayfish endemic to Chihuahua in Mexico. It is known from only one spring, Ojo de Carbonera, 4.3 km (2.7 mi) south of Ejido Rancho Nuevo. It shares this habitat with the co-endemic Cyprinodon fontinalis and Cyprinella bocagrande

Regular surveys are carried out of the spring site to observe the three endangered species, and when a 2009 survey found most springs dry, and the only one with water to contain no crayfish, it was considered as being extinct in 2010. Further surveys, looking for fish, led to its rediscovery in September 2012.
