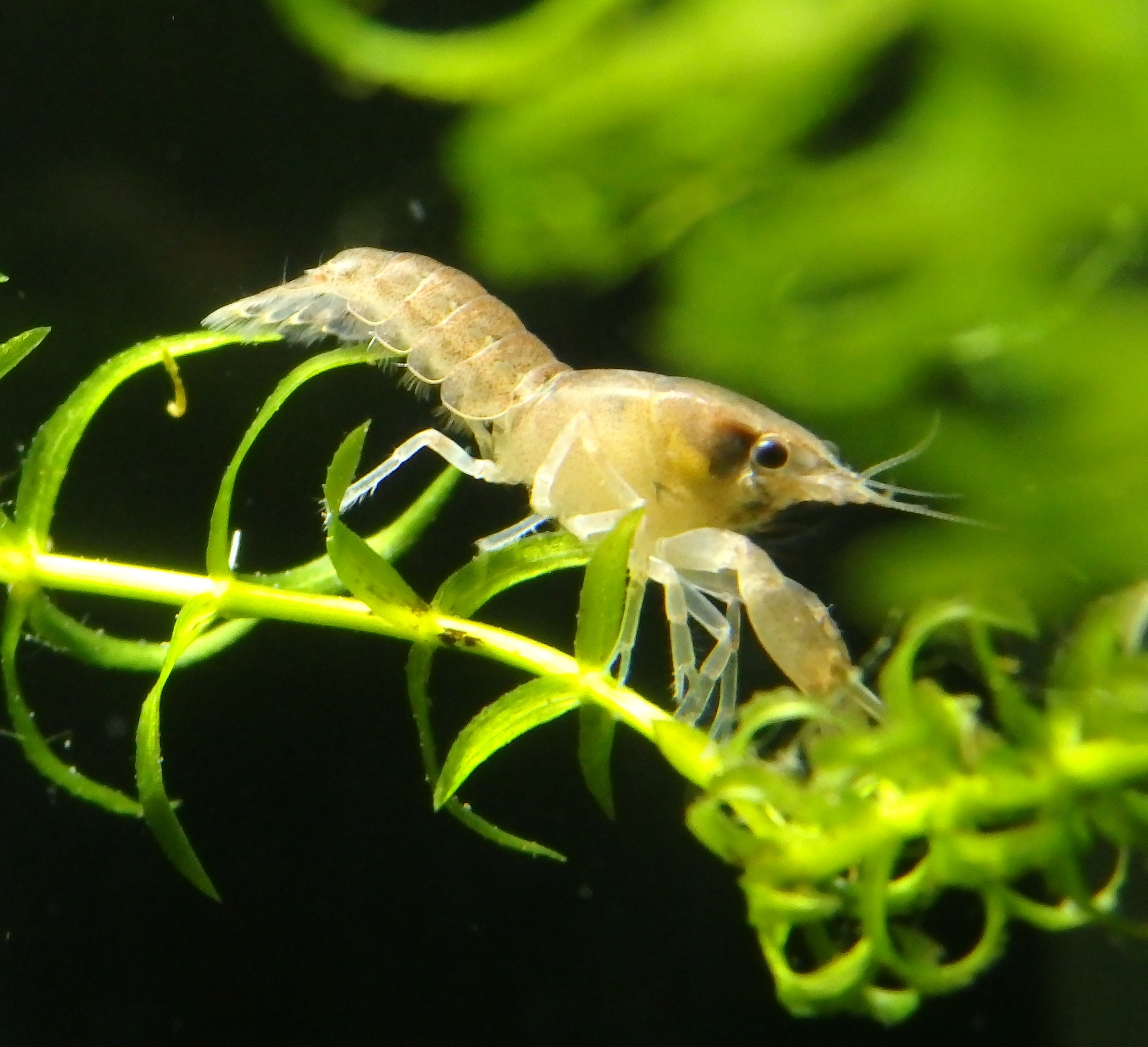

Conservation status
- Data Deficient (IUCN 3.1)

- Vulnerable (NatureServe)

Scientific classification
- Kingdom: Animalia
- Phylum: Arthropoda
- Class: Malacostraca
- Order: Decapoda
- Suborder: Pleocyemata
- Family: Cambaridae
- Genus: Cambarellus
- Subgenus: Pandicambarus
- Species: C. diminutus

Binomial name
- Cambarellus diminutus (Hobbs, 1945)

= Cambarellus diminutus =

Species of crayfish

Cambarellus diminutus is a species of crayfish in the family Cambaridae. It is endemic to the United States. It is native to Mississippi and Alabama, and is listed as Data Deficient on the IUCN Red List.

The Cambarellus diminutus, known as the Least Dwarf Crayfish, is in the subgenus Pandicambarus of the genus Cambarellus, this animal is typically 1–2 cm in size and an omnivore that typically feeds on anything but should be fed a diet of sinking pellet. The Least Dwarf Crayfish is a freshwater animal that can be found from Mississippi, Alabama, and southern Illinois and adaptable to slight changes in water condition, and capable of year-round breeding
