= Carbonera pupfish =

Perrito de carbonera

Conservation status
- Endangered (IUCN 3.1)

Scientific classification
- Kingdom: Animalia
- Phylum: Chordata
- Class: Actinopterygii
- Division: Teleostei
- Order: Cyprinodontiformes
- Family: Cyprinodontidae
- Genus: Cyprinodon
- Species: C. fontinalis

Binomial name
- Cyprinodon fontinalis M. L. Smith & R. R. Miller, 1980

Species of fish

The Carbonera pupfish (Cyprinodon fontinalis), also known as the Perrito de carbonera, is a small, endangered species of pupfish in the family Cyprinodontidae. It is endemic to springs and associated waters at Bolsón de los Muertos in northwestern Chihuahua, Mexico. It was last rated by the IUCN in 1996 when it was assessed as endangered, but most subpopulations now appear to be extirpated, while a few are extinct in the wild (still survive in captivity). In 2012, it only survived in the wild in a single spring (having once occurred in nine), which also was the last remaining habitat for the largemouth shiner (Cyprinella bocagrande) and the dwarf crayfish Cambarellus chihuahuae. As this single spring was declining, it was decided to move some individuals of all three species to a nearby refuge in 2014 as a safeguard.
