= Largemouth shiner =

Conservation status
- Critically Endangered (IUCN 3.1)

Scientific classification
- Kingdom: Animalia
- Phylum: Chordata
- Class: Actinopterygii
- Order: Cypriniformes
- Family: Leuciscidae
- Subfamily: Pogonichthyinae
- Genus: Cyprinella
- Species: C. bocagrande

Binomial name
- Cyprinella bocagrande (Chernoff & R. R. Miller, 1982)

Synonyms
- Notropis bocagrande Chernoff & Miller, 1982

Species of fish

The largemouth shiner (Cyprinella bocagrande) is a critically endangered freshwater ray-finned fish in the family Leuciscidae, the shiners, daces and minnows. It is found only in the Guzmán Basin in northwestern Chihuahua, Mexico, where it is called sardinita bocagrande. In 2012, it only survived in a single spring, which also was the last remaining habitat for the Carbonera pupfish (Cyprinodon fontinalis) and the dwarf crayfish Cambarellus chihuahuae. As this single spring was declining, it was decided to move some individuals of all three species to a nearby refuge in 2014 as a safeguard. The largemouth shiner grows to a standard length of 4.1 cm (1.6 in).
