= Cambarellus blacki =

Conservation status
- Data Deficient (IUCN 3.1)

- Critically Imperiled (NatureServe)

Scientific classification
- Kingdom: Animalia
- Phylum: Arthropoda
- Class: Malacostraca
- Order: Decapoda
- Suborder: Pleocyemata
- Family: Cambaridae
- Genus: Cambarellus
- Subgenus: Pandicambarus
- Species: C. blacki

Binomial name
- Cambarellus blacki (Hobbs, 1980)

Species of crayfish

Cambarellus blacki, the cypress crayfish, is a species of crayfish in family Cambaridae. It is endemic to Florida.
