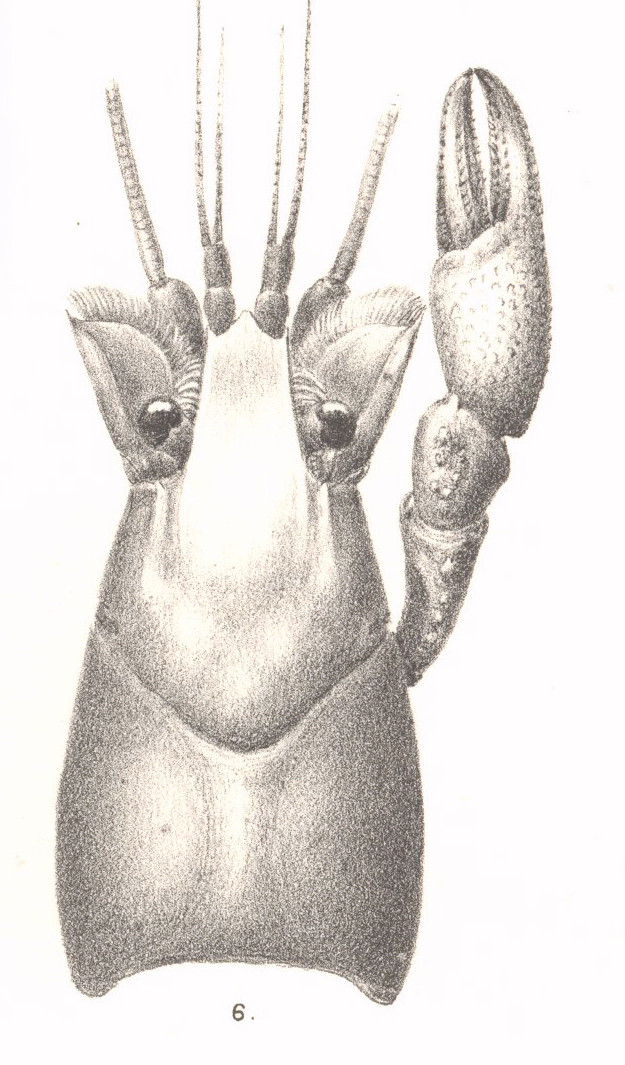

Conservation status
- Least Concern (IUCN 3.1)

Scientific classification
- Kingdom: Animalia
- Phylum: Arthropoda
- Class: Malacostraca
- Order: Decapoda
- Suborder: Pleocyemata
- Family: Cambaridae
- Genus: Cambarellus
- Subgenus: Cambarellus
- Species: C. montezumae

Binomial name
- Cambarellus montezumae (Saussure, 1857)

Synonyms
- Cambarellus montezumae (de Saussure, 1857); Cambarellus montezumae f. lermensis A. Villalobos, 1943; Cambarus montezumae de Saussure, 1857; Cambarus Montezumae dugesii Faxon, 1898; Cambarus Montezumae var. tridens von Martens, 1872

= Acocil =

Species of crayfish

The acocil (Cambarellus montezumae) is a species of crayfish in the family Cambaridae. It is endemic to Mexico, where it is known from Jalisco and Puebla.

The name acocil comes from the Nahuatl cuitzilli, meaning "crooked one of the water" or "squirms in the water". It is a traditional foodstuff of the Pre-Columbian Mexicans, who boiled or baked the animal, and ate it in tacos.

This is a common species in its range, becoming abundant in some areas. It can be found in a number of aquatic habitat types, including artificial habitats such as canals. It is found in areas with aquatic vegetation, and it often buries itself among the roots. It can tolerate a relatively wide range of temperatures, pH, and oxygen concentrations.

It is considered to be a least-concern species by the International Union for Conservation of Nature (IUCN) because it is adaptable, its populations are stable, and it faces no major threats. Minor threats include the introduction of common carp (Cyprinus carpio) into the area. The acocil is still a subsistence food source for local people.
