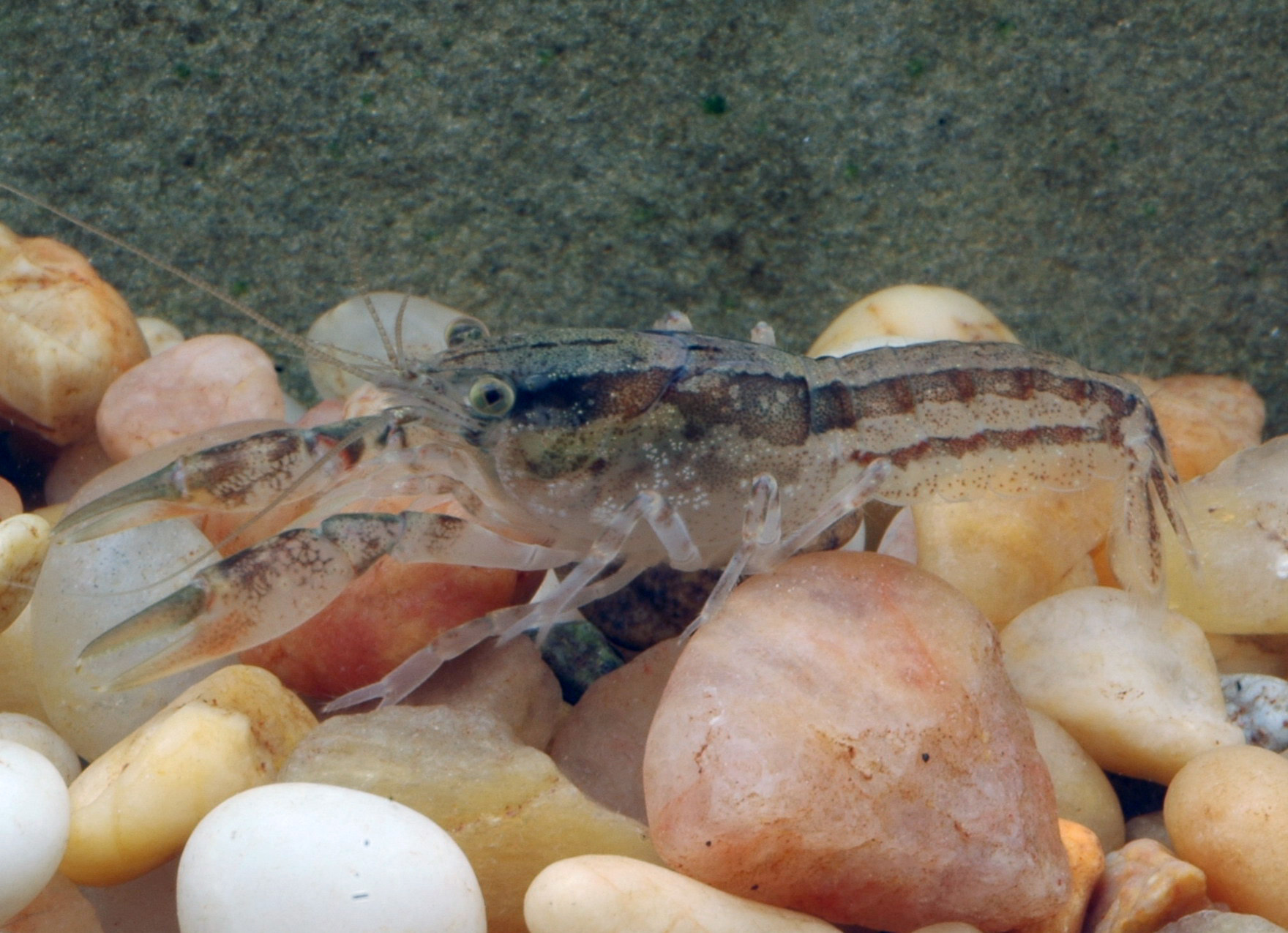

Conservation status
- Least Concern (IUCN 3.1)

- Secure (NatureServe)

Scientific classification
- Kingdom: Animalia
- Phylum: Arthropoda
- Class: Malacostraca
- Order: Decapoda
- Suborder: Pleocyemata
- Family: Cambaridae
- Genus: Cambarellus
- Subgenus: Pandicambarus
- Species: C. puer

Binomial name
- Cambarellus puer (Hobbs, 1941)

= Cambarellus puer =

Species of crayfish

Cambarellus puer is a species of crayfish in the family Cambaridae. It is known commonly as the swamp dwarf crayfish. It is native to the United States, where it can be found in Oklahoma, Texas, Louisiana, Illinois, Arkansas, Mississippi, Tennessee, and Kentucky.

This crayfish lives in a variety of habitat types, including artificial habitats such as roadside ditches. It is generally found with aquatic vegetation, and it burrows into the substrate during dry periods.

It is listed as a least-concern species by the International Union for Conservation of Nature (IUCN), because it is "secure, widespread and abundant".
