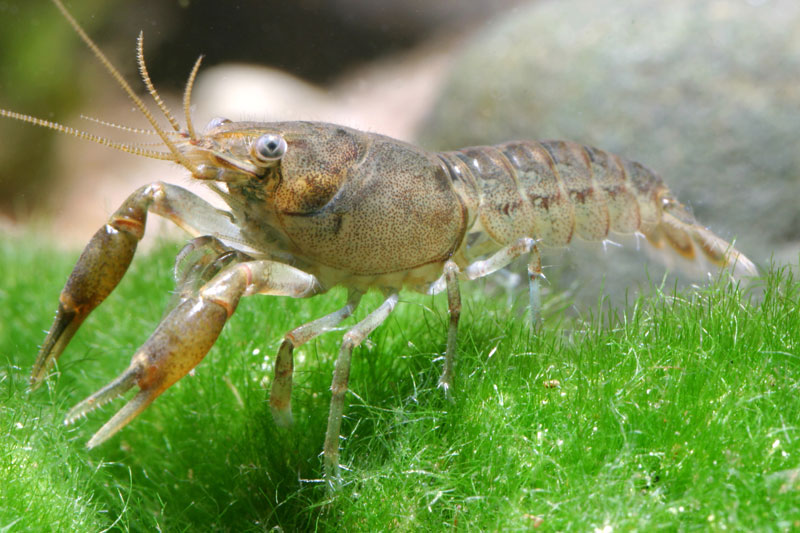

Conservation status
- Least Concern (IUCN 3.1)

- Secure (NatureServe)

Scientific classification
- Kingdom: Animalia
- Phylum: Arthropoda
- Class: Malacostraca
- Order: Decapoda
- Suborder: Pleocyemata
- Family: Cambaridae
- Genus: Cambarellus
- Subgenus: Pandicambarus
- Species: C. shufeldtii

Binomial name
- Cambarellus shufeldtii Faxon, 1884

= Cambarellus shufeldtii =

Species of crayfish

Cambarellus shufeldtii is a species of crayfish in the family Cambaridae. It is native to the United States, where it occurs in Alabama, Arkansas, Illinois, Kentucky, Louisiana, Mississippi, Missouri, Tennessee, and Texas. It is present in Georgia as an introduced species. It is known commonly as the Cajun dwarf crayfish.

This crayfish lives in a variety of aquatic habitat types, especially slow-moving and standing water. It lives in shallow water with plant cover, and it burrows into the substrate during dry periods. This species is aggressive and will enter conflict with other crayfish species.
