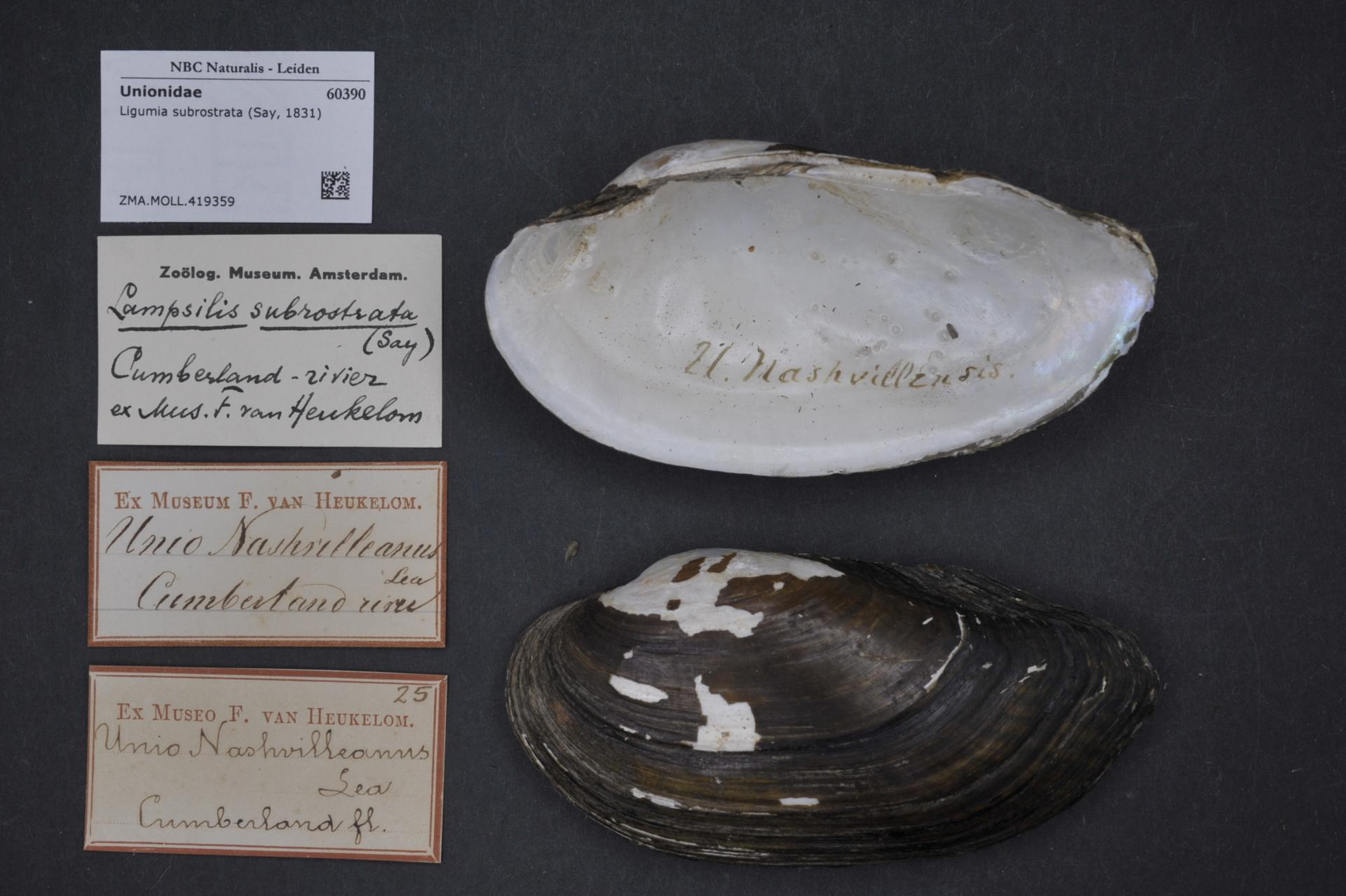

Conservation status
- Secure (NatureServe)

Scientific classification
- Domain: Eukaryota
- Kingdom: Animalia
- Phylum: Mollusca
- Class: Bivalvia
- Order: Unionida
- Family: Unionidae
- Subfamily: Ambleminae
- Tribe: Lampsilini
- Genus: Sagittunio
- Species: S. subrostratus

Binomial name
- Sagittunio subrostratus (Say, 1831)

Synonyms
- Eurynia subrostrata (Say, 1831); Lampsilis (Eurynia) subrostrata (Say, 1831); Lampsilis (Eurynia) subrostrata furva Simpson, 1914; Lampsilis (Eurynia) subrostratus (Say, 1831); Lampsilis (Ligumia) subrostrata (Say, 1831); Lampsilis (Ligumia) subrostrata furva Simpson, 1914; Lampsilis subrostrata (Say, 1831); Lampsilis subrostrata var. furva Simpson, 1914 (synonym); Ligumia subrostrata (Say, 1831); Margarita (Unio) nashvillianus (I. Lea, 1834); Margaron (Unio) mississippiensis (Conrad, 1850); Margaron (Unio) nashvillianus (I. Lea, 1834); Margaron (Unio) rutersvillensis (I. Lea, 1859); Margaron (Unio) topekaensis (I. Lea, 1868); Margaron nashvilliensis "I. Lea, 1870" (incorrect subsequent spelling, erroneously treated as an emendation); Unio cocoduensis Reeve, 1865; Unio mississippiensis Conrad, 1850; Unio nashvillianus I. Lea, 1834; Unio rutersvillensis I. Lea, 1859; Unio subrostratus Say, 1831 (original combination); Unio topekaensis I. Lea, 1868

= Sagittunio subrostratus =

Species of bivalve

Sagittunio subrostratus, commonly referred to as the pondmussel or black pondmussel, is a species of freshwater mussel, an aquatic bivalve in the family Unionidae, the river mussels.
