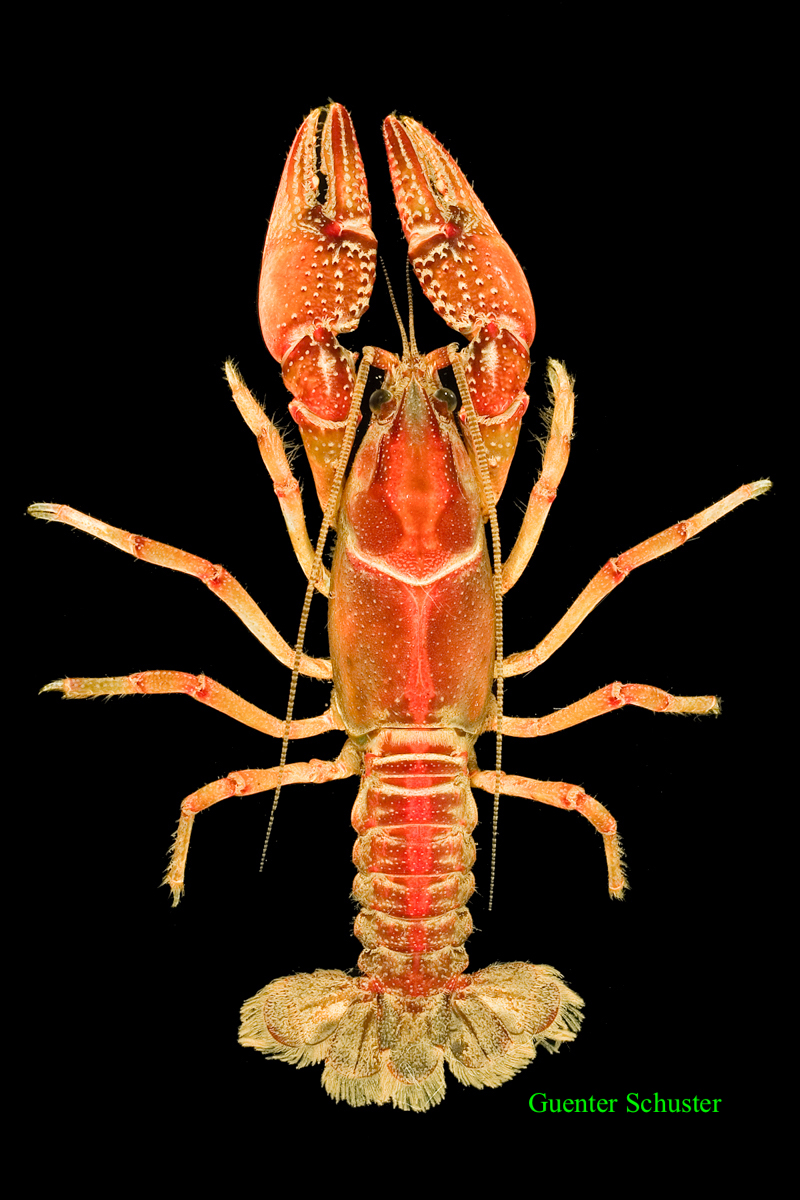
- Rusty gravedigger, Lacunicambarus miltus

Conservation status
- Least Concern (IUCN 3.1)

- Vulnerable (NatureServe)

Scientific classification
- Kingdom: Animalia
- Phylum: Arthropoda
- Class: Malacostraca
- Order: Decapoda
- Suborder: Pleocyemata
- Family: Cambaridae
- Genus: Lacunicambarus
- Species: L. miltus

Binomial name
- Lacunicambarus miltus (Fitzpatrick, 1978)

Synonyms
- Cambarus miltus

= Lacunicambarus miltus =

Rusty gravedigger

Species of crayfish

Lacunicambarus miltus, the rusty gravedigger, is a species of crayfish in the family Cambaridae. It is found in the southeastern United States.
