= Lacunicambarus polychromatus =

Scientific classification
- Kingdom: Animalia
- Phylum: Arthropoda
- Clade: Pancrustacea
- Class: Malacostraca
- Order: Decapoda
- Suborder: Pleocyemata
- Family: Cambaridae
- Genus: Lacunicambarus
- Species: L. polychromatus

Binomial name
- Lacunicambarus polychromatus (Thoma, Jezerinac & Simon, 2005)

Species of crustaceans

Lacunicambarus polychromatus, commonly known as the paintedhand mudbug, is a species of burrowing crayfishes in the family Cambaridae.

== Description ==
Lacunicambarus polychromatus is a large, often light brown to green-brown, crawfish. The edges of its tail, head, abdominal segments, and pincers are red, and there are red spots on the pincers.

== Range ==
Lacunicambarus polychromatus is most commonly found in North America at the southern ends of Michigan, Indiana, Ohio, Kentucky, Tennessee, Alabama, northern Florida, Illinois, and southern Ontario.

== Habitat ==
Lacunicambarus polychromatus lives in muddy lowlands, and is a burrowing species.
