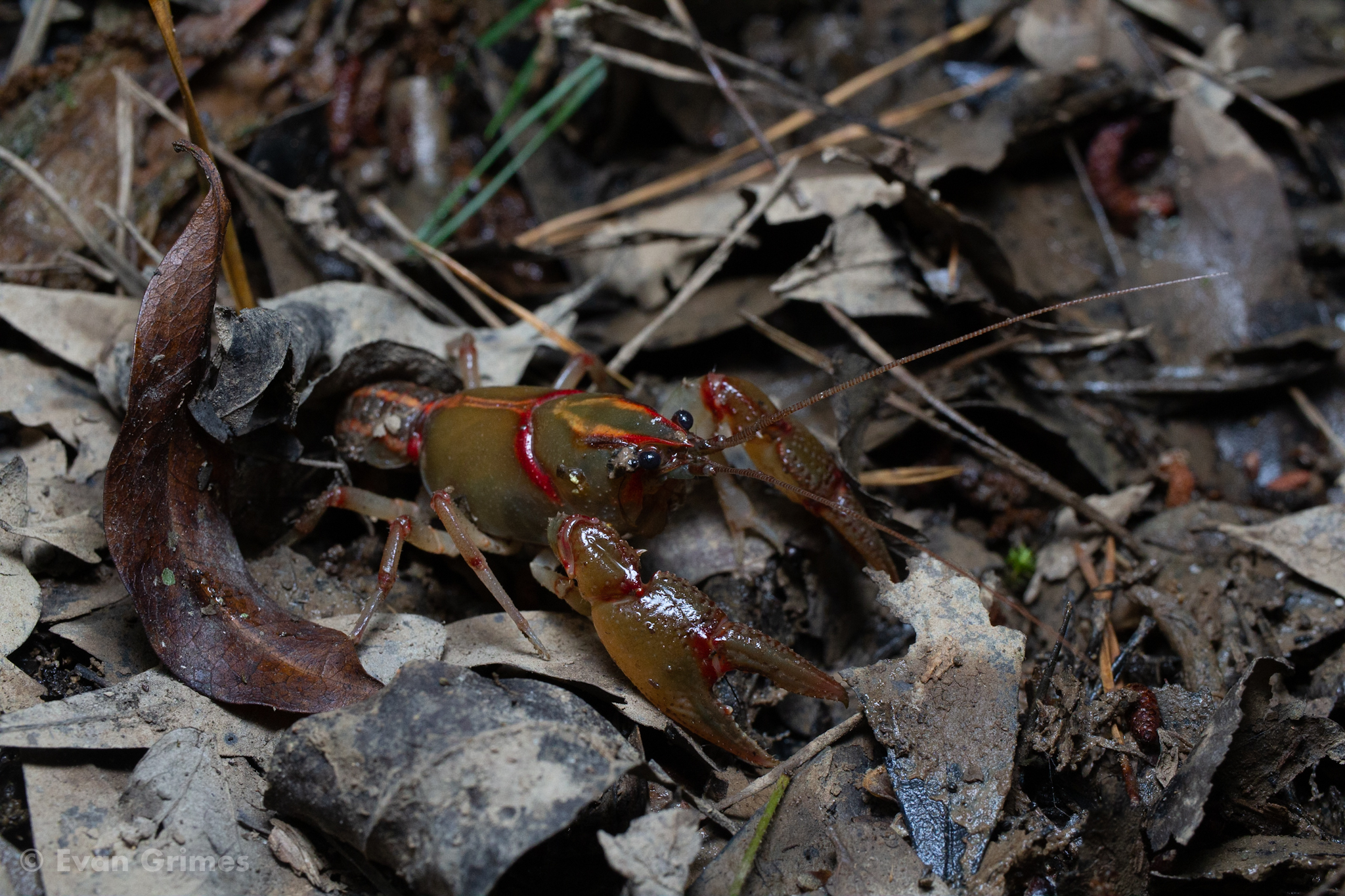
- Lacunicambarus ludovicianus, Mississippi

Conservation status
- Least Concern (IUCN 3.1)

- Secure (NatureServe)

Scientific classification
- Kingdom: Animalia
- Phylum: Arthropoda
- Class: Malacostraca
- Order: Decapoda
- Suborder: Pleocyemata
- Family: Cambaridae
- Genus: Lacunicambarus
- Species: L. ludovicianus

Binomial name
- Lacunicambarus ludovicianus Faxon, 1884

Synonyms
- Cambarus ludovicianus; Cambarus diogenes var. ludoviciana

= Lacunicambarus ludovicianus =

Painted devil crayfish

Species of crayfish

Lacunicambarus ludovicianus, the painted devil crayfish, is a species of North American burrowing crayfish found in the Lower Mississippi drainage and in eastern and central Texas, Alabama, Kentucky, Missouri, and Oklahoma.
