= Lacunicambarus diogenes =

Devil crayfish
- Devil crayfish, Lacunicambarus diogenes, neotype

Conservation status
- Least Concern (IUCN 3.1)

- Secure (NatureServe)

Scientific classification
- Kingdom: Animalia
- Phylum: Arthropoda
- Clade: Pancrustacea
- Class: Malacostraca
- Order: Decapoda
- Suborder: Pleocyemata
- Family: Cambaridae
- Genus: Lacunicambarus
- Species: L. diogenes

Binomial name
- Lacunicambarus diogenes (Girard, 1852)

Synonyms
- Cambarus diogenes; Astacus fossor Rafinesque, 1817; Cambarus nebrascensis; Cambarus obesus Hagen, 1870

Species of crayfish

Lacunicambarus diogenes, the devil crayfish or devil crawfish, is a species of North American burrowing crayfish found in the Atlantic Coastal Plain and parts of the Piedmont ecoregion from New Jersey, Pennsylvania, Delaware, Maryland, Virginia, North Carolina, South Carolina, Louisiana, and Georgia.
