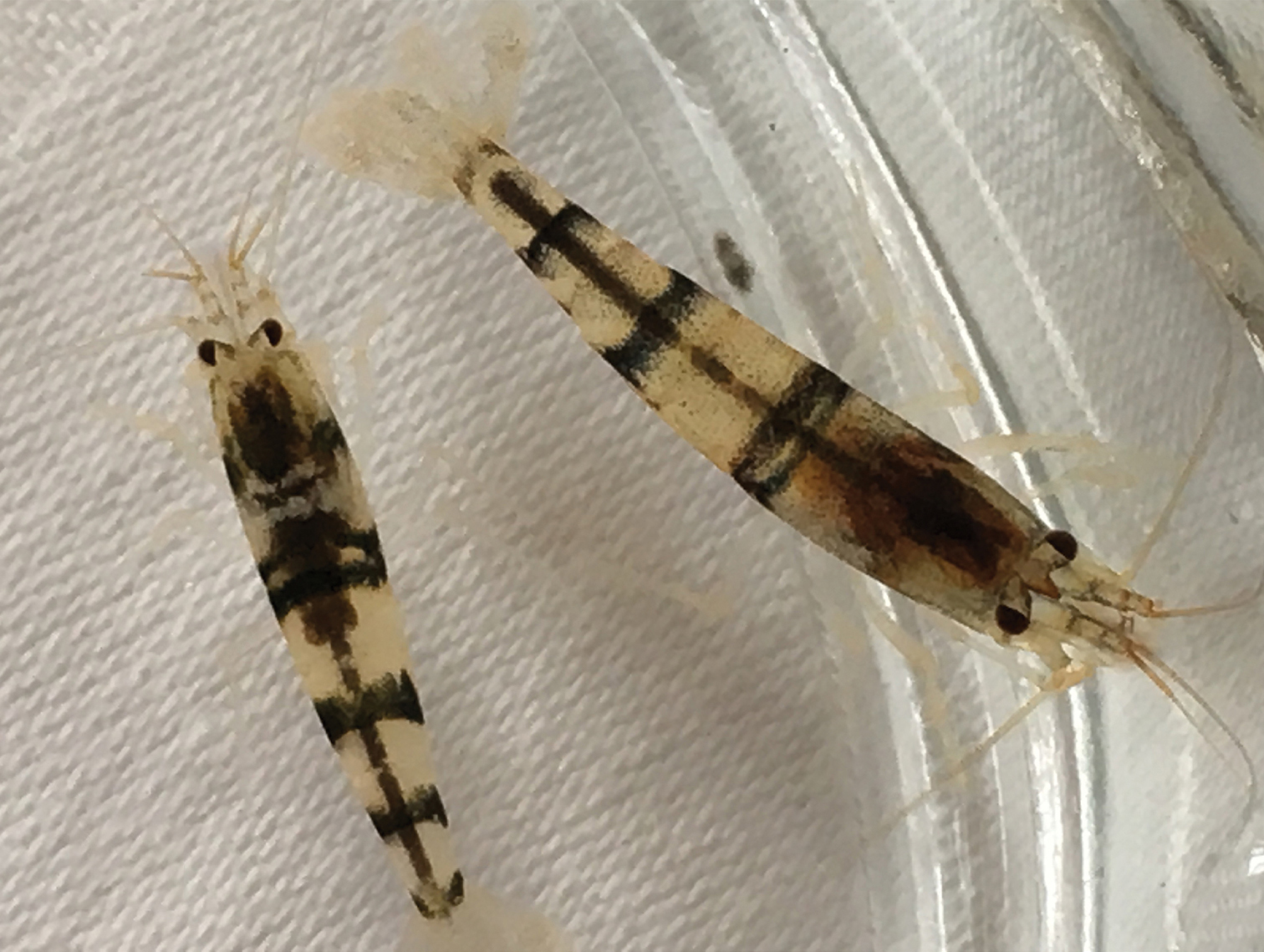

Scientific classification
- Domain: Eukaryota
- Kingdom: Animalia
- Phylum: Arthropoda
- Class: Malacostraca
- Order: Decapoda
- Suborder: Pleocyemata
- Infraorder: Caridea
- Family: Atyidae
- Genus: Caridina
- Species: C. tetrazona

Binomial name
- Caridina tetrazona Chen, Chen, & Guo, 2020

= Caridina tetrazona =

Species of crustacean

Caridina tetrazona is a species of freshwater shrimp native to the Wanshan islands in Guangdong Province, southern China. It was described from specimens collected on Dawanshan Island, where it is found alongside Caridina serrata. The name 'tetrazona' refers to the four banded color patter found in this species.

== Taxonomy ==
A phylogenetic analysis conducted by Chen, Chen, and Guo (2020) found Caridina Tetrazona to be sister to C. serrata, with both of these species closely related to C. trifasciata. The tree below is summarized from their analysis:

- - - - C. cantonensis
      - C. mariae
    - - - C. serrata
        - C. tetrazona
      - C. trifasciata
  - - C. lanceifrons
    - C. zhujiangensis
- C. huananensis
