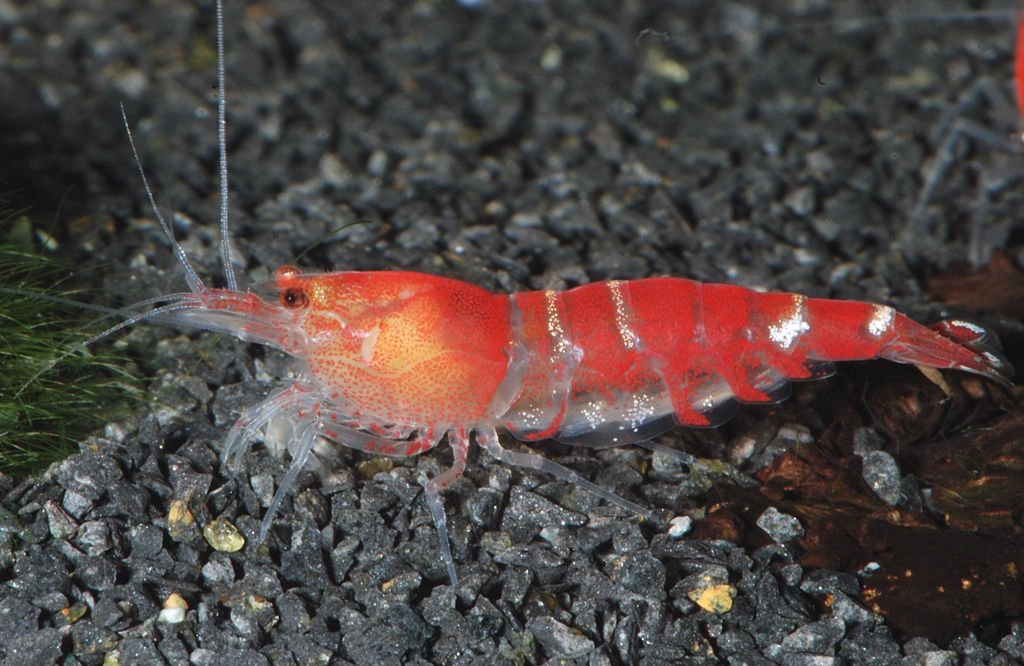

Conservation status
- Least Concern (IUCN 3.1)

Scientific classification
- Kingdom: Animalia
- Phylum: Arthropoda
- Clade: Pancrustacea
- Class: Malacostraca
- Order: Decapoda
- Suborder: Pleocyemata
- Infraorder: Caridea
- Family: Atyidae
- Genus: Caridina
- Species: C. cantonensis

Binomial name
- Caridina cantonensis Yü, 1938

= Caridina cantonensis =

Species of crustacean

Caridina cantonensis, the bee shrimp, is a species of small freshwater shrimp in the family Atyidae. It is native to China, Hong Kong and possibly Vietnam. These shrimp are scavengers, and eat small pieces of decayed vegetation and algae. Bee shrimp have a life span of about 18 months. They enjoy a temperature in the 70 to 78 °F (21 to 26 °C) range. Many modern versions of bee shrimp are selectively bred for their characteristics.

Bee shrimp are in demand as aquarium pets. In Taiwan and other areas with suitable climates shrimp farms have sprung up to supply Bee shrimp, although they are more difficult to farm than other shrimp because their health depends on being raised in soft water that matches the pH of their native streams.

== Variations ==
There are many variants of the bee shrimp:

- The black bee shrimp, sometimes called the Crystal Bee, is the most common variety. Some of the other varieties have been developed from it through selective breeding.
- The blue bee shrimp is a wild shrimp that is being harvested from streams in China to supply aquarium owners.
- The golden bee shrimp has a white shell and orangy gold flesh.
- The crystal red shrimp (called "red bee shrimp" in Japan) is a red and white variety specially bred for the aquarium hobby industry. In 1996 Hisayasu Suzuki of Japan discovered among his population of Black Bee shrimp a red one; and later two more. By selectively breeding these, over time he and other shrimp breeders obtained shrimp with intense red and white stripes with various patterns, but with little genetic diversity.

Shrimp breeders have given colourful names to the many other variants of the bee shrimp, which include the Princess Bee, Blue Bolt, Tangerine Tiger and Shadow Panda.

== Reproduction ==
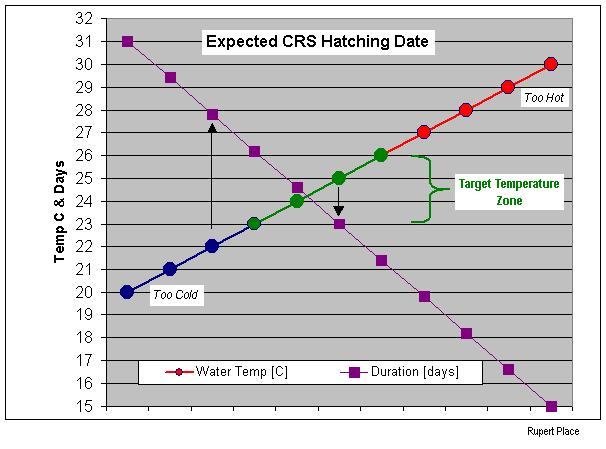
Expected CRS Hatching Date

Female Caridina cantonensis can be distinguished from males by size; the female is larger than the male, and has a deeper abdomen. The female shrimp signal readiness to mate by releasing pheromones into the water which lead the males to the female. During this time swimming activity can be quite vigorous as males search for the females.

The eggs are carried underneath the female's abdomen and uses the pleopods to maintain a continuous circulation of water. The eggs hatch to reveal tiny versions of the adult shrimp.

The duration the female carries the eggs before they hatch is linked to water temperature. At 22 °C (72 °F) the expected hatching time is 28 days. At 24 to 25 °C (75 to 77 °F) the shrimp develop the strongest colours.

Extended high water temperatures result in higher juvenile and adult mortality, and less egg survivability. Warmer water will bring invertebrates to sexual maturity earlier but with a smaller body size than cold water. A cold water environment will slow down invertebrate sexual maturity; consequently the shrimp have longer to grow, have a larger body size at sexual maturity than if they had been brought up in warmer water.

== Taxonomy ==
A phylogenetic analysis conducted by Chen, Chen, and Guo (2020) found Caridina cantonensis to be sister to C. mariae. The tree below is summarized from their analysis:

- - - - C. cantonensis
      - C. mariae
    - - - C. serrata
        - C. tetrazona
      - C. trifasciata
  - - C. lanceifrons
    - C. zhujiangensis
- C. huananensis

== Gallery ==
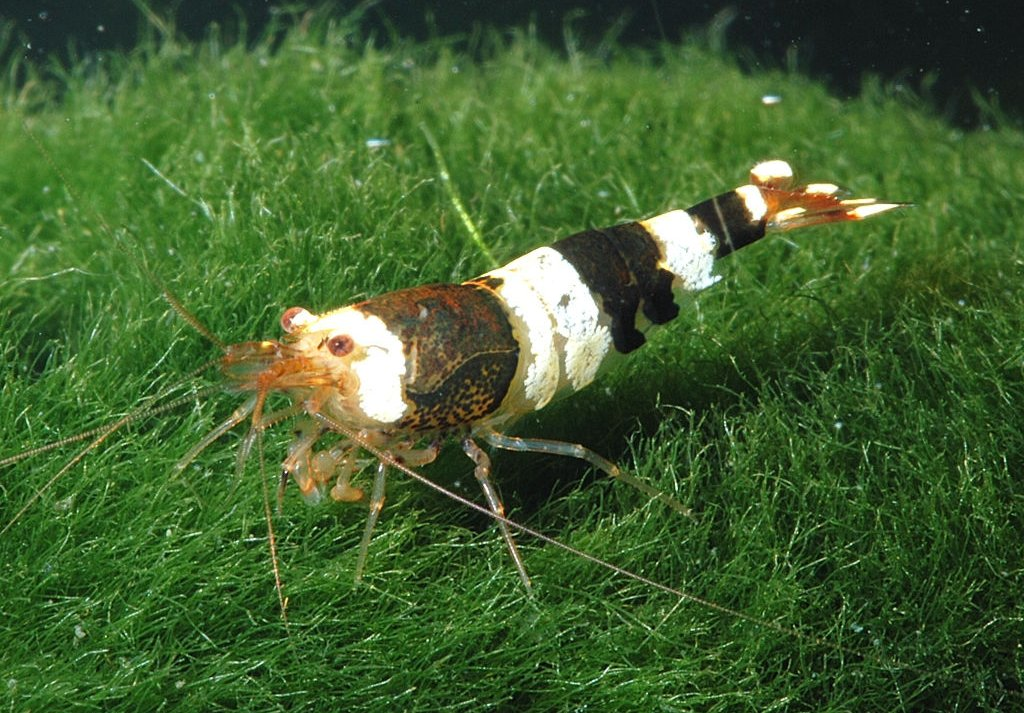
Black bee pattern

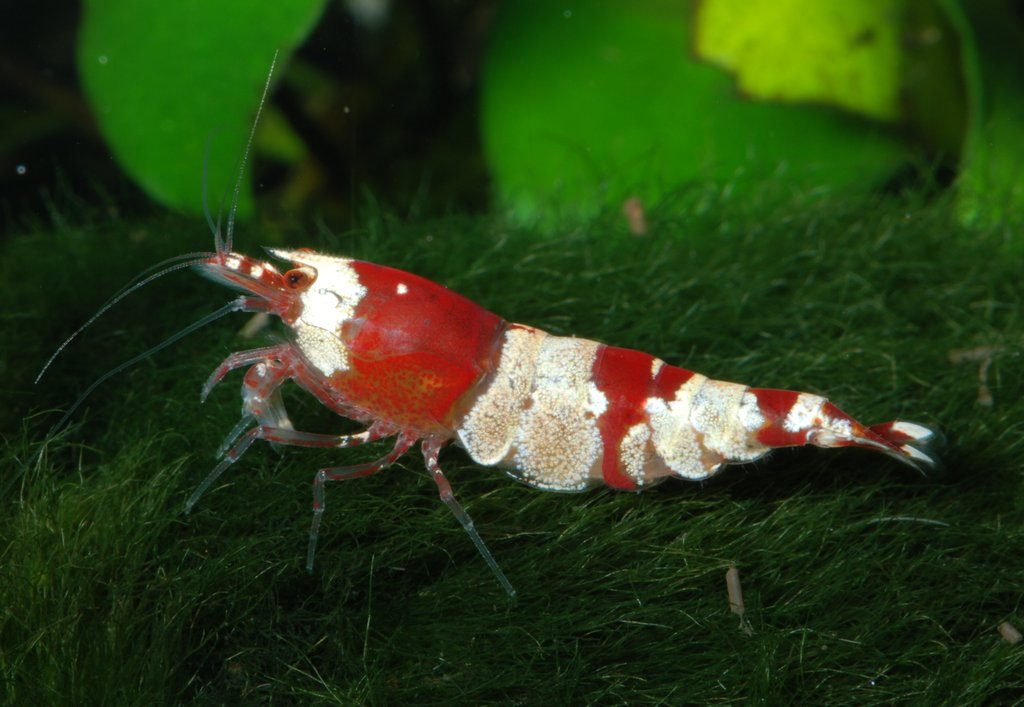
Red bee pattern

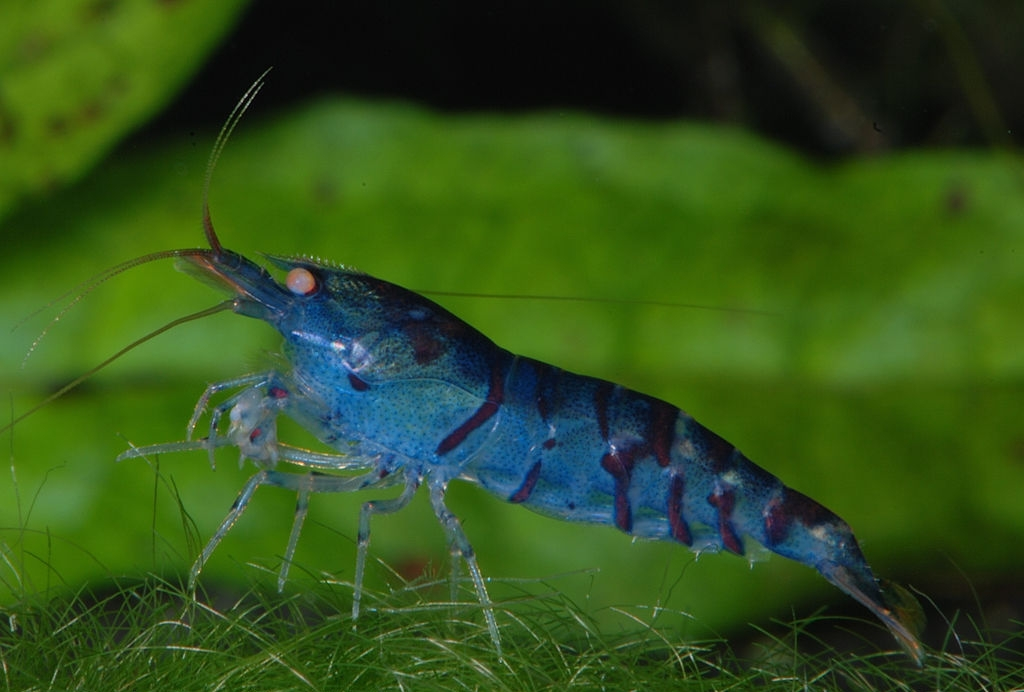
Blue

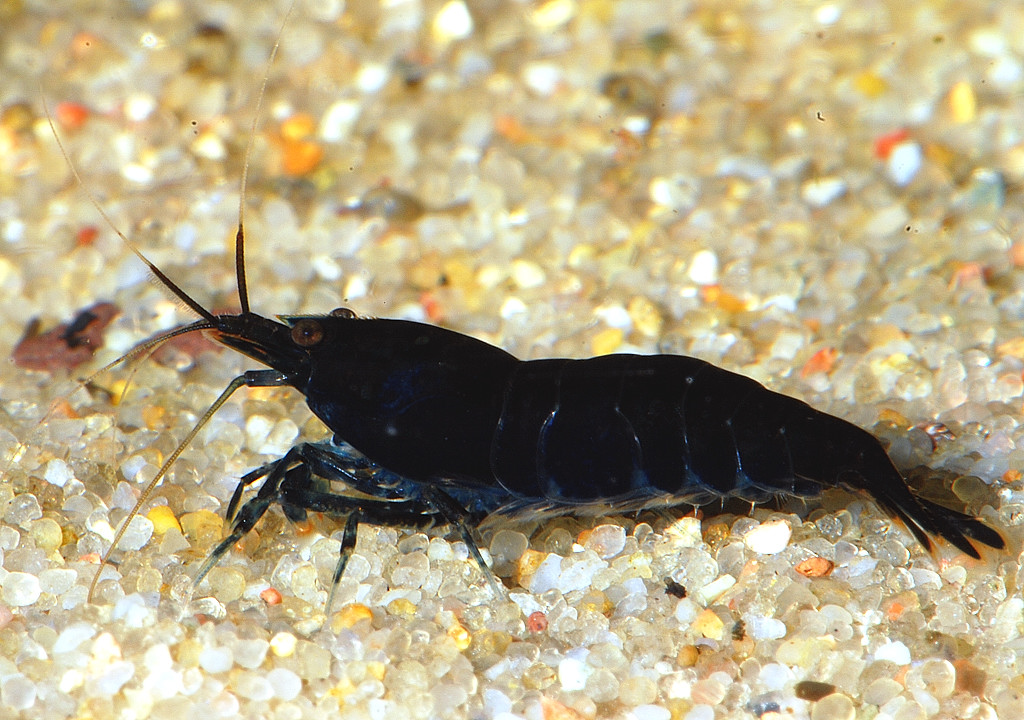
Black

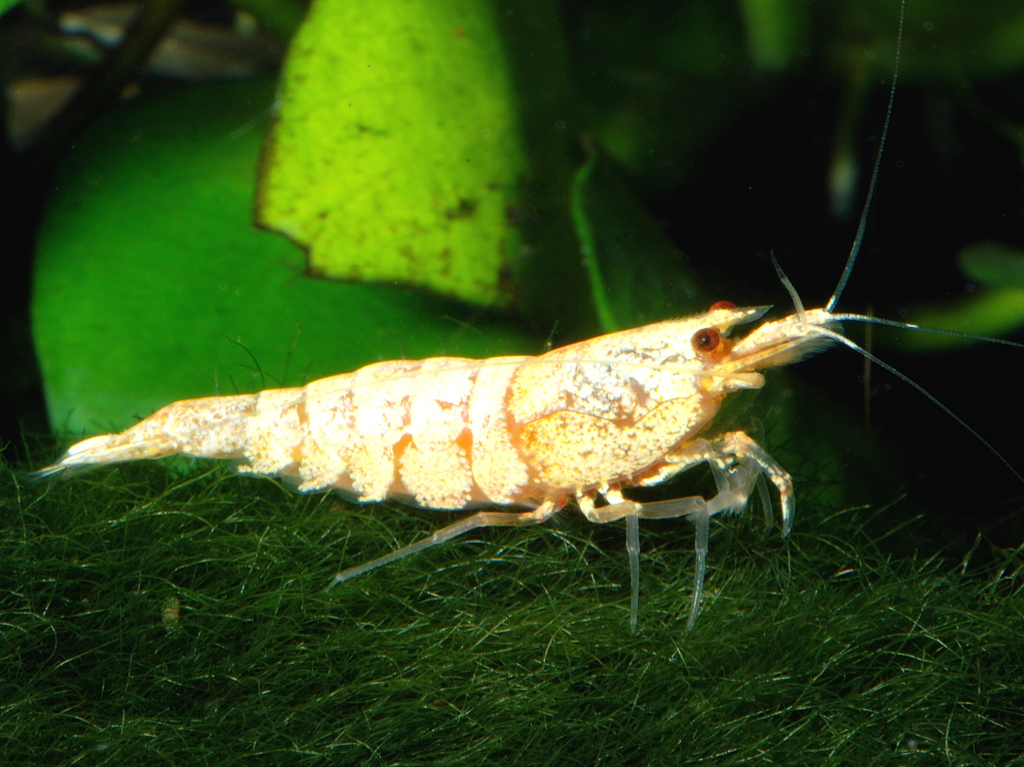
White

Crystal red shrimp in an aquarium
