= Golden bee shrimp =

Variety of crustacean

The golden bee shrimp is a variety of the bee shrimp species Caridina cantonensis.

== Appearance ==
The shrimp has a white outside shell and the flesh is an orange/golden color. Females are larger than males and the female's eggs are brown. The offspring are the same color as their parents when they emerge from the eggs .
