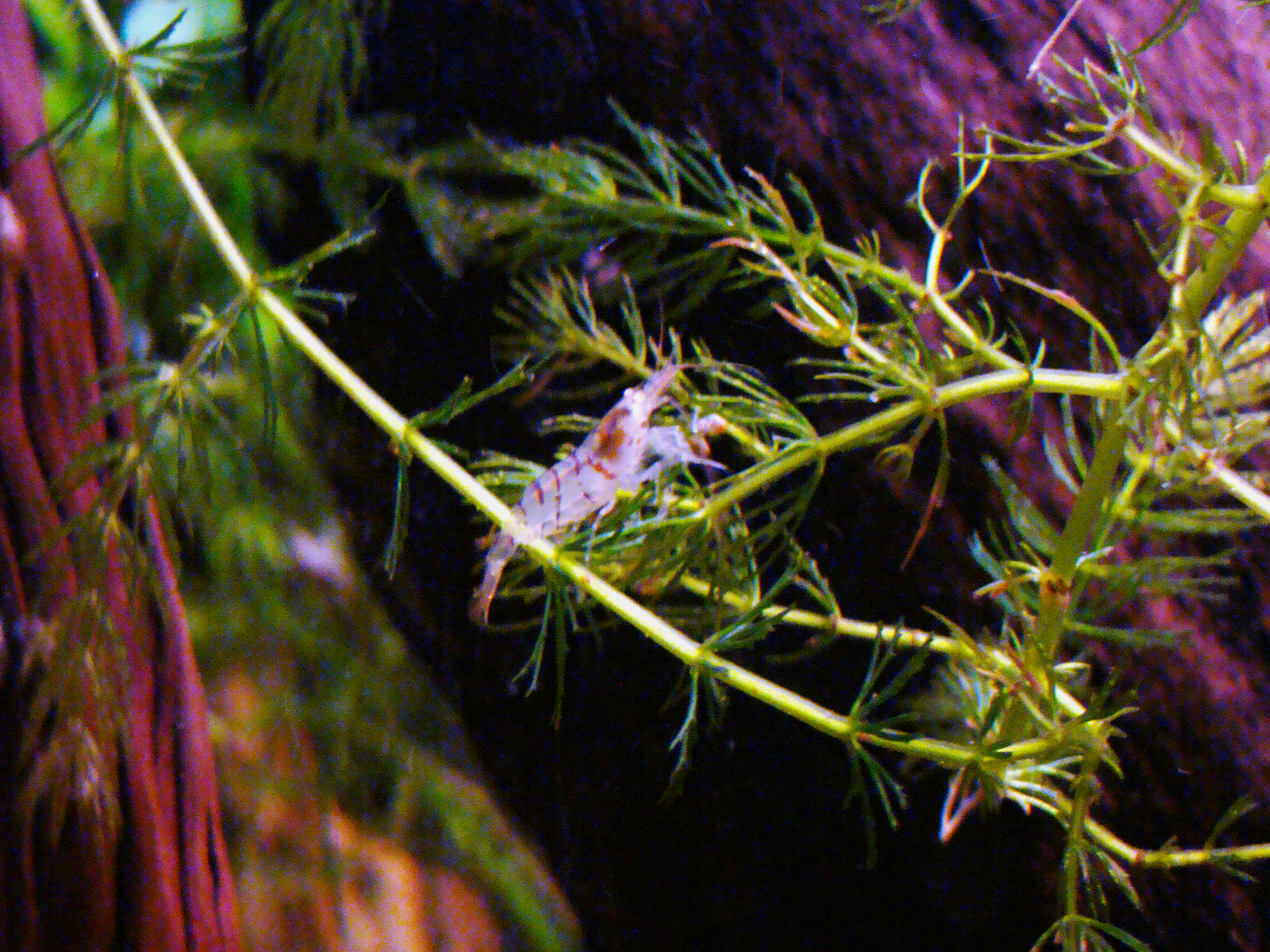

Scientific classification
- Kingdom: Animalia
- Phylum: Arthropoda
- Clade: Pancrustacea
- Class: Malacostraca
- Order: Decapoda
- Suborder: Pleocyemata
- Infraorder: Caridea
- Family: Atyidae
- Genus: Caridina
- Species: C. mariae

Binomial name
- Caridina mariae Klotz & von Rintelen, 2014

= Caridina mariae =

Freshwater shrimp

Caridina mariae, commonly known as the tiger shrimp, is a variety of freshwater shrimp from Southeast Asia (neighboring counties of Yingde and Conghua, Guangdong Province, Southern China and Hong Kong SAR) that are popular in hobby aquariums. The natural coloration of the shrimp is a semitransparent body, with dark brown to black blotches on the carapace, and dark brown to black "tiger" stripes along the posterior part of the carapace and along the first six abdominal segments. Variations of the species may also have orange eyes, and orange highlights in the tail fins. There is also a lack of dark markings on the tail fan

The name C. mariae was given in honor of the first author's wife, Maria, for "her support during several field trips and her abundant patience when the first author is spending most evenings behind the microscope".

At full size, these shrimp reach about 1–1.5 in (25–38 mm) in length, with females of the species being larger than the males, and having a curved underbelly. They prefer very clean, soft water with a pH of 6-7.5 (preferring a pH of about 6.5), and a temperature of 65–75 °F (18–24 °C).

Caridina mariae are peaceful, non-aggressive omnivores, and live for 1–2 years.

== Breeding ==
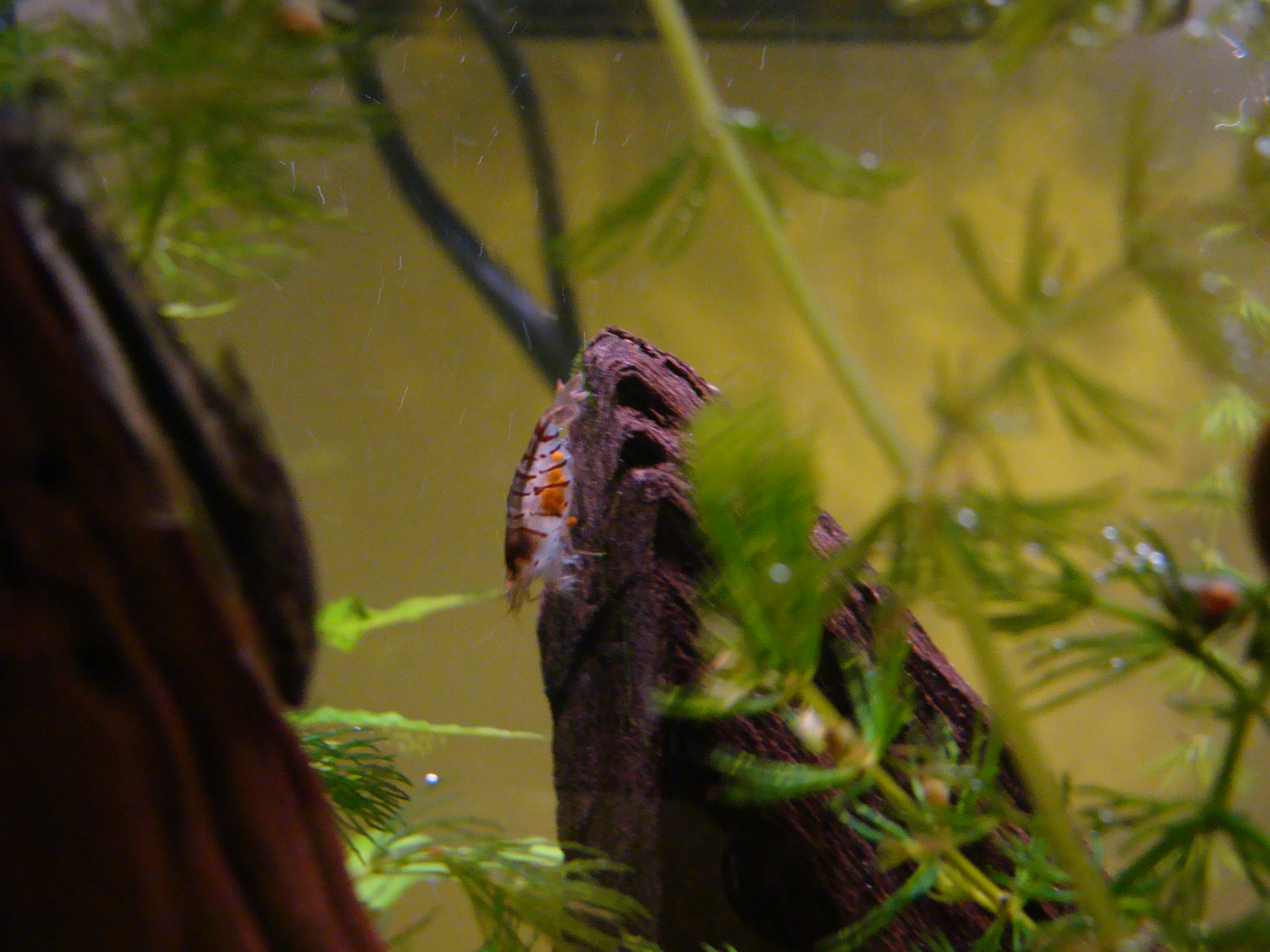
A female Caridina mariae with eggs carried within her swimmerets

Caridina mariae is a complex breeder which exhibits direct larval development and has only one larval stage before becoming juvenile. Their larval stage is well-developed and resembles the adult with functional walking pereiopods and swimming pleopods. The larval stage does not feed and can be classified as lecithotrophic.

Larvae are born not more than 3 mm (0.12 in) in length, and grow to full size through molting. The gestation period is about 30 days. Caution must be taken with filtration when the young when they are in an aquarium, as they can be pulled into the intake.

The young of this species will resemble adult tiger shrimp, with blue, orange, or yellow coloration, when applicable, becoming darker and more intense as the young mature.

== Taxonomy ==
C. mariae was described in a 2014 paper by Werner Klotz and Thomas Von Rintlen, in which the species was recovered as sister to C. cantonensis and C. logemanni (also described in that paper).

A 2020 phylogenetic analysis conducted by Chen, Chen, and Guo (which did not consider C. logemanni) likewise found Caridina mariae to be sister to C. cantonensis. The tree below is summarized from the analysis of Chen, Chen, and Guo:

- - - - C. cantonensis
      - C. mariae
    - - - C. serrata
        - C. tetrazona
      - C. trifasciata
  - - C. lanceifrons
    - C. zhujiangensis
- C. huananensis

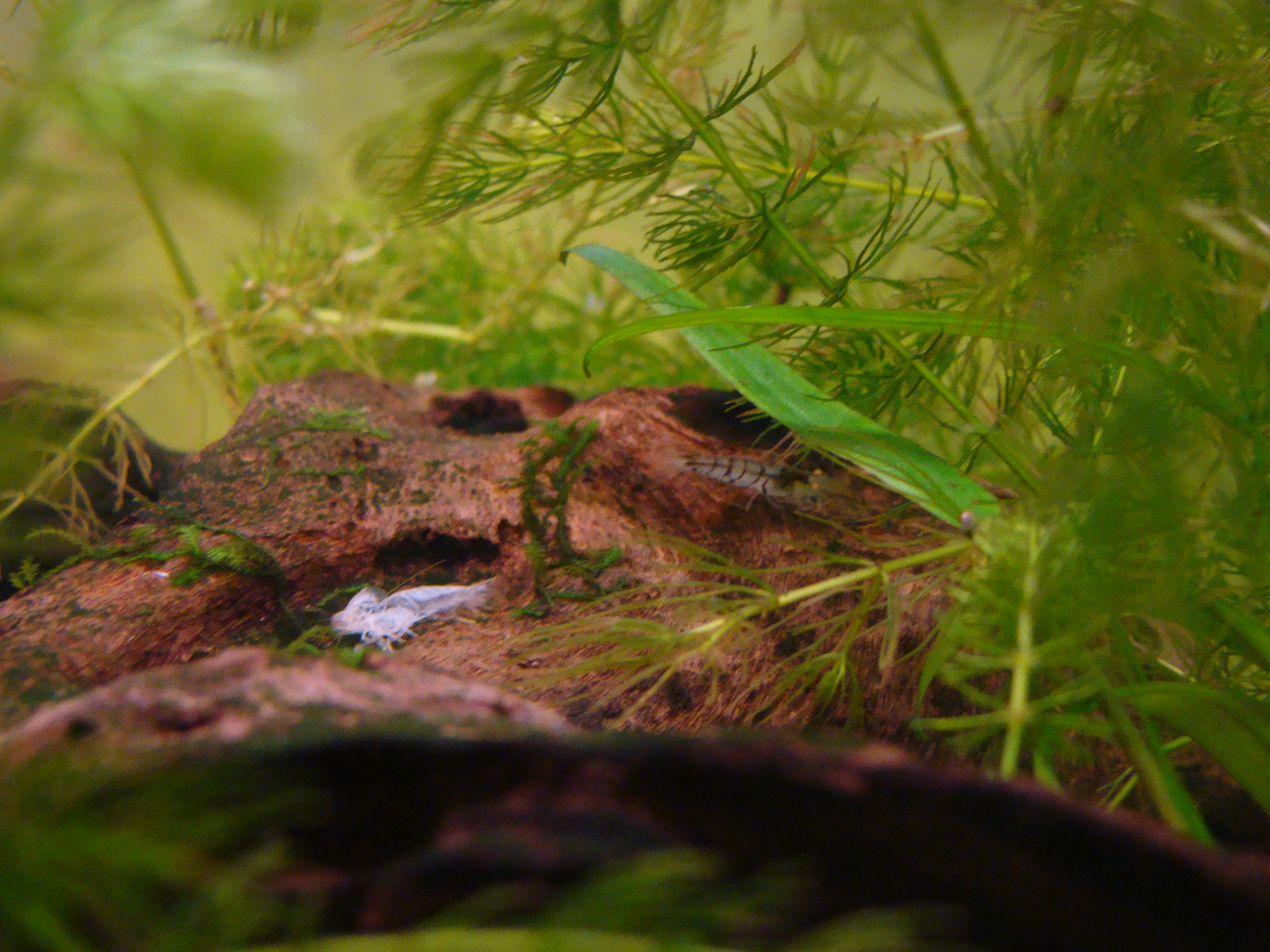
The shedded molting of a Caridina mariae, with an adult standing nearby
