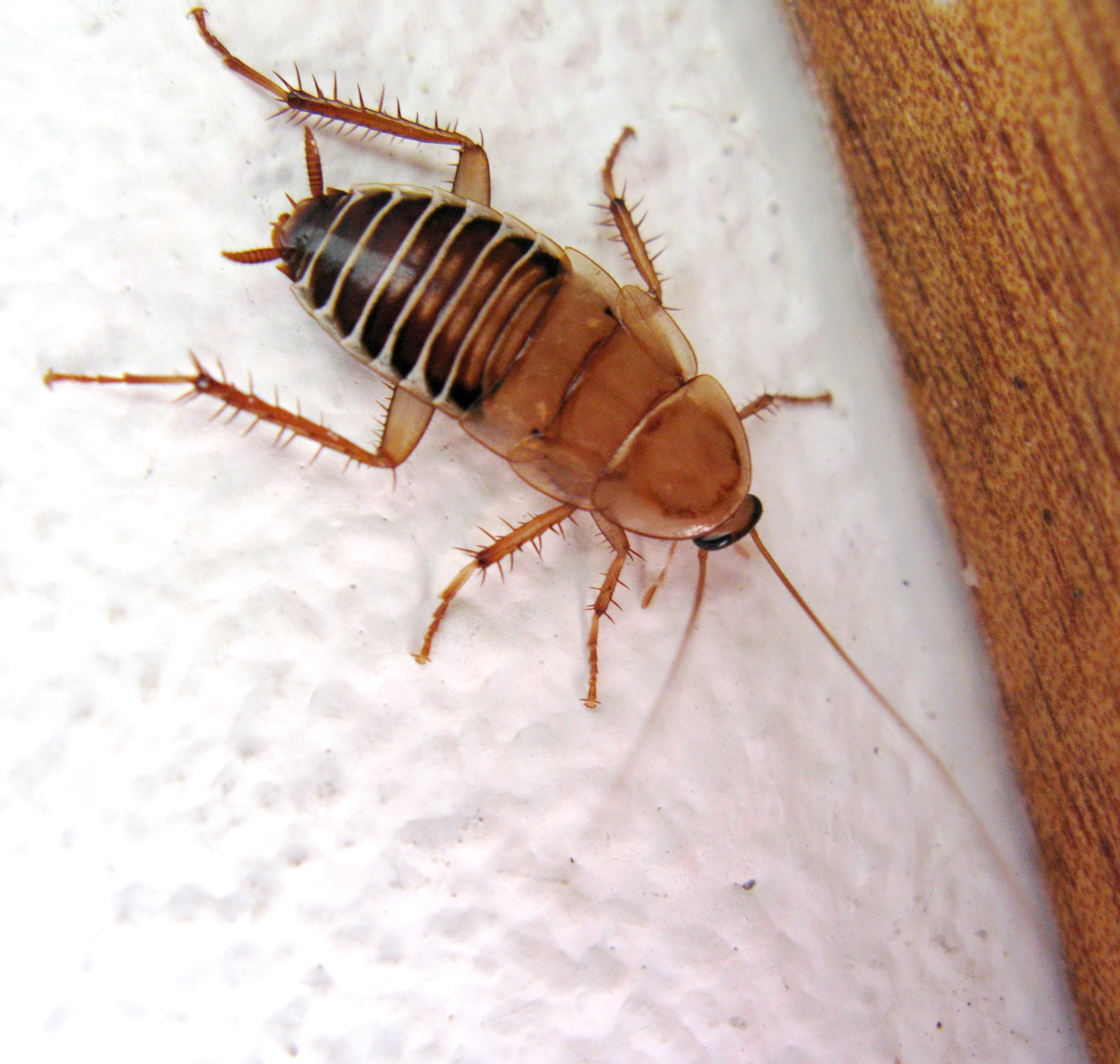
- Temnopteryx sp.

Scientific classification
- Kingdom: Animalia
- Phylum: Arthropoda
- Clade: Pancrustacea
- Class: Insecta
- Cohort: Polyneoptera
- Superorder: Dictyoptera; Latreille, 1829

Orders
- †"Roachoids" (paraphyletic); Blattodea (cockroaches and termites); Mantodea (mantids); †Alienoptera; †Alienopteridae; †Umenocoleidae

= Dictyoptera =

Dictyoptera Temporal range: Carboniferous–Recent, 320–0 Ma

Superorder of insects

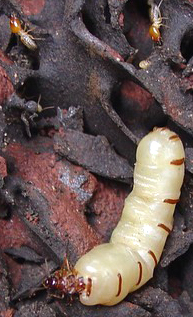
Termite queen with soldiers

Dictyoptera (from Greek δίκτυον diktyon "net" and πτερόν pteron "wing") is an insect superorder that includes two extant orders of polyneopterous insects: the order Blattodea (termites and cockroaches together) and the order Mantodea (mantises). All modern Dictyoptera have short ovipositors and typically lay oothecae. The oldest fossils of Dictyoptera from the Late Carboniferous, referred to as "roachoids" have long ovipositors and did not lay oothecae. The oldest modern oothecae-laying dictyopterans date to the Late Triassic.

== Classification and phylogeny ==
The use of the term Dictyoptera has changed over the years, and while largely out of use for much of the last century, it is becoming more widely used. It has usually been considered a superorder, with Isoptera, Blattodea and Mantodea being its three orders. In some classifications, however, Dictyoptera is shifted to order status and in others the order Isoptera has been subsumed under Blattodea while retaining Dictyoptera as a superorder. Regardless, in all classifications the constituent groups are the same, just treated at different rank. Termites and cockroaches are very closely related, with ecological and molecular data pointing to a relationship with the cockroach genus Cryptocercus.

According to genetic evidence, the closest living relatives of the Dictyoptera are the orders Phasmatodea, Mantophasmatodea, and Grylloblattodea. If the Dictyoptera are considered a superorder these other orders might be included in it.

Evolutionary relationships based on Eggleton, Beccaloni & Inward 2007 and modified by Evangelista et al. 2019, are shown in the cladogram: The cockroach families Anaplectidae, Lamproblattidae, and Tryonicidae are not shown but are placed within the superfamily Blattoidea. The cockroach families Corydiidae and Ectobiidae were previously known as the Polyphagidae and Blattellidae. The cladogram also shows the family Alienopteridae (originally assigned to its own order "Alienoptera") as sister to Mantodea, but it was subsequently reassigned to the extinct Blattodea superfamily Umenocoleoidea by Vršanský et al..

- Dictyoptera
  - - Mantodea (Mantises)
    - †Alienopteridae
  - Blattodea
    - Blaberoidea
      - Ectobiidae
      - - Pseudophyllodromiinae
        - - Blattellinae
          - Blaberidae (Giant cockroaches)
    - Solumblattodea
      - Corydiodea
        - Corydiidae (Sand cockroaches, etc)
        - Nocticolidae (Cave cockroaches, etc)
      - Blattoidea
        - Blattoidae
          - Tryonicidae
          - Blattidae (Oriental, American and other cockroaches)
        - Kittrickea
          - Lamproblattidae
          - Xylophagodea
            - Cryptocercoidae
              Cryptocercidae (brown-hooded cockroaches)
            - Termitoidae (Termites)
              - Mastotermitidae
              - Euisoptera
                - - Archotermopsidae
                  - Hodotermitidae
                - - Stolotermitidae
                  - - Kalotermitidae
                    - - Stylotermitidae
                      - - Rhinotermitidae
                        - - Serritermitidae
                          - Termitidae

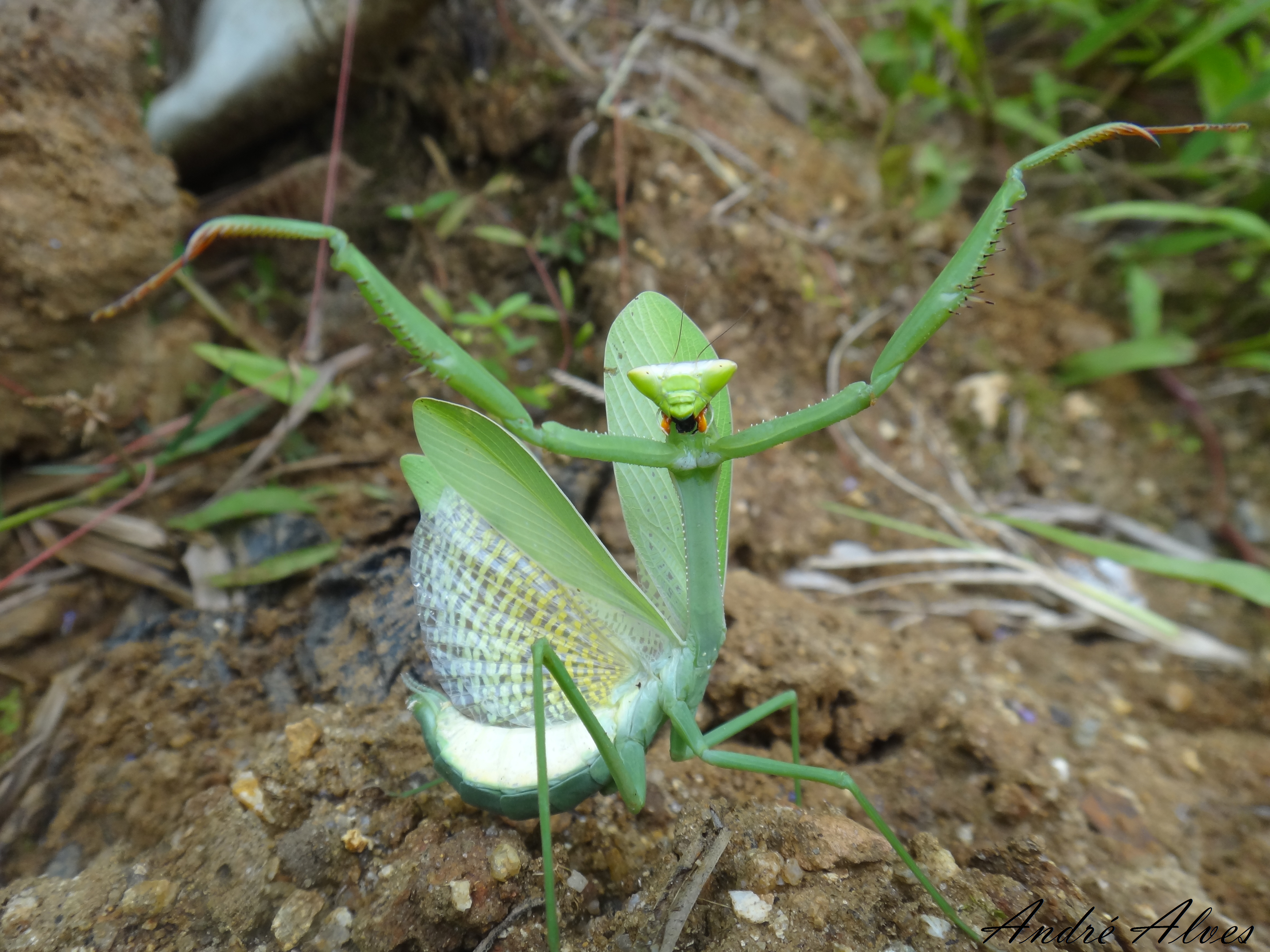
Deimatic behaviour of the mantis Oxyopsis sp.
