= Manipulator =

Manipulator is a person who uses devious means to exploit, control, or otherwise influence others to their advantage.

Manipulator may also refer to:

- Manipulator (device), a device used to manipulate materials without direct contact
- Manipulator (insect), an extinct cockroach
- Manipulator (The Fall of Troy album), 2007
- Manipulator (EP), an EP by Arsenal
- Manipulator (Ty Segall album), 2014

== See also ==
- Manipulation (disambiguation)
