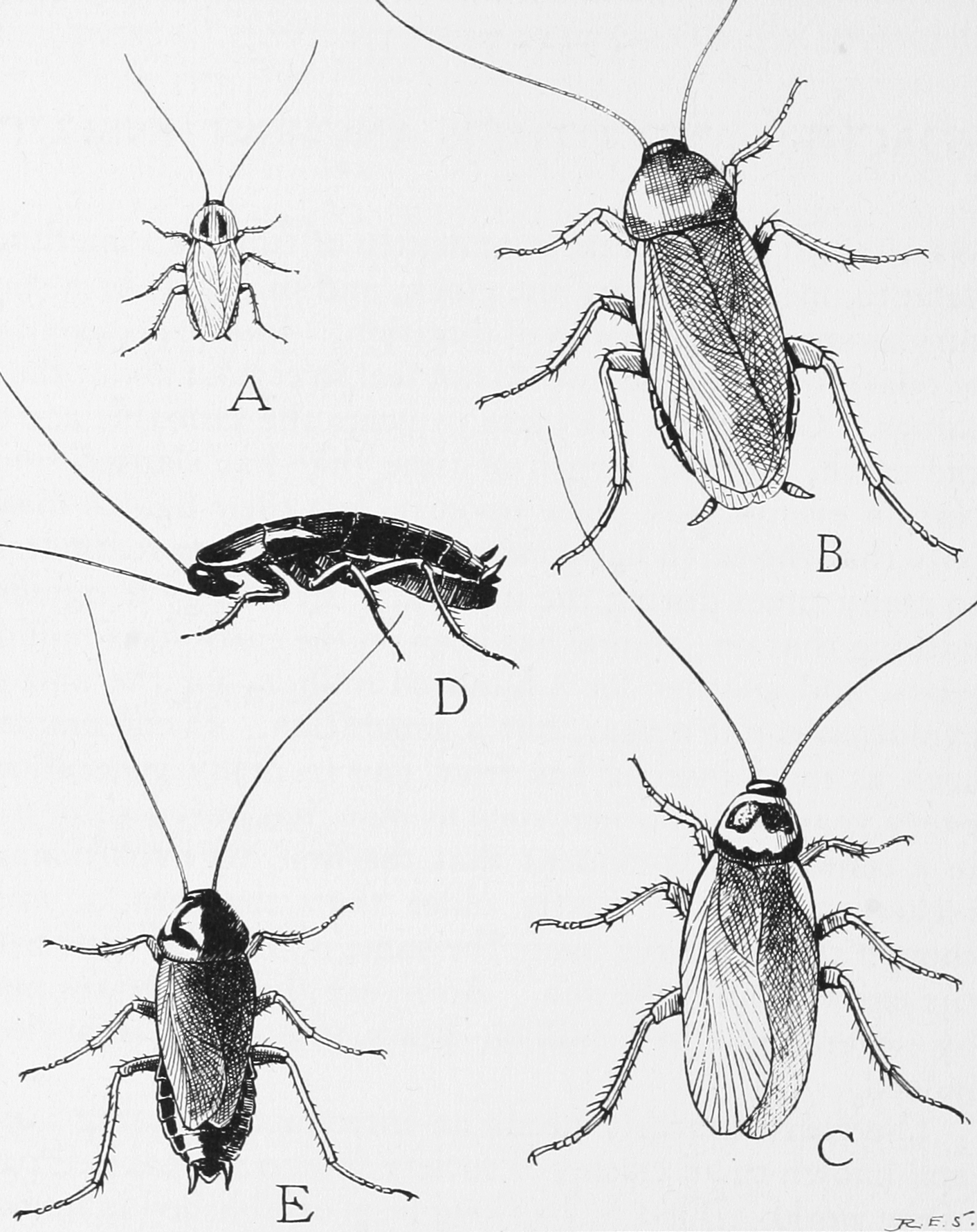
- Common household cockroaches A) German cockroach B) American cockroach C) Australian cockroach D&E) Oriental cockroach (♀ & ♂)

Scientific classification
- Kingdom: Animalia
- Phylum: Arthropoda
- Clade: Pancrustacea
- Class: Insecta
- Superorder: Dictyoptera
- Order: Blattodea

Families
- Anaplectidae; Blaberidae; Blattidae; Corydiidae; Cryptocercidae; Ectobiidae; Lamproblattidae; Nocticolidae; Tryonicidae

= Cockroach =

Cockroach Temporal range: Late Jurassic–Present

Insects of the order Blattodea

Cockroaches (or roaches) are insects belonging to the order Blattodea (Blattaria). About 30 cockroach species out of 4,600 are associated with human habitats. Some species are well-known pests.

Modern cockroaches are an ancient group that first appeared during the Late Jurassic. Their ancestors, known as "roachoids", likely originated during the Carboniferous period around 320 million years ago. Those early ancestors, however, lacked the internal ovipositors of modern roaches. Cockroaches are somewhat generalized insects lacking special adaptations (such as the sucking mouthparts of aphids and other true bugs); they have chewing mouthparts and are probably among the most primitive of living Neopteran insects. They are common and hardy insects capable of tolerating a wide range of climates, from Arctic cold to tropical heat. Tropical cockroaches are often much larger than temperate species.

Modern cockroaches are not considered to be a monophyletic group, as it has been found based on genetics that termites are deeply nested within the group, with some groups of cockroaches more closely related to termites than they are to other cockroaches, thus rendering Blattaria paraphyletic. Both cockroaches and termites are included in Blattodea.

Some species, such as the gregarious German cockroach, have an elaborate social structure involving common shelter, social dependence, information transfer and kin recognition. Cockroaches have appeared in human culture since classical antiquity. They are popularly depicted as large, dirty pests, although the majority of species are small and inoffensive and live in a wide range of habitats around the world. The irrational fear of cockroaches is called katsaridaphobia.

== Taxonomy and evolution ==
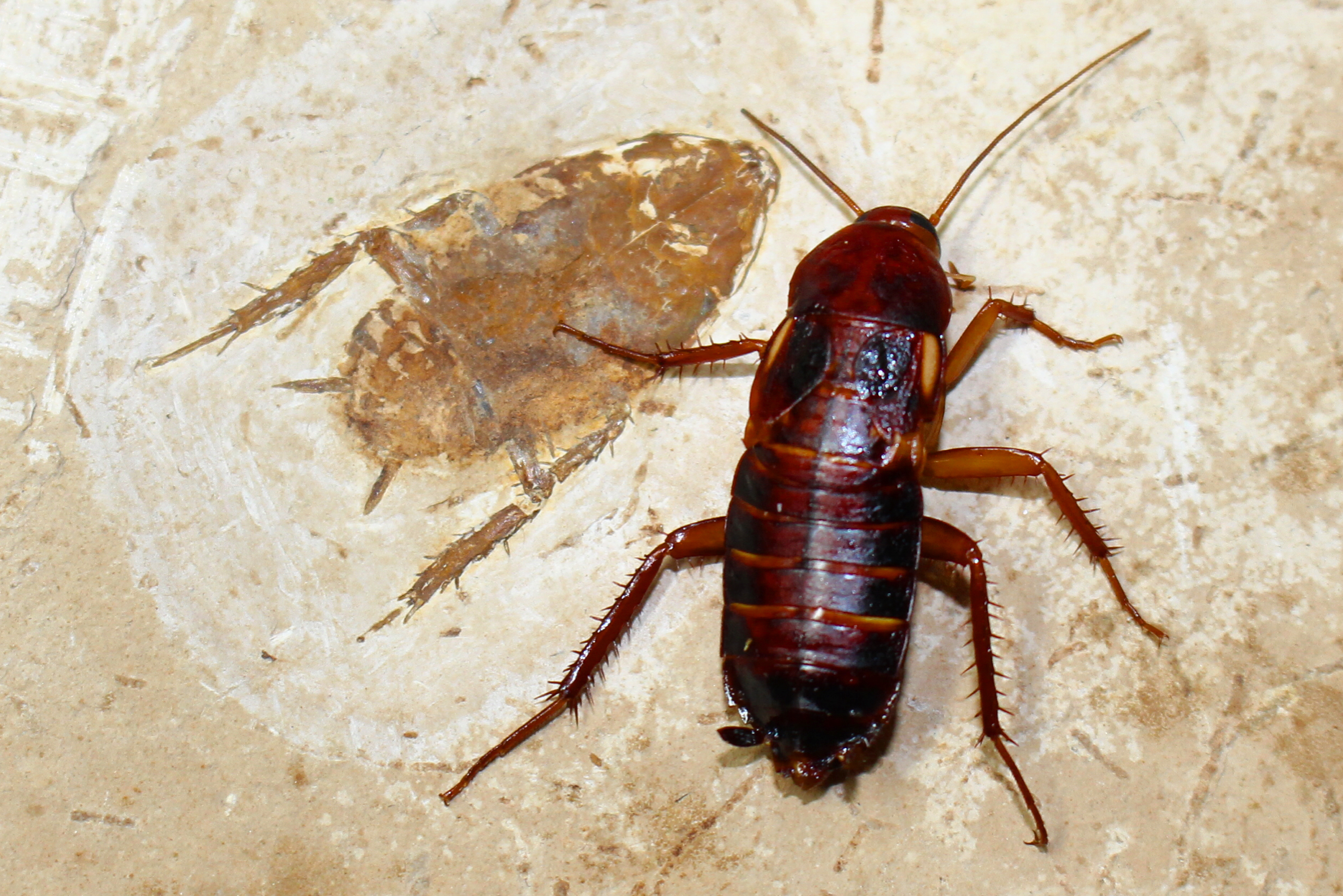
A Turkestan cockroach (Periplaneta lateralis) next to an approximately 108-million-year-old fossil cockroach from the Cretaceous Period

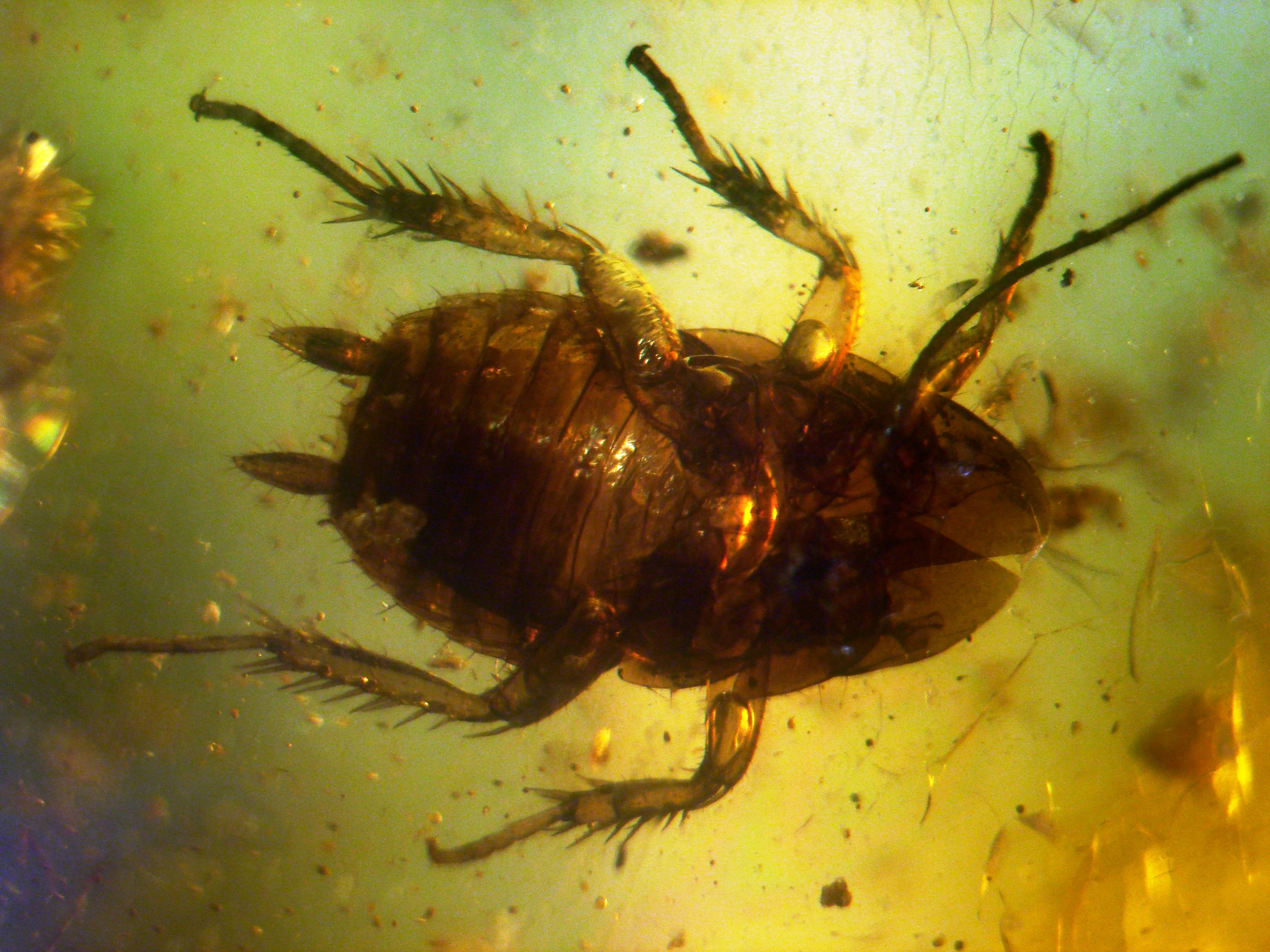
A 40- to 50-million-year-old cockroach in Baltic amber (Eocene)

Cockroaches are members of the superorder Dictyoptera, which includes the termites and mantids, a group of insects once thought to be separate from cockroaches. Currently, 4,600 species and over 460 genera are described worldwide. The name "cockroach" comes from the Spanish word for cockroach, cucaracha, transformed by 1620s English folk etymology into "cock" and "roach". The scientific name derives from the Latin blatta, "an insect that shuns the light", which in classical Latin was applied not only to cockroaches, but also to mantids.

Historically, the name Blattaria was used largely interchangeably with the name Blattodea, but whilst Blattaria was used to refer to 'true' cockroaches exclusively, the Blattodea also includes the termites. The current catalogue of world cockroach species uses the name Blattodea for the group. Another name, Blattoptera, is also sometimes used to refer to extinct cockroach relatives.

The earliest cockroach-like fossils ("blattopterans" or "roachoids") are from the Carboniferous period 320 million years ago. Fossil roachoids are considered the common ancestor of both mantises and modern cockroaches, and are distinguished from the latter by the presence of a long external ovipositor. As the body, hind wings and mouthparts are not preserved in fossils frequently, the relationship of these roachoids and modern cockroaches remains disputed. The earliest definitive fossils of modern crown group cockroaches, specifically Corydiidae, are known from the Late Jurassic strata of Russia and the Kimmeridgian-aged Karabastau Formation of Kazakhstan.

The evolutionary relationships of the Blattodea (cockroaches and termites) shown in the cladogram are based on Inward, Beccaloni and Eggleton (2007). The cockroach families Anaplectidae, Lamproblattidae, and Tryonicidae are not shown but are placed within the superfamily Blattoidea. The cockroach families Corydiidae and Ectobiidae were previously known as the Polyphagidae and Blattellidae.

- Dictyoptera
  - - Blattodea
      - - - - Blattoidea
              - - Termitoidae (termites)
                  - - - - Termitidae
                        - Rhinotermitidae
                      - Kalotermitidae
                    - - Archotermopsidae
                      - Hodotermitidae
                  - Mastotermitidae
                - Cryptocercoidae
                  Cryptocercidae (brown-hooded cockroaches)
              - Blattoidae
                Blattidae (Oriental, American and other cockroaches)
            - Blaberoidea
              - - Blaberidae (giant cockroaches)
                - Ectobiidae (part)
              - Ectobiidae (part)
          - Corydioidea
            - Corydiidae (sand cockroaches, etc)
            - Nocticolidae (cave cockroaches, etc)
    - Mantodea (mantises)

Termites were previously regarded as a separate order Isoptera to cockroaches. However, recent genetic evidence strongly suggests that they evolved directly from 'true' cockroaches, and many authors now place them as an "epifamily" of Blattodea. This evidence supported a hypothesis suggested in 1934 that termites are closely related to the wood-eating cockroaches (genus Cryptocercus). This hypothesis was originally based on similarity of the symbiotic gut flagellates in termites regarded as living fossils and wood-eating cockroaches. Additional evidence emerged when F. A. McKittrick (1965) noted similar morphological characteristics between some termites and cockroach nymphs. The similarities among these cockroaches and termites have led some scientists to reclassify termites as a single family, the Termitidae, within the order Blattodea. Other scientists have taken a more conservative approach, proposing to retain the termites as the Termitoidae, an epifamily within the order. Such a measure preserves the classification of termites at family level and below.

== Description ==
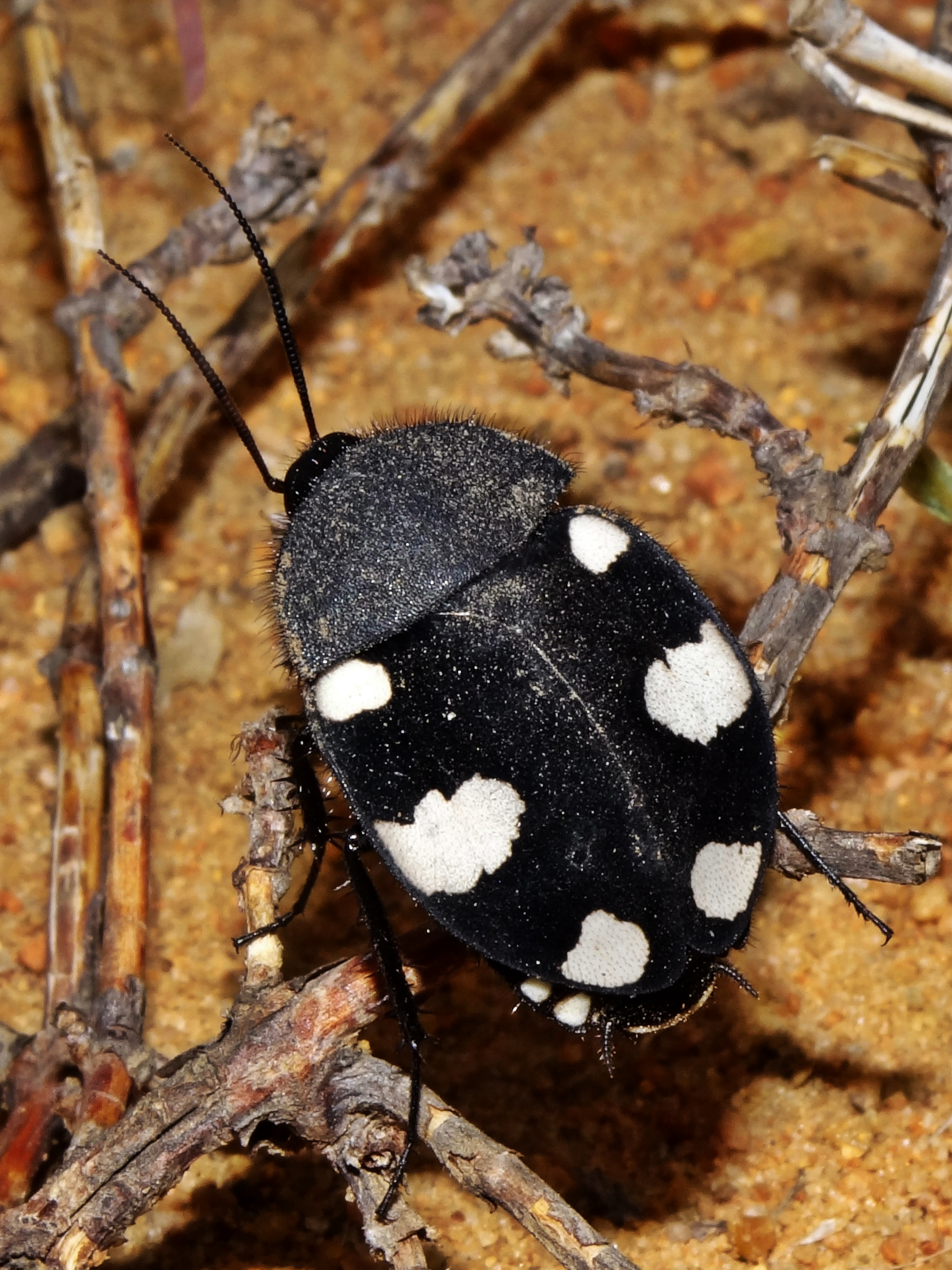
Domino cockroach Therea petiveriana, normally found in India

Most species of cockroach are about the size of a thumbnail, but several species are notably larger. The world's heaviest cockroach is the Australian giant burrowing cockroach Macropanesthia rhinoceros, which can reach 8 centimetres (3 in) in length and weigh up to 35 grams (1.2 oz). Comparable in size is the Central American giant cockroach Blaberus giganteus. The longest cockroach species is Megaloblatta longipennis, which can reach 97 mm (3 7/8 in) in length and 45 mm (1 3/4 in) across. A Central and South American species, Megaloblatta blaberoides, has the largest wingspan of up to 185 mm (7 1/4 in). At the other end of the size scale, Attaphila cockroaches that live with leaf-cutter ants include some of the world's smallest species, growing to about 3.5 mm in length.

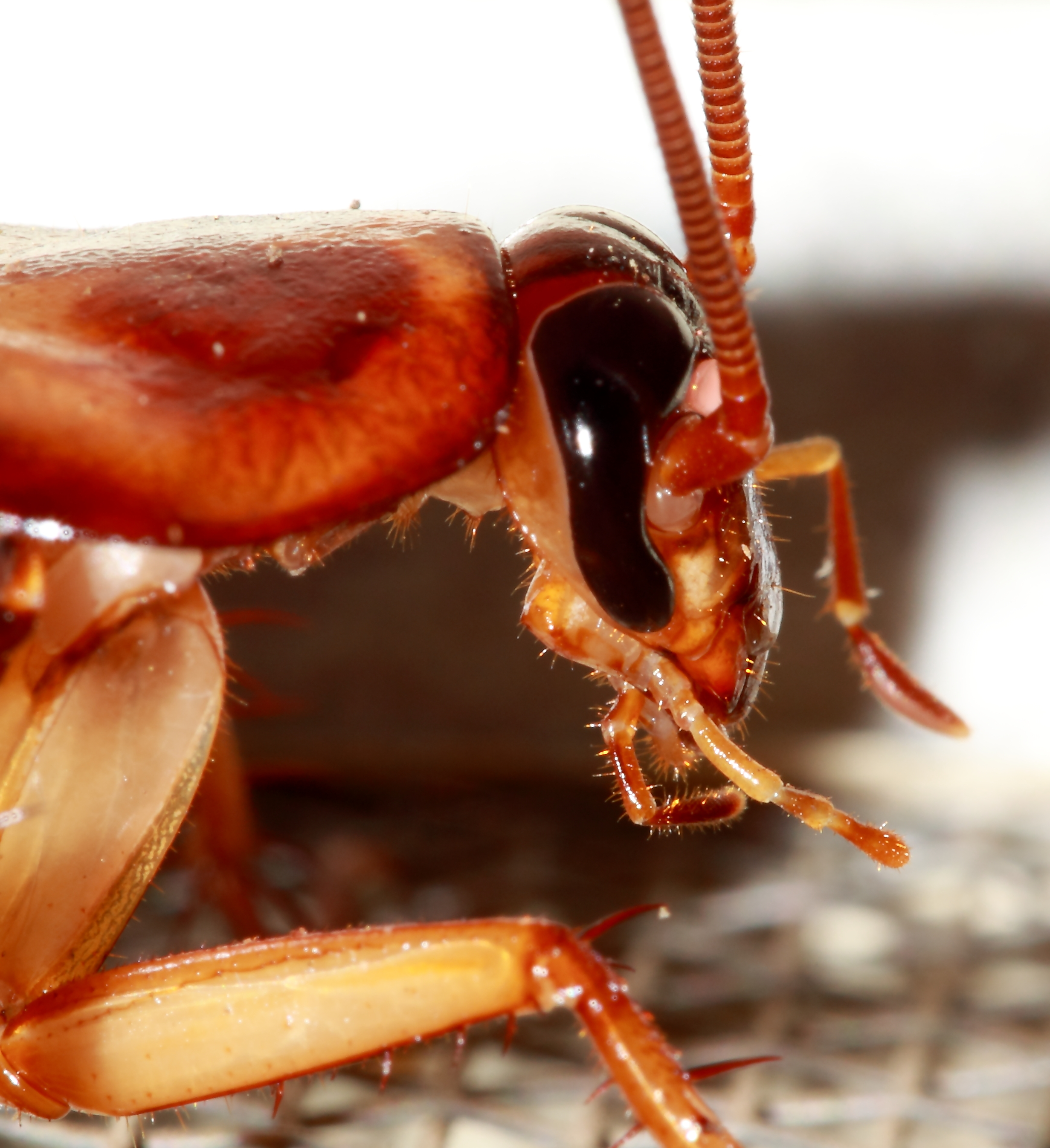
Head of Periplaneta americana

Cockroaches are generalized insects with few special adaptations, and may be among the most primitive living Neopteran insects. They have a relatively small head and a broad, flattened body, and most species are reddish-brown to dark brown. They have large compound eyes, two ocelli, and long, flexible antennae. The mouthparts are on the underside of the head and include generalized chewing mandibles, salivary glands and various touch and taste receptors.

The body is divided into a thorax of three segments and a ten-segmented abdomen. The external surface has a tough exoskeleton which contains calcium carbonate; this protects the inner organs and provides attachment to muscles. This external exoskeleton is coated with wax to repel water. The wings are attached to the second and third thoracic segments. The tegmina, or first pair of wings, are tough and protective; these lay as a shield on top of the membranous hind wings, which are used in flight. All four wings have branching longitudinal veins, as well as multiple cross-veins.

The three pairs of legs are sturdy, with large coxae and five claws each. They are attached to each of the three thoracic segments. Of these, the front legs are the shortest and the hind legs the longest, providing the main propulsive power when the insect runs. The spines on the legs were earlier considered to be sensory, but observations of the insect's gait on sand and wire meshes have demonstrated that they help in locomotion on difficult terrain. The structures have been used as inspiration for robotic legs.

The abdomen has ten segments, each having a pair of spiracles for respiration. In addition to the spiracles, the final segment consists of a pair of cerci, a pair of anal styles, the anus and the external genitalia. Males have an aedeagus through which they secrete sperm during copulation, while females have spermatheca for storing sperm and an ovipositor through which the oothecae are laid.

== Distribution and habitat ==
Cockroaches are abundant throughout the world and live in a wide range of environments, especially in the tropics and subtropics. In North America, 50 species separated into five families are found throughout the continent. 450 species are found in Australia. Only about four widespread species are commonly regarded as pests.

Cockroaches occupy a wide range of habitats. Many live in leaf litter, among the stems of matted vegetation, in rotting wood, in holes in stumps, in cavities under bark, under log piles and among debris. Some live in arid regions and have developed mechanisms to survive without access to water sources. Others are aquatic, living near the surface of water bodies, including bromeliad phytotelmata, and diving to forage for food. Most of these respire by piercing the water surface with the tip of the abdomen which acts as a snorkel, but some carry a bubble of air under their thoracic shield when they submerge. By doing this, cockroaches can remain submerged for up to 40 minutes. Others live in the forest canopy where they may be one of the main types of invertebrate present. Here they may hide during the day in crevices, among dead leaves, in bird and insect nests or among epiphytes, emerging at night to feed.

== Behavior ==
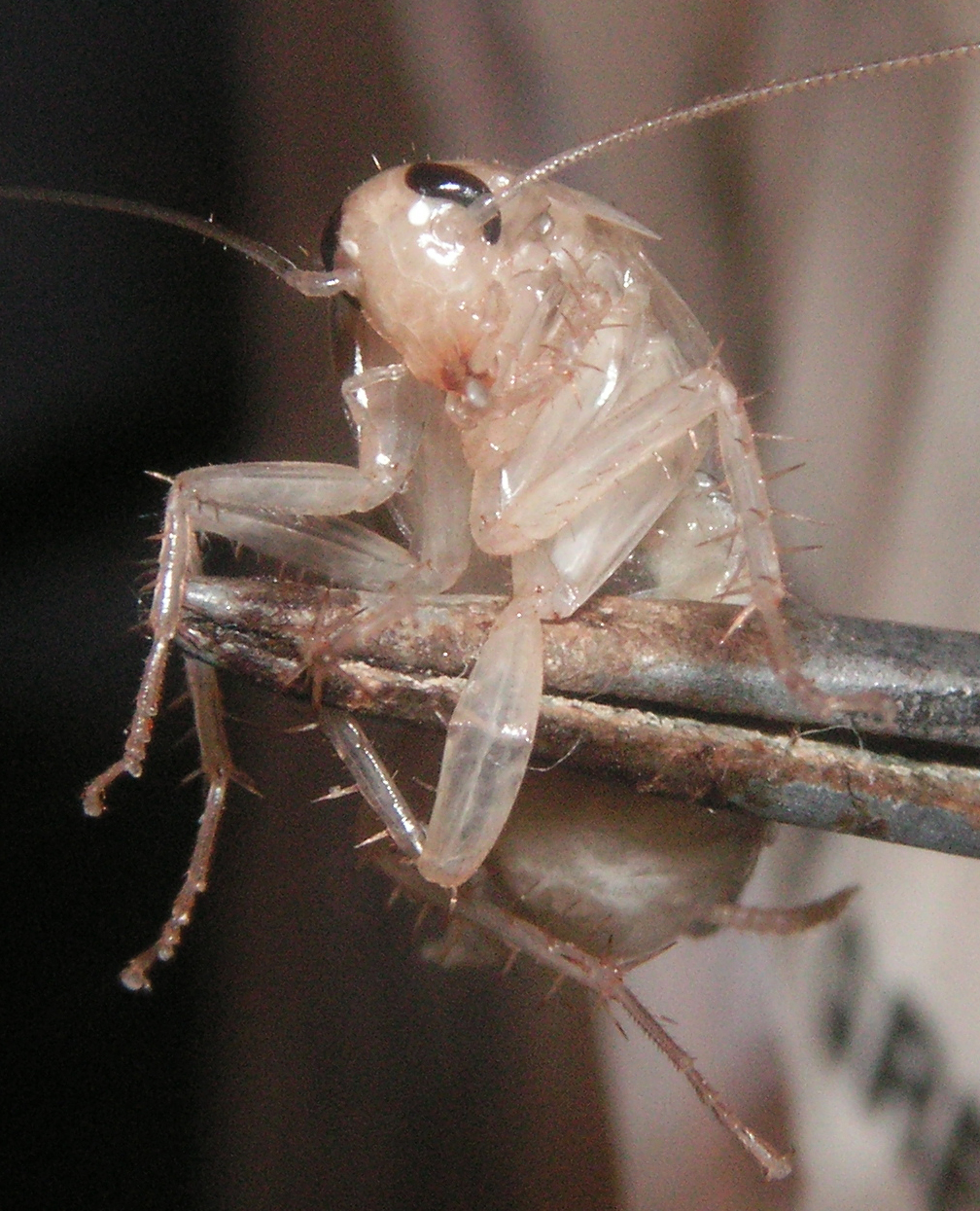
A cockroach soon after ecdysis

Cockroaches are social insects; a large number of species are either gregarious or inclined to aggregate, and a slightly smaller number exhibit parental care. It used to be thought that cockroaches aggregated because they were reacting to environmental cues, but it is now believed that pheromones are involved in these behaviors. Some species secrete these in their feces with gut microbial symbionts being involved, while others use glands located on their mandibles. Pheromones produced by the cuticle may enable cockroaches to distinguish between different populations of cockroach by odor. The behaviors involved have been studied in only a few species, but German cockroaches leave fecal trails with an odor gradient. Other cockroaches follow such trails to discover sources of food and water, and where other cockroaches are hiding. Thus, cockroaches have emergent behavior, in which group or swarm behavior emerges from a simple set of individual interactions.

Daily rhythms may also be regulated by a complex set of hormonal controls of which only a small subset have been understood. In 2005, the role of one of these proteins, pigment dispersing factor (PDF), was isolated and found to be a key mediator in the circadian rhythms of the cockroach.

Pest species adapt readily to a variety of environments, but prefer warm conditions found within buildings. Many tropical species prefer even warmer environments. Cockroaches are mainly nocturnal and run away when exposed to light. An exception to this is the Asian cockroach, which flies mostly at night but is attracted to brightly lit surfaces and pale colors.

=== Collective decision-making ===
Gregarious cockroaches display collective decision-making when choosing food sources. When a sufficient number of individuals (a "quorum") exploits a food source, this signals to newcomer cockroaches that they should stay there longer rather than leave for elsewhere. Other mathematical models have been developed to explain aggregation dynamics and conspecific recognition.

Cooperation and competition are balanced in cockroach group decision-making behavior.

Cockroaches appear to use just two pieces of information to decide where to go, namely how dark it is and how many other cockroaches there are. A study used specially scented roach-sized robots that seem real to the roaches to demonstrate that once there are enough insects in a place to form a critical mass, the roaches accepted the collective decision on where to hide, even if this was an unusually lit place.

=== Social behavior ===
When reared in isolation, German cockroaches show behavior that is different from behavior when reared in a group. In one study, isolated cockroaches were less likely to leave their shelters and explore, spent less time eating, interacted less with conspecifics when exposed to them, and, among males, took longer to recognize receptive females. Because these changes occurred in many contexts, the authors suggested them as constituting a behavioral syndrome. These effects might have been due either to reduced metabolic and developmental rates in isolated individuals or the fact that the isolated individuals had not had a training period to learn about what others were like via their antennae.

Individual American cockroaches appear to have consistently different "personalities" regarding how they seek shelter. In addition, group personality is not simply the sum of individual choices, but reflects conformity and collective decision-making.

The gregarious German and American cockroaches have elaborate social structure, chemical signaling, and "social herd" characteristics. Lihoreau and his fellow researchers stated:

The social biology of domiciliary cockroaches ... can be characterized by a common shelter, overlapping generations, non-closure of groups, equal reproductive potential of group members, an absence of task specialization, high levels of social dependence, central place foraging, social information transfer, kin recognition, and a meta-population structure.

There is evidence that a few species of group-living roaches in the genera Melyroidea and Aclavoidea may exhibit a reproductive division of labor, which, if confirmed, would make these the only genuinely eusocial lineage known among roaches, in contrast to the subsocial members of the genus Cryptocercus.

=== Sounds ===
Some species make a buzzing noise while other cockroaches make a chirping noise. Gromphadorhina species and Archiblatta hoeveni produce sound through the modified spiracles on the fourth abdominal segment. In the former species, several different hisses are produced, including disturbance sounds, produced by adults and larger nymphs; and aggressive, courtship and copulatory sounds produced by adult males. Henschoutedenia epilamproides has a stridulatory organ between its thorax and abdomen, but the purpose of the sound produced is unclear.

Several Australian species practice acoustic and vibration behaviour as an aspect of courtship. They have been observed producing hisses and whistles from air forced through the spiracles. Furthermore, in the presence of a potential mate, some cockroaches tap the substrate in a rhythmic, repetitive manner. Acoustic signals may be of greater prevalence amongst perching species, particularly those that live on low vegetation in Australia's tropics.

== Biology ==
=== Digestive tract ===
Cockroaches are generally omnivorous; the American cockroach (Periplaneta americana), for example, feeds on a great variety of foodstuffs including bread, fruit, leather, starch in book bindings, paper, glue, skin flakes, hair, dead insects and soiled clothing. Many species of cockroach harbor in their gut symbiotic protozoans and bacteria which are able to digest cellulose. In many species, these symbionts may be essential if the insect is to utilize cellulose; however, some species secrete cellulase in their saliva, and the wood-eating cockroach, Panesthia cribrata, is able to survive indefinitely on a diet of crystallized cellulose while being free of microorganisms.

The similarity of these symbionts in the genus Cryptocercus to those in termites are such that these cockroaches have been suggested to be more closely related to termites than to other cockroaches, and current research strongly supports this hypothesis about their relationships. All species studied so far carry the obligate mutualistic endosymbiont bacterium Blattabacterium, with the exception of Nocticola, an Australian cave-dwelling genus without eyes, pigment or wings, which recent genetic studies indicate is a very primitive cockroach. It had previously been thought that all five families of cockroach were descended from a common ancestor that was infected with B. cuenoti. It may be that N. australiensis subsequently lost its symbionts, or alternatively this hypothesis will need to be re-examined.

=== Tracheae and breathing ===
Like other insects, cockroaches breathe through a system of tubes called tracheae which are attached to openings called spiracles on all body segments. When the carbon dioxide level in the insect rises high enough, valves on the spiracles open and carbon dioxide diffuses out and oxygen diffuses in. The tracheal system branches repeatedly, the finest tracheoles bringing air directly to each cell, allowing gaseous exchange to take place.

While cockroaches do not have lungs as do vertebrates and can continue to respire if their heads are removed, in some very large species, the body musculature may contract rhythmically to forcibly move air in and out of the spiracles; this may be considered a form of breathing.

=== Reproduction ===
Cockroaches use pheromones to attract mates, and the males practice courtship rituals, such as posturing and stridulation. Like many insects, cockroaches mate facing away from each other with their genitalia in contact, and copulation can be prolonged. A few species are known to be parthenogenetic, reproducing without the need for males.

Female cockroaches are sometimes seen carrying egg cases on the end of their abdomens; the German cockroach holds about 30 to 40 long, thin eggs in a case called an ootheca. She drops the capsule prior to hatching, though live births do occur in rare instances. The egg capsule may take more than five hours to lay and is initially bright white in color. The eggs are hatched from the combined pressure of the hatchlings gulping air. The hatchlings are initially bright white nymphs and continue inflating themselves with air, becoming harder and darker within about four hours. Their transient white stage while hatching and later while molting has led to claims of albino cockroaches. Development from eggs to adults takes three to four months. Cockroaches live up to a year, and the female may produce up to eight egg cases in a lifetime; in favorable conditions, she can produce 300 to 400 offspring. Other species of cockroaches, however, can produce far more eggs; in some cases a female needs to be impregnated only once to be able to lay eggs for the rest of her life.

The female usually attaches the egg case to a substrate, inserts it into a suitably protective crevice, or carries it about until just before the eggs hatch. Some species, however, are ovoviviparous, keeping the eggs inside their body, with or without an egg case, until they hatch. At least one genus, Diploptera, is fully viviparous.

Cockroaches have incomplete metamorphosis, meaning that the nymphs are generally similar to the adults, except for undeveloped wings and genitalia. Development is generally slow, and may take a few months to over a year. The adults are also long-lived; some have survived for as many as four years in the laboratory.

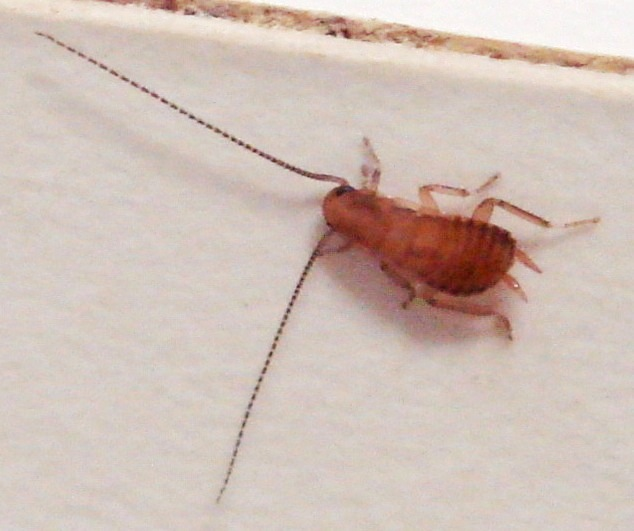
3 millimeter cockroach nymph

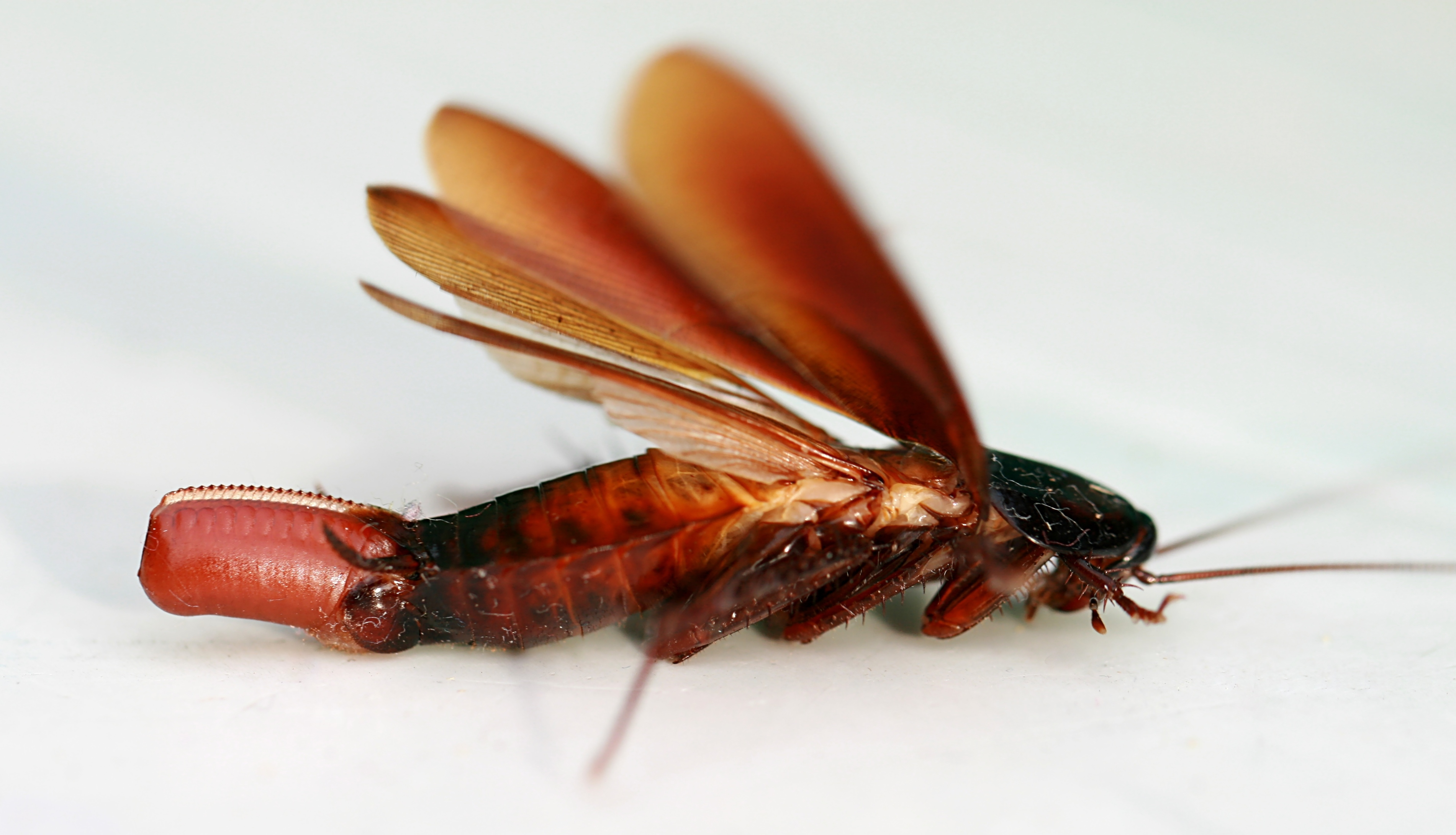
Female Validiblatta fuliginosa with ootheca

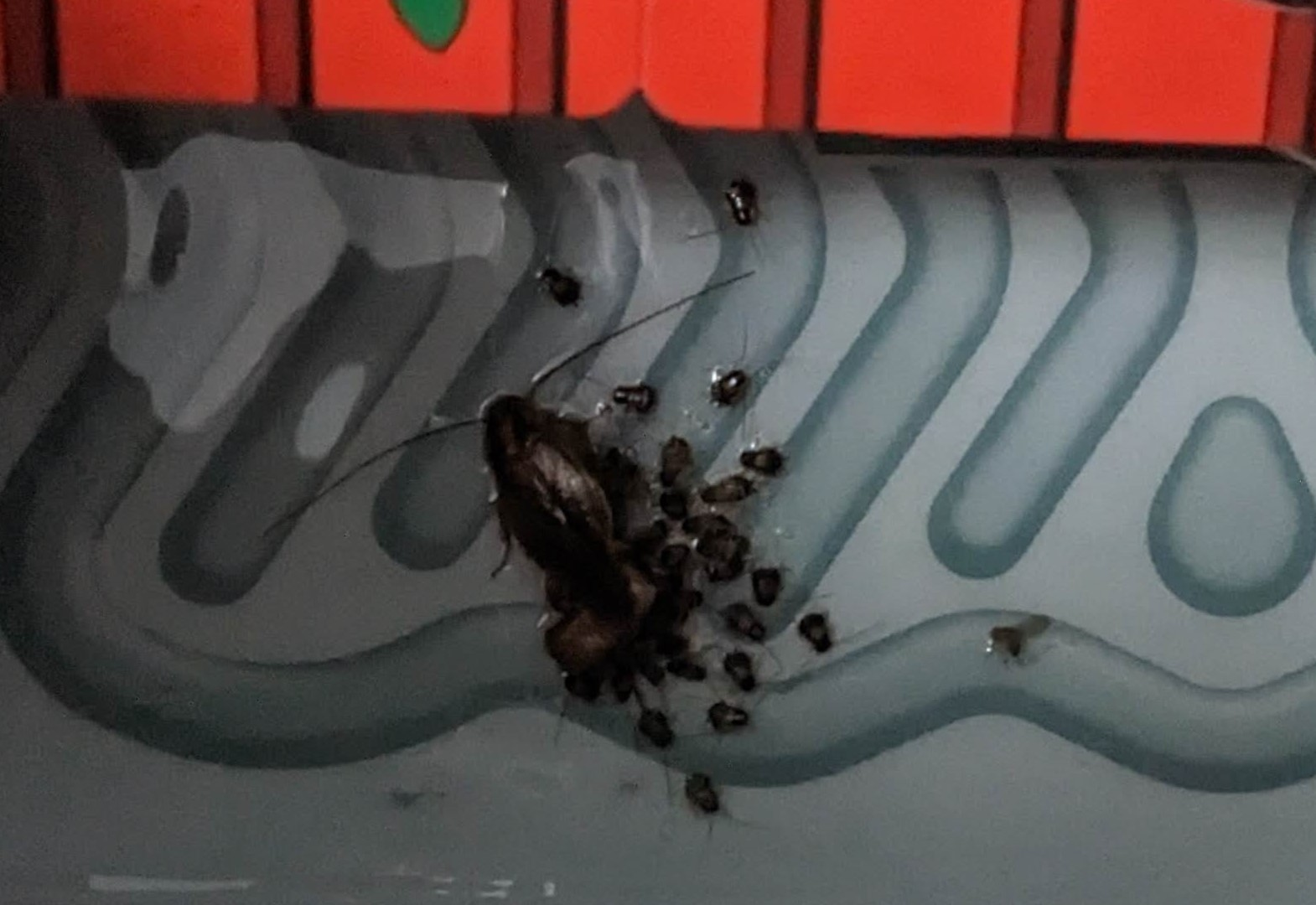
Captured adult and baby roaches around ootheca

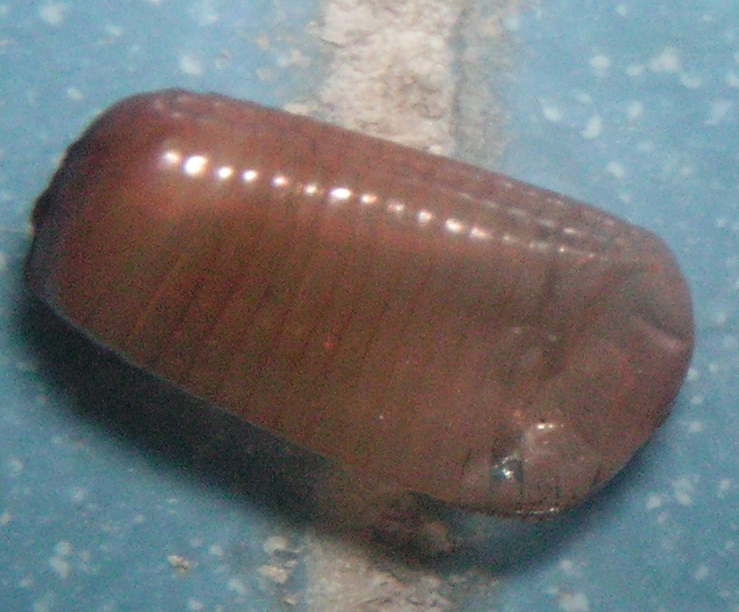
Empty ootheca

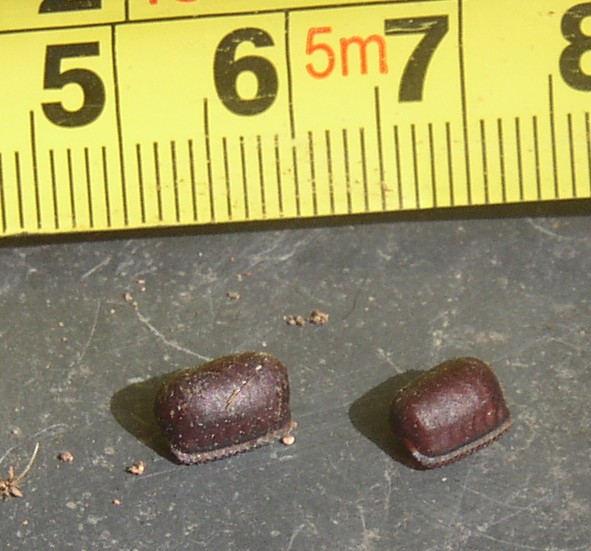
American cockroach oothecae

=== Parthenogenesis ===
When female American cockroaches (Periplaneta americana) are housed in groups, this close association promotes parthenogenic reproduction. Oothecae, a type of egg mass, are produced asexually. The parthenogenetic process by which eggs are produced in P. americana is automixis. During automixis, meiosis occurs, but instead of giving rise to haploid gametes as ordinarily occurs, diploid gametes are produced (probably by terminal fusion) that can then develop into female cockroaches.

=== Hardiness ===
Cockroaches are among the hardiest insects. Some species are capable of remaining active for a month without food and are able to survive on limited resources, such as the glue from the back of postage stamps. Some can go without air for 45 minutes. Japanese cockroach (Crescispina japonica) nymphs, which hibernate in cold winters, have survived twelve hours at −5 to −8 °C (23 to 18 °F) in laboratory experiments.

Experiments on decapitated specimens of several species of cockroach found a variety of behavioral functionality remained, including shock avoidance and escape behavior, although many insects other than cockroaches are also able to survive decapitation. Popular claims of the longevity of headless cockroaches do not appear to be based on published research. The severed head is able to survive and wave its antennae for several hours, or longer when refrigerated and given nutrients.

It is popularly suggested that cockroaches will "inherit the Earth" if humanity destroys itself in a nuclear war. While cockroaches do, indeed, have a much higher radiation resistance than vertebrates, with a lethal dose perhaps six to 15 times that for humans, they are not exceptionally radiation-resistant compared to other insects, such as the fruit fly.

The cockroach's ability to withstand radiation has been explained through the cell cycle. Cells are most vulnerable to the effects of radiation while they are dividing. A cockroach's cells divide only once each molting cycle (which is weekly, for the juvenile German cockroach). Since not all cockroaches would be molting at the same time, many would be unaffected by an acute burst of radiation, although prolonged radiation would still be harmful.

== Relationship with humans ==
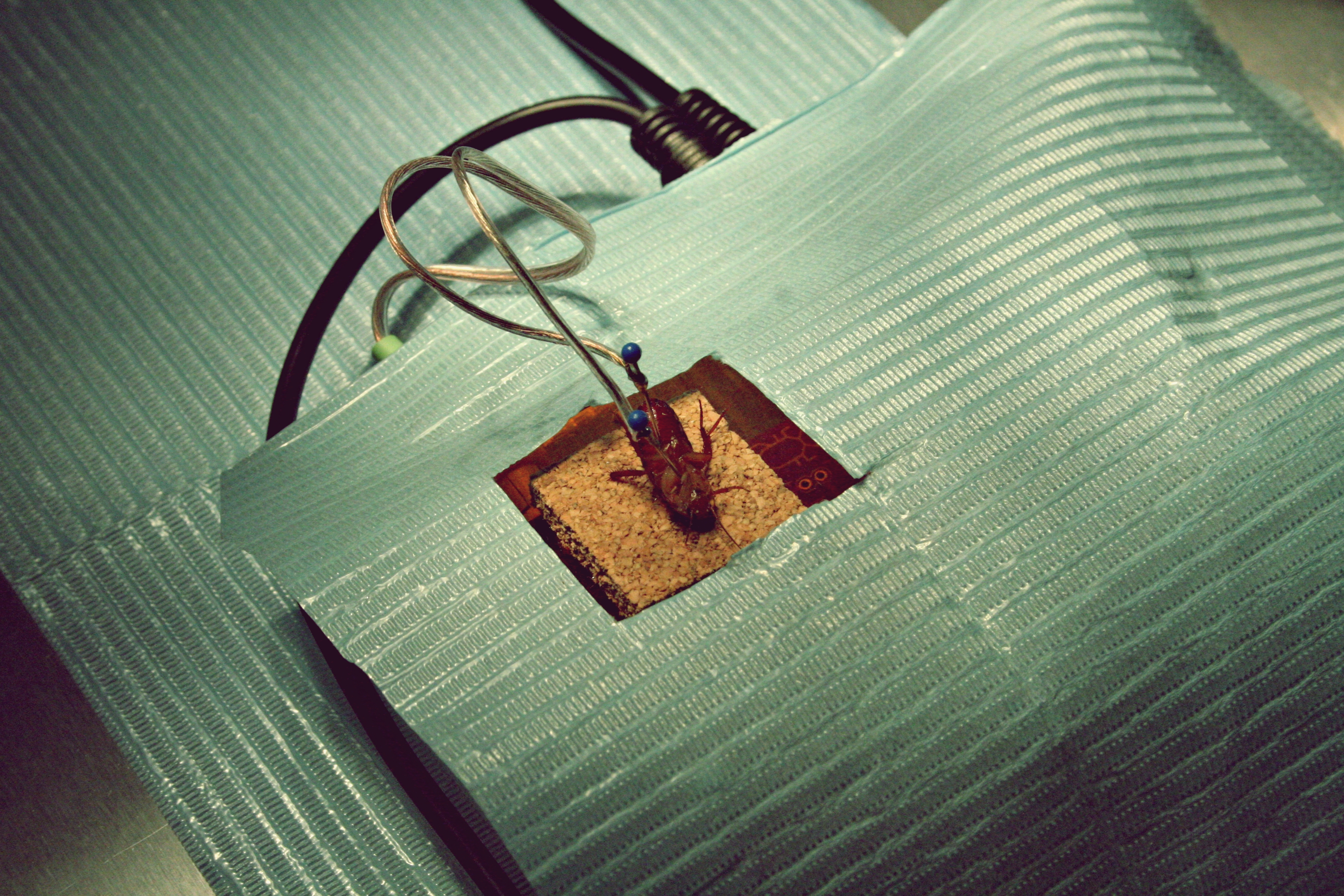
Cockroaches in research: Periplaneta americana in an electrophysiology experiment

Cockroach climbing on a wall in Japan, 2018

=== In research and education ===
Because of their ease of rearing and resilience, cockroaches have been used as insect models in the laboratory, particularly in the fields of neurobiology, reproductive physiology and social behavior. The cockroach is a convenient insect to study as it is large and simple to raise in a laboratory environment. This makes it suitable both for research and for school and undergraduate biology studies. It can be used in experiments on topics such as learning, sexual pheromones, spatial orientation, aggression, activity rhythms and the biological clock, and behavioral ecology. Research conducted in 2014 suggests that humans fear cockroaches the most, even more than mosquitoes, due to an evolutionary aversion.

=== As pests ===
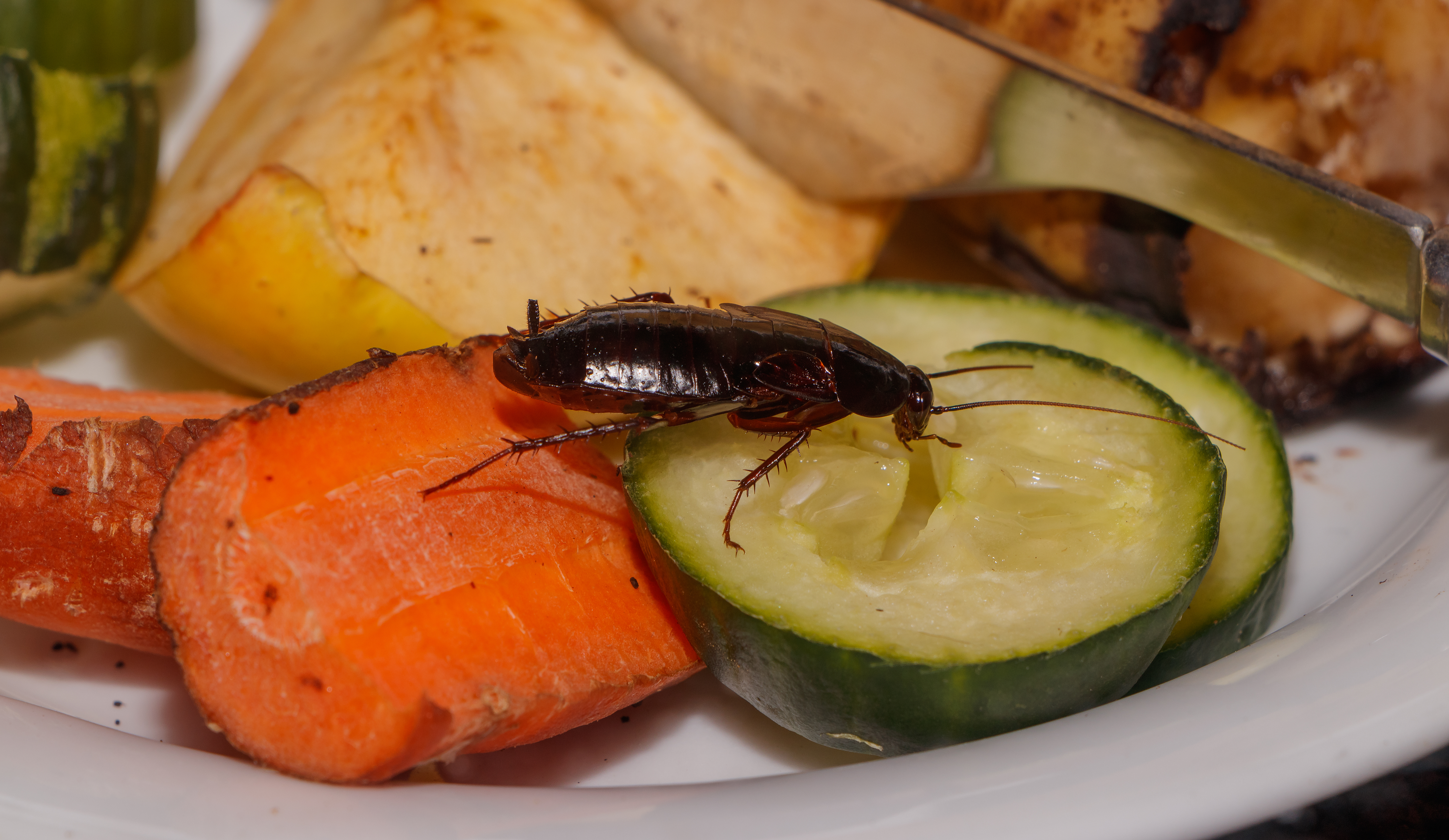
Oriental cockroach feeding on human food

The Blattodea include some thirty species of cockroaches associated with humans; these species are atypical of the thousands of species in the order. Of those thirty species, four are most commonly encountered as pests: the German cockroach (Blattella germanica), American cockroach (Periplaneta americana), oriental cockroach (Blatta orientalis), and brown-banded cockroach (Supella longipalpa).

Pest cockroaches feed on human and pet food and can leave an offensive odor. They can passively transport pathogenic microbes on their body surfaces, particularly in environments such as hospitals. Cockroaches are linked with allergic reactions in humans. One of the proteins that trigger allergic reactions is tropomyosin, which can cause cross-reactive allergy to dust mites and shrimp. These allergens are also linked with asthma. Some species of cockroach can live for up to a month without food, so just because no cockroaches are visible in a home does not mean that they are not there. Approximately 20–48% of homes with no visible sign of cockroaches have detectable cockroach allergens in dust.

==== Control ====
Many remedies have been tried in the search for control of the major pest species of cockroaches, which are resilient and fast-breeding. Household chemicals like sodium bicarbonate (baking soda) have been suggested, without evidence for their effectiveness. Garden herbs including bay, catnip, mint, cucumber, and garlic have been proposed as repellents. Poisoned bait containing hydramethylnon or fipronil, and boric acid powder is effective on adults. Baits with egg killers are also quite effective at reducing the cockroach population. Alternatively, insecticides containing deltamethrin or pyrethrin are very effective. In Singapore and Malaysia, taxi drivers use pandan leaves to repel cockroaches in their vehicles. Natural methods of cockroach control have been advanced by several published studies especially by Metarhizium robertsii (syn. M. anisopliae).

Some parasites and predators are effective for biological control of cockroaches. Parasitoidal wasps such as Ampulex wasps sting nerve ganglia in the cockroach's thorax, causing temporary paralysis and allowing the wasp to deliver an incapacitating sting into the cockroach's brain. The wasp clips the antennae with its mandibles and drinks some hemolymph before dragging the prey to a burrow, where an egg (rarely two) is laid on it. The wasp larva feeds on the subdued living cockroach. Another wasp considered to be a promising candidate for biological control is the ensign wasp Evania appendigaster, which attacks cockroach oothecae to lay a single egg inside. Ongoing research is still developing technologies allowing for the mass-rearing of these wasps for application releases. Widow spiders commonly prey on cockroaches.

Cockroaches can be trapped in a deep, smooth-walled jar baited with food inside, placed so that cockroaches can reach the opening, for example with a ramp of card or twigs on the outside. An inch (roughly two and a half centimeters) or so of water or stale beer (by itself a cockroach attractant) in the jar can be used to drown any insects thus captured. The method works well with the American cockroach, but less so with the German cockroach.

A study conducted by scientists at Purdue University concluded that the most common cockroaches in the US, Australia and Europe were able to develop a "cross resistance" to multiple types of pesticide. This contradicted previous understanding that the animals can develop resistance against one pesticide at a time. The scientists suggested that cockroaches will no longer be easily controlled using a diverse spectrum of chemical pesticides and that a mix of other means, such as traps and better sanitation, will need to be employed.

Researchers from Heriot-Watt University demonstrated that a power laser can, with high effectiveness, neutralise cockroaches in a home, and suggest it might be an alternative to pesticides.

=== As food ===
Although considered disgusting in Western culture, cockroaches are eaten in many places around the world. Whereas household pest cockroaches may carry bacteria and viruses, cockroaches bred under laboratory conditions can be used to prepare food. In Thailand and Mexico, the heads and legs are removed, and the remainder may be boiled, sautéed, grilled, dried, or diced. Frying makes the insect crispy with soft innards that taste like cottage cheese. Recipes from Taiwan also call for its use in omelets. It can be a feeder insect for pet reptiles.

=== Medicinal use ===
Cockroaches are raised in large quantities in China for the production of traditional medicine and cosmetics. There are about 100 cockroach farms in the country. Running a farm involves relatively low starting and operating costs due to how hardy and easy to process the insects are. Chinese and South Korean researchers are investigating cockroaches for treating baldness, AIDS, cancer, and as a dietary supplement.

=== Other uses ===
Recent experiments have shown that some species of cockroaches may be used as a plastic scavenger.

=== Conservation ===
While a small minority of cockroaches are associated with human habitats and viewed as repugnant by many people, a few species are of conservation concern. The Lord Howe Island wood-feeding cockroach (Panesthia lata) is listed as endangered by the New South Wales Scientific Committee, but the cockroach may be extinct on Lord Howe Island itself. The introduction of rats, the spread of Rhodes grass (Chloris gayana) and fires are possible reasons for their scarcity.

Two species are currently listed as endangered and critically endangered by the IUCN Red List: Delosia ornata and Nocticola gerlachi. Both cockroaches have a restricted distribution and are threatened by habitat loss and rising sea levels. Only 600 Delosia ornata adults and 300 nymphs are known to exist, and these are threatened by a hotel development. No action has been taken to save the two cockroach species, but protecting their natural habitats may prevent their extinction. In the former Soviet Union, cockroach populations have been declining at an alarming rate; this may be exaggerated, or the phenomenon may be temporary or cyclic. One species of roach, Simandoa conserfariam, is considered extinct in the wild.

== Cultural depictions ==
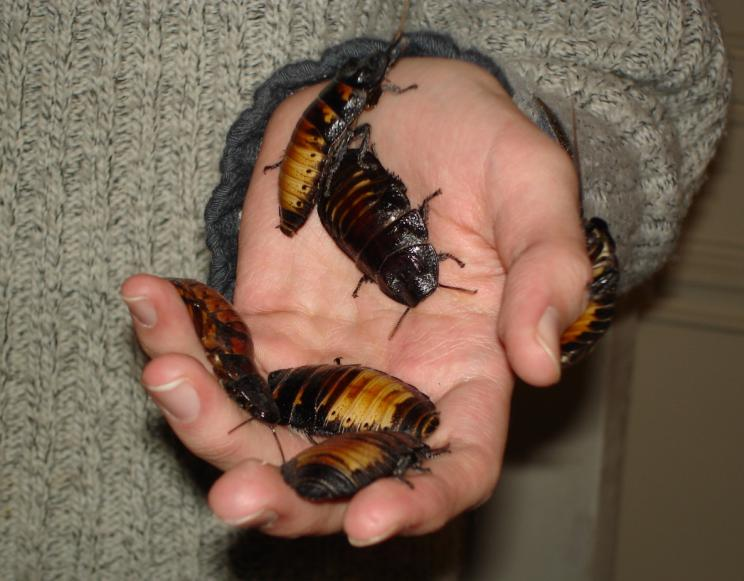
Madagascar hissing cockroaches kept as pets

Cockroaches were known and considered repellent but medicinally useful in Classical times. An insect named in Greek "σίλφη" (silphe) has been identified with the cockroach, though the scientific name Silpha refers to a genus of carrion beetles. It is mentioned by Aristotle, saying that it sheds its skin; it is described as foul-smelling in Aristophanes' play Peace; Euenus called it a pest of book collections, being "page-eating, destructive, black-bodied" in his Analect. Virgil named the cockroach "Lucifuga" ("one that avoids light"). Pliny the Elder recorded the use of "Blatta" in various medicines; he describes the insect as disgusting, and as seeking out dark corners to avoid the light. Dioscorides recorded the use of the "Silphe", ground up with oil, as a remedy for earache.

Lafcadio Hearn (1850–1904) asserted that "For tetanus cockroach tea is given. I do not know how many cockroaches go to make up the cup; but I find that faith in this remedy is strong among many of the American population of New Orleans. A poultice of boiled cockroaches is placed over the wound." He adds that cockroaches are eaten, fried with garlic, for indigestion.

Several cockroach species, such as Blaptica dubia, are raised as food for insectivorous pets. A few cockroach species are raised as pets, most commonly the giant Madagascar hissing cockroach, Gromphadorhina portentosa. Whilst the hissing cockroaches may be the most commonly kept species, there are many species that are kept by cockroach enthusiasts; there is even a specialist society: the Blattodea Culture Group (BCG), which was a thriving organisation for about 15 years although now appears to be dormant. The BCG provided a source of literature for people interested in rearing cockroaches, which was otherwise limited to either scientific papers, general insect books, or books covering a variety of exotic pets; in the absence of an inclusive book, one member published Introduction to Rearing Cockroaches, which still appears to be the only book dedicated to rearing cockroaches.

Cockroaches have been used for space tests. A cockroach given the name Nadezhda was sent into space by Russian scientists as part of a Foton-M mission, during which she mated, and produced 33 offspring after returning to Earth.

Because of their long association with humans, cockroaches are frequently referred to in popular culture. In Western culture, cockroaches are often depicted as dirty pests. In a 1750–1752 journal, Pehr Osbeck noted that cockroaches were frequently seen and found their way to the bakeries, after the sailing ship Gothenburg ran aground and was destroyed by rocks.

During the Rwandan genocide, Hutu militants referred to Tutsis with the pejorative "cockroach" in order to dehumanize them.

In India in May 2026, after the Chief Justice of India described unemployed youth as "cockroaches" and "parasites of society", the term was reclaimed by supporters of the Cockroach Janta Party, a satirical political party.

Donald Harington's satirical novel The Cockroaches of Stay More (Harcourt, 1989) imagines a community of "roosterroaches" in a mythical Ozark town where the insects are named after their human counterparts. Madonna has famously quoted, "I am a survivor. I am like a cockroach, you just can't get rid of me". An urban legend maintains that cockroaches are radiation-resistant, and thus would survive a nuclear war.

== See also ==
- Cockroach bite
- Blattodea
- American cockroach
- German cockroach
- Australian cockroach
- Madagascar hissing cockroach
