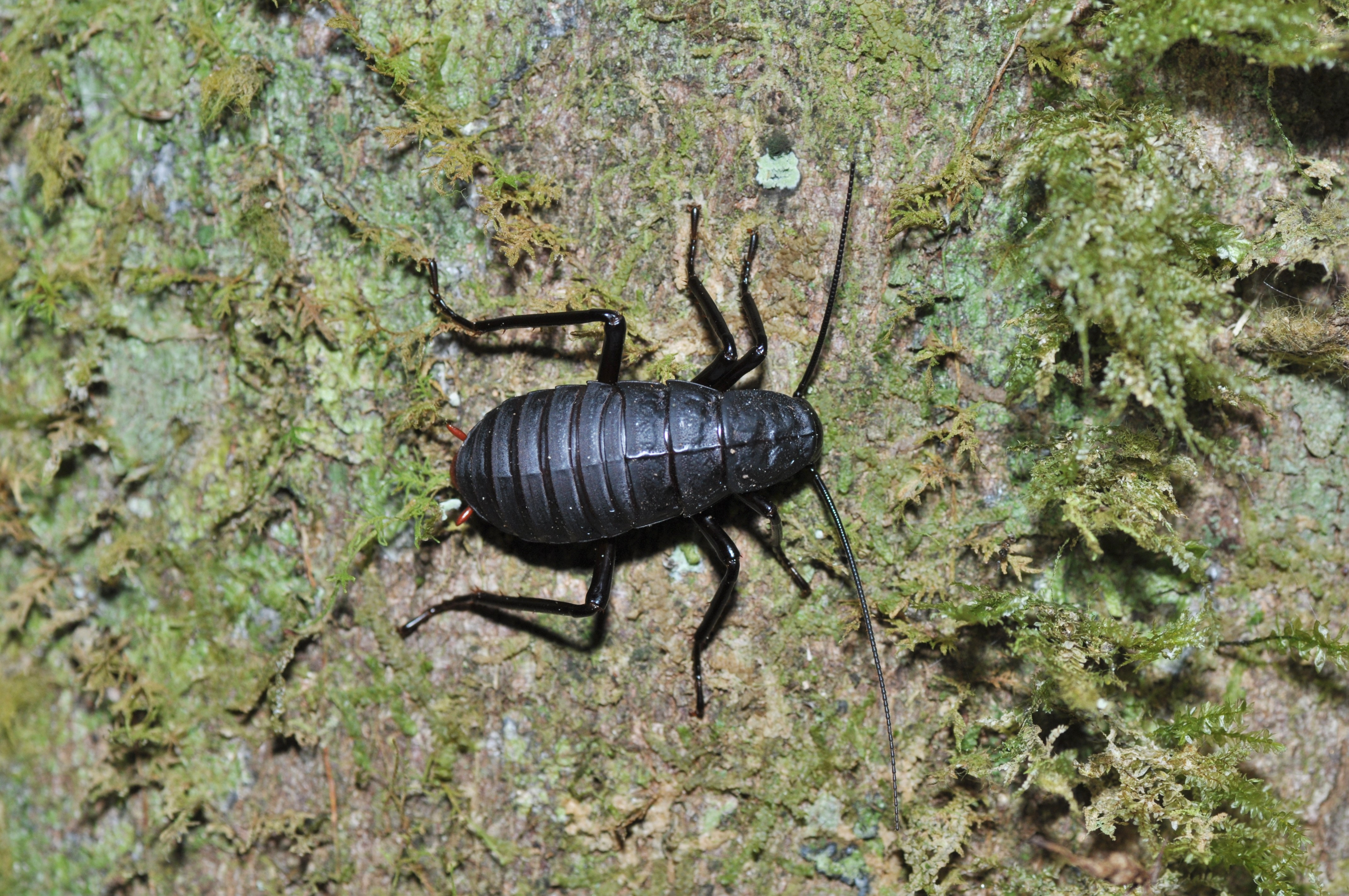
- Cockroach, Archiblatta beccarii

Scientific classification
- Kingdom: Animalia
- Phylum: Arthropoda
- Class: Insecta
- Order: Blattodea
- Superfamily: Blattoidea; Latreille, 1810

= Blattoidea =

Superfamily of cockroaches and termites

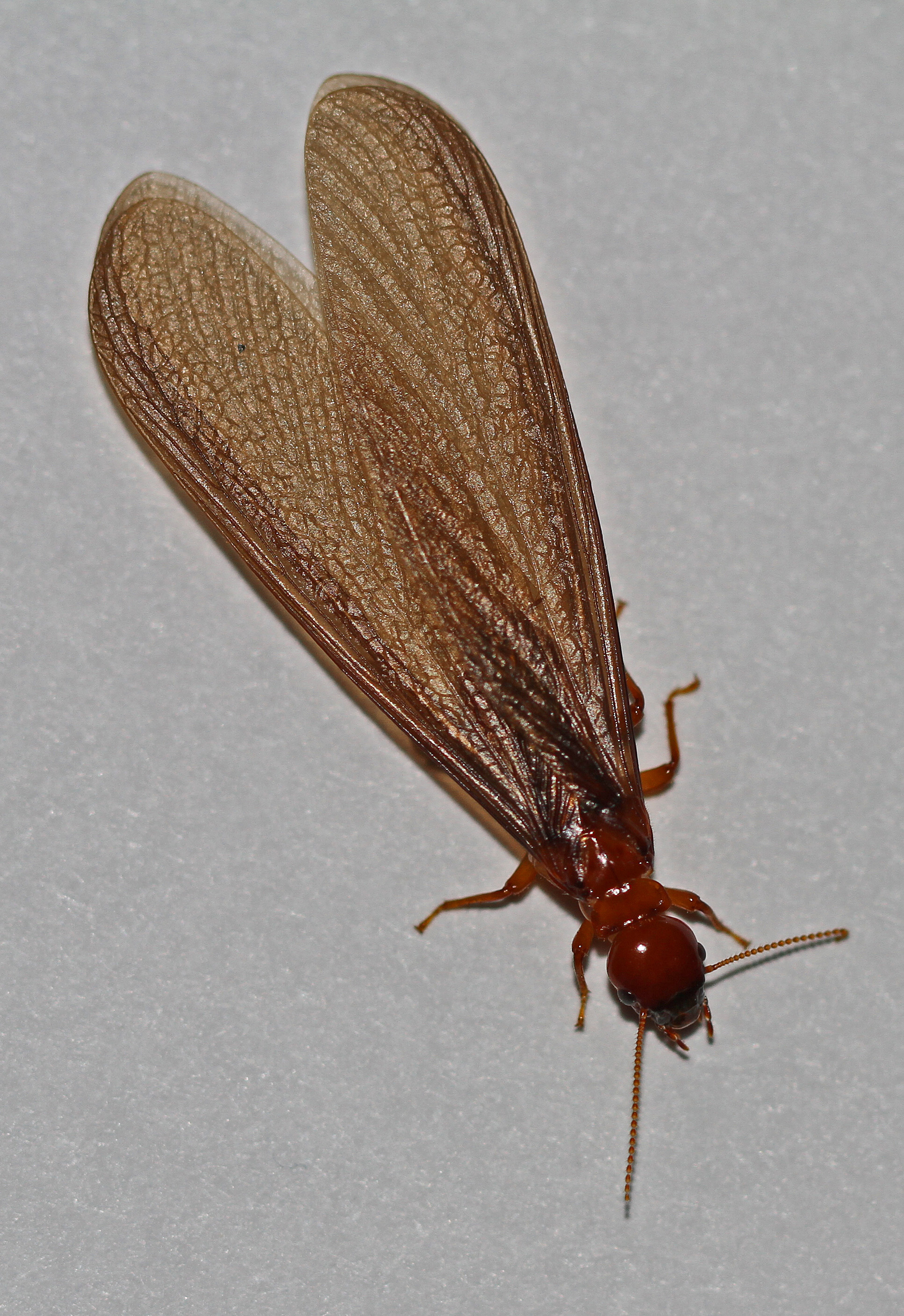
Pacific Coast Dampwood Termite, Zootermopsis angusticollis

Blattoidea is a superfamily of cockroaches and termites in the order Blattodea. There are about 17 families and more than 4,100 described species in Blattoidea.

The 12 families of termites are sometimes considered members of the suborder Isoptera, but recent phylogenetic analysis places them within the cockroach superfamily Blattoidea. Within Blattoidea, the termites are grouped under the epifamily Termitoidae.

The great coal deposits of the Carboniferous Period have been attributed in part to the lack of wood-consuming insects such as blattoids, which do not appear in the fossil record until the late Carboniferous.

== Families ==
These 17 families belong to the superfamily Blattoidea:

=== Cockroaches ===
Epifamily Blattoidae

- Anaplectidae Walker, 1868
- Blattidae Latreille, 1810
- Lamproblattidae McKittrick, 1964
- Tryonicidae McKittrick & Mackerras, 1965

Epifamily Cryptocercoidae

- Cryptocercidae Handlirsch, 1925 (brown-hooded cockroaches)

=== Termites ===
Epifamily Termitoidae

- Archotermopsidae Engel et al., 2009 (rottenwood termites)
- Hodotermitidae Desneux, 1904
- Kalotermitidae Froggart, 1897 (drywood termites)
- Mastotermitidae Desneux 1904
- Rhinotermitidae Froggart, 1897 (subterranean termites)
- Serritermitidae Holmgren, 1910
- Stolotermitidae Holmgren, 1910
- Stylotermitidae Holmgren & Holmgren, 1917
- Termitidae Latreille, 1802 (higher termites)
- † Archeorhinotermitidae Krishna, 2003
- † Cratomastotermitidae Engel et al., 2009
- † Termopsidae Holmgren, 1911
