= Juvenile hormone acid O-methyltransferase =

Enzyme

Identifiers
- EC no.: 2.1.1.325

Databases
- BRENDA: enzyme data
- ExPASy: NiceZyme view
- KEGG: enzyme entry
- MetaCyc: metabolic pathway
- Rhea: reactions
- PDB structures: RCSB PDB PDBe PDBsum
Search
- PMC: articles
- PubMed: articles
- NCBI: proteins

Juvenile hormone acid O-methyltransferase (JHAMT) is a ~33 kDa enzyme (the molecular mass is species-dependent) that catalyzes the conversion of inactive precursors of Juvenile hormones (JHs) to active JHs in the final stages of JH biosynthesis in the corpora allata of insects. More specifically, the enzyme catalyzes the transfer of a methyl group from S-adenosyl-L-methionine (SAM) to the carboxylate group of JH precursors.

== Structure ==
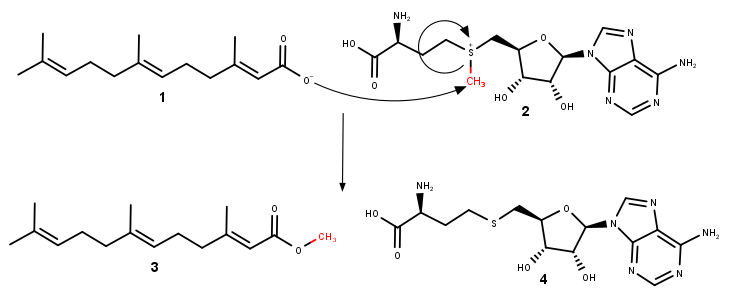
The reaction catalyzed by JHAMT is a canonical S_{N}2-like mechanism in which a methyl group is transferred from S-adenosyl-L-methionine (2) to farnesoate (1), generating methyl farneosate (3) and S-adenosyl-L-homocysteine (4).

While the crystal structure of JHAMT enzymes have not been solved, homology modeling and docking simulations with Aedes aegypti JHAMT (AaJHAMT) have revealed that enzyme interactions with SAM are very similar to other known SAM-dependent methyltransferase (SAM-MT) complexes. Further analysis of the predicted secondary structure of AaJHAMT shows a typical SAM-MT fold, with a six-stranded β-sheet with nine intercalated ⍺-helices. These docking studies show that the Asp-69 residue forms hydrogen bonds with two ribose hydroxyl groups of SAM; Asp-49 also forms a hydrogen bond through water with the NH_{3}^{+} moiety of SAM. Val-70 and Ile-95 form a hydrophobic pocket, which houses the adenine ring of SAM. Two additional residues, Gln-14 and Trp-120, hydrogen bond with the carboxyl group of either farnesoic acid (FA) or juvenile hormone acid III (JHA III) to structurally orient the molecule for catalysis. Ile-151, Ile-154, Tyr 155, Leu-158, Val-221 and Val-224 create the hydrophobic pocket for the carbon tail of JHA III and FA.

Generated structures of JHMAT derived from D. melanogaster, B. mori, T. castaneum, and A. gambiae identified Asp-41, Asp-69, Gln-14, Trp-120 and Ser-176 as the critical conserved residues for SAM and substrate recognition.

== Catalytic role ==
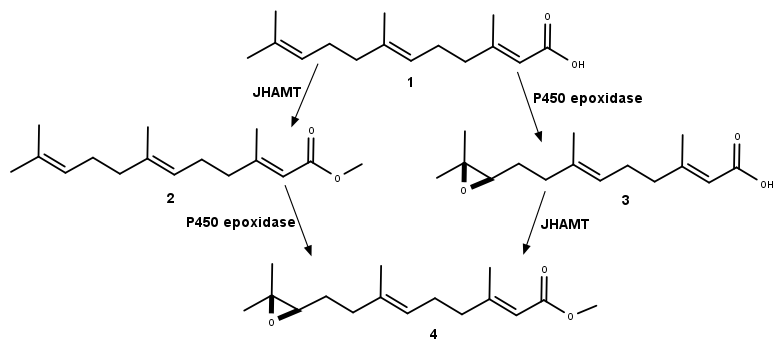
The biosynthesis of juvenile hormone III is dependent on insect taxonomy. In Lepidoptera, an epoxidation step occurs before the methylation step; in Orthoptera, Dictyoptera, Coleoptera, and Diptera methylation occurs first.

The enzyme catalyzes a putative S_{N}2 reaction, coordinating either FA or JHA III for facile backside nucleophilic attack on the methyl group of SAM. This reaction results in the formation of S-adenosyl homocysteine (SAH) and the corresponding methyl ester. Depending on the insect's taxonomy, JHMAT is either the last or second to last step in JH III synthesis. Insects in Orthoptera, Dictyoptera, Coleoptera, and Diptera first methylate farnesoic acid to methyl farneosate with JHAMT, followed by epoxidation mediated by P450 epoxidase to yield JH III. Insects of order Lepidoptera first perform an epoxidation by P450 epoxidase to convert farnesoic acid to JHA III, followed by JHAMT-dependent methylation to produce juvenile hormone III. The enzyme displays a higher affinity to JHA III compared to FA, although other enzymes do exhibit the opposite substrate affinity pattern.

Interestingly, JHAMT In Drosophila melanogaster (DmJHMAT) has been shown to have broad specificity for medium chain free fatty acids when the enzyme is recombinantly expressed in E. coli, converting them into fatty acid methyl esters (FAMEs). More specifically, DmJHAMT is active on fatty acids ranging in size from C12 to C16, exhibiting highest activity for lauric acid, a C12 fatty acid. As FAMEs are considered a component of biodiesel, this raises the possibility of manipulating DmJHAMT for biofuel synthesis. DmJHAMT shows no catalytic activity with respect to shorter chain C8 and C10 fatty acids.

== Biological function ==
Insect metamorphosis is a tightly regulated process that involves JHs and JHAMT. The function of JH in immature insects is to maintain the insect's nymph or larval state by preventing the expression of certain genes that activate insect maturation pathways. Once insects have reached their species-specific size, the corpora allata atrophies and JH production halts due to decreased JHAMT activity, lowering JH concentrations to allow metamorphosis to proceed. In the pupal stage of D. melanogaster and B. mori, a decrease in JH concentration correlates with decreased levels of JHAMT mRNA. Furthermore, JHAMT gene suppression is thought to be critical in larval-pupal metamorphosis in Tribolium castaneum.

In D. melanogaster, DmJHMAT is encoded by the CG17330/DmJHAMT gene, and is very specifically expressed in the corpus allatum. Experiments have shown that an overexpression of CG17330/DmJHAMT leads to pupal lethality and a misorientation of male genitalia in D. melanogaster, suggesting that proper temporal regulation of this gene is critical for Drosophila development.

Apis mellifera are also known to encode a similar JHAMT protein (AmJHAMT). The cDNA was found to be 1253bp long, and encodes a 278-aa protein that shares 32-36% identity with other known JHAMTs. During periods of caste development, queen larvae contained significantly higher levels of AmJHAMT mRNA and protein than worker larvae, suggesting that the protein has a significant role in honey bee caste differentiation.
