= Cratomastotermes =

Cratomastotermes Temporal range: Aptian–Albian

Scientific classification
- Domain: Eukaryota
- Kingdom: Animalia
- Phylum: Arthropoda
- Class: Insecta
- Order: Blattodea
- Infraorder: Isoptera
- Family: †Cratomastotermitidae
- Genus: †Cratomastotermes; Bechly, 2007
- Species: †C. wolfschwenningeri

Binomial name
- †Cratomastotermes wolfschwenningeri Bechly, 2007

Extinct genus of termites

Cratomastotermes is an extinct genus of termites in the family Cratomastotermitidae, the sole genus of the family. There is one described species in Cratomastotermes, C. wolfschwenningeri.
