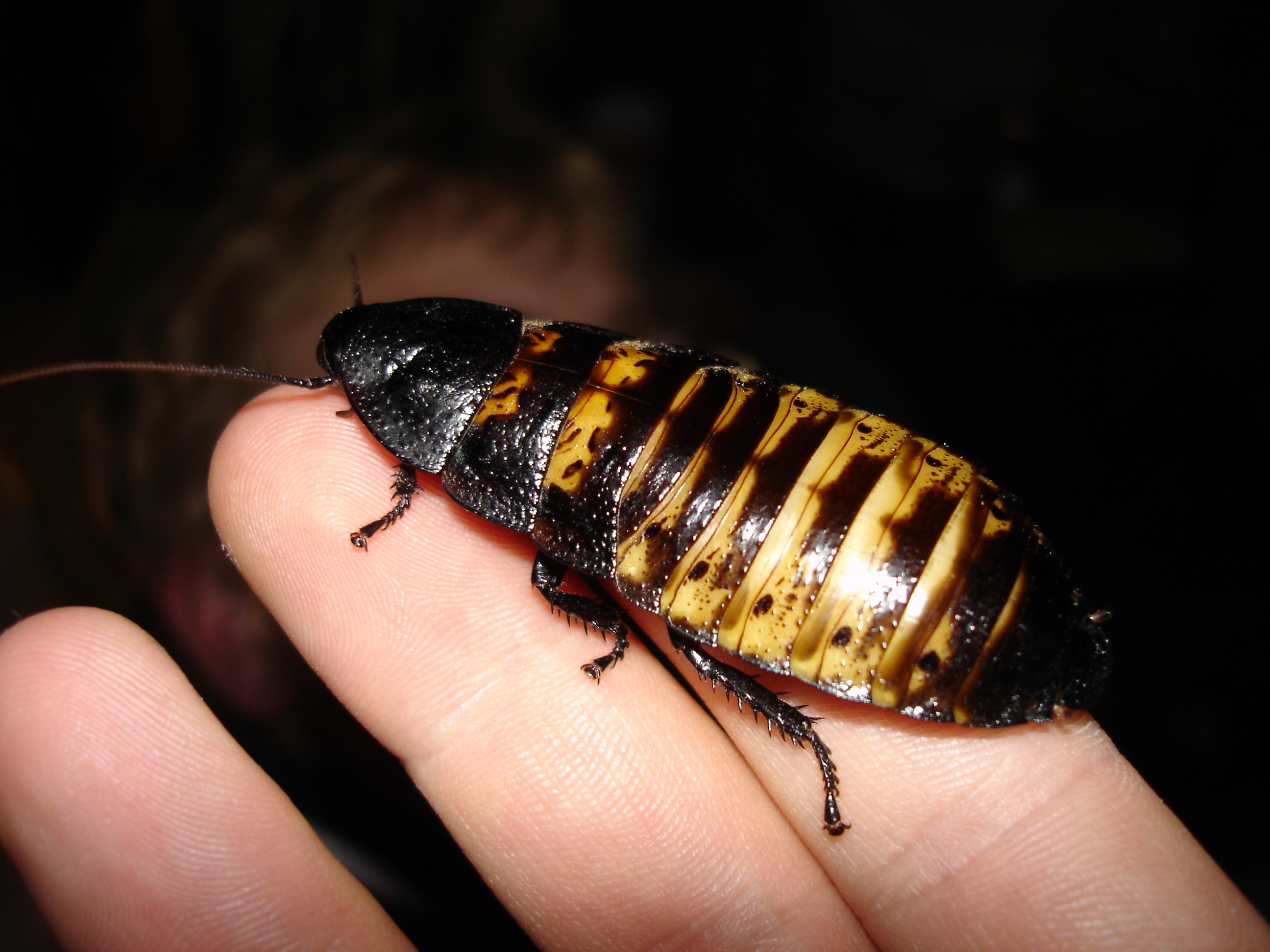
- Gromphadorhina portentosa (Malagasy hissing cockroach)

Scientific classification
- Kingdom: Animalia
- Phylum: Arthropoda
- Clade: Pancrustacea
- Class: Insecta
- Order: Blattodea
- Superfamily: Blaberoidea; Saussure, 1864

= Blaberoidea =

- Rochaina mexicana

Superfamily of cockroaches

Blaberoidea is a large insect superfamily in the cockroach order Blattodea, found worldwide but mainly inhabiting the Afrotropical, Indo-Malayan, and Neotropical realms. Notable members include the giant cockroaches (Blaberidae) which includes the hissing cockroaches, as well as the wood cockroaches (Ectobiidae) which includes the pest species Blatella germanica, the German cockroach. Many species are brachypterous or apterous, being unable to fly in either the females or all individuals. The largest species of cockroaches (in both dimension and mass) belong to this superfamily.

== Taxonomy ==
Blaberoidea contains the following families:

- Epifamily Orkrasomeria Evangelista, Wipfler & Béthoux, 2020
  - Blaberidae
  - Blattellidae (may be considered as the subfamily Blattellinae of Ectobiidae)
  - Nyctiboridae
- Ectobiidae
- Pseudophyllodromiidae

The following cladogram is based on a 2023 genetic analysis of cockroaches:

- Blattoidea
- - Corydioidea
  - Blaberoidea
    - Ectobiidae
    - - Pseudophyllodromiidae
      - - Nyctiboridae
        - - Blattellidae
          - Blaberidae
