= Archeorhinotermes =

Archeorhinotermes Temporal range: Cenomanian–Turonian

Scientific classification
- Domain: Eukaryota
- Kingdom: Animalia
- Phylum: Arthropoda
- Class: Insecta
- Order: Blattodea
- Family: †Archeorhinotermitidae
- Genus: †Archeorhinotermes; Krishna & Grimaldi, 2003
- Species: †A. rossi

Binomial name
- †Archeorhinotermes rossi Krishna & Grimaldi, 2003

Extinct genus of termites

Archeorhinotermes is an extinct genus of termites in the family Archeorhinotermitidae, and is the sole genus of the family. There is one described species in Archeorhinotermes, A. rossi. It was discovered in Burmese amber.
