= Manipulation =

Manipulation may refer to:

- Manipulation (psychology) - acts intended to influence or control someone in a underhanded or subtle way
- Crowd manipulation - use of crowd psychology to direct the behavior of a crowd toward a specific action
- Internet manipulation - co-opting of digital technology (algorithms, automated scripts) for commercial, social or political purpose
- Media manipulation - creating an image or argument in the news that favors partisan interests
- Market manipulation - interfering with the free and fair operation of financial markets.

Sciences

- Object manipulation
- Robotic manipulation
- Manipulator (device)

Medical

- Medical therapy manipulation
- Joint manipulation
- Spinal manipulation

Data

- Data manipulation
- Bit manipulation
- Photo manipulation

Other

- Card manipulation
- Coin manipulation
- Hat manipulation

== Mathematics and science ==
- Manipulation of atoms by optical field
- Manipulative (mathematics education)
- Symbolic Manipulation Program
- Manipulator (insect), an extinct predatory cockroach

== In entertainment ==
- Manipulation (film), a 1991 British animated short film
- Manipulated (album), a remix album by Gravity Kills
- Manipulator (The Fall of Troy album), 2007
- Manipulator (EP), an EP by Arsenal
- Manipulator (Ty Segall album), 2014
