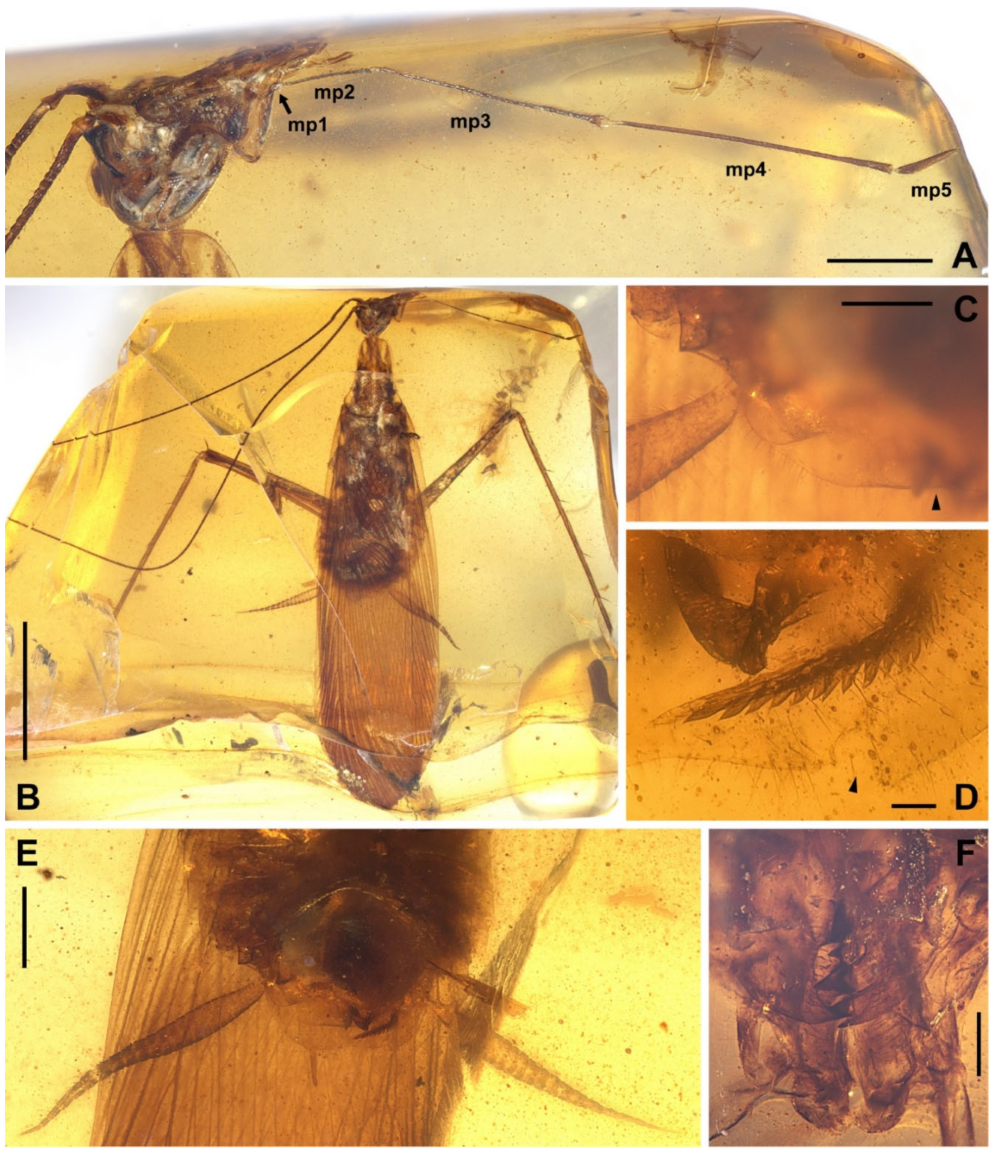
- Fossil specimen
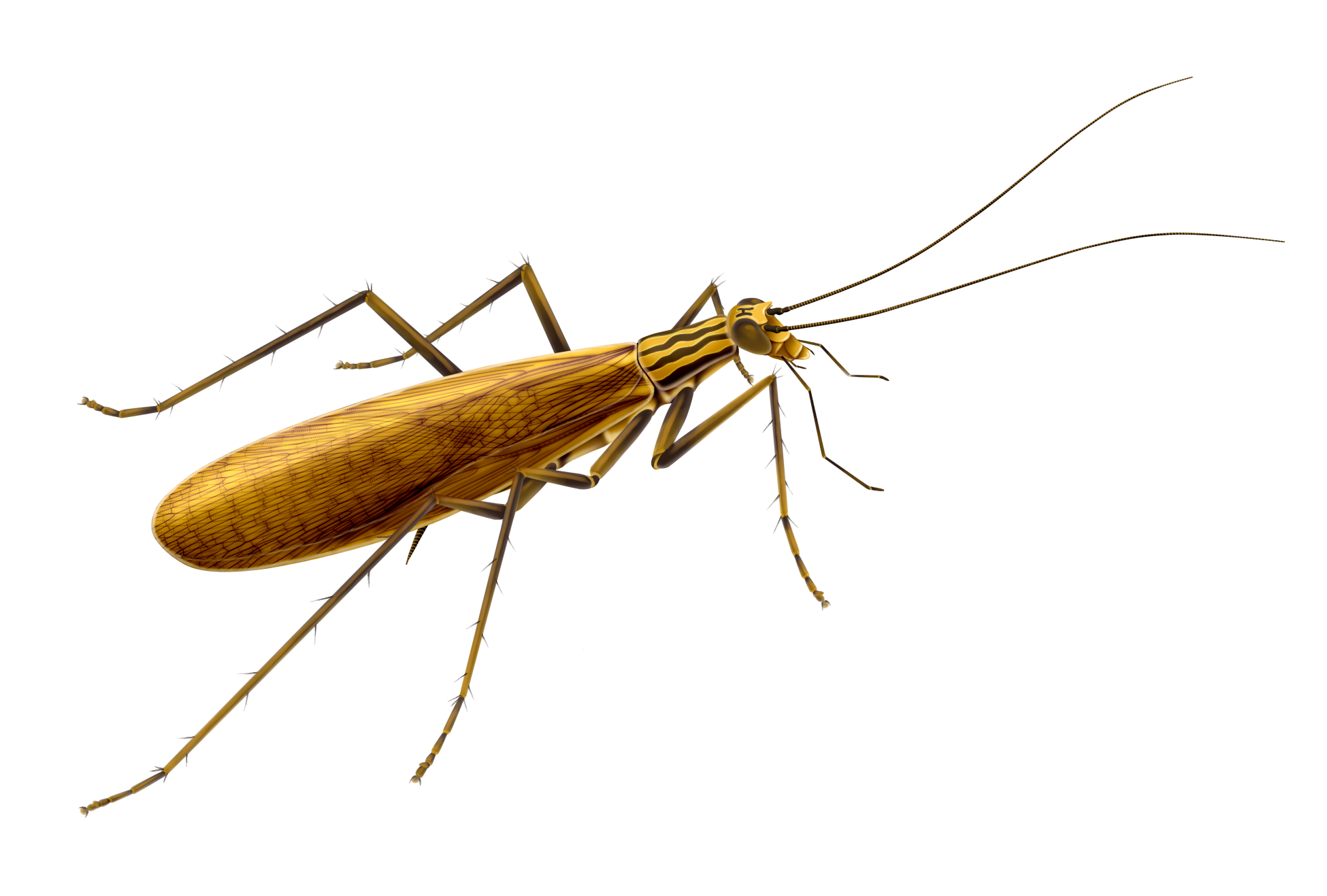
- Reconstruction

Scientific classification
- Kingdom: Animalia
- Phylum: Arthropoda
- Class: Insecta
- Order: Blattodea
- Superfamily: Corydioidea
- Family: †Manipulatoridae; Vršanský & Bechly 2015
- Genus: †Manipulator; Vršanský & Bechly 2015

Type species
- Manipulator modificaputis Vršanský & Bechly 2015

Other species
- Manipulator olim Vršanský, 2024

= Manipulator (insect) =

Manipulator Temporal range: Kimmeridgian–Cenomanian

Extinct genus of cockroaches

Manipulator is an extinct cockroach genus including species which lived from the Late Jurassic to the Late Cretaceous. The type species is Manipulator modificaputis, described on the basis of the holotype specimen which is fossilized in a 100-million-year-old piece of Burmese amber, found in a quarry of volcanoclastic mudstone (a sedimentary rock) at Noije Bum in the Hukawng Valley in Myanmar. M. modificaputis was described by Peter Vršanský, of the Geological Institute SAS of Bratislava, and by Günter Bechly, of the Staatliches Museum für Naturkunde in Stuttgart.

The cockroach was found to have an elongated neck, a freely rotating head and unexpectedly long legs, which are indicative of a predatory lifestyle. However, as of 2022, it is thought that M. modificaputis tended to live around and feed on flowers. In addition, this insect has some characteristics superficially similar to mantises, however differ from other many characters. The insect body is 9.3 millimetres (0.37 in) long with 14.7 millimetres (0.58 in) long forewings for male and 10.9 millimetres (0.43 in) body length, 13.4 millimetres (0.53 in) forewing length for female.

The authors erected a new family, Manipulatoridae, after examining the specimen on the basis of "the unique habitus with numerous autapomorphies along with several plesiomorphies." Other specimens including that of a juvenile were discovered from the Myanmar amber mines and described in 2022.

This species was found along with dozens of other extinct species of insects fully preserved in amber, making Noije Bum in the Hukawng Valley region one of the most important regions for amber fossils containing fully preserved insects.

This species belonged to the invertebrate fauna of the ancient amber forest of the Myanmar region.

Vršanský (2024) described another species belonging to the genus Manipulator, Manipulator olim from the Upper Jurassic (Kimmeridgian) Karabastau Formation (Kazakhstan).

Manipulator was the only member of the family Manipulatoridae until 2022, when the related genus Manipulatoides was described from the same deposit as the type species.
