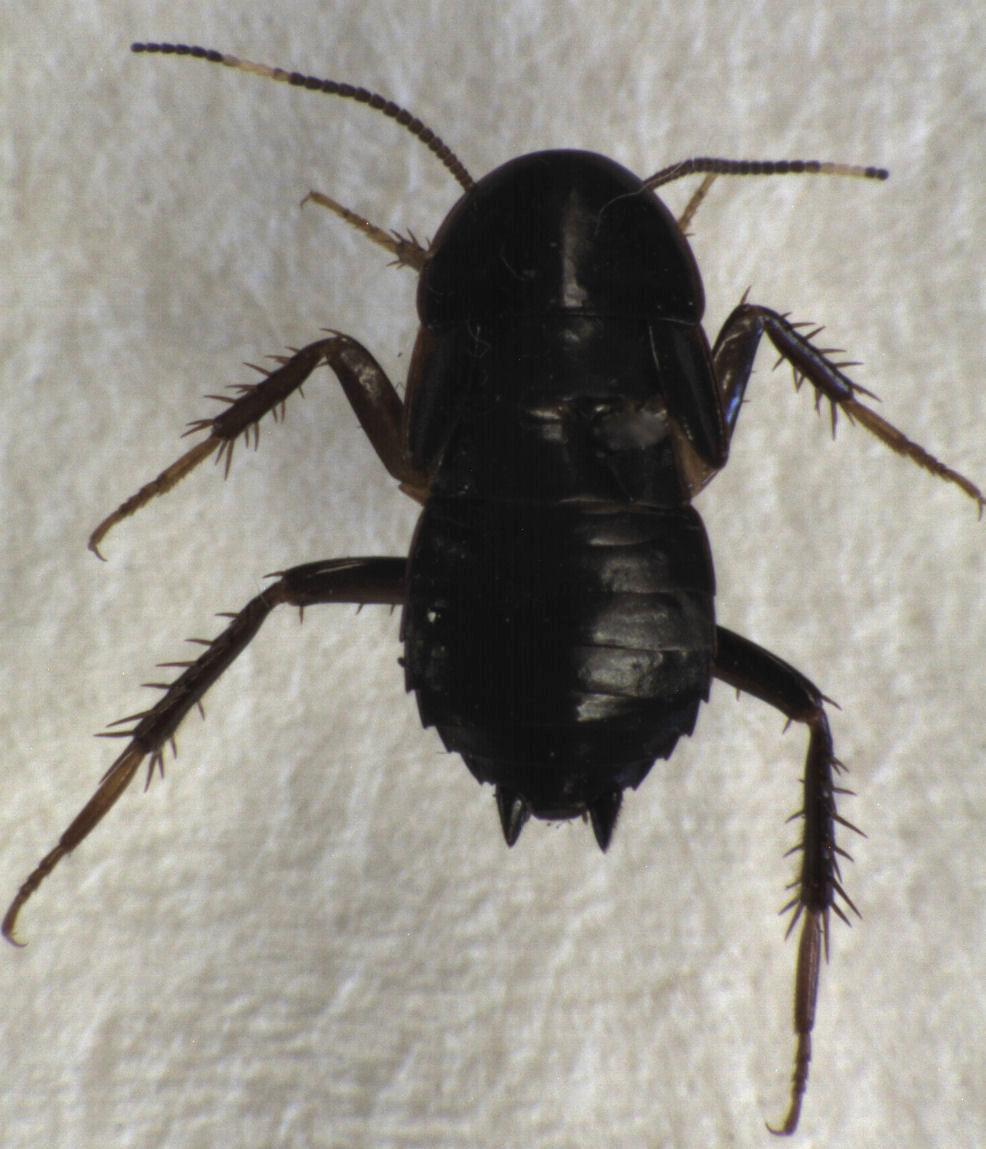
- Tryonicus parvus (male)

Scientific classification
- Kingdom: Animalia
- Phylum: Arthropoda
- Clade: Pancrustacea
- Class: Insecta
- Order: Blattodea
- Superfamily: Blattoidea
- Epifamily: Blattoidae
- Family: Tryonicidae

Genera
- Lauraesilpha; Tryonicus

= Tryonicidae =

Family of cockroaches

The Tryonicidae are a family of cockroaches.

== Biodiversity and distribution ==
Two genera containing 17 species are currently confirmed as belonging to this family, including the South American housebug.

Table 1: Number of species of Tryonicidae in each region in which it is present (A=adventive, E=endemic, I=indigenous)

	Australia	New Caledonia	New Zealand
Lauraesilpha		11E	
Tryonicus	3E	3E	1A

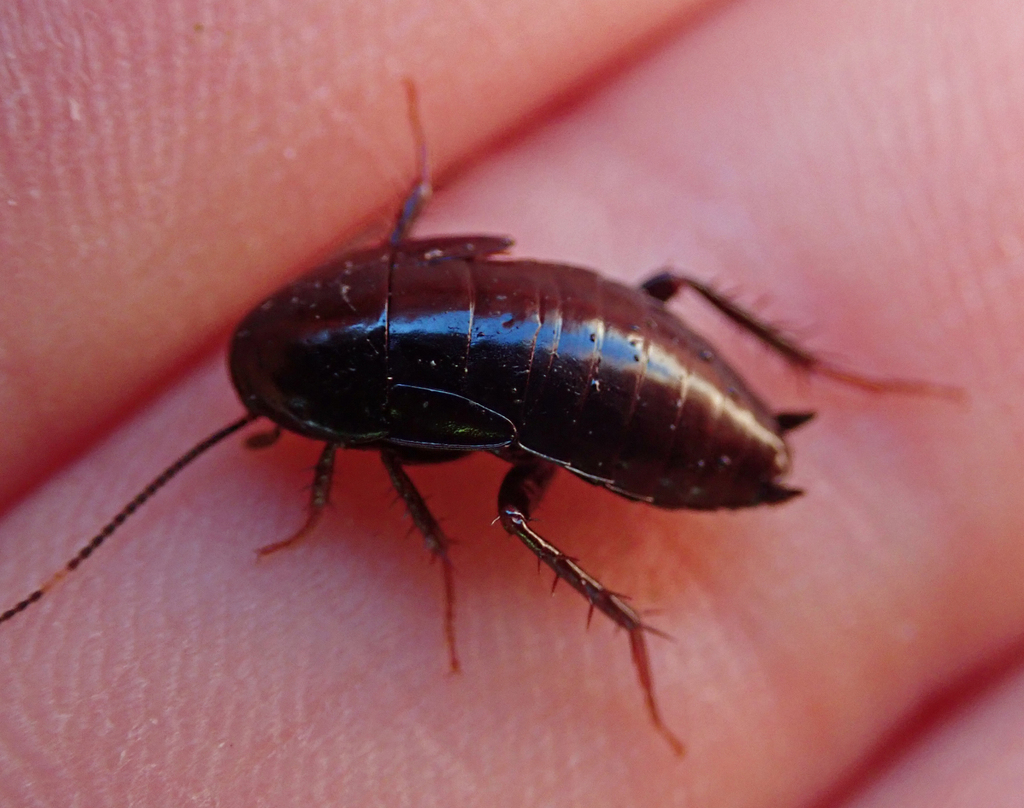
A Tryonicus parvus found in Auckland, New Zealand. They are common under logs and planks lying in gumland scrub. They can emit an unpleasant smell when handled.

=== Notes ===
- Beccaloni & Eggleton's (2011) figures of '10 genera, 47 species' presumably does not take into account Murienne's (2009) publication (they do not cite it)
- According to Murienne (2009: 49), the tribe Methanini certainly belongs to the Blattidae: Polyzosteriinae, as probably does the group of New Caledonian endemic genera Angustonicus, Pallidionicus, Pellucidonicus, Punctulonicus, and Rothisilpha
- A report has been published of an unidentified endemic "tryonicine" from New Zealand, in addition to the adventive Tryonicus parvus, but details are too sketchy at present to accept this record.
