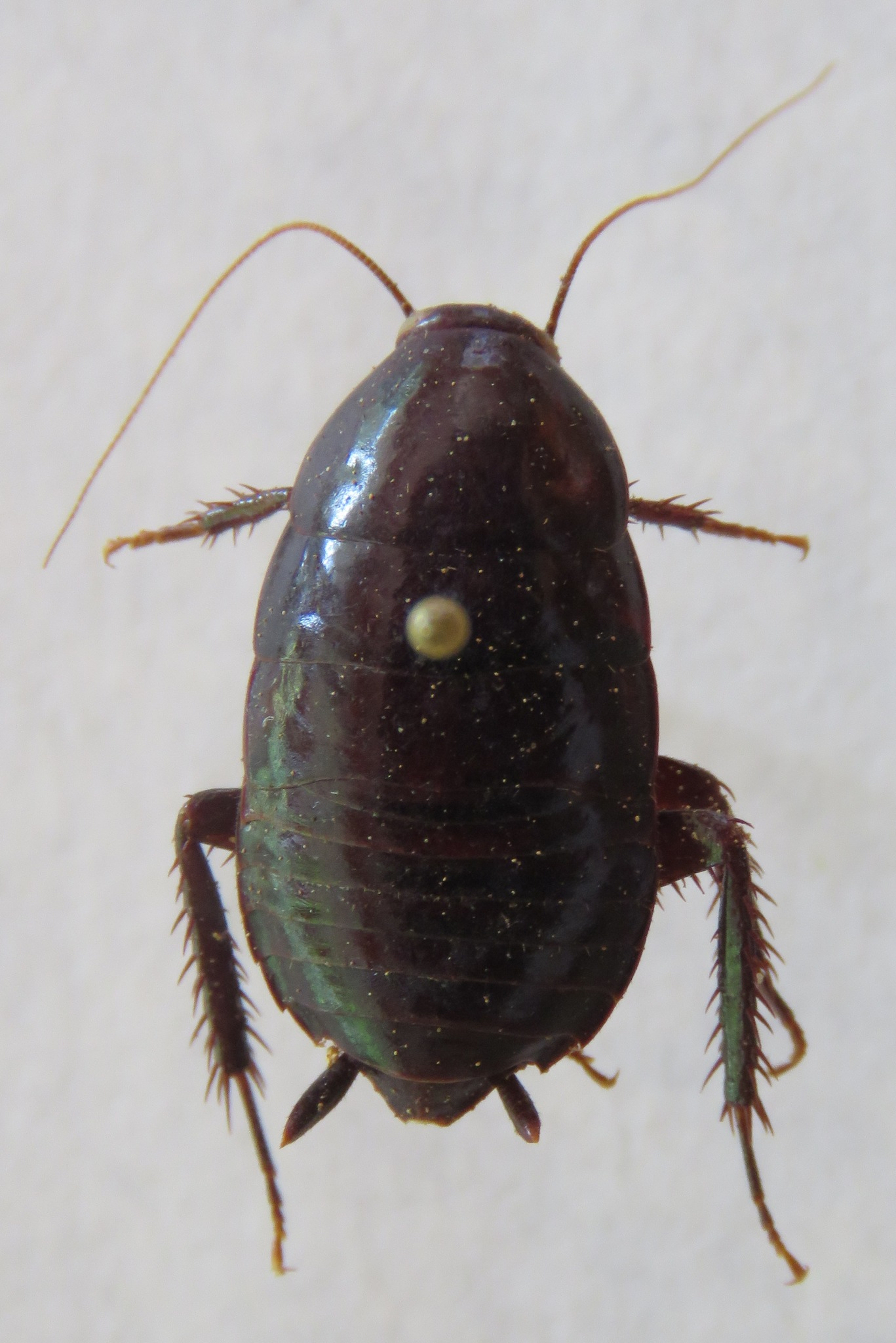
- Lamproblatta albipalpus

Scientific classification
- Kingdom: Animalia
- Phylum: Arthropoda
- Class: Insecta
- Order: Blattodea
- Superfamily: Blattoidea
- Epifamily: Blattoidae
- Family: Lamproblattidae; McKittrick, 1964

Genera
- Eurycanthablatta Fritzsche & Zompro, 2008; Lamproblatta Hebard, 1919; Lamproglandifera Roth, 2003

= Lamproblattidae =

Family of cockroaches

Lamproblattidae is a small family of South and Central American cockroaches in the order Blattodea. It consists of three genera and 10 species:

- Eurycanthablatta Fritzsche & Zompro, 2008

- E. pugionata Fritzsche & Zompro, 2008: Brazil

- Lamproblatta Hebard, 1919

- L. albipalpus Hebard, 1919: Panama; Colombia; Brazil (Amapá)
- L. ancistroides Rehn, 1930: Colombia; Venezuela
- L. flavomaculata Princis, 1946: Colombia
- L. gorgonis Rehn, 1930: Colombia (Gorgona Island)
- L. meridionalis (Bruner, 1906): Republic of Trinidad and Tobago (Trinidad)
- L. mimetes Rehn, 1930: Brazil (Mato Grosso)
- L. romani Rehn, 1930: Brazil (Amazonas)
- L. zamorensis (Giglio-Tos, 1898): Ecuador; Peru

- Lamproglandifera Roth, 2003

- L. flavoglandis Roth, 2003: Brazil
