= Serritermitidae =

Scientific classification
- Kingdom: Animalia
- Phylum: Arthropoda
- Clade: Pancrustacea
- Class: Insecta
- Order: Blattodea
- Infraorder: Isoptera
- Parvorder: Euisoptera
- Microrder: Icoisoptera
- Nanorder: Neoisoptera
- Family: Serritermitidae; Holmgren, 1910

Family of termites

Serritermitidae is a family of termites belonging to the infraorder Isoptera in the order Blattodea. The family includes only a few species, which live in South America.

== Appearance ==
These termites are much like the family Rhinotermitidae, to which they are related. The soldiers' jaws are sharply toothed on the inner side. At all stages, the mandible is strikingly sharp. The flying stages have fore wings with only one longitudinal vein, slightly ahead of the center of the wing. From this it affects numerous oblique veins to the wing trailing edge.

== Habits ==
They are located in or on the ground. Their mode of life resembles the family Rhinotermitidae. Serritermes serrifer lives in the walls of the tufts of termites in the genus Cornitermes (Termitidae).

== Prevalence ==
S. serresi is known from the states of Minas Gerais and Mato Grosso, Brazil. The two Glossotermes species are known only from the Amazon region of Brazil.
