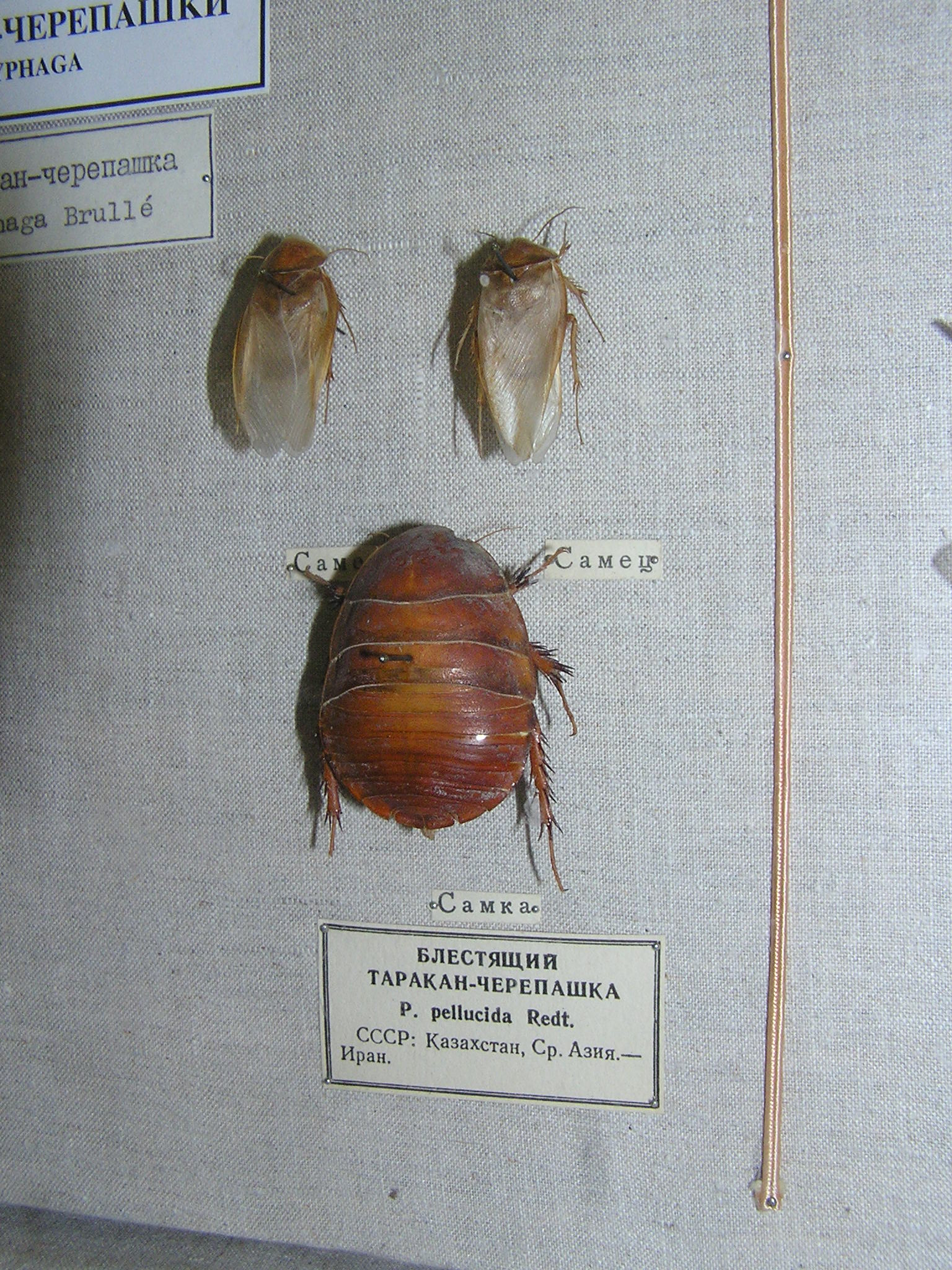
- Polyphaga pellucida in the Saint Petersburg Zoological Museum

Scientific classification
- Kingdom: Animalia
- Phylum: Arthropoda
- Class: Insecta
- Order: Blattodea
- Superfamily: Corydioidea

= Corydioidea =

Corydioidea Temporal range: Late Jurassic–Present

Superfamily of cockroaches

Corydioidea is a superfamily of insects in the order Blattodea. It contains two extant families, Corydiidae and Nocticolidae, comprising about fifty genera and two hundred and fifty species, along with the extinct families Liberiblattinidae and Manipulatoridae. Members of this superfamily are found worldwide, mostly in hot, arid habitats.
