= List of endangered insects =

- Extinct in the wild (EW): 1 species
- Critically endangered (CR): 520 species
- Endangered (EN): 1,132 species
- Vulnerable (VU): 1,082 species
- Near threatened (NT, LR/cd): 897 species
- Least concern (LC): 6,802 species
- Data deficient (DD): 3,255 species
Insect species (IUCN, 2025-2)
- 13,696 extant species have been evaluated
- 10,441 of those are fully assessed (Note: excludes data deficient evaluations.)
- 7,699 are not threatened at present
- 2,742 to 5,997 are threatened (Note: Threatened comprises CR, EN and VU. Upper estimate additionally includes DD.)
- 59 to 175 are extinct or extinct in the wild:
  - 58 extinct (EX) species (Note: Chart omits extinct (EX) species)
  - 1 extinct in the wild (EW)
  - 116 possibly extinct [CR(PE)]
  - 0 possibly extinct in the wild [CR(PEW)]

Endangered (EN) species are considered to be facing a very high risk of extinction inside.

In July 2017, the International Union for Conservation of Nature (IUCN) listed 343 endangered insect species. Of all evaluated insect species, 5.7% are listed as endangered. The IUCN also lists 21 insect subspecies as endangered.

No subpopulations of insects have been evaluated by the IUCN.

For a species to be considered endangered by the IUCN it must meet certain quantitative criteria which are designed to classify taxa facing "a very high risk of extinction". An even higher risk is faced by critically endangered species, which meet the quantitative criteria for endangered species. Critically endangered insects are listed separately. There are 538 insect species which are endangered or critically endangered.

Additionally 1702 insect species (28% of those evaluated) are listed as data deficient, meaning there is insufficient information for a full assessment of conservation status. As these species typically have small distributions and/or populations, they are intrinsically likely to be threatened, according to the IUCN. While the category of data deficient indicates that no assessment of extinction risk has been made for the taxa, the IUCN notes that it may be appropriate to give them "the same degree of attention as threatened taxa, at least until their status can be assessed".

This is a complete list of endangered insect species and subspecies as evaluated by the IUCN.

== Blattodea ==
- Hololeptoblatta minor
- Miriamrothschildia aldabrensis
- Miriamrothschildia biplagiata
- Miriamrothschildia mahensis
- Gerlach's cockroach (Nocticola gerlachi)
- Theganopteryx lunulata
- Theganopteryx minuta

== Orthoptera ==
There are 91 species and two subspecies in the order Orthoptera assessed as endangered.

=== Lentulids ===
- Slender restio grasshopper (Betiscoides meridionalis)
- Small restio grasshopper (Betiscoides parva)
- Robust restio grasshopper (Betiscoides sjostedti)

=== Tetrigids ===
- Amphinotus nymphula
- Amphinotus pupulus
- Procytettix thalassanax

=== Euschmidtiids ===
- Jagos monkey grasshopper (Chromomastax jagoi)
- Ufipa monkey grasshopper (Euschmidtia fitzgeraldi)
- Tanga monkey grasshopper (Euschmidtia tangana)

=== Mogoplistids ===
- Arachnocephalus subsulcatus
- Ectatoderus aldabrae
- Ectatoderus nigriceps
- Ectatoderus squamiger
- Ornebius stenus
- Ornebius syrticus

=== Pamphagids ===
- Parnassos stone grasshopper (Glyphanus obtusus)
- Groovy stone grasshopper (Kurtharzia sulcata)
- Slender stone grasshopper (Orchamus gracilis)
- Karpathos stone grasshopper (Orchamus kaltenbachi)
- Chopard's stone grasshopper (Paranocarodes chopardi)
- Eastern stone grasshopper (Prionotropis hystrix)
- Willemse's stone grasshopper (Prionotropis willemsorum)
- Purpurarian stone grasshopper (Purpuraria erna)
- Lanzarote stick grasshopper (Purpuraria magna)

=== Crickets ===
Species

- Seychelles palm cricket (Metioche bolivari)
- Laricis tree cricket (Oecanthus laricis)
- Orthoxiphus nigrifrons
- Phaeogryllus fuscus
- Scottiola salticiformis
- Seychelles short-winged cricket (Seychellesia longicercata)
- Seychellesia patellifera
- Zarceus major

Subspecies

- Phaloria insularis insularis

=== Acridids ===
- Uluguru slender grasshopper (Acanthoxia aculeus)
- Tanzanian coast grasshopper (Acteana alazonica)
- Uluguru forest edge grasshopper (Afrophlaeoba euthynota)
- Rubeho forest edge grasshopper (Afrophlaeoba longicornis)
- Nguru forest edge grasshopper (Afrophlaeoba nguru)
- Uluguru dusky grasshopper (Aresceutica morogorica)
- Usambara dusky grasshopper (Aresceutica subnuda)
- Ferdinand's grasshopper (Chorthippus ferdinandi)
- Karaman grasshopper (Chorthippus relicticus)
- Sicilian cross-backed grasshopper (Dociostaurus minutus)
- Seychelles palm grasshopper (Enoplotettix gardineri)
- Usambara noble grasshopper (Eupropacris pompalis)
- Uvinza grasshopper (Hadrolecocatantops uvinza)
- Lila Downs' friar grasshopper (Liladownsia fraile)
- Sardinian match grasshopper (Ochrilidia nuragica)
- Chelmos mountain grasshopper (Oropodisma chelmosi)
- Karavica mountain grasshopper (Oropodisma karavica)
- Parnassos mountain grasshopper (Oropodisma parnassica)
- Tymphrestos mountain grasshopper (Oropodisma tymphrestosi)
- Tymphi mountain grasshopper (Peripodisma tymphii)
- Pternoscirtus aldabrae
- Dinarian grasshopper (Rammeihippus dinaricus)
- Gran Canaria sand grasshopper (Sphingonotus guanchus)
- Knotty sand grasshopper (Sphingonotus nodulosus)
- Club toothed grasshopper (Stenobothrus clavatus)
- Zayante band-winged grasshopper (Trimerotropis infantilis)
- Santa Monica Mountains grasshopper (Trimerotropis occidentaloides)
- Lompoc grasshopper (Trimerotropis occulens)

=== Tettigoniids ===
- Brown false shieldback (Aroegas fuscus)
- Big-bellied glandular bush-cricket (Bradyporus macrogaster)
- Cyprian red-headed bush-cricket (Bucephaloptera cypria)
- Gran Canaria green bush-cricket (Calliphona alluaudi)
- Gomera green bush-cricket (Calliphona gomerensis)
- Palma green bush-cricket (Calliphona palmensis)
- Lesotho meadow katydid (Conocephalus basutoanus)
- Striped restio katydid (Conocephalus vaginalis)
- Mount Ida marbled bush-cricket (Eupholidoptera astyla)
- Spiny marbled bush-cricket (Eupholidoptera spinigera)
- Kawanaphila pachomai
- Chelmos Greek bush-cricket (Parnassiana chelmos)
- Tymphi Greek bush-cricket (Parnassiana tymphiensis)
- Tymphrestos Greek bush-cricket (Parnassiana tymphrestos)
- Rentz's ambush katydid (Peringueyella rentzi)
- Lucas' dark bush-cricket (Pholidoptera lucasi)
- Psacadonotus insulanus
- Lesina bush-cricket (Rhacocleis buchichii)
- Seychelles predatory bush-cricket (Seselphisis visenda)
- Jambila seedpod shieldback (Thoracistus jambila)
- Seedpod shieldback (Thoracistus semeniphagus)
- Inflated seedpod shieldback (Thoracistus thyraeus)
- Throscodectes xederoides
- Throscodectes xiphos
- Adriatic marmored bush-cricket (Zeuneriana marmorata)

=== Phaneropterids ===
Species

- Tree winter katydid (Brinckiella arboricola)
- Cyprian plump bush-cricket (Isophya mavromoustakisi)
- Epiros bright bush-cricket (Poecilimon gracilioides)
- Paros bright bush-cricket (Poecilimon paros)
- Pindos bright bush-cricket (Poecilimon pindos)
- Soulion bright bush-cricket (Poecilimon soulion)

Subspecies

- Isophya longicaudata longicaudata

== Hymenoptera ==
- Ammobates melectoides
- Andrena stepposa
- Bombus brachycephalus
- Crotch bumble bee (Bombus crotchii)
- Bombus dahlbomii
- Bombus fraternus
- Bombus haueri
- Bombus inexspectatus
- Bombus reinigiellus
- Bombus steindachneri
- Colletes merceti
- Colletes sierrensis
- Colletes wolfi
- Dasypoda frieseana
- Flavipanurgus granadensis
- Halictus carinthiacus
- Halictus microcardia
- Lasioglossum breviventre

== Lepidoptera ==
Lepidoptera comprises moths and butterflies. There are 51 species in the order Lepidoptera assessed as endangered.

=== Swallowtail butterflies ===
- Graphium levassori
- Apo Swallowtail (Graphium sandawanum)
- Queen Alexandra's birdwing (Ornithoptera alexandrae)
- Wallace's golden birdwing (Ornithoptera croesus)
- Southern tailed birdwing (Ornithoptera meridionalis)
- Papilio aristophontes
- Luzon peacock swallowtail (Papilio chikae)
- Homerus swallowtail (Papilio homerus)
- Papilio moerneri

=== Lycaenids ===
- Illidge's ant blue (Acrodipsas illidgei)
- Cloud copper (Aloeides nubilus)
- Arawacus aethesa
- Joiceya praeclarus
- Nirodia belphegor
- Orachrysops niobe
- Dickson's Copper (Oxychaeta dicksoni)
- Bathurst copper (Paralucia spinifera)
- Vogel's blue (Plebejus vogelii)
- Zullich's blue (Plebejus zullichi)
- Poecilmitis rileyi
- Poecilmitis swanepoeli
- Mesopotamian blue (Polyommatus dama)
- Piedmont anomalous blue (Polyommatus humedasae)
- Theresia's blue (Polyommatus theresiae)
- Fatma's blue (Pseudophilotes fatma)
- Wallengren's Copper (Trimenia wallengrenii)

=== Nymphalids ===
- Comoro friar (Amauris comorana)
- Atlas grayling (Arethusana aksouali)
- Biak dark crow (Euploea albicosta)
- Murphy's crow (Euploea caespes)
- Seychelles crow (Euploea mitra)
- Biak threespot crow (Euploea tripunctata)
- Karpathos grayling (Hipparchia christenseni)
- Ponza grayling (Hipparchia sbordonii)
- Hewitson's small tree-nymph (Ideopsis hewitsonii)
- Moroccan wall brown (Lasiommata meadewaldoi)
- Halicarnas brown (Maniola halicarnassus)
- Kuekenthal's yellow tiger (Parantica kuekenthali)
- Biak tiger (Parantica marcia)
- Milagros' tiger (Parantica milagros)
- Father Schoenig's chocolate (Parantica schoenigi)
- Bonthain tiger (Parantica sulewattan)
- Timor yellow tiger (Parantica timorica)
- Madeiran speckled wood (Pararge xiphia)
- Pseudochazara amymone
- Pseudochazara euxina
- Schneider's surprise (Tiradelphe schneideri)

=== Other Lepidoptera species ===
- Madeiran brimstone (Gonepteryx maderensis)
- Black grass-dart butterfly (Ocybadistes knightorum)
- Canary Islands Large White (Pieris cheiranthi)
- Fabulous green sphinx moth (Tinostoma smaragditis)

== Beetles ==
There are 72 beetle species assessed as endangered.

=== Dytiscids ===
- Agabus clypealis
- Agabus discicollis
- Agabus hozgargantae
- Deronectes aljibensis
- Graptodytes delectus
- Hydroporus pilosus
- Rhantus alutaceus
- Rhithrodytes agnus

=== Stag beetles ===
- Colophon barnardi
- Colophon eastmani
- Colophon haughtoni
- Colophon thunbergi
- Colophon whitei
- Dorcus alexisi

=== Geotrupids ===
- Ceratophyus martinezi
- Ceratophyus rossii
- Thorectes balearicus
- Thorectes baraudi
- Thorectes castillanus
- Thorectes catalonicus
- Thorectes chersinus
- Thorectes coiffaiti
- Thorectes distinctus
- Thorectes hernandezi
- Thorectes hispanus
- Thorectes orocantabricus
- Thorectes punctatissimus
- Thorectes punctatolineatus
- Thorectes puncticollis
- Thorectes sardous
- Thorectes variolipennis
- Typhaeus hiostius
- Typhaeus momus

=== Longhorn beetles ===
- Anaglyptus luteofasciatus
- Anaglyptus praecellens
- Crotchiella brachyptera
- Isotomus jarmilae
- Pseudosphegesthes bergeri
- Ropalopus ungaricus
- Stenopterus creticus
- Trichoferus bergeri
- Pitt Island longhorn beetle (Xylotoles costatus)

=== Scarabaeids ===
- Ahermodontus ambrosi
- Ateuchus ambiguus
- Canthonella gomezi
- Yanbaru long-armed scarab beetle (Cheirotonus jambar)
- Cryptocanthon altus
- Cryptocanthon nebulinus
- Cryptocanthon punctatus
- Dichotomius eucranioides
- Dichotomius schiffleri
- Endroedyolus paradoxus
- Heptaulacus gadetinus
- Shadowy chafer (Mellissius adumbratus)
- Nimbus anyerae
- Onoreidium howdeni
- Proagoderus uluguru
- Sarophorus punctatus

=== Other beetle species ===
- Ampedus assingi
- Ampedus quadrisignatus
- Sacramento beetle (Anthicus sacramento)
- Goldstreifiger (Buprestis splendens)
- Columbia river tiger beetle (Cicindela columbica)
- Puritan tiger beetle (Cicindela puritana)
- Eustra honchongensis
- Lichen weevil (Gymnopholus lichenifer)
- Harvengia vietnamita
- Leipaspis pinicola
- Violet click beetle (Limoniscus violaceus)
- Osmoderma cristinae
- Osmoderma italica
- Osmoderma lassallei

== Odonata ==
Odonata includes dragonflies and damselflies. There are 97 species and 19 subspecies in the order Odonata assessed as endangered.

=== Platystictids ===
- Drepanosticta ceratophora
- Cacao shadowdamsel (Palaemnema baltodanoi)
- Chiriquita shadowdamsel (Palaemnema chiriquita)
- Black-backed shadowdamsel (Palaemnema melanota)
- Palaemnema orientalis
- Reventazón shadowdamsel (Palaemnema reventazoni)
- Sulcosticta striata

=== Platycnemidids ===
Species

- Allocnemis montana
- Arabineura khalidi
- Chlorocnemis sp. nov. A
- Jungle threadtail (Elattoneura caesia)
- Two-spotted threadtail (Elattoneura oculata)
- Liberian riverjack (Mesocnemis tisi)
- Kubusi featherlegs (Metacnemis valida)
- Pilbara threadtail (Nososticta pilbara)
- Risiocnemis antoniae

Subspecies

- Coeliccia flavicauda masakii
- Coeliccia ryukyuensis amamii
- Coeliccia ryukyuensis ryukyuensis

=== Megapodagrionids ===
- Heteragrion calendulum
- Jamaican hypolestes (Hypolestes clara)
- Philogenia monotis
- Rhipidolestes okinawanus
- Paria wood elf (Sciotropis lattkei)

=== Gomphids ===
Species

- Asiagomphus coreanus
- Asiagomphus yayeyamensis
- Epigomphus armatus
- Humped knobtail (Epigomphus camelus)
- Guatemalan knobtail (Epigomphus clavatus)
- Horned knobtail (Epigomphus corniculatus)
- Donnelly's knobtail (Epigomphus donnellyi)
- Flint's knobtail (Epigomphus flinti)
- Limón knobtail (Epigomphus houghtoni)
- Maya knobtail (Epigomphus maya)
- Paulson's knobtail (Epigomphus paulsoni)
- Alajuela knobtail (Epigomphus subsimilis)
- Tuxtla knobtail (Epigomphus sulcatistyla)
- Cartago knobtail (Epigomphus verticicornis)
- Westfall's knobtail (Epigomphus westfalli)
- Chinese tiger (Gomphidia kelloggi)
- Rivulet tiger (Gomphidia pearsoni)
- Cherokee clubtail (Gomphus consanguis)
- Columbia clubtail (Gomphus lynnae)
- Microgomphus wijaya
- Notogomphus cottarellii
- Maathai's longleg (Notogomphus maathaiae)
- Notogomphus ruppeli
- Southern snaketail (Ophiogomphus australis)
- Edmund's snaketail (Ophiogomphus edmundo)
- Ris's sanddragon (Progomphus risi)
- Bristle-tipped sanddragon (Progomphus tennesseni)
- Elusive sanddragon (Progomphus zephyrus)

Subspecies

- Asiagomphus amamiensis amamiensis
- Asiagomphus amamiensis okinawanus
- Stylogomphus ryukyuanus asatol
- Stylogomphus ryukyuanus watanabei

=== Calopterygids ===
Species

- Caliphaea angka
- Glittering demoiselle (Calopteryx exul)
- Clear-winged demoiselle (Calopteryx hyalina)
- Syrian demoiselle (Calopteryx syriaca)
- Clearwing (Sapho puella)
- Cameroon sparklewing (Umma mesumbei)

Subspecies

- Matrona basilaris japonica

=== Coenagrionids ===
Species

- Acanthagrion williamsoni
- Aciagrion fasciculare
- Coenagriocnemis rufipes
- Drepanoneura donnellyi
- Mesamphiagrion demarmelsi
- Mesamphiagrion gaudiimontanum
- Mesamphiagrion nataliae
- Mesamphiagrion santainense
- Blue-and-orange threadtail (Microneura caligata)
- Pseudagrion arabicum
- Badplaas sprite (Pseudagrion inopinatum)
- Telebasis flammeola

Subspecies

- Pseudagrion torridum hulae

=== Aeshnids ===
Species

- Cretan spectre (Boyeria cretensis)
- Oligoaeschna kunigamiensis
- Rhionaeschna caligo
- Rhionaeschna galapagoensis
- Staurophlebia bosqi

Subspecies

- Planaeschna ishigakiana ishigakiana
- Planaeschna ishigakiana nagaminei
- Planaeschna risi sakishimana

=== Libellulids ===
Species

- Fruhstorfer's junglewatcher (Hylaeothemis fruhstorferi)
- Micrathyria coropinae
- Sympetrum maculatum
- Tetrathemis yerburii
- Thalassothemis marchali
- Urothemis thomasi

Subspecies

- Leucorrhinia intermedia ijimai
- Orthetrum poecilops miyajimaense
- Urothemis thomasi thomasi

=== Other Odonata ===
Species

- Allolestes maclachlani
- Dune ringtail (Austrolestes minjerriba)
- Bayadera ishigakiana
- Chlorogomphus okinawensis
- Amatola malachite (Chlorolestes apricans)
- Greek goldenring (Cordulegaster helladica)
- Hemicordulia apoensis
- Hemicordulia ogasawarensis
- Ancient greenling (Hemiphlebia mirabilis)
- Idionyx galeata
- Libellago balus
- Macromia kubokaiya
- Beautiful petaltail (Petalura pulcherrima)
- Metropolitan redspot (Phyllopetalia altarensis)
- Hispaniolan malachite (Phylolestes ethelae)
- Procordulia lompobatang
- Rhinocypha hageni
- Rhinocypha orea
- Rhinocypha uenoi

Subspecies

- Chlorogomphus brunneus brunneus
- Buchholz' cordulegaster (Cordulegaster helladica buchholzi)
- Cordulegaster helladica helladica
- Hemicordulia mindana nipponica

== Other insect species ==
- Mccarthy's plant-louse (Acizzia mccarthyi)
- Anisolabis scotti
- Giant torrent midge (Edwardsina gigantea)
- Seychelles winged stick insect (Graffaea seychellensis)
- Sugarfoot moth fly (Nemapalpus nearcticus)
- Canary dwarf mantis (Pseudoyersinia canariensis)
- Large blue lake mayfly (Tasmanophlebia lacuscoerulei)
- Fonseca's seed fly (Botanophila fonsecai)

== See also ==
- Lists of IUCN Red List endangered species
- List of least concern insects
- List of near threatened insects
- List of vulnerable insects
- List of critically endangered insects
- List of recently extinct insects
- List of data deficient insects
