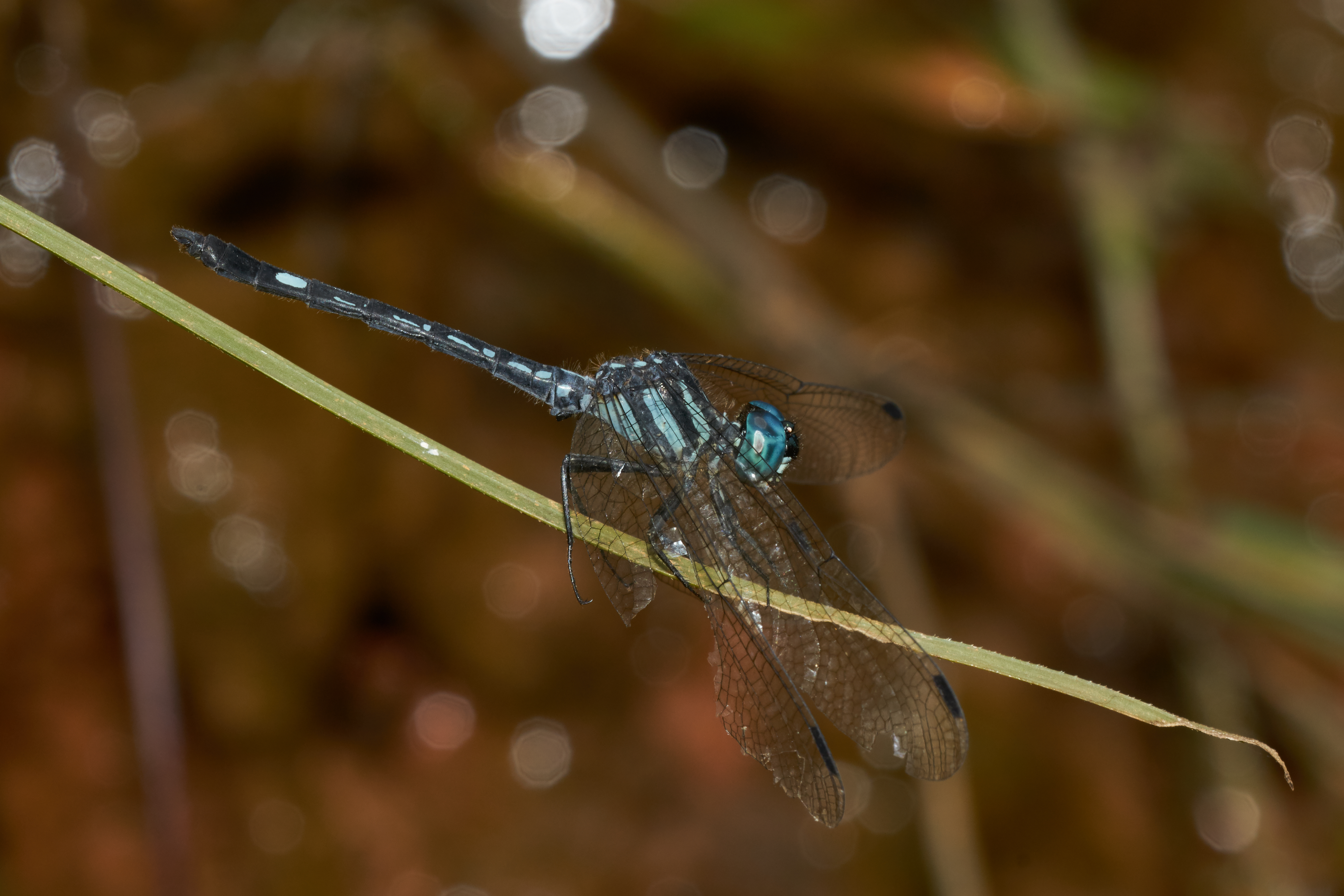
- male

Conservation status
- Data Deficient (IUCN 3.1)

Scientific classification
- Kingdom: Animalia
- Phylum: Arthropoda
- Class: Insecta
- Order: Odonata
- Infraorder: Anisoptera
- Family: Libellulidae
- Genus: Hylaeothemis
- Species: H. apicalis

Binomial name
- Hylaeothemis apicalis Fraser, 1924

Synonyms
- Hylaeothemis indica Fraser, 1946

= Hylaeothemis apicalis =

Species of dragonfly

Hylaeothemis apicalis, the blue hawklet, is a species of dragonfly in the family Libellulidae, endemic to India.

Fraser described Hylaeothemis indica in 1946 from specimens from the Western Ghats of India. Previously this species has been treated as H. fruhstorferi; a species probably actually confined to Sri Lanka. Fraser had also described a subspecies Hyaleothemis fruhstorferi apicalis in 1924. Therefore, H. fruhstorferi apicalis and H. indica are synonymous and as the taxon H. f. apicalis precedes the taxon H. indica, the correct name is Hylaeothemis apicalis.

== Description and habitat ==
It is a medium-sized dragonfly with bluish-green eyes. Its thorax is black, marked with pale blue. There are two fine mid-dorsal stripes and a humeral stripe broadening below. Laterally blue, with a rather broad black stripe which bifurcates below to form an inverted Y. Abdomen is slim, black, marked with pale blue. There is a large lateral spot and a triangular apical mid-dorsal spot on segment 1. There is a fine mid-dorsal stripe, a large subdorsal apical spot and a large ventro-lateral spot on segment 2. Segments 3 to 6 have lateral stripes. Segment 7 has a large dorsal spot on the basal three-fourths. Anal appendages are black. Female is similar to the male; but greenish-yellow instead of blue, as in the sub-adult male.

It is found in small colonies closely associated with forested marshes. It breeds in the seepage from marshes along the banks of mountain streams and usually found resting on the foliage beside streams.

== See also ==
- List of odonates of India
- List of odonata of Kerala
