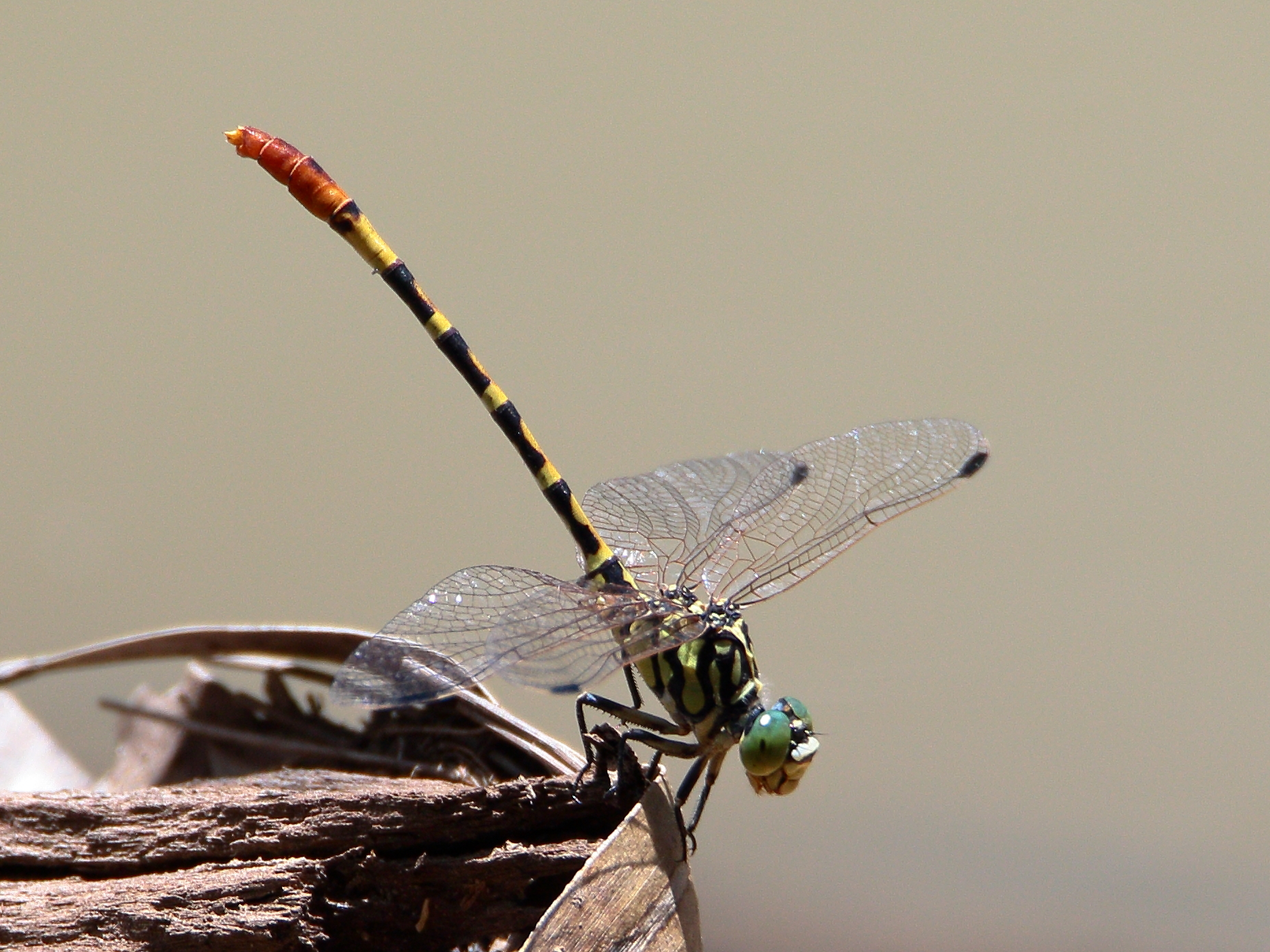
- Austroepigomphus turneri

Scientific classification
- Kingdom: Animalia
- Phylum: Arthropoda
- Clade: Pancrustacea
- Class: Insecta
- Order: Odonata
- Suborder: Anisoptera
- Family: Gomphidae
- Genus: Austroepigomphus; Fraser, 1951

Subgenera
- Austroepigomphus (Austroepigomphus) Fraser, 1951; Austroepigomphus (Xerogomphus) Watson, 1991

= Austroepigomphus =

Genus of dragonflies

Austroepigomphus is a genus of dragonflies in the family Gomphidae. The species are medium-sized with black and yellow markings. Segment 9 and segment 10 of their abdomen are stretched. They are commonly known as hunters. The three species of Austroepigomphus are found on the eastern and northern areas of the Australian continent.

== Taxonomy ==
In 1951, F.C. Fraser described the genus Austroepigomphus and assigned Onychogomphus praeruptus Selys, 1857, by original designation, as the type specimen. In 1991, Tony Watson sunk the name Austroepigomphus to subgenus status. Recent research has seen the name Austroepigomphus raised to genus level once again.

Austroepigomphus may also be considered to have two subgenera: Austroepigomphus, with a single species, and Xerogomphus, with two species.

== Species ==
The genus Austroepigomphus includes three species:

- Austroepigomphus praeruptus (Selys, 1857) - twinspot hunter
- Austroepigomphus gordoni (Watson, 1962) - western red hunter
- Austroepigomphus turneri (Martin, 1901) - flame-tipped hunter

== Etymology ==
The genus name Austroepigomphus combines the prefix austro- (from Latin auster, meaning “south wind”, hence “southern”) with Epigomphus, a genus name derived from the Greek prefix ἐπί (epi, “upon” or “on”) and Gomphus, a genus of dragonflies. The name refers to a southern representative of that group.

== See also ==
- List of Odonata species of Australia
