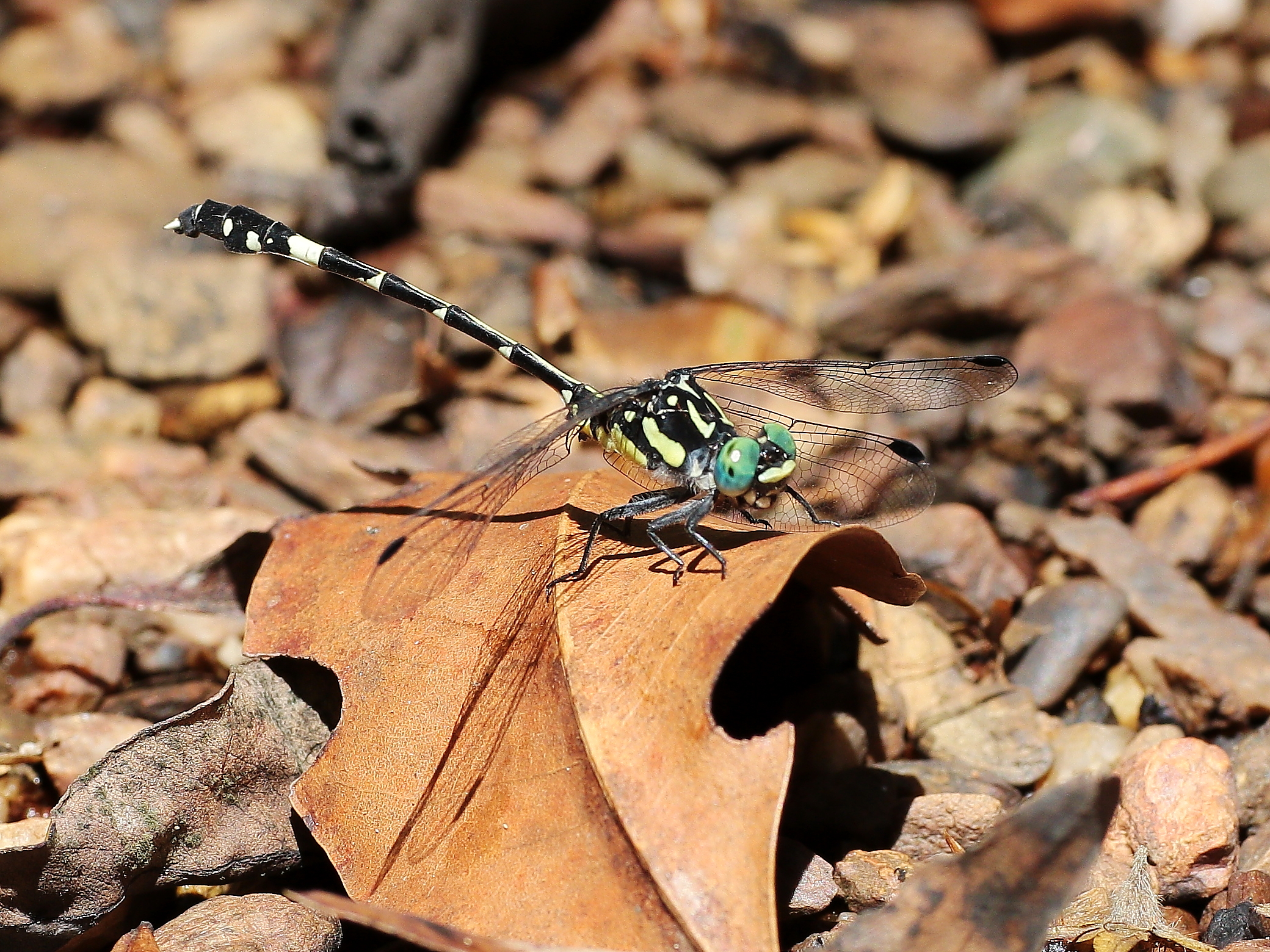
- Male twinspot hunter, Brisbane Qld.

Conservation status
- Least Concern (IUCN 3.1)

Scientific classification
- Kingdom: Animalia
- Phylum: Arthropoda
- Clade: Pancrustacea
- Class: Insecta
- Order: Odonata
- Suborder: Anisoptera
- Family: Gomphidae
- Genus: Austroepigomphus
- Species: A. praeruptus

Binomial name
- Austroepigomphus praeruptus (Selys, 1857)

Synonyms
- Onychogomphus praeruptus Selys, 1857; Austrogomphus praeruptus (Selys, 1857); Austrogomphus melaleucae Tillyard, 1909

= Austroepigomphus praeruptus =

Twinspot hunter

Species of dragonfly

Austroepigomphus praeruptus, also known as Austroepigomphus (Austroepigomphus) praeruptus, and up until recently Austrogomphus praeruptus, is a species of dragonfly in the family Gomphidae, It is known by the common names, Twinspot Hunter and Melaleuca Hunter.

Austroepigomphus praeruptus is a medium-sized, black and yellow dragonfly. It inhabits slow streams, rivers and ponds in eastern Australia.

== Etymology ==
The genus name Austroepigomphus combines the prefix austro- (from Latin auster, meaning “south wind”, hence “southern”) with Epigomphus, a genus name derived from the Greek prefix ἐπί (epi, “upon” or “on”) and Gomphus, a genus of dragonflies.

The species name praeruptus is derived from Latin ("broken off" or "abrupt"), referring to the broken yellow dorsal stripe on the abdomen. In 1857, Selys compared Onychogomphus praeruptus with Onychogomphus interruptus, which also has a yellow dorsal stripe interrupted at the segment joints.

== Gallery ==
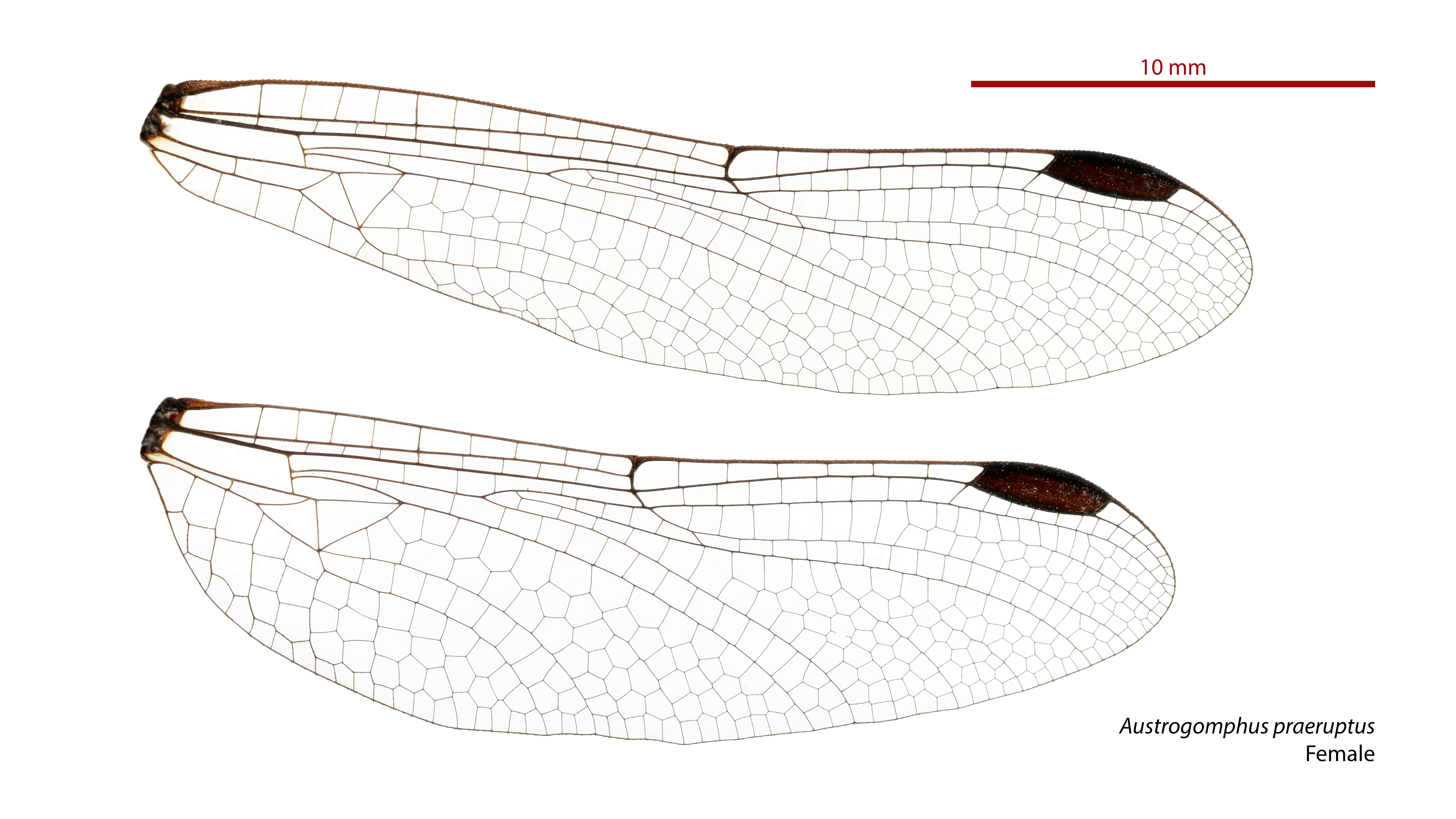
Female wings

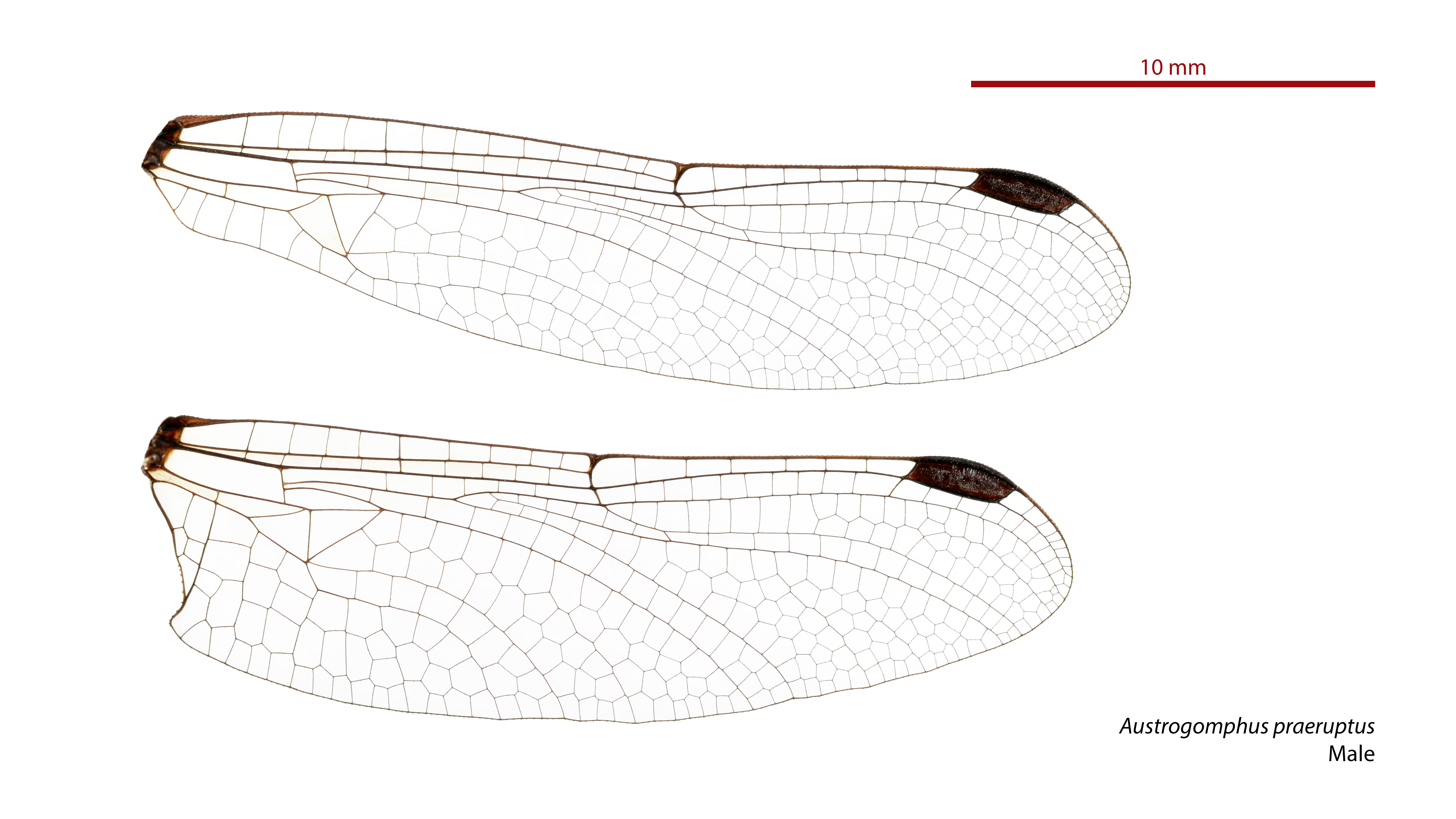
Male wings

== Note ==
The taxonomic status of Austroepigomphus praeruptus and Austrogomphus melaleucae has been uncertain. The type specimen originally used to describe Austroepigomphus praeruptus is now lost. Austrogomphus melaleucae is now considered a junior synonym of Austroepigomphus praeruptus.

== See also ==
- List of Odonata species of Australia
