= Austroepigomphus gordoni =

Western red hunter

Conservation status
- Least Concern (IUCN 3.1)

Scientific classification
- Kingdom: Animalia
- Phylum: Arthropoda
- Clade: Pancrustacea
- Class: Insecta
- Order: Odonata
- Suborder: Anisoptera
- Family: Gomphidae
- Genus: Austroepigomphus
- Species: A. gordoni

Binomial name
- Austroepigomphus gordoni (Watson, 1962)

Synonyms
- Austrogomphus gordoni Watson, 1962

Species of dragonfly

Austroepigomphus gordoni, also known as Austroepigomphus (Xerogomphus) gordoni, and up until recently Austrogomphus gordoni, is a species of dragonfly of the family Gomphidae, commonly known as the western red hunter. It inhabits streams and pools in Western Australia.

Austroepigomphus gordoni is a small, black and yellow dragonfly with a red tip to its tail.

== Etymology ==
The genus name Austroepigomphus combines the prefix austro- (from Latin auster, meaning “south wind”, hence “southern”) with Epigomphus, a genus name derived from the Greek prefix ἐπί (epi, “upon” or “on”) and Gomphus, a genus of dragonflies.

In 1962, Tony Watson named this species gordoni, an eponym honouring Stewart Gordon, a member of a family long associated with Millstream and Kangiangi stations in the Pilbara, Western Australia.

== Gallery ==
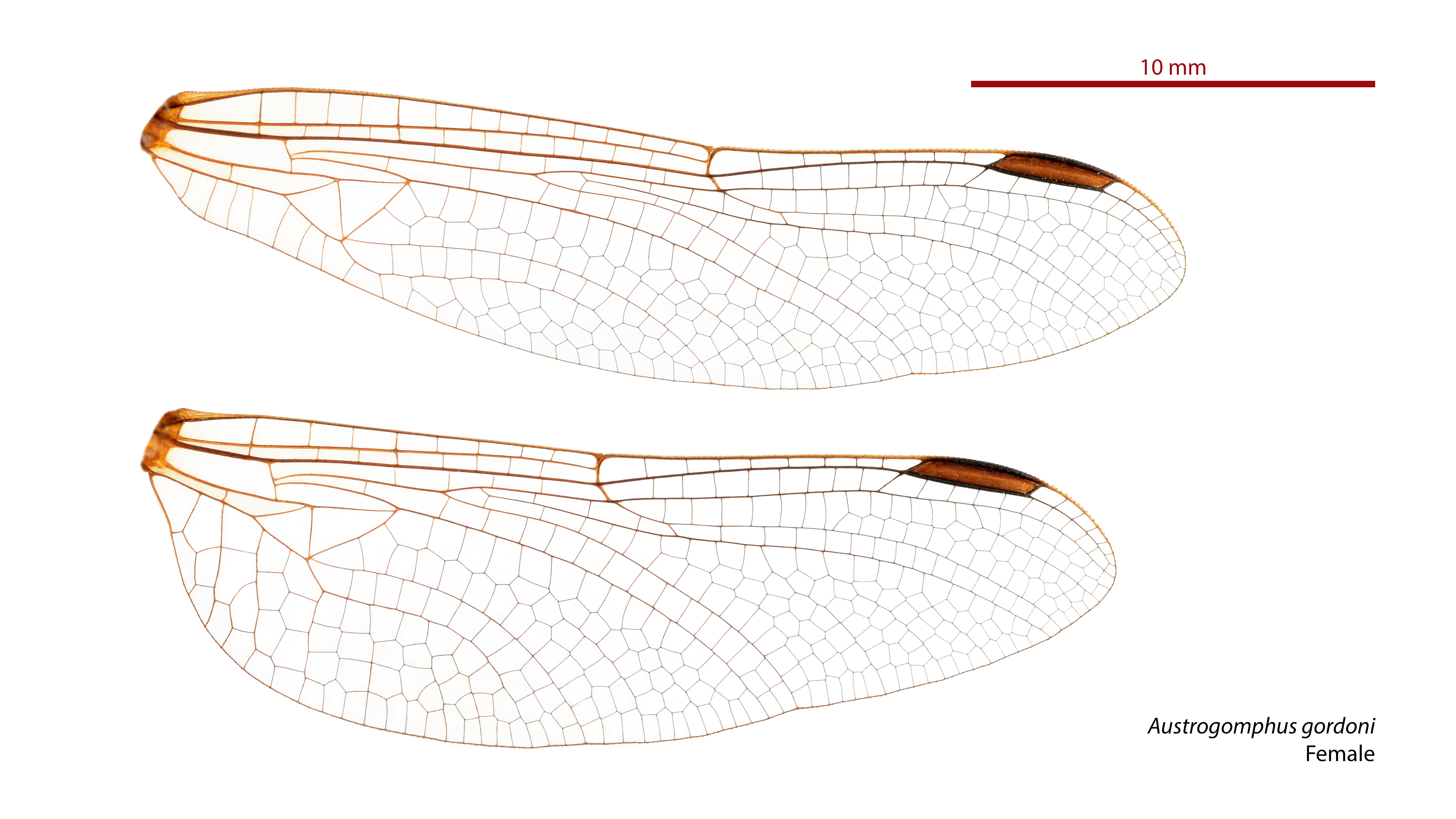
Female wings

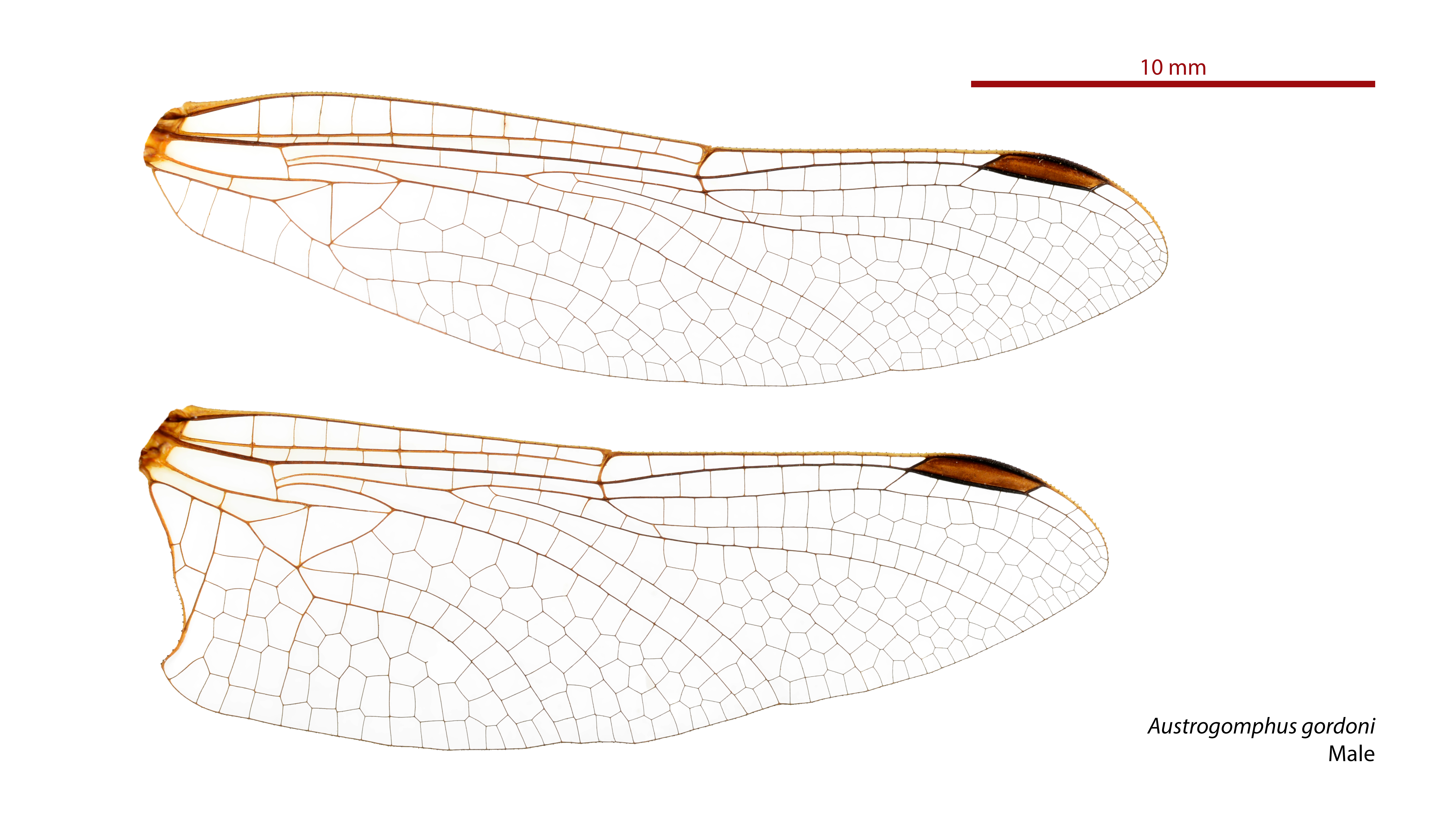
Male wings

== See also ==
- List of Odonata species of Australia
