= Epigomphus echeverrii =

Conservation status
- Least Concern (IUCN 3.1)

Scientific classification
- Kingdom: Animalia
- Phylum: Arthropoda
- Clade: Pancrustacea
- Class: Insecta
- Order: Odonata
- Infraorder: Anisoptera
- Family: Gomphidae
- Genus: Epigomphus
- Species: E. echeverrii

Binomial name
- Epigomphus echeverrii Brooks, 1989

Species of dragonfly

Epigomphus echeverrii, also known as the volcano knobtail, is a species of dragonfly in the family Gomphidae. It has a dark brown prothorax, a black pterothorax marked with a number of blue-green stripes and spots, and a black abdomen. The dragonfly is endemic to Costa Rica, where it is found in streams in lowland rainforests in the provinces of Guanacaste and San José. It is classified as being of least concern by the IUCN.

== Taxonomy ==
Epigomphus echeverrii was formally described in 1989 by the odonatologist Stephen Brooks based on an adult male specimen collected from near Cacao Volcano in Guanacaste Province, Costa Rica. It is named after Gustavo Echeverri, a rancher who donated his land to the Guanacaste National Park. It has the English common name volcano knobtail. It is thought to be closely related to Epigomphus crepidus-subsimilis group.

== Description ==
In adult males, the head has a black labrum, brown postclypeus, light blue-green labium, and brown and blue-green frons. The prothorax is dark brown with blue-green markings. The pterothorax is black with a number of blue-green stripes and spots. The abdomen is black and has ten segments, with light blue-green stripes and spots. The wings have red-brown pterostigma and black veins. Like other Costa Rican endemic Epigomphus, E. echeverrii females have a unique pair of postocellar "horns". In the holotype male, the abdominal length is 43.8 mm, the hind-wing length is 36 mm and the total length is 58.4 mm. In the allotype female, the abdominal length is 41 mm, the hind-wing length is 40.5 mm and the total length is 62 mm.

== Distribution and conservation ==
Endemic to Costa Rica, Epigomphus echeverrii is known from the provinces of Guanacaste and San José. It is found in a large extent of coastal mountains from the Nicaraguan border south to San José. It inhabits rocky streams in rainforests at elevations of around 600–1,150 m (1,970–3,770 ft). The species has a total range that is estimated to be around 2,000 km², but likely also occurs in many currently unsurveyed areas with suitable streams. The species is classified as being of least concern by the IUCN as it occurs in some well-protected areas, such as Guanacaste National Park and El Rodeo Forest Reserve, and shows no indications of population decline.
