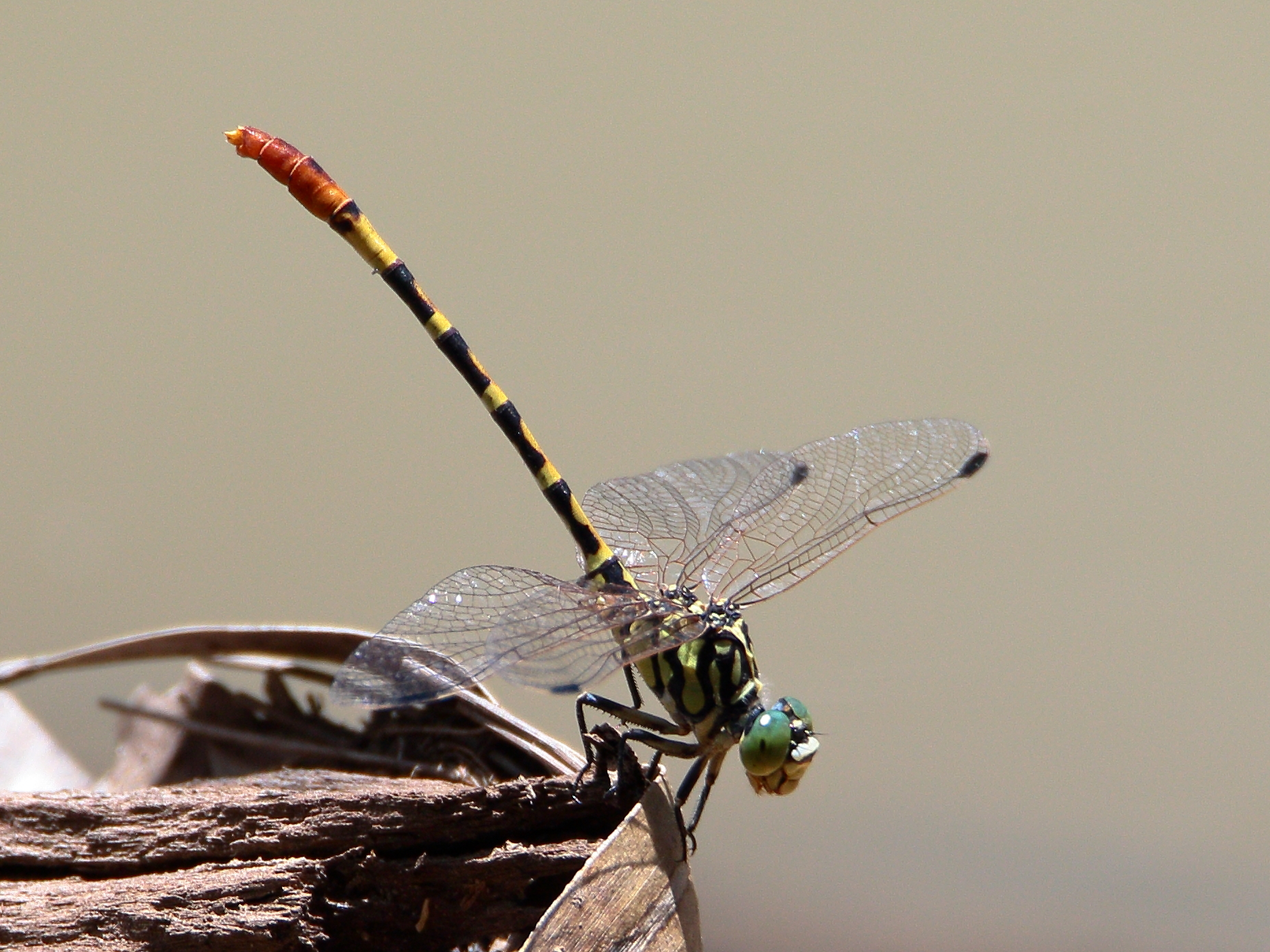
- North Queensland

Conservation status
- Least Concern (IUCN 3.1)

Scientific classification
- Kingdom: Animalia
- Phylum: Arthropoda
- Clade: Pancrustacea
- Class: Insecta
- Order: Odonata
- Suborder: Anisoptera
- Family: Gomphidae
- Genus: Austroepigomphus
- Species: A. turneri

Binomial name
- Austroepigomphus turneri (Martin, 1901)

Synonyms
- Austrogomphus turneri Martin, 1901

= Austroepigomphus turneri =

Flame-tipped hunter

Species of dragonfly

Austroepigomphus turneri, also known as Austroepigomphus (Xerogomphus) turneri, and up until recently Austrogomphus turneri, is a species of dragonfly of the family Gomphidae, commonly known as the flame-tipped hunter. It inhabits both rapid and slow streams and pools across northern Australia.

Austroepigomphus turneri is a medium-sized, black and yellow dragonfly with a red tip to its tail.

== Etymology ==
The genus name Austroepigomphus combines the prefix austro- (from Latin auster, meaning “south wind”, hence “southern”) with Epigomphus, a genus name derived from the Greek prefix ἐπί (epi, “upon” or “on”) and Gomphus, a genus of dragonflies.

In 1901, René Martin likely named this species turneri, an eponym honouring either Gilbert or Rowland Turner of Mackay, Queensland, who collected the specimens.

== Gallery ==
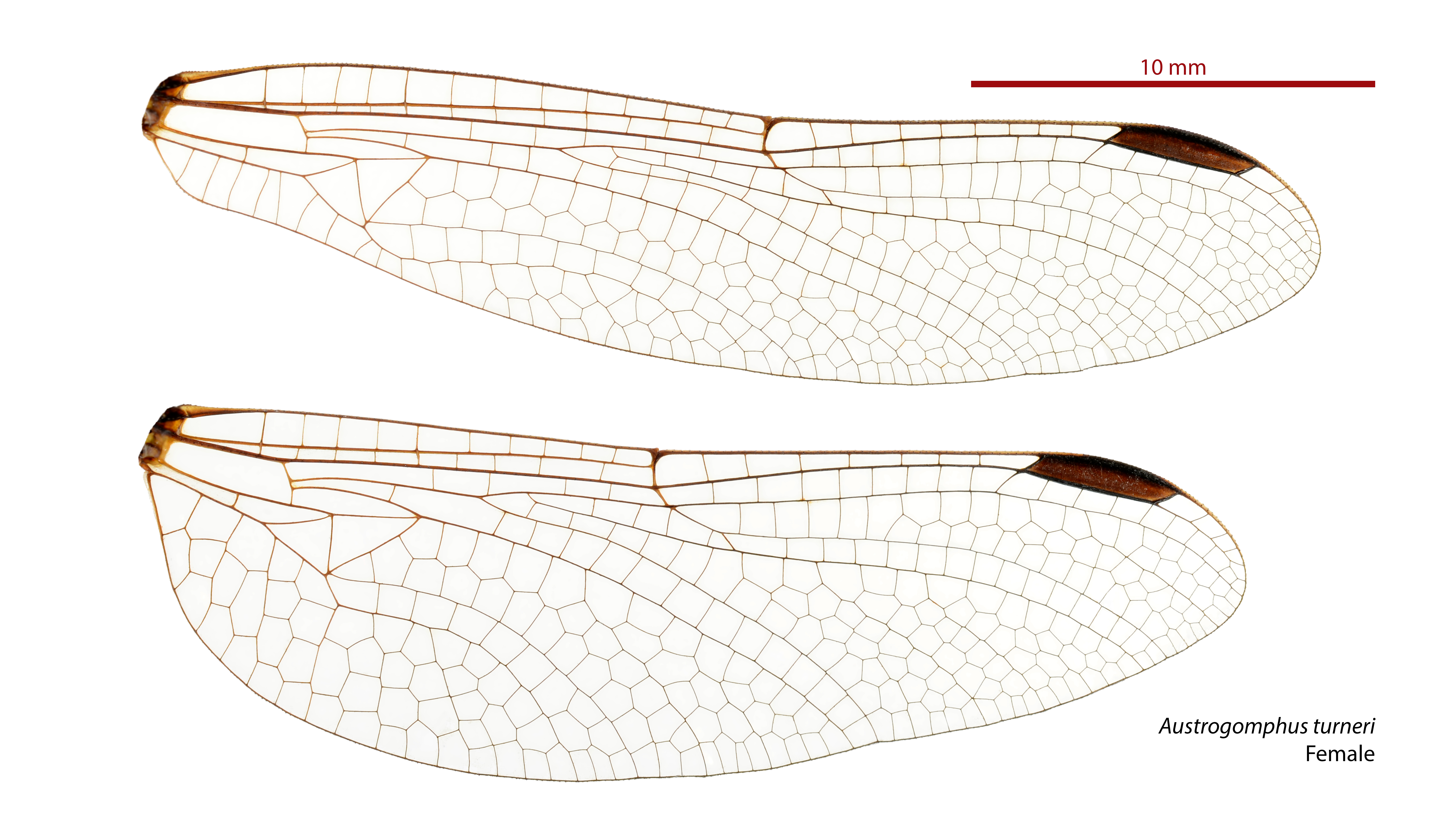
Female wings

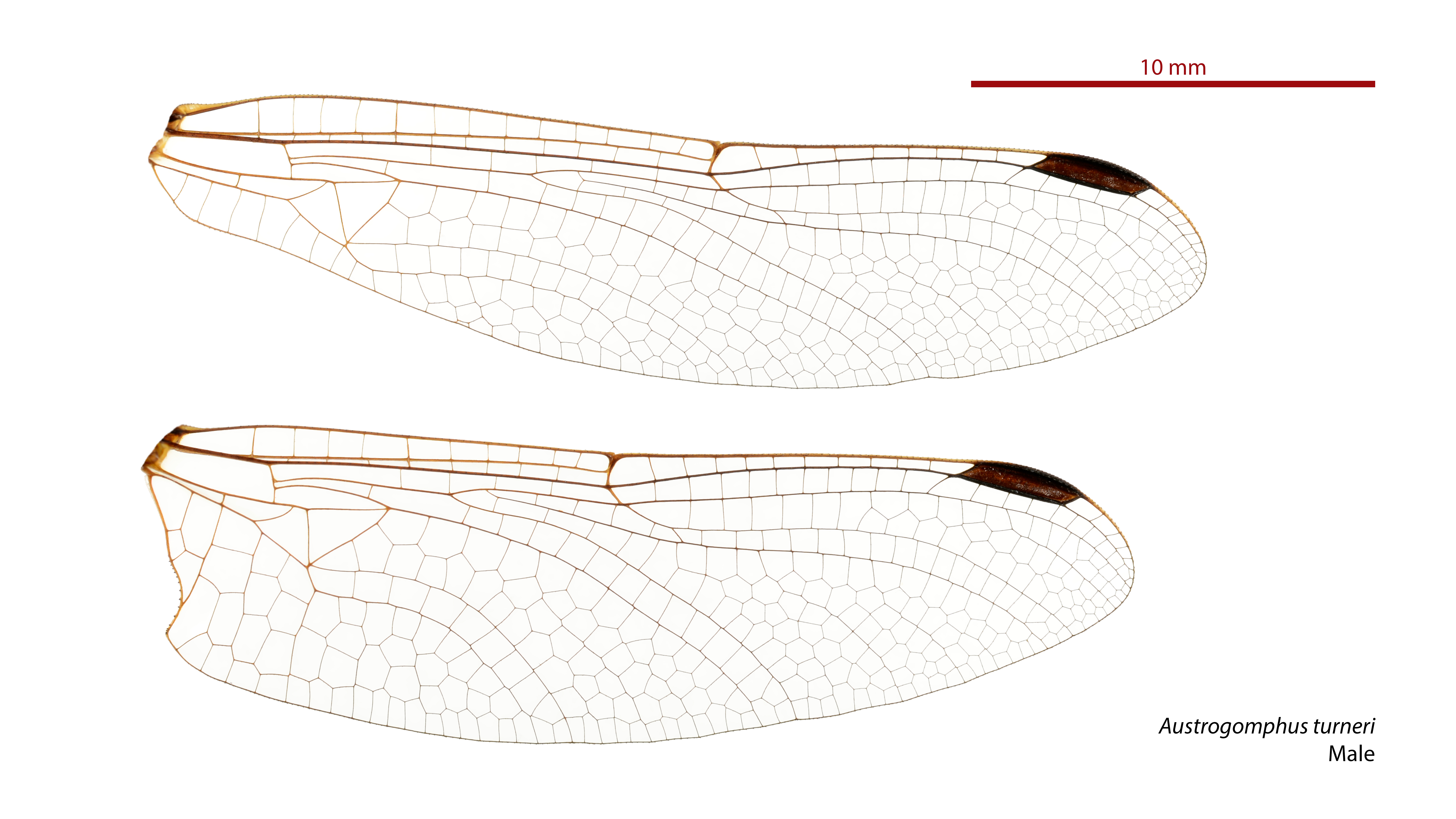
Male wings

== See also ==
- List of Odonata species of Australia
