= Nocticola pheromosa =

Scientific classification
- Kingdom: Animalia
- Phylum: Arthropoda
- Clade: Pancrustacea
- Class: Insecta
- Order: Blattodea
- Family: Nocticolidae
- Genus: Nocticola
- Species: N. pheromosa

Binomial name
- Nocticola pheromosa Foo, 2023

Species of cockroach

Nocticola pheromosa is a species of cockroach in the family Nocticolidae. Nocticola pheromosa are found in Singapore. The species is named after Pheromosa, an Ultra Beast Pokémon that resembles a feminine anthropomorphic cockroach that has recently molted.
