= Palaemnema paulicoba =

Conservation status
- Least Concern (IUCN 3.1)

Scientific classification
- Kingdom: Animalia
- Phylum: Arthropoda
- Class: Insecta
- Order: Odonata
- Suborder: Zygoptera
- Family: Platystictidae
- Genus: Palaemnema
- Species: P. paulicoba

Binomial name
- Palaemnema paulicoba Calvert, 1931

Species of damselfly

Palaemnema paulicoba is a species of damselfly in the family Platystictidae. It is endemic to Mexico. Its natural habitats are subtropical or tropical moist lowland forests and rivers. It is threatened by habitat loss.
