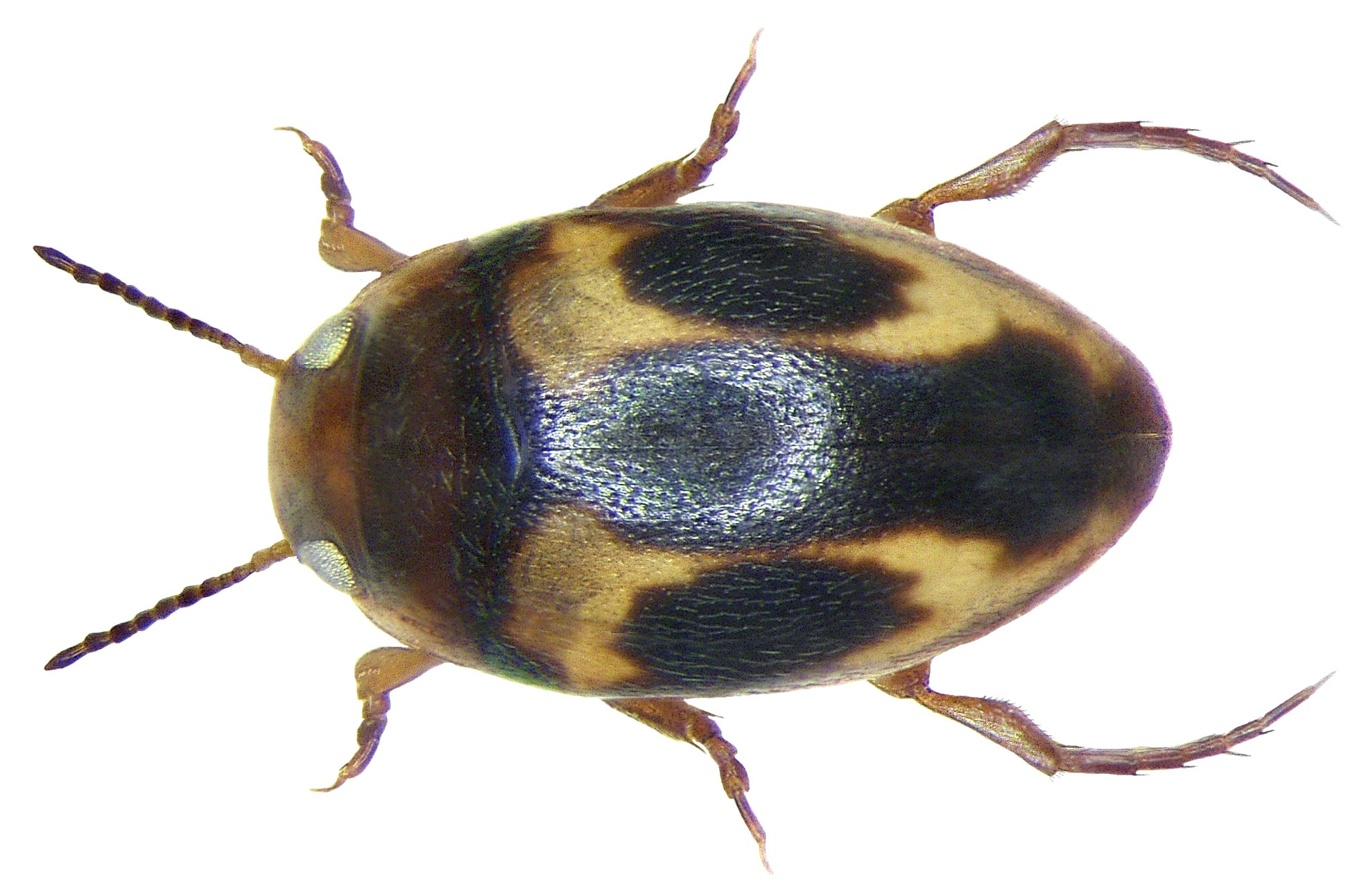
- Graptodytes pictus (Fabricius, 1787)

Scientific classification
- Domain: Eukaryota
- Kingdom: Animalia
- Phylum: Arthropoda
- Class: Insecta
- Order: Coleoptera
- Suborder: Adephaga
- Family: Dytiscidae
- Genus: Graptodytes; Seidlitz, 1887

= Graptodytes =

Genus of beetles

Graptodytes is a genus of beetles in family Dytiscidae. It contains the following species:

- Graptodytes aequalis (Zimmermann, 1918)
- Graptodytes atlantis (Théry, 1933)
- Graptodytes aurasius (Jeannel, 1907)
- Graptodytes bilineatus (Sturm, 1835)
- Graptodytes bremondi Guignot, 1934
- Graptodytes bussleri Fery, 1994
- Graptodytes castilianus Fery, 1995
- Graptodytes delectus (Wollaston, 1864)
- Graptodytes eremitus Ribera & Faille, 2010
- Graptodytes flavipes (Olivier, 1795)
- Graptodytes fractus (Sharp, 1882)
- Graptodytes granularis (Linnaeus, 1767)
- Graptodytes ignotus (Mulsant & Rey, 1861)
- Graptodytes kuchtai (Breit, 1908)
- Graptodytes parisii Gridelli, 1939
- Graptodytes pictus (Fabricius, 1787)
- Graptodytes pietrii Normand, 1933
- Graptodytes sedilloti (Régimbart, 1878)
- Graptodytes siculus Fery, 1995
- Graptodytes snizeki Hendrich, 1993
- Graptodytes varius (Aubé, 1838)
- Graptodytes veterator (Zimmermann, 1918)
