= Ahermodontus =

Scientific classification
- Kingdom: Animalia
- Phylum: Arthropoda
- Clade: Pancrustacea
- Class: Insecta
- Order: Coleoptera
- Suborder: Polyphaga
- Infraorder: Scarabaeiformia
- Family: Scarabaeidae
- Subfamily: Aphodiinae
- Tribe: Aphodiini
- Genus: Ahermodontus; Báguena, 1930

Genus of beetles

Ahermodontus is a genus of beetles of the family Scarabaeidae.

== Species ==
- Ahermodontus ambrosi Pardo Alcaide, 1936
- Ahermodontus bischoffi (Všetečka, 1939)
- Ahermodontus marini Báguena, 1930
