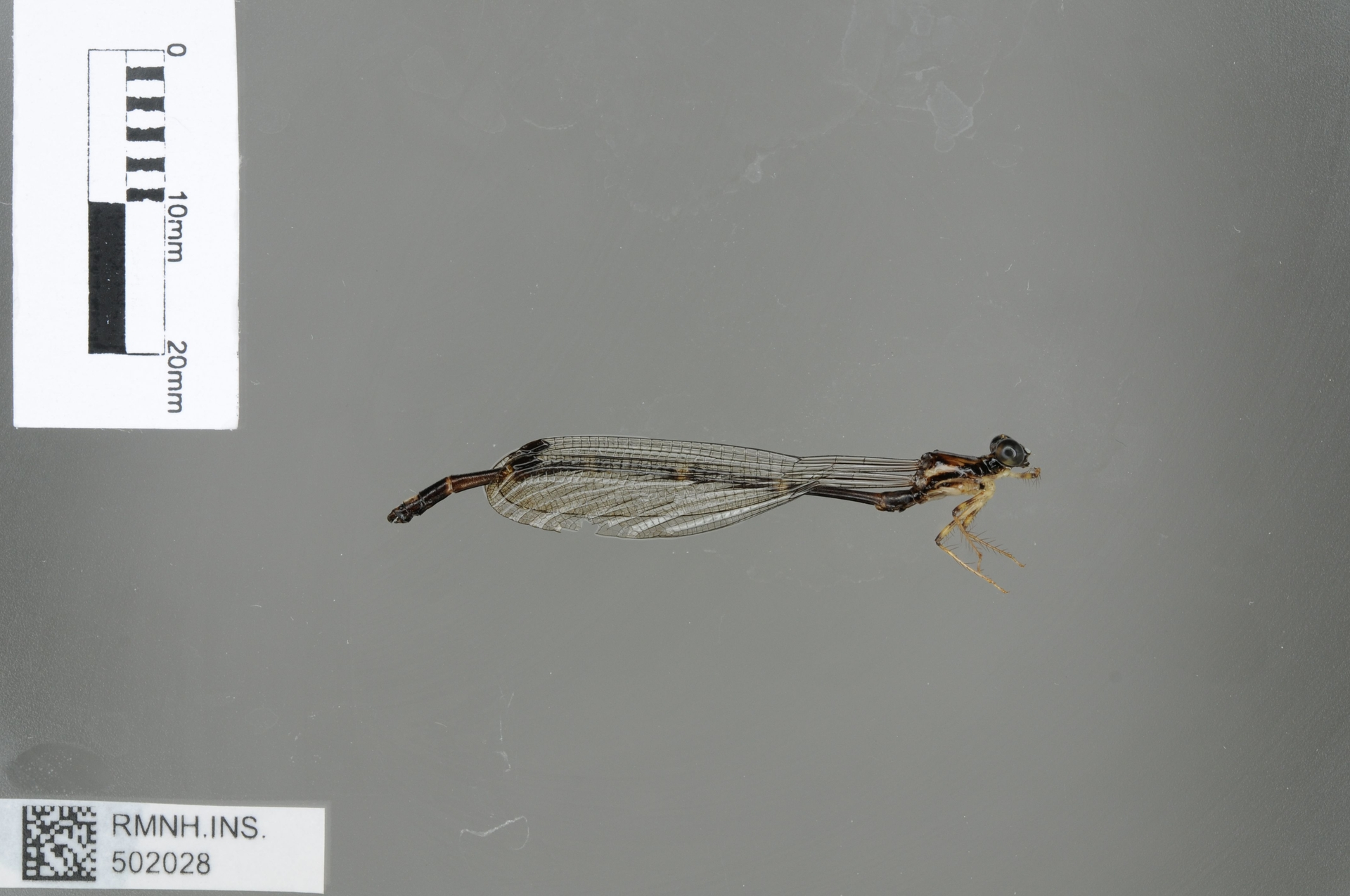

Conservation status
- Vulnerable (IUCN 3.1)

Scientific classification
- Kingdom: Animalia
- Phylum: Arthropoda
- Class: Insecta
- Order: Odonata
- Suborder: Zygoptera
- Genus: Sciotropis
- Species: S. cyclanthorum

Binomial name
- Sciotropis cyclanthorum Rácenis, 1959

= Sciotropis cyclanthorum =

Species of damselfly

Sciotropis cyclanthorum is a species of damselfly in the family Megapodagrionidae. It is endemic to Venezuela. Its natural habitats are subtropical or tropical moist montane forests and rivers. It is threatened by habitat loss.
