= Ahermodontus marini =

Scientific classification
- Kingdom: Animalia
- Phylum: Arthropoda
- Clade: Pancrustacea
- Class: Insecta
- Order: Coleoptera
- Suborder: Polyphaga
- Infraorder: Scarabaeiformia
- Family: Scarabaeidae
- Genus: Ahermodontus
- Species: A. marini

Binomial name
- Ahermodontus marini Báguena, 1930

Species of beetle

Ahermodontus marini is a species of beetle of the family Scarabaeidae. It is found in Spain.

== Description ==
Adults reach a length of about 4 mm (0.16 in). They have a stout, strongly convex, shiny, glabrous, black body, with the margin of the clypeus and legs reddish and the antennal club testaceous.
