= Throscodectes =

Scientific classification
- Domain: Eukaryota
- Kingdom: Animalia
- Phylum: Arthropoda
- Class: Insecta
- Order: Orthoptera
- Suborder: Ensifera
- Family: Tettigoniidae
- Subfamily: Tettigoniinae
- Tribe: Nedubini
- Genus: Throscodectes; Rentz, 1985

Genus of cricket-like animals

Throscodectes is a genus of Australian bush crickets.

== Species ==
The Orthoptera Species File lists:

- Throscodectes xederoides
- Throscodectes xiphos
