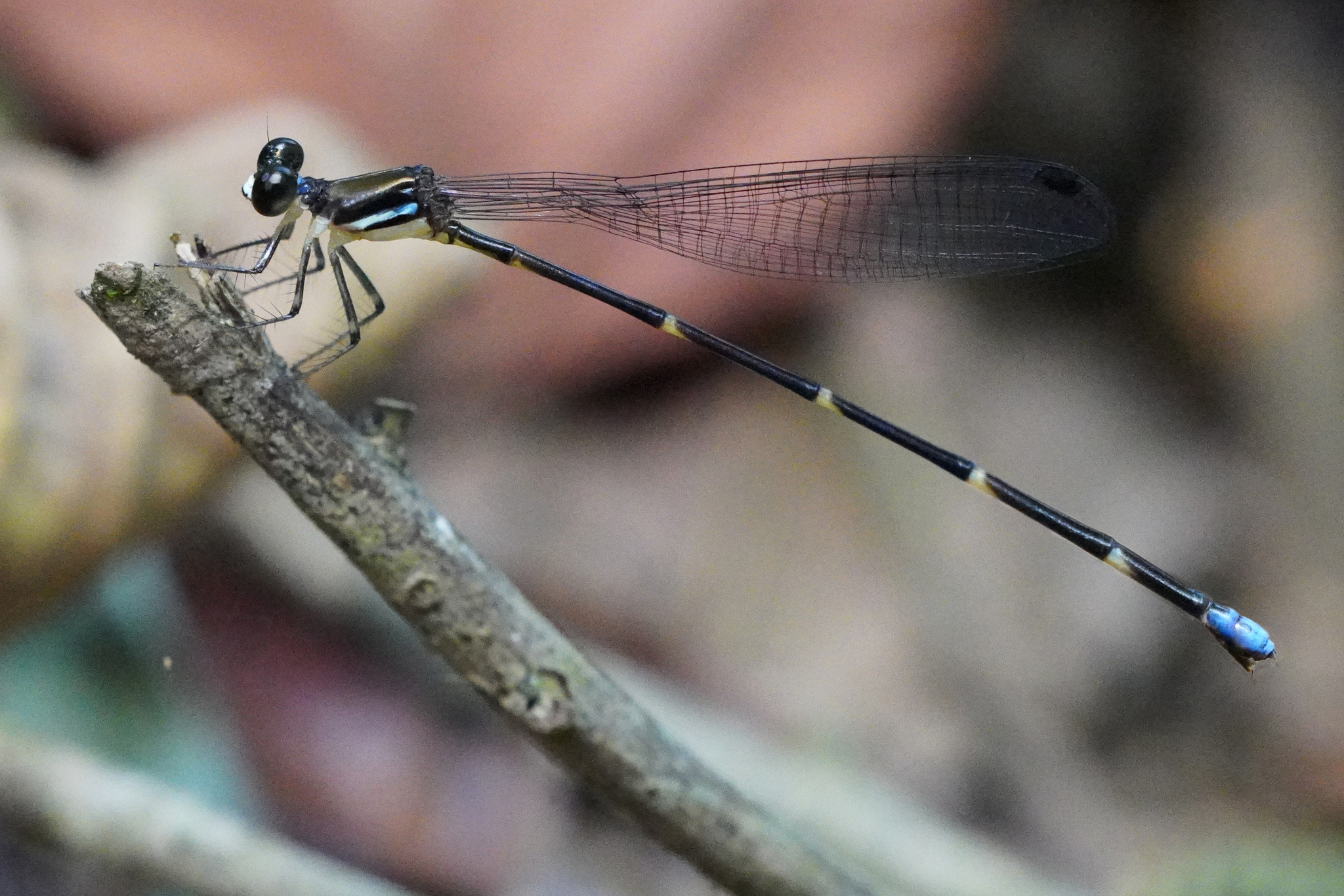

Conservation status
- Least Concern (IUCN 3.1)

Scientific classification
- Kingdom: Animalia
- Phylum: Arthropoda
- Class: Insecta
- Order: Odonata
- Suborder: Zygoptera
- Family: Platystictidae
- Genus: Palaemnema
- Species: P. gigantula

Binomial name
- Palaemnema gigantula Calvert, 1931

= Palaemnema gigantula =

Species of damselfly

Palaemnema gigantula is a species of damselfly in the family Platystictidae. It is found in Costa Rica and Nicaragua. Its natural habitats are subtropical or tropical moist lowland forests and rivers. It is threatened by habitat loss.
