= Graptodytes bilineatus =

Scientific classification
- Domain: Eukaryota
- Kingdom: Animalia
- Phylum: Arthropoda
- Class: Insecta
- Order: Coleoptera
- Suborder: Adephaga
- Family: Dytiscidae
- Genus: Graptodytes
- Species: G. bilineatus

Binomial name
- Graptodytes bilineatus (Sturm, 1835)

Species of beetle

Graptodytes bilineatus is a species of beetle belonging to the family Dytiscidae.

It is native to Europe.
