= Sciotropis =

Scientific classification
- Kingdom: Animalia
- Phylum: Arthropoda
- Clade: Pancrustacea
- Class: Insecta
- Order: Odonata
- Suborder: Zygoptera
- Superfamily: Calopterygoidea
- Genus: Sciotropis; Rácenis, 1959

Genus of damselflies

Sciotropis is a genus of South American damselflies. There are at least two described species in Sciotropis.

As a result of molecular phylogenetic studies by Dijkstra et al. in 2013, the genus Sciotropis is considered "incertae sedis", without an assigned family but within the superfamily Calopterygoidea.

== Species ==
The following species are currently placed in Sciotropis:

- Sciotropis cyclanthorum Rácenis, 1959
- Sciotropis lattkei De Marmels, 1994
