= Nocticola gerlachi =

Conservation status
- Endangered (IUCN 3.1)

Scientific classification
- Kingdom: Animalia
- Phylum: Arthropoda
- Class: Insecta
- Order: Blattodea
- Family: Nocticolidae
- Genus: Nocticola
- Species: N. gerlachi

Binomial name
- Nocticola gerlachi Roth, 2003

Species of cockroach

Nocticola gerlachi, or Gerlach's cockroach, is a species of cockroach in the family Nocticolidae. Nocticola gerlachi are found in the Seychelles, an archipelago off the African Coast. The cockroach is brown in color with "whitish" legs. The species is named after Justin Gerlach, who discovered them. Only male specimens have been collected. Females are unknown.
