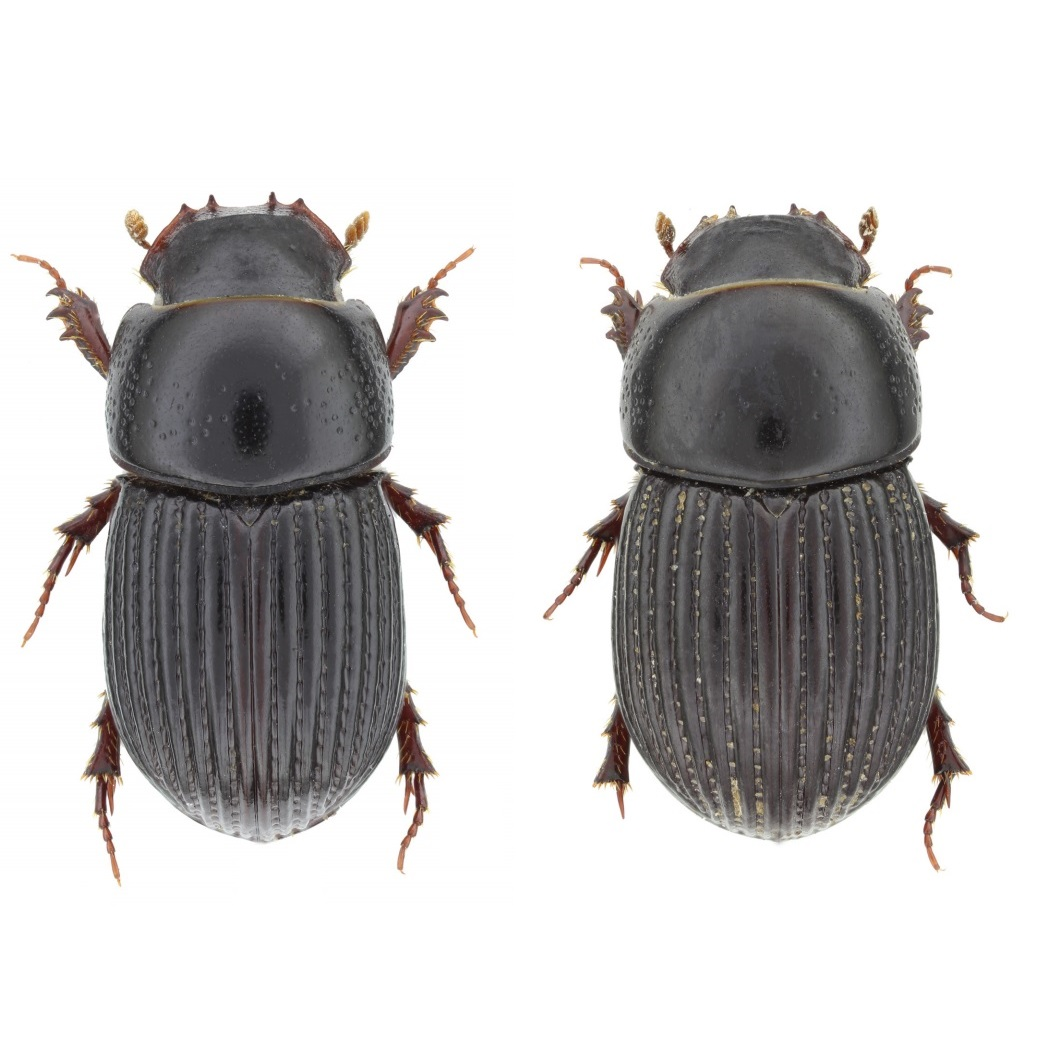

Scientific classification
- Kingdom: Animalia
- Phylum: Arthropoda
- Clade: Pancrustacea
- Class: Insecta
- Order: Coleoptera
- Suborder: Polyphaga
- Infraorder: Scarabaeiformia
- Family: Scarabaeidae
- Genus: Ahermodontus
- Species: A. bischoffi

Binomial name
- Ahermodontus bischoffi (Všetečka, 1939)

Synonyms
- Aphodius (Ammoecius) bischoffi Všetečka, 1939

= Ahermodontus bischoffi =

Species of beetle

Ahermodontus bischoffi is a species of beetle of the family Scarabaeidae. It is found in Albania.

== Description ==
Adults reach a length of about 4.5 mm (0.18 in). They have a somewhat glossy, glabrous, ovoid, highly convex, black body.

== Etymology ==
The species is named in honour of Alfons Bishoff, who first collected the species.
