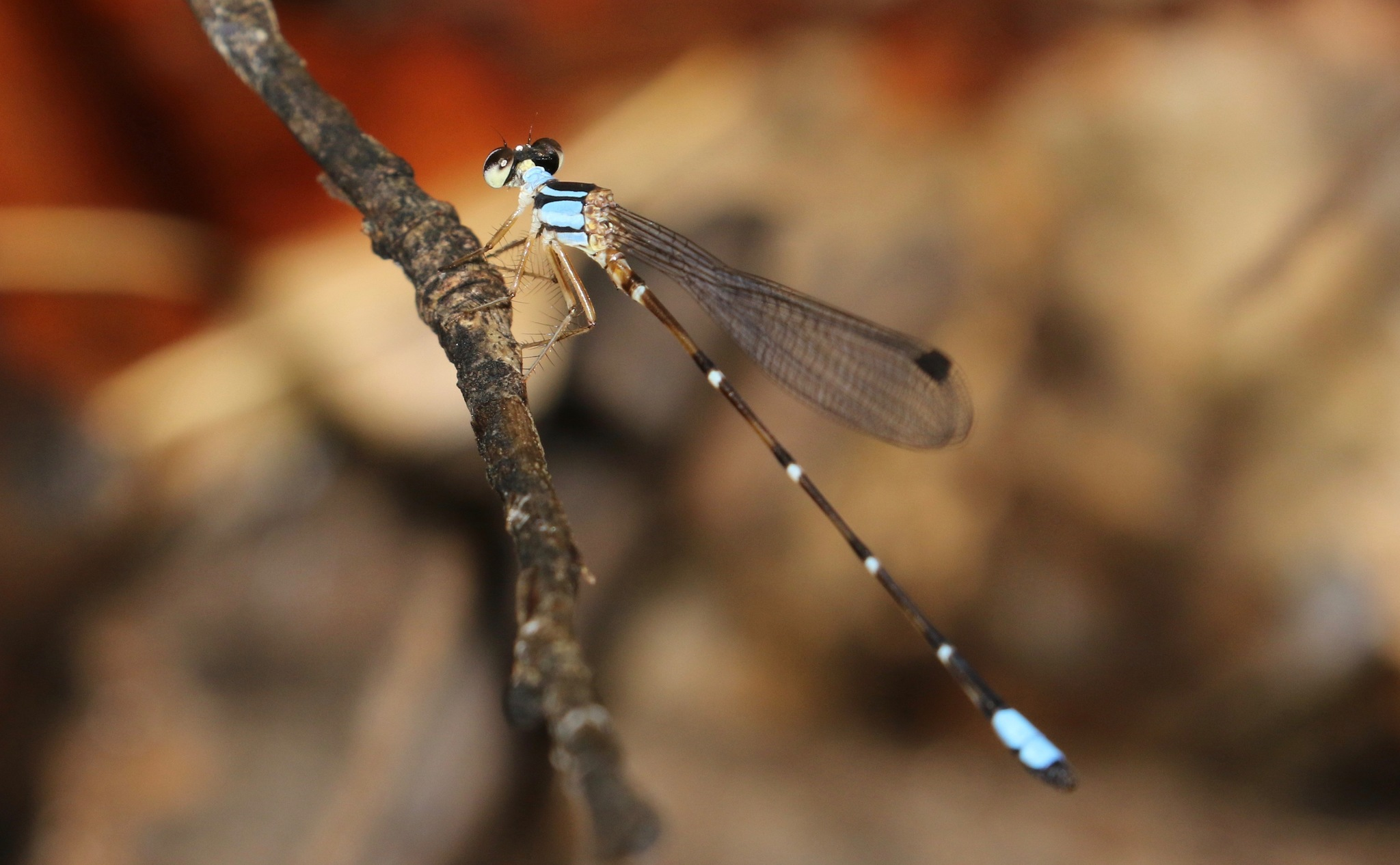

Scientific classification
- Kingdom: Animalia
- Phylum: Arthropoda
- Clade: Pancrustacea
- Class: Insecta
- Order: Odonata
- Suborder: Zygoptera
- Family: Platystictidae
- Genus: Palaemnema
- Species: P. domina

Binomial name
- Palaemnema domina Calvert, 1903

= Palaemnema domina =

Species of damselfly

Palaemnema domina, the desert shadowdamsel, is a species of damselfly in the family Platystictidae. It is native to the extreme south of the United States, Mexico and Central America.

== Description ==
Palaemnema domina has a total length of 35 to 44 mm (1.4 to 1.7 in) and a wingspan of 38 to 48 mm (1.5 to 1.9 in). The upper half of the eyes is dark brown and the lower half dull yellow. The prothorax is blue and the thorax is also blue, but a more muted colour in the female. It is striped horizontally with black, the dorsal stripe being broad. The abdomen is mainly brown, with the foremost portion of segments 3 to 7 being pale blue and the hindmost portions of segments 2 to 7 being black. Segments 8 and 9 are blue in the male, and segment 9 is blue and enlarged in the female. Segment 10 is black.

== Distribution and habitat ==
Palaemnema domina is found in south-eastern Arizona, Mexico, and Central America as far south as Nicaragua. The shadowdamsels are in general forest insects, and this species is found in dense undergrowth alongside small, rocky streams.

== Biology ==
Palaemnema domina is on the wing from July to September. In the heat of the day adults congregate in dense vegetation and tangled roots of fallen sycamores and cottonwoods within a few feet of the ground and near to streams. They perch with abdomens dangling and can easily be caught by hand at this time. In the morning and evening and on cool cloudy or rainy days they are active, often moving round in tandem. Females are thought to lay eggs in the stems of plants growing in the water while the males perch nearby, presumably to keep other males away. The larvae live on the gravelly bed of fast flowing streams with large nymphs, at the end of the dry season, climbing onto mid-stream rocks to emerge.
