= Epigomphus sulcatistyla =

Conservation status
- Endangered (IUCN 3.1)

Scientific classification
- Kingdom: Animalia
- Phylum: Arthropoda
- Clade: Pancrustacea
- Class: Insecta
- Order: Odonata
- Infraorder: Anisoptera
- Family: Gomphidae
- Genus: Epigomphus
- Species: E. sulcatistyla

Binomial name
- Epigomphus sulcatistyla Donnelly, 1989

Species of dragonfly

Epigomphus sulcatistyla is a species of dragonfly in the family Gomphidae. It has a reddish-brown head marked with pale olive-green, a light brown prothorax with a dark brown hind lobe, a reddish-brown and light-colored pterothorax marked with yellow stripes, and a dark brown abdomen. The terminal appendages are dark brown and the wings have black veins and dark reddish-brown pterostigma. The dragonfly is endemic to Mexico, where it is found only in Veracruz. It is inhabits lowland rainforest streams at elevations of 102–507 m.

== Taxonomy ==
Epigomphus sulcatistyla was formally described in 1989 by the American odonatologist Thomas Donnelly based on an adult male specimen collected from a stream in Coyame in Veracruz, Mexico. Specimens of E. sulcatistyla were previously incorrectly identified as E. paulsoni and included in that species paratypes.

== Description ==
In adult males, the head is reddish-brown, with a variety of pale olive-green markings on the labrum, postclypeus, mandibles, and frons. The prothorax is light brown with pale sides to the middle lobe and a dark brown hind lobe. The pterothorax is reddish-brown dorsally and light-colored ventrally, with a number of yellow stripes. The abdomen is dark brown above and has ten segments. The terminal appendages are dark reddish-brown. The wings have black veins and dark reddish-brown pterostigma. In the specimens of the type series, the abdominal length is 41 mm and the hind-wing length is 34–34.5 mm.

== Distribution and conservation ==
Epigomphus sulcatistyla is endemic to Mexico and is known only from the state of Veracruz, where it has been recorded from the municipalities of San Andrés Tuxtla and Catemaco. It inhabits lowland rainforest streams and has been recorded at elevations of 102–507 m. The species is classified as being endangered by the IUCN. It is threatened by ongoing deforestation.
