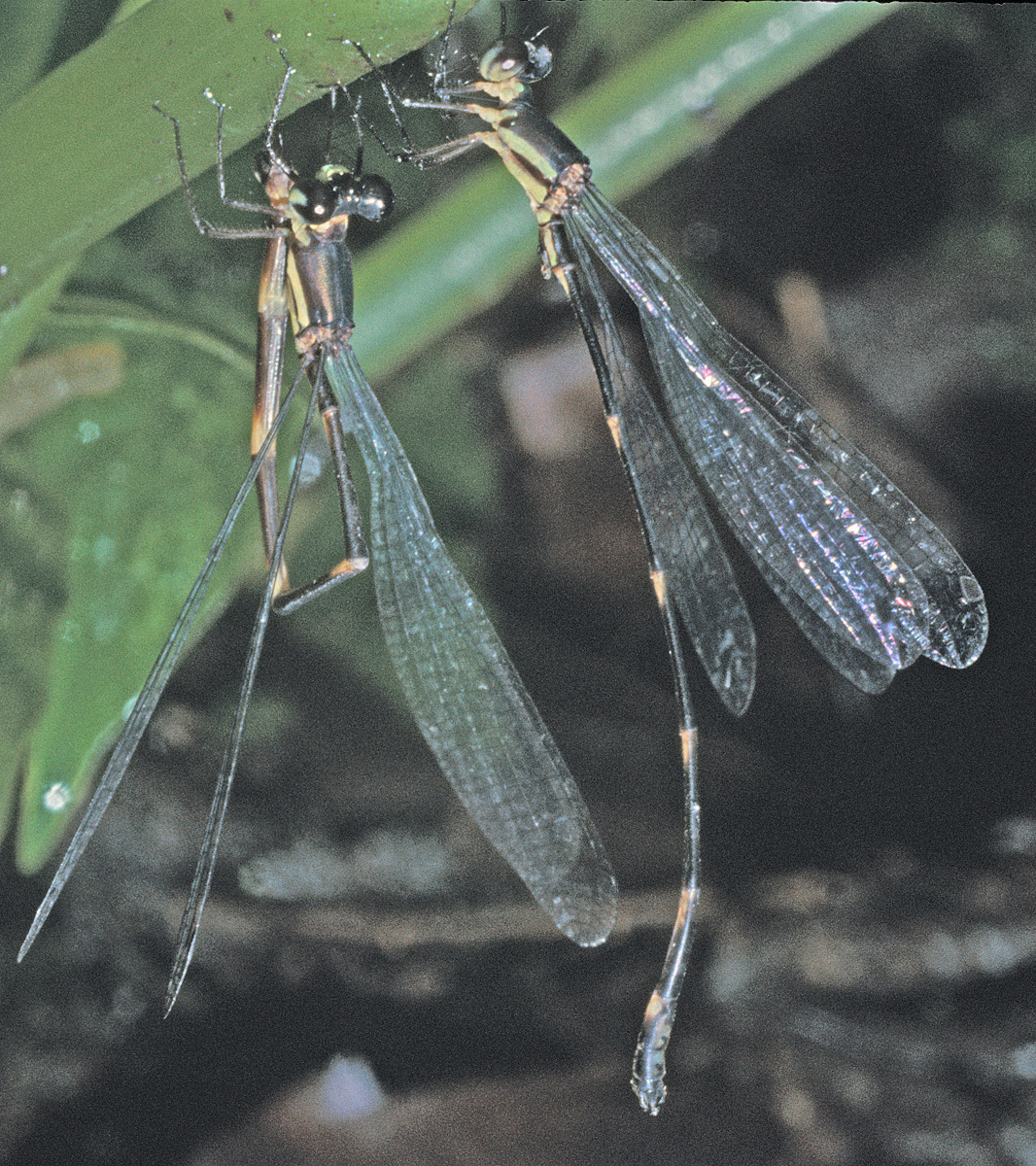
- Palaemnema chiriquita

Scientific classification
- Kingdom: Animalia
- Phylum: Arthropoda
- Clade: Pancrustacea
- Class: Insecta
- Order: Odonata
- Suborder: Zygoptera
- Family: Platystictidae
- Subfamily: Palaemnematinae; Tillyard & Fraser, 1938
- Genus: Palaemnema; Selys, 1860

Species
- See text

= Palaemnema =

Genus of damselflies

Palaemnema is a genus of damselflies in the family Platystictidae. It is the only genus in the subfamily Palaemnematinae. They are commonly known as shadowdamsels and are found in the New World, from Arizona to Peru and French Guiana.

== Characteristics ==
Members of this genus are quite diverse. They reside in dense shade near streamlets that trickle though tropical forests. The majority are black with blue markings, though some are entirely black. They mostly have a blue thorax and a blue tip to the abdomen and are similar in size to large pond damsels. The prothorax is large and the legs long. Males have forceps-shaped cerci (appendages at the tip of the abdomen).

== Species ==
The genus contains the following species:

- Palaemnema abbreviata Kennedy, 1938
- Palaemnema angelina Selys, 1860
- Palaemnema apicalis Navás, 1924
- Palaemnema azupizui Calvert, 1931
- Palaemnema baltodanoi Brooks, 1989 - Cacao shadowdamsel
- Palaemnema bilobulata Donnelly, 1992
- Palaemnema brasiliensis Machado, 2009
- Palaemnema brevignoni Machet, 1990
- Palaemnema brucei Calvert, 1931
- Palaemnema brucelli Kennedy, 1938
- Palaemnema carmelita Ris, 1918
- Palaemnema chiriquita Calvert, 1931 - Chiriquita shadowdamsel
- Palaemnema clementia Selys, 1886
- Palaemnema collaris Donnelly, 1992
- Palaemnema croceicauda Calvert, 1931
- Palaemnema cyclohamulata Donnelly, 1992
- Palaemnema dentata Donnelly, 1992
- Palaemnema desiderata Selys, 1886
- Palaemnema distadens Calvert, 1931
- Palaemnema domina Calvert, 1903 - Desert shadowdamsel
- Palaemnema edmondi Calvert, 1931
- Palaemnema gigantula Calvert, 1931 - Elongate shadowdamsel
- Palaemnema joanetta Kennedy, 1940
- Palaemnema lorena Kennedy, 1942
- Palaemnema martini Cowley, 1934
- Palaemnema melanocauda Kennedy, 1942
- Palaemnema melanostigma Hagen in Selys, 1860
- Palaemnema melanota Ris, 1918 - Black-backed shadowdamsel
- Palaemnema melanura Donnelly, 1992
- Palaemnema mutans Calvert, 1931
- Palaemnema nathalia Selys, 1886
- Palaemnema orientalis De Marmels, 1989
- Palaemnema paulicaxa Calvert, 1931
- Palaemnema paulicoba Calvert, 1931 - Cordoba shadowdamsel
- Palaemnema paulina (Drury, 1773)
- Palaemnema paulirica Calvert, 1931
- Palaemnema paulitaba Calvert, 1931
- Palaemnema paulitoyaca Calvert, 1931
- Palaemnema peruviana Ris, 1918
- Palaemnema picicaudata Kennedy, 1938
- Palaemnema reventazoni Calvert, 1931 - Reventazón shadowdamsel
- Palaemnema spinulata Donnelly, 1992
- Palaemnema tepuica De Marmels, 1989
