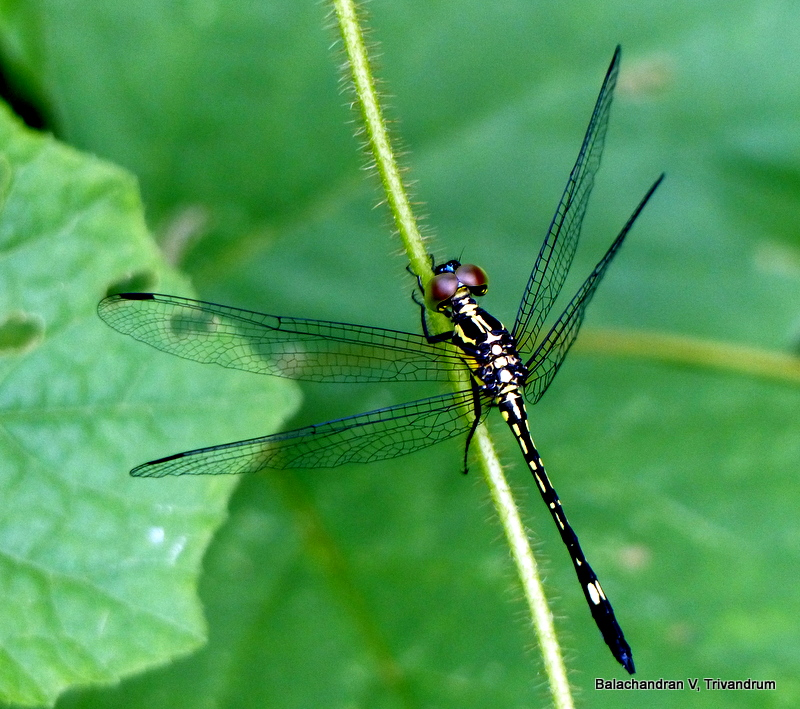
- Hylaeothemis indica

Scientific classification
- Kingdom: Animalia
- Phylum: Arthropoda
- Class: Insecta
- Order: Odonata
- Infraorder: Anisoptera
- Family: Libellulidae
- Subfamily: Tetrathemistinae
- Genus: Hylaeothemis; Ris, 1909

= Hylaeothemis =

Genus of dragonflies

Hylaeothemis is a genus of dragonflies in the family Libellulidae.

== Species ==
The genus contains the following species:

Male	Female	Scientific name	Common name	Distribution
		Hylaeothemis clementia Ris, 1909		Sarawak, Borneo
		Hylaeothemis fruhstorferi (Karsch, 1889)	Fruhstorfer's Junglewatcher	rare Sri Lankan endemic
		Hylaeothemis gardeneri Fraser, 1927		India
		Hylaeothemis apicalis Fraser, 1946		Western Ghats
