= Palaemnema reventazoni =

Conservation status
- Endangered (IUCN 3.1)

Scientific classification
- Kingdom: Animalia
- Phylum: Arthropoda
- Class: Insecta
- Order: Odonata
- Suborder: Zygoptera
- Family: Platystictidae
- Genus: Palaemnema
- Species: P. reventazoni

Binomial name
- Palaemnema reventazoni Calvert, 1931

Species of damselfly

Palaemnema reventazoni is a species of damselfly in the family Platystictidae. It is endemic to Costa Rica. Its natural habitats are subtropical or tropical moist lowland forests and rivers. It is threatened by habitat loss.
