= Epigomphus flinti =

Conservation status
- Endangered (IUCN 3.1)

Scientific classification
- Kingdom: Animalia
- Phylum: Arthropoda
- Clade: Pancrustacea
- Class: Insecta
- Order: Odonata
- Infraorder: Anisoptera
- Family: Gomphidae
- Genus: Epigomphus
- Species: E. flinti

Binomial name
- Epigomphus flinti Donnelly, 1989

Species of dragonfly

Epigomphus flinti is a species of dragonfly in the family Gomphidae. It has a reddish-brown head marked with pale olive-green, a pale reddish-brown prothorax with a dark brown hind lobe, a reddish-brown and light-colored pterothorax marked with yellow stripes, and a dark brown abdomen. The terminal appendages are dark brown and the wings have black veins and reddish-brown pterostigma. The dragonfly is endemic to Mexico, where it is found only in Oaxaca. It is thought to inhabit rocky streams in cloud forest.

== Taxonomy ==
Epigomphus flinti was formally described in 1989 by the American odonatologist Thomas Donnelly based on an adult male specimen collected from 8 kilometers south of the Valle Nacional River in Oaxaca, Mexico. It is named after Ollie Flint, an odanate collector who collected the holotype of this species.

== Description ==
In adult males, the head is reddish-brown, with a variety of pale olive-green markings on the labrum, postclypeus, mandibles, and frons. The prothorax is pale reddish-brown with yellow spotting on the middle lobe and a dark brown hind lobe. The pterothorax is reddish-brown dorsally and light-colored ventrally, with a number of yellow stripes. The abdomen is dark brown above and has ten segments. The terminal appendages are dark brown. The wings have black veins and reddish-brown pterostigma. In the specimens of the type series, the abdominal length is 39–42.5 mm and the hind-wing length is 32–35 mm.

== Distribution and conservation ==
Epigomphus flinti is endemic to Mexico and is known only from its type locality in Oaxaca. It is thought to inhabit rocky streams like other members of its genus and seems to live in cloud forest. The species is classified as being endangered by the IUCN. There is very little information available on the species' population or habitat, but the cloud forests it lives in are amongst the rarest habitats in the country and face ongoing deforestation.
