= Epigomphus maya =

Conservation status
- Endangered (IUCN 3.1)

Scientific classification
- Kingdom: Animalia
- Phylum: Arthropoda
- Clade: Pancrustacea
- Class: Insecta
- Order: Odonata
- Infraorder: Anisoptera
- Family: Gomphidae
- Genus: Epigomphus
- Species: E. maya

Binomial name
- Epigomphus maya Donnelly, 1989

Species of dragonfly

Epigomphus maya, the Maya knobtail, is a species of dragonfly in the family Gomphidae. It has a reddish-brown head marked with pale olive-green, a pale brown prothorax, a reddish-brown and pale yellow pterothorax marked with yellow stripes, and a dark brown abdomen. The terminal appendages are reddish-brown with black apices and the wings have black veins and pterostigma. The dragonfly is endemic to Belize, where it is found only in fast-flowing, permanent creeks in the pine forests of the Maya Mountains. It has been recorded from Mountain Pine Ridge Forest Reserve and the Mullins River in the districts of Cayo and Stann Creek.

== Taxonomy ==
Epigomphus maya was formally described in 1989 by the American odonatologist Thomas Donnelly based on an adult male specimen collected from the Mountain Pine Ridge Forest Reserve in Cayo District, Belize. It is named after the Maya Mountains in which it is found. It has the common name Maya knobtail.

== Description ==
In adult males, the head is reddish-brown, with a variety of pale olive-green markings on the labrum, postclypeus, mandibles, and frons. The prothorax is pale brown with faint blotching. The pterothorax is reddish-brown dorsally and pale yellow ventrally, with a number of yellow stripes. The abdomen is dark brown above and has ten segments. The terminal appendages are reddish-brown with black apices. The wings have black veins and pterostigma. In the three specimens of the type series, the abdominal length is 39–41 mm and the hind-wing length is 34–35 mm.

== Distribution and conservation ==
One of two species of gomphids endemic to Belize, Epigomphus maya is known only from Mountain Pine Ridge and the Mullins River in the districts of Cayo and Stann Creek. It inhabits clean, fast-flowing, permanent creeks in pine forests. These streams can be sand-and-gravel bottomed, flowing over coarse granitic bedrock, or mud-and-sand bottomed, flowing over sedimentary bedrock. The species is classified as being endangered by the IUCN due to its small range, which is undergoing ongoing deforestation.
