= Epigomphus clavatus =

Conservation status
- Endangered (IUCN 3.1)

Scientific classification
- Kingdom: Animalia
- Phylum: Arthropoda
- Clade: Pancrustacea
- Class: Insecta
- Order: Odonata
- Suborder: Anisoptera
- Family: Gomphidae
- Genus: Epigomphus
- Species: E. clavatus

Binomial name
- Epigomphus clavatus Belle, 1980

Species of dragonfly

Epigomphus clavatus, the Guatemalan knobtail, is a species of dragonfly in the family Gomphidae. It has a dark brown head marked with grayish-green or yellow, a dark brown prothorax, a dark brown pterothorax marked with a number of greenish stripes, and a dark brown abdomen. The dragonfly is found in Guatemala and Mexico, from Alta Verapaz to Chiapas, where it inhabits forest streams at elevations of up to 1,480 m (4,860 ft). It is classified as being endangered by the IUCN.

== Taxonomy ==
Epigomphus clavatus was formally described in 1980 by the Dutch odonatologist Jean Belle based on an adult male specimen collected from Finca Sacté near Cobán, in the department of Alta Verapaz, Guatemala. It has the English common name Guatemalan knobtail. It is thought to be part of a group comprising Epigomphus armatus, E. subobtusus, and E. crepidus.

== Description ==
In adult males, the head is dark brown, with a variety of pale grayish-green or yellow markings on the labrum, postclypeus, mandibles, and frons. The prothorax is dark brown with green spots on the sides and back. The pterothorax is dark brown with a number of greenish stripes. The abdomen is dark brown and has ten segments, with olive or yellow markings. The wings have blackish-brown veins and pterostigma. In the holotype male, the abdominal length is 43 mm, the hind-wing length is 37.5 mm, and the total length is 55 mm.

== Distribution and conservation ==
Epigomphus clavatus is known from Guatemala and Mexico. Although it has been recorded from only two localities, Cobán in Guatemala and Lagunas de Montebello in Chiapas, it may also occur in forested regions between the two. It inhabits streams in forests at elevations of up to 1,480 m (4,860 ft). The species has a total range that is estimated to be less than 1,000 km². The species is classified as being endangered by the IUCN due to its small range, which has undergone extensive deforestation.
