= Epigomphus donnellyi =

Conservation status
- Endangered (IUCN 3.1)

Scientific classification
- Kingdom: Animalia
- Phylum: Arthropoda
- Class: Insecta
- Order: Odonata
- Infraorder: Anisoptera
- Family: Gomphidae
- Genus: Epigomphus
- Species: E. donnellyi

Binomial name
- Epigomphus donnellyi González & Cook, 1988

Species of dragonfly

Epigomphus donnellyi is a species of dragonfly in the family Gomphidae. It is endemic to Mexico, where it inhabits the Sierra de los Tuxtlas of southern Veracruz state. Its natural habitats are subtropical or tropical moist lowland forests and rivers. It is threatened by habitat loss.
