= Epigomphus houghtoni =

Conservation status
- Endangered (IUCN 3.1)

Scientific classification
- Kingdom: Animalia
- Phylum: Arthropoda
- Clade: Pancrustacea
- Class: Insecta
- Order: Odonata
- Infraorder: Anisoptera
- Family: Gomphidae
- Genus: Epigomphus
- Species: E. houghtoni

Binomial name
- Epigomphus houghtoni Brooks, 1989

Species of dragonfly

Epigomphus houghtoni, also known as the Limón knobtail, is a species of dragonfly in the family Gomphidae. It has a dark brown prothorax, a black and dark brown pterothorax marked with a number of green and yellow stripes and spots, and a black abdomen with yellow stripes and spots. The dragonfly is endemic to Costa Rica, where it is known only from one specimen collected from the province of Limón. It is classified as being endangered by the IUCN.

== Taxonomy ==
Epigomphus houghtoni was formally described in 1989 by the odonatologist Stephen Brooks based on an adult male specimen collected from near Siquirres in Limón Province, Costa Rica. It is named after Greg Houghton, a companion of the collector who collected the type specimen. It has the English common name Limón knobtail. It is thought to be most closely related to Epigomphus occipitalis group.

== Description ==
In adult males, the head has a black labrum, dark brown postclypeus, yellow-green labium, and brown and yellow-green frons. The prothorax is dark brown with green spots on the middle lobe. The pterothorax is black and dark brown with a number of green and yellow stripes and spots. The abdomen is black and has ten segments, with yellow stripes and spots. The wings have red-brown pterostigma and black veins. In the holotype male, the abdominal length is 39.5 mm, the hind-wing length is 34.5 mm and the total length is 53.6 mm.

== Distribution and conservation ==
Endemic to Costa Rica, Epigomphus houghtoni is known from only from the type specimen, which was collected in the Limón Province. It likely has a wider range in lowland Central America, stretching as far as perhaps Panama and Nicaragua, but has not been recorded subsequent to its description. The species is classified as being of endangered by the IUCN as most of its likely range has suffered from extensive deforestation.
