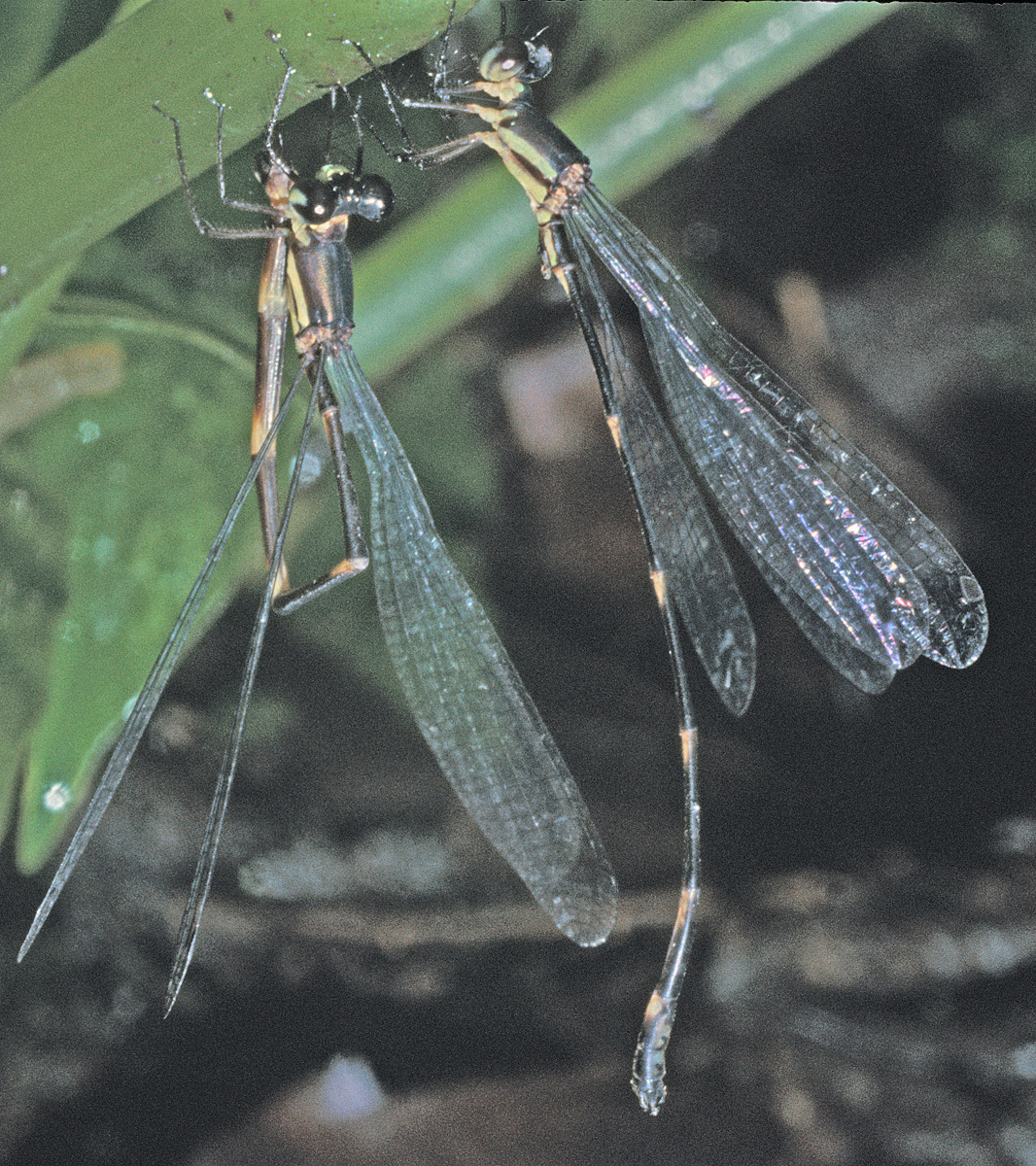

Conservation status
- Endangered (IUCN 3.1)

Scientific classification
- Kingdom: Animalia
- Phylum: Arthropoda
- Clade: Pancrustacea
- Class: Insecta
- Order: Odonata
- Suborder: Zygoptera
- Family: Platystictidae
- Genus: Palaemnema
- Species: P. chiriquita

Binomial name
- Palaemnema chiriquita Calvert, 1931

= Palaemnema chiriquita =

Species of damselfly

Palaemnema chiriquita is a species of damselfly in the family Platystictidae. It is endemic to Costa Rica. Its natural habitats are subtropical or tropical moist lowland forests and rivers. It is threatened by habitat loss.
