= Epigomphus verticicornis =

Conservation status
- Endangered (IUCN 3.1)

Scientific classification
- Kingdom: Animalia
- Phylum: Arthropoda
- Class: Insecta
- Order: Odonata
- Infraorder: Anisoptera
- Family: Gomphidae
- Genus: Epigomphus
- Species: E. verticicornis

Binomial name
- Epigomphus verticicornis Calvert, 1908

Synonyms
- Epigomphus verticornis Calvert, 1908 [orth. error]

Species of dragonfly

Epigomphus verticicornis is a species of dragonfly in the family Gomphidae. It is endemic to Costa Rica. Its natural habitats are subtropical or tropical moist lowland forests and rivers. It is threatened by habitat loss.
