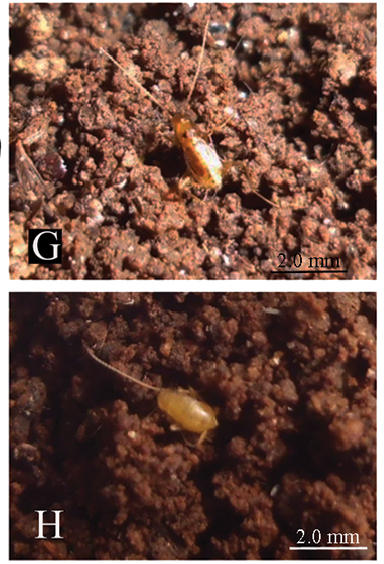
- Nocticola gonzalezi male (top) and female (bottom)

Scientific classification
- Domain: Eukaryota
- Kingdom: Animalia
- Phylum: Arthropoda
- Class: Insecta
- Order: Blattodea
- Family: Nocticolidae
- Genus: Nocticola; Bolívar, 1892

= Nocticola =

Genus of cockroaches

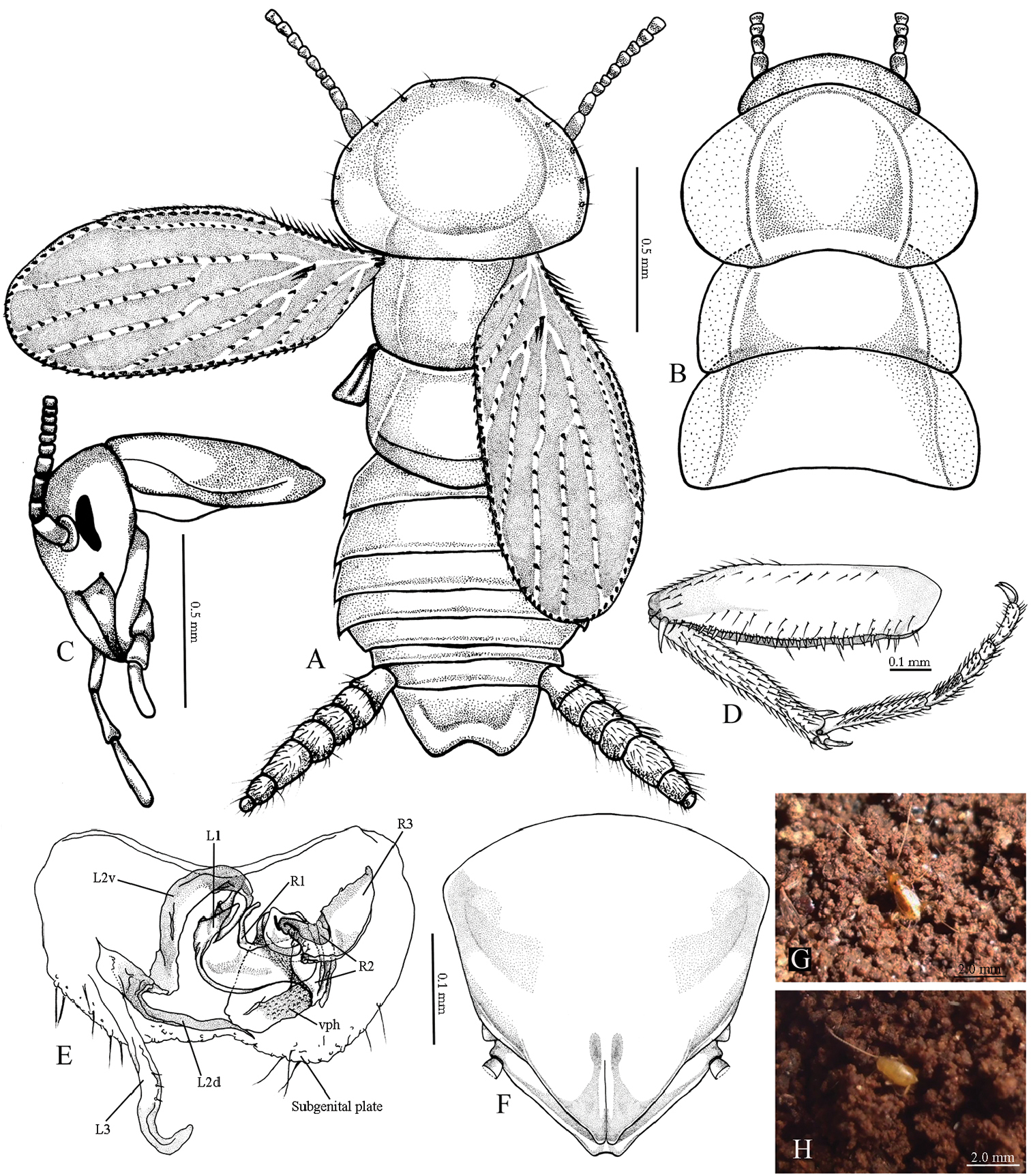
Illustration

Nocticola is a genus of cockroaches in the family Nocticolidae distributed in Africa, south-east Asia and Australia. Nocticola are different from every other cockroach in that they are not infected with Blattabacterium cuenoti. This makes them the only genus in Blattodea that do not have the bacteria.

== Species ==
There are currently 25 known species:

- Nocticola adebratti
- Nocticola australiensis
- Nocticola babindaensis
- Nocticola bolivari
- Nocticola brooksi
- Nocticola caeca
- Nocticola clavata
- Nocticola cockingi
- Nocticola currani
- Nocticola decaryi
- Nocticola flabella
- Nocticola gerlachi: Gerlach's cockroach (endangered)
- Nocticola gonzalezi
- Nocticola jodarlingtonae
- Nocticola leleupi
- Nocticola pheromosa
- Nocticola quartermainei
- Nocticola remyi
- Nocticola rohini
- Nocticola scytala
- Nocticola simoni
- Nocticola sinensis
- Nocticola termitophila
- Nocticola uenoi
- Nocticola wliensis
