= Palaemnema baltodanoi =

Conservation status
- Endangered (IUCN 3.1)

Scientific classification
- Kingdom: Animalia
- Phylum: Arthropoda
- Class: Insecta
- Order: Odonata
- Suborder: Zygoptera
- Family: Platystictidae
- Genus: Palaemnema
- Species: P. baltodanoi

Binomial name
- Palaemnema baltodanoi Brooks, 1989

Species of damselfly

Palaemnema baltodanoi is a species of damselfly in the family Platystictidae. It is endemic to Costa Rica. Its natural habitats are subtropical or tropical moist lowland forests and rivers. It is threatened by habitat loss.
