= Palaemnema melanota =

Conservation status
- Endangered (IUCN 3.1)

Scientific classification
- Kingdom: Animalia
- Phylum: Arthropoda
- Class: Insecta
- Order: Odonata
- Suborder: Zygoptera
- Family: Platystictidae
- Genus: Palaemnema
- Species: P. melanota

Binomial name
- Palaemnema melanota Ris, 1918

Species of damselfly

Palaemnema melanota is a species of damselfly in the family Platystictidae. It is endemic to Costa Rica. Its natural habitats are subtropical or tropical moist lowland forests and rivers. It is threatened by habitat loss.
