= Throscodectes xederoides =

Conservation status
- Endangered (IUCN 2.3)

Scientific classification
- Domain: Eukaryota
- Kingdom: Animalia
- Phylum: Arthropoda
- Class: Insecta
- Order: Orthoptera
- Suborder: Ensifera
- Family: Tettigoniidae
- Genus: Throscodectes
- Species: T. xederoides

Binomial name
- Throscodectes xederoides Rentz, 1985

Species of cricket-like animal

Throscodectes xederoides is a species of insect in family Tettigoniidae. It is endemic to Australia.
