= Epigomphus corniculatus =

Conservation status
- Endangered (IUCN 3.1)

Scientific classification
- Kingdom: Animalia
- Phylum: Arthropoda
- Clade: Pancrustacea
- Class: Insecta
- Order: Odonata
- Suborder: Anisoptera
- Family: Gomphidae
- Genus: Epigomphus
- Species: E. corniculatus

Binomial name
- Epigomphus corniculatus Belle, 1989

Species of dragonfly

Epigomphus corniculatus, the horned knobtail, is a species of dragonfly in the family Gomphidae. It has a dark brown head marked with pale grayish to greenish, a dark brown prothorax, a dark brown pterothorax marked with a number of grayish-green stripes, and a dark brown abdomen. The dragonfly is endemic to Costa Rica, where it is found in streams in lowland rainforests in the province of Limón. It is classified as being endangered by the IUCN.

== Taxonomy ==
Epigomphus corniculatus was formally described in 1989 by the Dutch odonatologist Jean Belle based on an adult male specimen collected from near Suretka in Limón Province, Costa Rica. It has the English common name horned knobtail. It is thought to be most closely related to Epigomphus armatus.

== Description ==
In adult males, the head is dark brown, with a variety of pale grayish to greenish markings on the labrum, postclypeus, mandibles, and frons. The prothorax is dark brown with greenish-yellow sides and central back on the middle lobe. The pterothorax is dark brown with a number of grayish-green stripes. The abdomen is dark brown and has ten segments, with pale greenish-yellow stripes and spots on the first eight. Females are broadly similar to males in appearance, but with slight differences in coloration. Like other Costa Rican endemic Epigomphus, E. corniculatus females have a unique pair of postocellar "horns". In the holotype male, the abdominal length is 41.5 mm, the hind-wing length is 34 mm and the total length is 54 mm. In the allotype female, the abdominal length is 43 mm, the hind-wing length is 39 mm and the total length is 57 mm.

== Distribution and conservation ==
Endemic to Costa Rica, Epigomphus corniculatus is known from the province of Limón. It inhabits streams in lowland rainforests at elevations of around 60 m (200 ft). The species has a total range that is estimated to be less than 1,000 km². The species is classified as being endangered by the IUCN due to its small range, which has undergone extensive deforestation.
