= Epigomphus subsimilis =

Conservation status
- Endangered (IUCN 3.1)

Scientific classification
- Kingdom: Animalia
- Phylum: Arthropoda
- Class: Insecta
- Order: Odonata
- Infraorder: Anisoptera
- Family: Gomphidae
- Genus: Epigomphus
- Species: E. subsimilis

Binomial name
- Epigomphus subsimilis Calvert, 1920

Species of dragonfly

Epigomphus subsimilis is a species of dragonfly in the family Gomphidae. It is endemic to Costa Rica. Its natural habitats are subtropical or tropical moist lowland forests and rivers. It is threatened by habitat loss.
