= Graptodytes delectus =

Conservation status
- Endangered (IUCN 2.3)

Scientific classification
- Kingdom: Animalia
- Phylum: Arthropoda
- Clade: Pancrustacea
- Class: Insecta
- Order: Coleoptera
- Suborder: Adephaga
- Family: Dytiscidae
- Genus: Graptodytes
- Species: G. delectus

Binomial name
- Graptodytes delectus Wollaston, 1864

Species of beetle

Graptodytes delectus is a species of beetle in family Dytiscidae. It is endemic to Spain.
