= Sciotropis lattkei =

Conservation status
- Endangered (IUCN 3.1)

Scientific classification
- Kingdom: Animalia
- Phylum: Arthropoda
- Class: Insecta
- Order: Odonata
- Suborder: Zygoptera
- Genus: Sciotropis
- Species: S. lattkei

Binomial name
- Sciotropis lattkei De Marmels, 1994

Species of damselfly

Sciotropis lattkei is a species of damselfly in the family Megapodagrionidae. It is endemic to Venezuela. Its natural habitats are subtropical or tropical moist lowland forests and rivers. It is threatened by habitat loss.
