= Epigomphus westfalli =

Conservation status
- Endangered (IUCN 3.1)

Scientific classification
- Kingdom: Animalia
- Phylum: Arthropoda
- Clade: Pancrustacea
- Class: Insecta
- Order: Odonata
- Infraorder: Anisoptera
- Family: Gomphidae
- Genus: Epigomphus
- Species: E. westfalli

Binomial name
- Epigomphus westfalli Donnelly, 1986

Species of dragonfly

Epigomphus westfalli, also known as Westfall's knobtail, is a species of dragonfly in the family Gomphidae. It has a reddish-brown head marked with pale olive-green, a reddish-brown prothorax, a reddish-brown and light-colored pterothorax marked with yellow stripes, and a dark brown abdomen. The appendages are reddish-brown and the wings have black veins and dark reddish-brown pterostigma. The dragonfly is endemic to Nicaragua, where it is found in the departments of Matagalpa and Jinotega. It inhabits small forest creeks in both relict and primary rainforest at elevations of 700–1,250 m (2,300–4,100 ft).

== Taxonomy ==
Epigomphus westfalli was formally described in 1986 by the American odonatologist Thomas Donnelly based on an adult male specimen collected from a stream near San Ramón in Matagalpa Department, Belize. It is named after Minter J. Westfall Jr., a leading American odonatologist. It has the English common name Westfall's knobtail.

== Description ==
In adult males, the head is reddish-brown, with a variety of pale olive-green markings on the labrum, postclypeus, mandibles, and frons. The prothorax is reddish-brown with some yellow spots on the hind and middle lobes. The pterothorax is reddish-brown dorsally and light-colored ventrally, with a number of yellow stripes. The abdomen is dark brown above and has ten segments. The appendages are reddish-brown with dark apices. The wings have black veins and reddish-brown pterostigma. In the male specimens of the type series, the abdominal length is 42 mm and the hind-wing length is 36–36.5 mm. In the two female specimens, the abdominal length is 46 mm and the hind-wing length is 38.5–39 mm.

== Distribution and conservation ==
Endemic to Nicaragua, Epigomphus westfalli is known from three localities in the departments of Matagalpa and Jinotega: around 10 km southeast of the municipality of San Ramón, Hotel Selva Negra near the municipality of Matagalpa, and Cerro Kilambé Natural Reserve. It inhabits small forest creeks in both relict and primary rainforest at elevations of 700–1,250 m (2,300–4,100 ft). Despite the known localities being spaced fairly far apart, the species has a total range that is estimated to be less than 1,000 km². The species is classified as being endangered by the IUCN due to its fairly small range, which is undergoing ongoing deforestation and possible overgrazing.
