= Epigomphus crepidus =

Conservation status
- Data Deficient (IUCN 3.1)

Scientific classification
- Kingdom: Animalia
- Phylum: Arthropoda
- Class: Insecta
- Order: Odonata
- Infraorder: Anisoptera
- Family: Gomphidae
- Genus: Epigomphus
- Species: E. crepidus

Binomial name
- Epigomphus crepidus Kennedy, 1936

Species of dragonfly

Epigomphus crepidus is a species of dragonfly in the family Gomphidae. It is endemic to Mexico, where it inhabits the Pacific slope of southern Mexico in the states of Nayarit and Oaxaca. Its natural habitats are subtropical or tropical moist lowland forests and rivers. It is threatened by habitat loss.
