= Hylaeothemis fruhstorferi =

Conservation status
- Endangered (IUCN 3.1)

Scientific classification
- Kingdom: Animalia
- Phylum: Arthropoda
- Class: Insecta
- Order: Odonata
- Infraorder: Anisoptera
- Family: Libellulidae
- Genus: Hylaeothemis
- Species: H. fruhstorferi

Binomial name
- Hylaeothemis fruhstorferi (Karsch, 1889)

Species of dragonfly

Hylaeothemis fruhstorferi is a species of dragonfly in the family Libellulidae. It is endemic to Sri Lanka. Its natural habitats are subtropical or tropical moist lowland forests and rivers. It is threatened by habitat loss.
