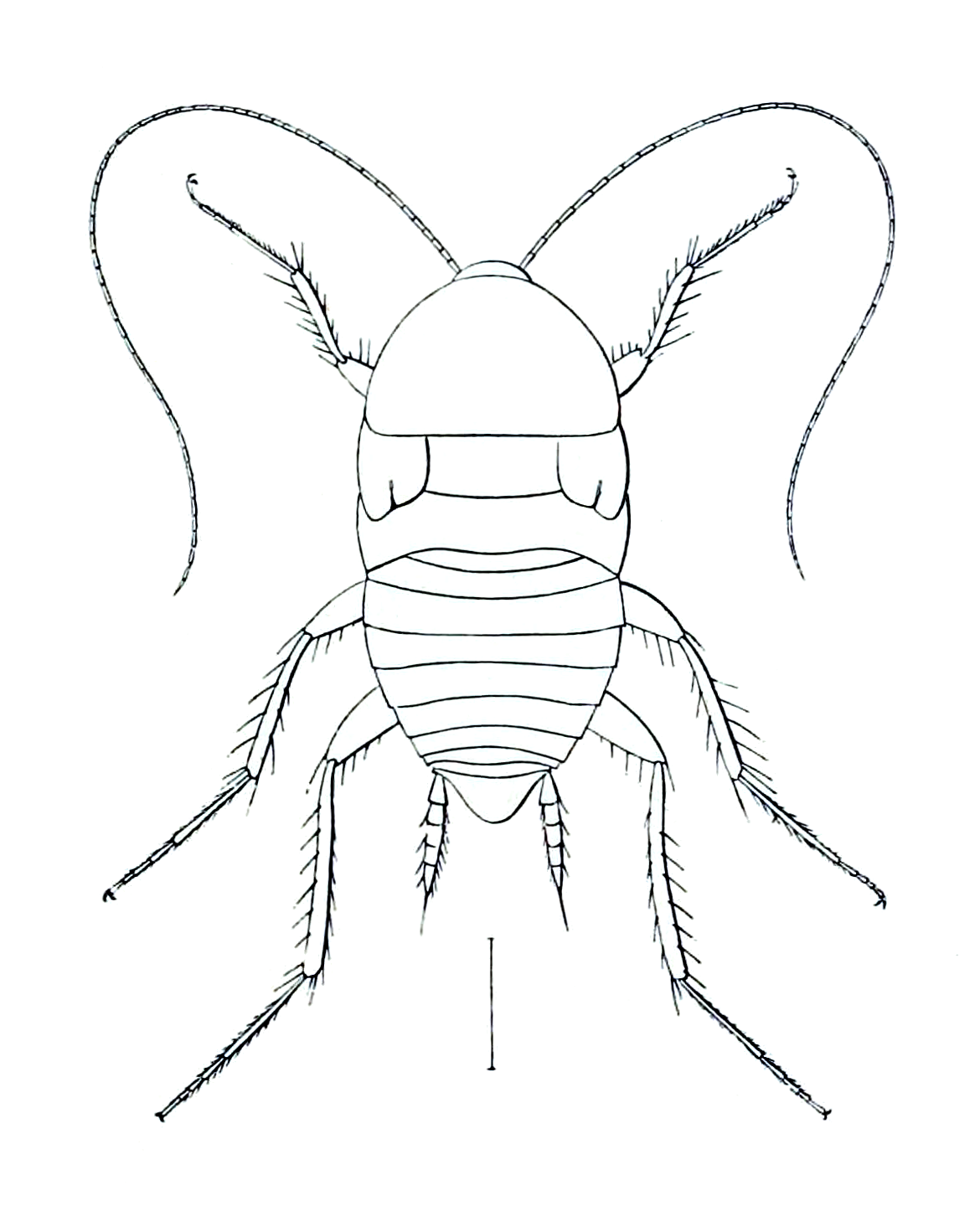
- Spelaeoblatta gestroi

Scientific classification
- Kingdom: Animalia
- Phylum: Arthropoda
- Clade: Pancrustacea
- Class: Insecta
- Order: Blattodea
- Superfamily: Corydioidea
- Family: Nocticolidae

= Nocticolidae =

Nocticolidae Temporal range: Cenomanian–Present

Family of cockroaches

Nocticolidae is a small family in the order Blattodea (cockroaches). It consists of only 32 known species in 9 genera. They are found in Africa, Asia and Australia. Most live in cave habitats, although a few are associated with termites. Cave adapted species are known from the Cenomanian aged Burmese amber, making them the oldest extant cavernicolous organisms.

== Genera ==
The family includes the following genera:

- Alluaudellina Chopard, 1932
- Cardacopsis Karny, 1924
- Cardacus Strand, 1928
- Metanocticola Roth, 1999
- Nocticola Bolívar, 1892
- Pholeosilpha Chopard, 1958
- Spelaeoblatta Bolívar, 1897
- Typhloblatta Chopard, 1924
- Typhloblattodes Chopard, 1946
- †Crenocticola Li and Huang, 2019 – Burmese amber, Cenomanian
- †Mulleriblattina Sendi et al, 2020 – Burmese amber, Cenomanian
