= Epigomphus paulsoni =

Conservation status
- Endangered (IUCN 3.1)

Scientific classification
- Kingdom: Animalia
- Phylum: Arthropoda
- Class: Insecta
- Order: Odonata
- Infraorder: Anisoptera
- Family: Gomphidae
- Genus: Epigomphus
- Species: E. paulsoni

Binomial name
- Epigomphus paulsoni Belle, 1981

Species of dragonfly

Epigomphus paulsoni is a species of dragonfly in the family Gomphidae. It is endemic to Mexico's Chiapas state. Its natural habitats are subtropical or tropical moist lowland forests and rivers. It is threatened by habitat loss.
