= Epigomphus =

Scientific classification
- Kingdom: Animalia
- Phylum: Arthropoda
- Class: Insecta
- Order: Odonata
- Infraorder: Anisoptera
- Family: Gomphidae
- Genus: Epigomphus; Hagen in Selys, 1854

Type species
- Epigomphus paludosus Hagen in Selys, 1854

Synonyms
- Eugomphus Kennedy, 1946

Genus of dragonflies

Epigomphus is a genus of dragonflies in the family Gomphidae. They are commonly known as knobtails.

The genus contains the following species:

- Epigomphus armatus Ris, 1918
- Epigomphus camelus Calvert, 1905 – Humped Knobtail
- Epigomphus clavatus Belle, 1980 – Guatemalan Knobtail
- Epigomphus compactus Belle, 1994
- Epigomphus corniculatus Belle, 1989 – Horned Knobtail
- Epigomphus crepidus Kennedy, 1936 – West Mexican Knobtail
- Epigomphus donnellyi González & Cook, 1988 – Donnelly's Knobtail
- Epigomphus echeverrii Brooks, 1989 – Volcano Knobtail
- Epigomphus flinti Donnelly, 1989 – Flint's Knobtail
- Epigomphus gibberosus Belle, 1988
- Epigomphus houghtoni Brooks, 1989 – Limón Knobtail
- Epigomphus hylaeus Ris, 1918
- Epigomphus jannyae Belle, 1993
- Epigomphus llama Calvert, 1903
- Epigomphus maya Donnelly, 1989 – Maya Knobtail
- Epigomphus morrisoni Haber, 2017
- Epigomphus obtusus Selys, 1869
- Epigomphus occipitalis Belle, 1970
- Epigomphus paludosus Hagen in Selys, 1854
- Epigomphus paulsoni Belle, 1981 – Paulson's Knobtail
- Epigomphus pechumani Belle, 1970
- Epigomphus quadracies Calvert, 1903
- Epigomphus subobtusus Selys, 1878
- Epigomphus subquadrices Kennedy, 1946
- Epigomphus subsimilis Calvert, 1929 – Alajuela Knobtail
- Epigomphus sulcatistyla Donnelly, 1989 – Tuxtla Knobtail
- Epigomphus tumefactus Calvert, 1903
- Epigomphus verticicornis Calvert, 1908 – Cartago Knobtail
- Epigomphus wagneri Haber, 2017
- Epigomphus westfalli Donnelly, 1986 – Westfall's Knobtail
