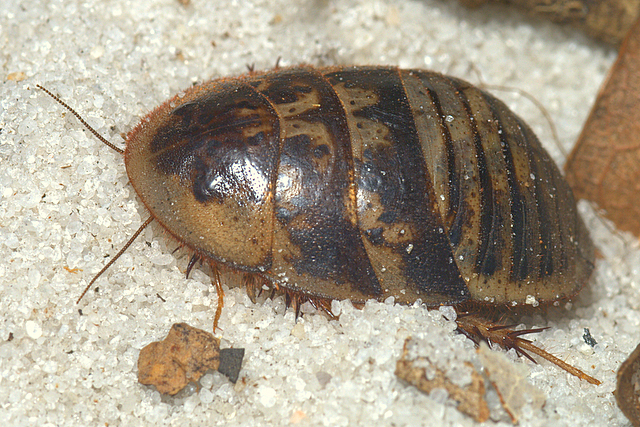

Scientific classification
- Kingdom: Animalia
- Phylum: Arthropoda
- Clade: Pancrustacea
- Class: Insecta
- Order: Blattodea
- Family: Corydiidae
- Genus: Arenivaga
- Species: A. floridensis

Binomial name
- Arenivaga floridensis Caudell, 1918

= Arenivaga floridensis =

Species of cockroach

Arenivaga floridensis is a species of sand cockroaches of the subfamily Corydiinae, in the family Corydiidae. It is a fossorial insect endemic to Florida scrub habitats in Highlands, Pinellas, and Polk counties in peninsular Florida.

== Sources ==
- Lamb, T., Justice, T.C. & Justice, M. 2006. Distribution and Status of the Cockroach Arenivaga floridensis Caudell, a Florida Sand Ridge Endemic. Southeastern Naturalist 5: 587–598
