= Desert cockroach =

Desert cockroach may refer to:

- Arenivaga investigata, also known as a desert cockroach
- Therea petiveriana, also referred to as a desert cockroach found in southern India
