= Oreocalamus =

Oreocalamus may refer to:

- Oreocalamus (plant), a genus of plants in the family Poaceae
- Oreocalamus (snake), a genus of reptiles in the family Colubridae
