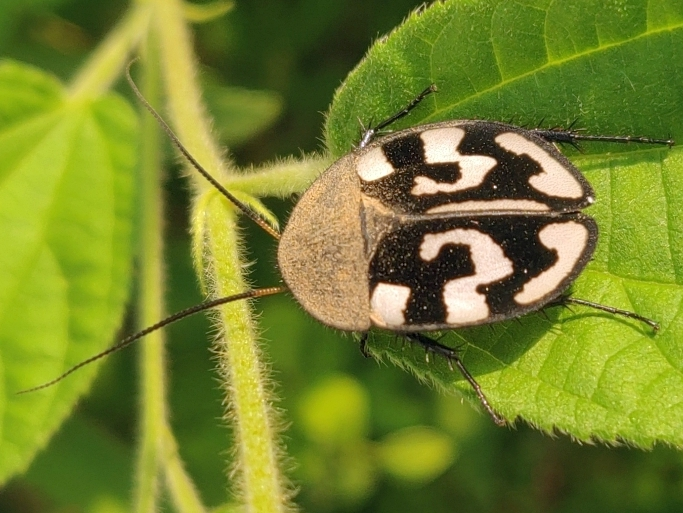

Scientific classification
- Kingdom: Animalia
- Phylum: Arthropoda
- Clade: Pancrustacea
- Class: Insecta
- Order: Blattodea
- Family: Corydiidae
- Genus: Therea
- Species: T. olegrandjeani

Binomial name
- Therea olegrandjeani Fritzsche & Zompro, 2008

= Therea olegrandjeani =

Species of cockroach

Therea olegrandjeani sometimes known as the question-mark cockroach for their conspicuous markings is a species of cockroach found in India. The species was described based on a specimen collected from Gooty and the species is known from the Telangana and Andhra Pradesh regions. It is also popular among pet insect keepers around the world.
