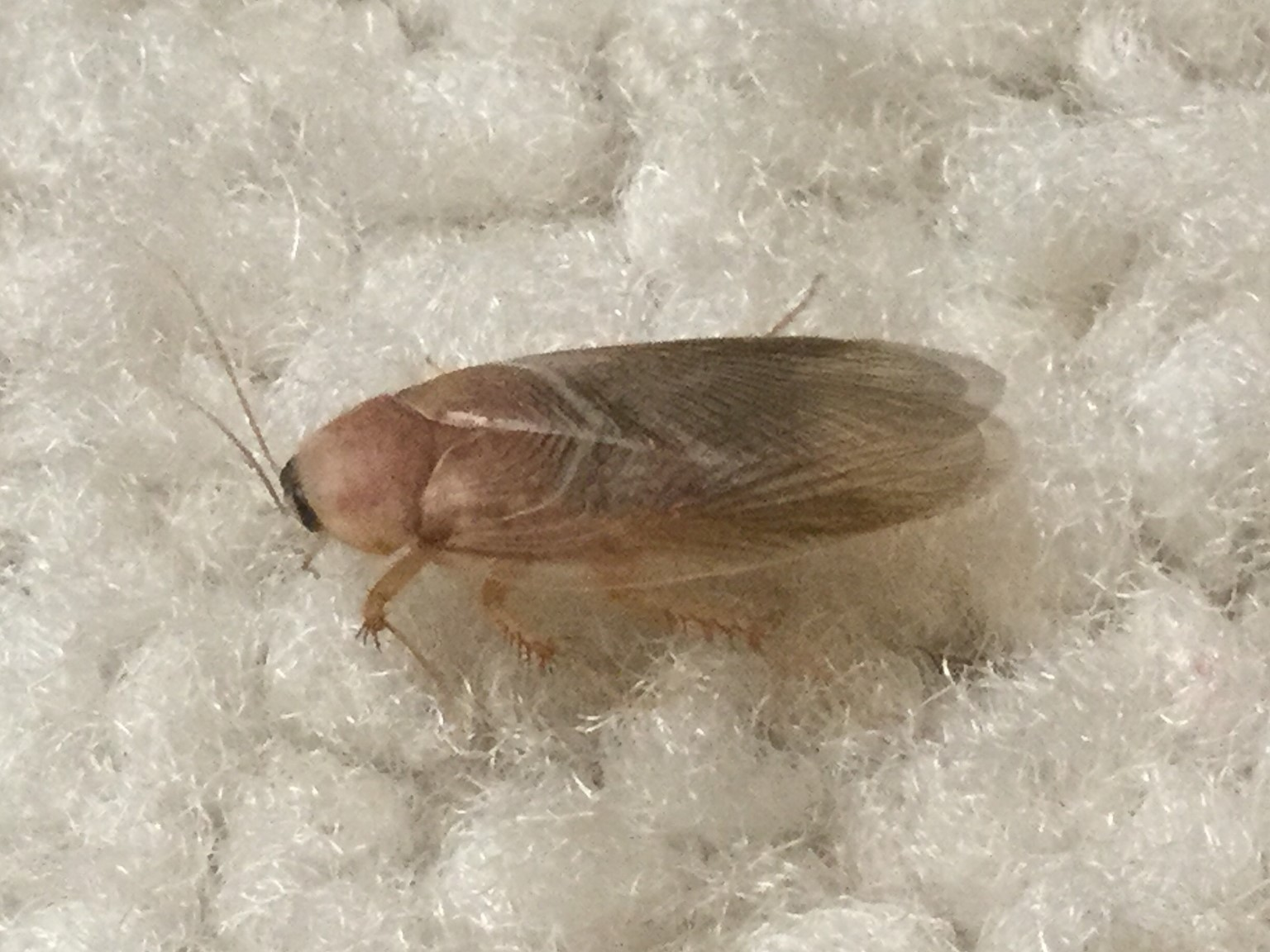

Scientific classification
- Kingdom: Animalia
- Phylum: Arthropoda
- Clade: Pancrustacea
- Class: Insecta
- Order: Blattodea
- Family: Corydiidae
- Genus: Eremoblatta
- Species: E. subdiaphana

Binomial name
- Eremoblatta subdiaphana (Scudder, 1902)

= Eremoblatta subdiaphana =

Species of cockroach

Eremoblatta subdiaphana, the hairy desert cockroach, is a species of cockroach in the family Corydiidae. It is found in North America.
