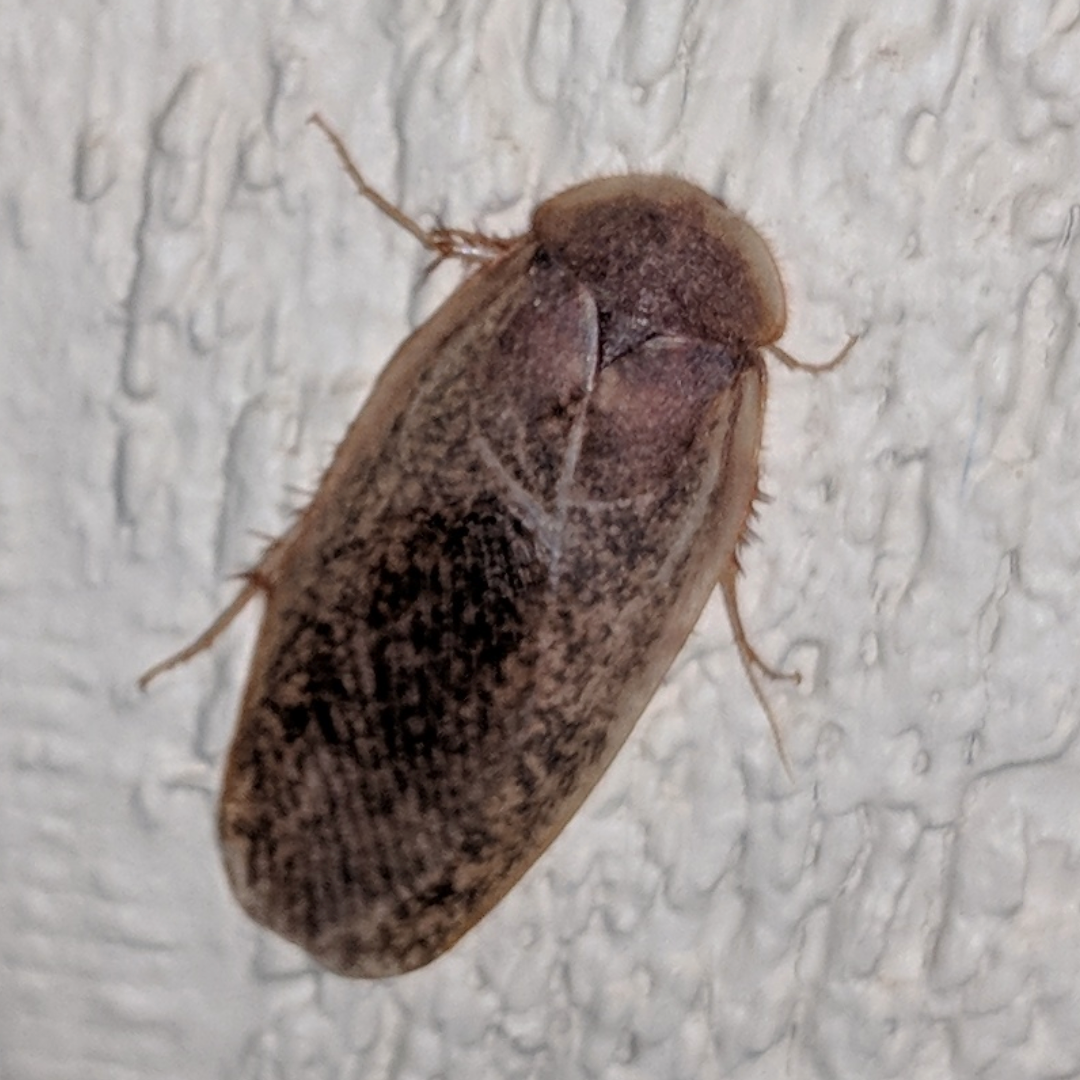

Scientific classification
- Kingdom: Animalia
- Phylum: Arthropoda
- Clade: Pancrustacea
- Class: Insecta
- Order: Blattodea
- Family: Corydiidae
- Genus: Arenivaga
- Species: A. apacha

Binomial name
- Arenivaga apacha (Saussure, 1893)

= Arenivaga apacha =

Species of cockroach

Arenivaga apacha, the Apache sand cockroach, is a species of cockroach in the family Corydiidae. It is found in North America.
