= Ipisoma =

Scientific classification
- Kingdom: Animalia
- Phylum: Arthropoda
- Class: Insecta
- Order: Blattodea
- Family: Corydiidae
- Genus: Ipisoma
- Species: I. coleoptratum

Binomial name
- Ipisoma coleoptratum Bolívar, 1893

Genus of cockroach

Ipisoma coleoptratum is a species of cockroach in the family Corydiidae. It is the only species in the monotypic genus Ipisoma, and has been recorded from Africa.

== Taxonomy and systematics ==
The genus is placed near the genus Latindia due to its very widely separated eyes. The pronotum, truncated posteriorly, leaves the scutellum exposed. The elytra are notably shorter than the abdomen, opaque, with veins that are weakly marked, resembling irregular longitudinal folds, and appear roughened. The membranous part of the right elytron is almost absent and is traversed by abnormal, arched, fairly robust veins. The abdomen narrows abruptly posteriorly.

== Description ==
The body is oblong, depressed, and sparsely hairy, measuring 5 mm in length. The head is prominent with eyes widely separated. The pronotum is very short, fringed with setae, posteriorly truncated, with the disc impressed and bearing a median longitudinal impressed line. The elytra are 2.5 mm long, scarcely extending beyond the middle of the abdomen; the apex is narrowed, subacuminate, and before the apex internally subsinuate. The elytra are opaque with veins irregularly arranged. The right elytron has the inner half expanded and translucent, provided with curved, subparallel veins. The wings are lanceolate and very short. The femora are unarmed. The tibiae are slightly spinose; the fore tibiae are half as long as the femora, bearing a spine near the apex. The tarsi are elongated and lack an arolium. The abdomen ends in a very large supra-anal plate, keeled or folded in the middle longitudinally and rounded posteriorly; the subgenital plate is also large, rounded and slightly sinuate on either side near the base. The cerci have the first segment pale and large. The general color is dark brown, with short greyish hairs and pale legs.

== Distribution and habitat ==
The species is known from the Republic of Congo, Côte d'Ivoire, Equatorial Guinea, the Democratic Republic of the Congo, and Angola.
