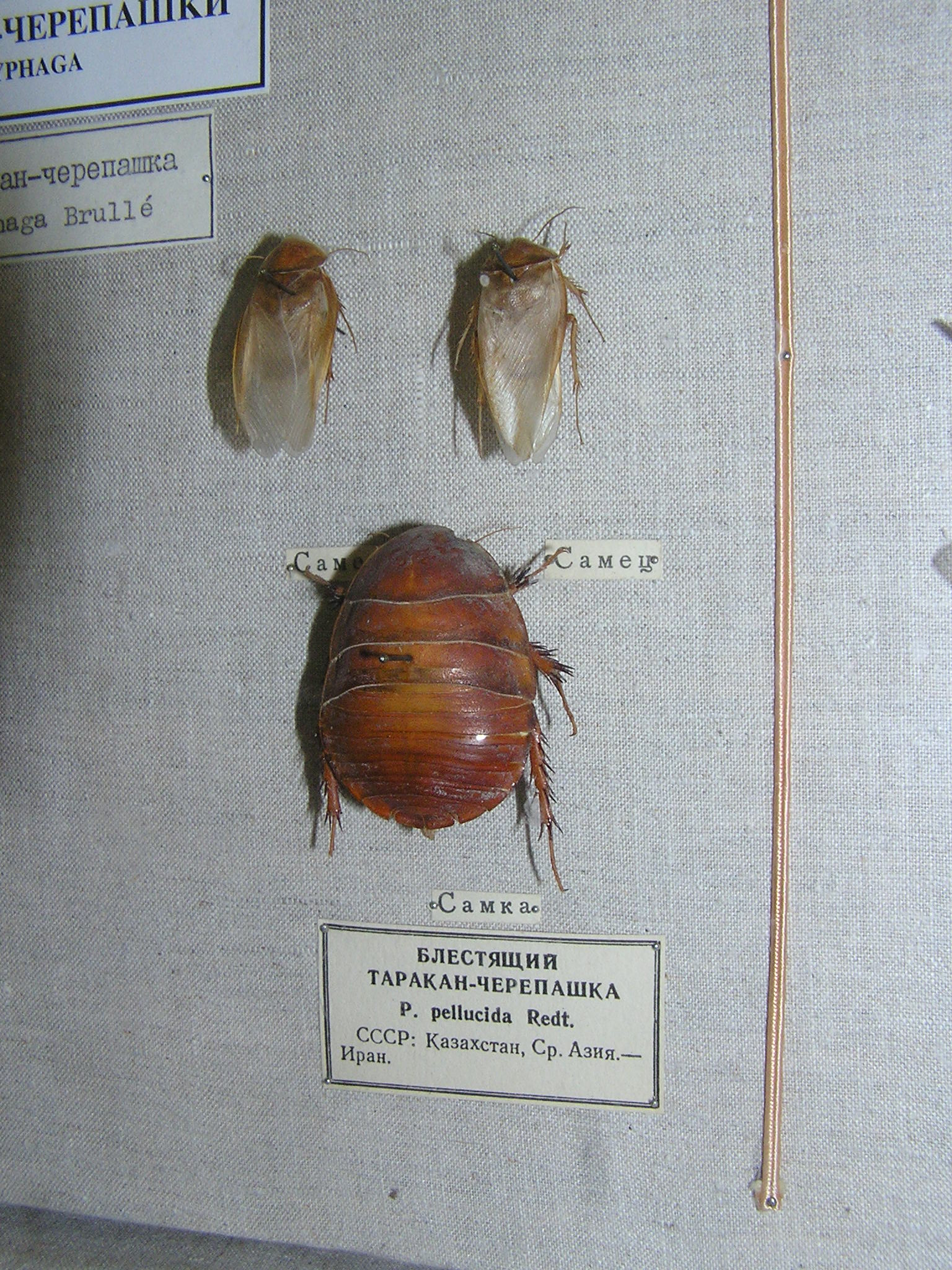
- Polyphaga pellucida in the Saint Petersburg Zoological Museum

Scientific classification
- Kingdom: Animalia
- Phylum: Arthropoda
- Clade: Pancrustacea
- Class: Insecta
- Order: Blattodea
- Family: Corydiidae
- Subfamily: Corydiinae; Saussure & Zehntner, 1893

Synonyms
- Polyphaginae Saussure, 1864

= Corydiinae =

Corydiinae Temporal range: Barremian–Present

Subfamily of cockroaches

Corydiinae is a subfamily of the order Blattodea (cockroaches). Many are known as sand cockroaches. The subfamily, comprising about 20 genera, contains half the genera in Corydiidae. One prominent species is the desert cockroach, Arenivaga investigata.

== Genera ==
The Cockroach Species File lists:

1. Anisogamia Saussure, 1893
2. Arenivaga Rehn, 1903
3. Austropolyphaga Mackerras, 1968
4. Eremoblatta Rehn, 1903
5. Ergaula Walker, 1868
6. Eucorydia Hebard, 1929
7. Eupolyphaga Chopard, 1929
8. Hemelytroblatta Chopard, 1929
9. Heterogamisca Bey-Bienko, 1950
10. Heterogamodes Chopard, 1929
11. Homoeogamia Burmeister, 1838
12. Hypercompsa Saussure, 1864
13. Leiopteroblatta Chopard, 1969
14. Mononychoblatta Chopard, 1929
15. Nymphrytria Shelford, 1911
16. Polyphaga Brullé, 1835
17. Polyphagina Chopard, 1929
18. Polyphagoides Mackerras, 1968
19. Therea Billberg, 1820
