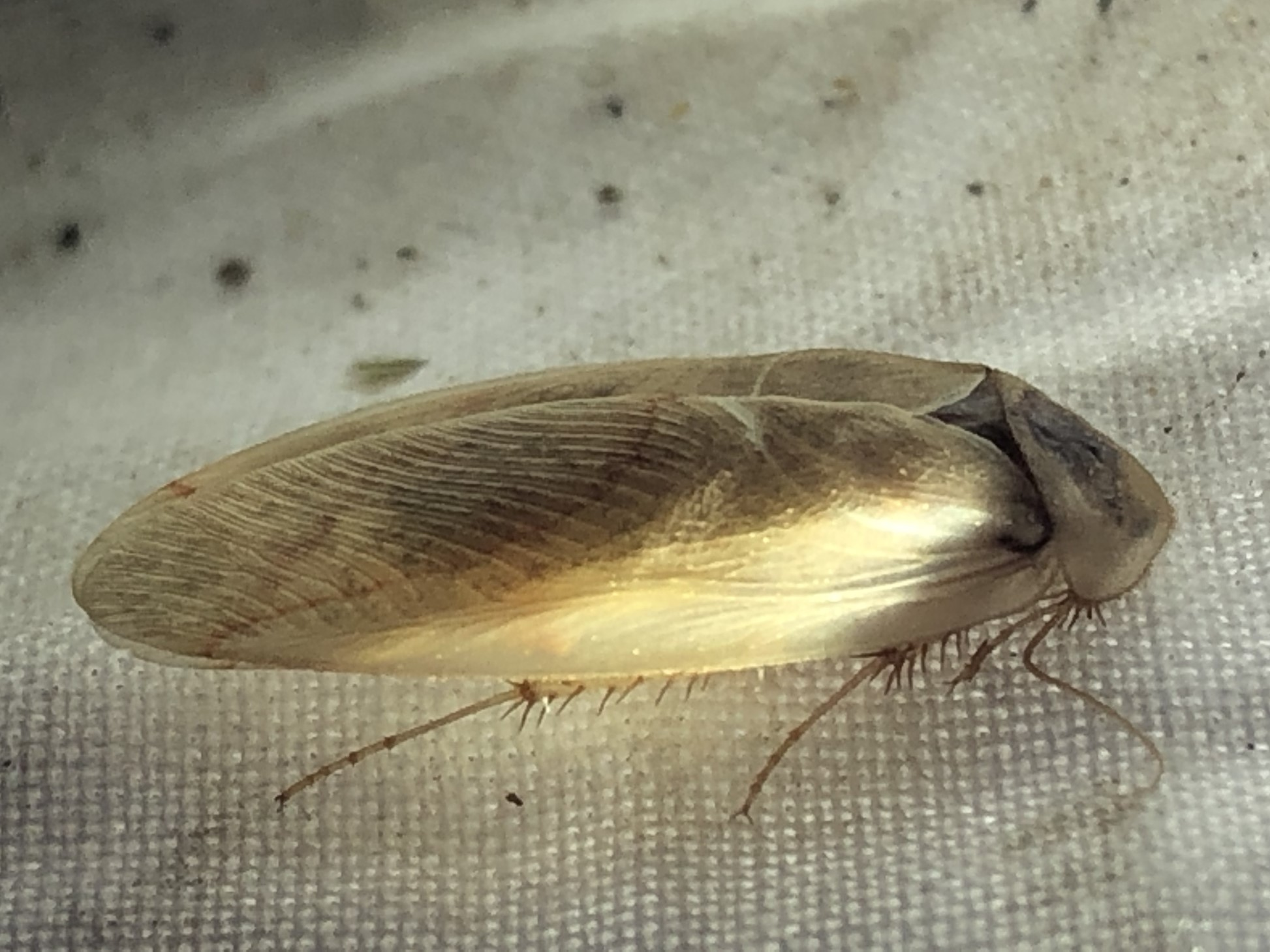

Scientific classification
- Kingdom: Animalia
- Phylum: Arthropoda
- Clade: Pancrustacea
- Class: Insecta
- Order: Blattodea
- Family: Corydiidae
- Genus: Arenivaga
- Species: A. erratica

Binomial name
- Arenivaga erratica (Rehn, 1903)

= Arenivaga erratica =

Species of cockroach

Arenivaga erratica, commonly known as the erratic sand cockroach, is a species of cockroach in the family Corydiidae. It is found in Central America and North America.
