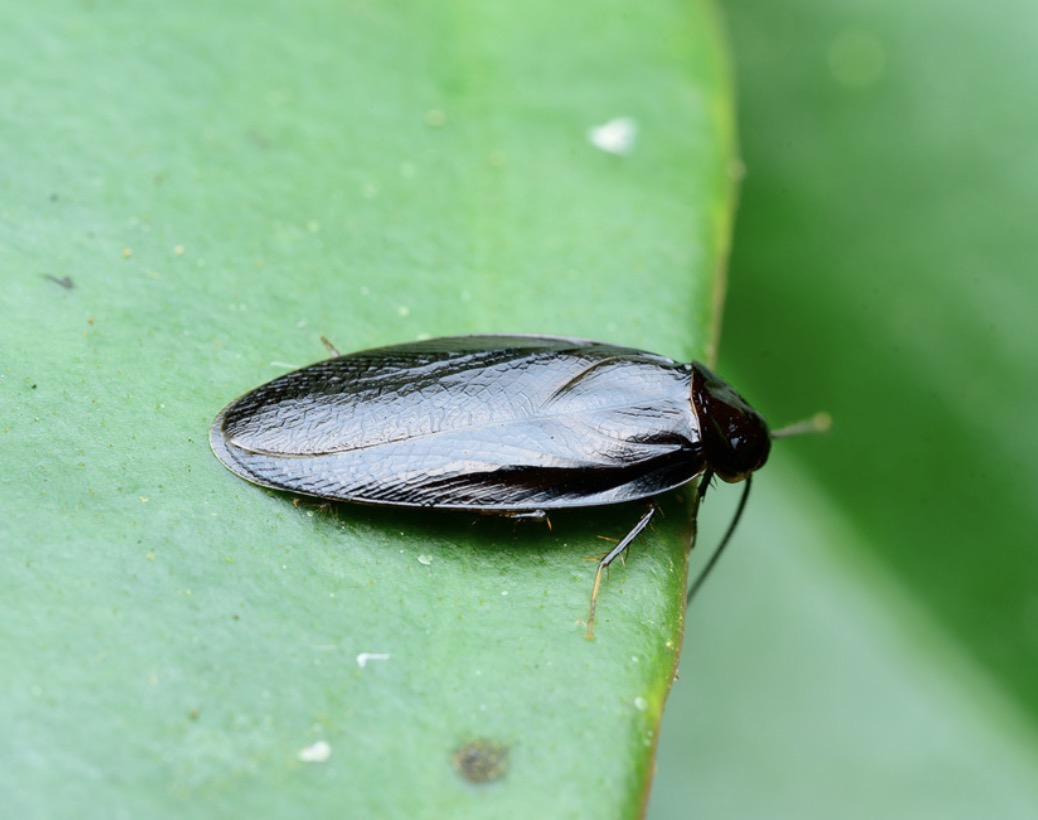
- Ctenoneura sp.

Scientific classification
- Kingdom: Animalia
- Phylum: Arthropoda
- Class: Insecta
- Order: Blattodea
- Family: Corydiidae
- Genus: Ctenoneura; Hanitsch, 1925

Type species
- Ctenoneura major Hanitsch, 1925

Species
- See text

= Ctenoneura =

Genus of cockroaches

Ctenoneura is a genus of small cockroaches in the family Corydiidae found in Southeast Asia.

== Species ==
The following 39 species are included in the genus Ctenoneura:

- Ctenoneura annulicornis Princis, 1954 – Myanmar
- Ctenoneura bawangensis Qiu, Che & Wang, 2017 – China (Yunnan)
- Ctenoneura biguttata Hanitsch, 1932 – Malaysia
- Ctenoneura birmanica Princis, 1954 – Myanmar
- Ctenoneura brunnea Hanitsch, 1929 – Malaysia
- Ctenoneura complicata Anisyutkin, 2021 – Vietnam
- Ctenoneura crassistyla Roth, 1993 – Malaysia (Sabah)
- Ctenoneura delicata Qiu, Che & Wang, 2017 – China (Yunnan)
- Ctenoneura elongata Qiu, Che & Wang, 2017 – China (Yunnan)
- Ctenoneura emarginata Anisyutkin, 2021 – Vietnam
- Ctenoneura fulva Hanitsch, 1925 – Malaysia
- Ctenoneura gigantea Roth, 1993 – Malaysia (Sabah)
- Ctenoneura gorochovi Anisyutkin, 2021 – Vietnam
- Ctenoneura hanitschi Princis, 1954 – Myanmar
- Ctenoneura heixuanfeng Qiu, Che & Wang, 2017 – China (Yunnan)
- Ctenoneura helicata Qiu, Che & Wang, 2017 – China (Yunnan)
- Ctenoneura kemneri Princis, 1967 – Indonesia (Sumatra)
- Ctenoneura kinabaluana Roth, 1993 – Malaysia (Sabah)
- Ctenoneura luma Roth, 1993 – Malaysia (Sarawak)
- Ctenoneura major Hanitsch, 1925 – Malaysia
- Ctenoneura misera Bey-Bienko, 1969 – Vietnam
- Ctenoneura mjoebergi Princis, 1954 – Indonesia (Java)
- Ctenoneura murudensis Roth, 1993 – Malaysia (Sarawak)
- Ctenoneura orlovi Anisyutkin, 2021 – Vietnam
- Ctenoneura papillaris Qiu, Che & Wang, 2017 – China (Yunnan)
- Ctenoneura parascutica Roth, 1993 – Malaysia (Sabah)
- Ctenoneura poringa Roth, 1993 – Malaysia (Sabah)
- Ctenoneura propannulicornis Roth, 1993 – Malaysia (Sabah)
- Ctenoneura qiuae Qiu, Che & Wang, 2017 – China (Yunnan)
- Ctenoneura scutica Roth, 1993 – Malaysia (Sabah)
- Ctenoneura simulans Bey-Bienko, 1969 – Vietnam
- Ctenoneura sipitanga Roth, 1995 – Malaysia (Sabah)
- Ctenoneura spinastyla Roth, 1993 – Malaysia (Sabah)
- Ctenoneura triprocessa Roth, 1993 – Malaysia (Sabah)
- Ctenoneura tuberculata Princis, 1954 – Myanmar
- Ctenoneura uncata Roth, 1993 – Malaysia (Sabah)
- Ctenoneura virgata Anisyutkin, 2021 – Vietnam
- Ctenoneura yunnanea Bey-Bienko, 1957 – China (Yunnan)

== Taxonomy and systematics ==
The genus Ctenoneura was described by Hanitsch in 1925. It comprises small, morphologically specialized cockroaches that are taxonomically isolated within Corydiidae. Although superficially similar to small members of Ectobiidae, placement in Corydiidae is supported by the folded anal area of the hind wing. The male genitalia are strongly reduced and highly modified, making homologization of structures difficult. Only the homology of the R3 sclerite is considered undisputed. The subfamily placement of the genus remains unresolved, and it is treated as Corydiidae incertae sedis. Clarification of its phylogenetic position is considered to require further comparative and molecular study.

== Description ==
Members of the genus are small cockroaches with body length (without wings) ranging from 5.0 to 9.7 mm. The body is narrow, smooth, shining and not pubescent, with coloration varying from brownish yellow to dark brown. The head may be partly hidden, with a rounded vertex, eyes widely separated, very small or nearly degenerate ocelli, and large, round antennal sockets. The pronotum is generally subcircular or oval. Tegmina and wings are fully developed in males, with major veins often densely reticulate and bearing numerous cross veins. Tegmina are horny, with oblique Sc and R branches, a well-developed M vein usually with three to six branches, a simplified CuA, and an intercalary vein between R and M that may be incomplete. Hind wings show a folded anal area in the resting position, with CuA usually having three to eight parallel branches connected by numerous cross veins. Legs have a front femur of Type C, sometimes bearing small basal processes and surface setae; pulvilli are absent, tarsal claws are symmetrical and simple, and arolia are small or absent. The abdomen has unspecialized terga. The supra-anal plate is transverse and variable in shape. Cerci are long and pubescent, sometimes with specialized basal segments. The subgenital plate is asymmetrical and species-specific, usually with one stylus or none, and in some species bears a slender curved subgenital sclerite with an associated extending structure. Male genitalia consist of a strongly reduced left phallomere, a highly specialized right phallomere, and a long transverse sclerite. Females, where known, are apterous, with reduced eyes, robust cerci with an apical spine, and a valvular subgenital plate. The ootheca is oval, with small serrations on the keel and a ribbed surface.

== Distribution and habitat ==
Species of Ctenoneura are distributed in the Oriental Region, occurring from Myanmar and southern China through the Malay Peninsula to Sumatra, Java and Borneo. Records indicate presence in Myanmar, China (Yunnan and Hainan), Vietnam, Malaysia and Indonesia. Specimens are often collected from forest habitats, such as from rotten wood, at elevations ranging from approximately 650 m to 2000 m.

== Biology ==
Members of the genus are considered to be wood-feeding cockroaches. Due to their small size and fragile body structure, they are rarely collected and are poorly represented in scientific collections. Females are reported to be apterous (wingless), while males are fully winged.
