= Therea =

Therea may refer to:

- Therea (insect), a genus of cockroaches including the seven-spotted cockroach
- Therea (comics), a mystic extra-dimensional realm from the Marvel Universe
