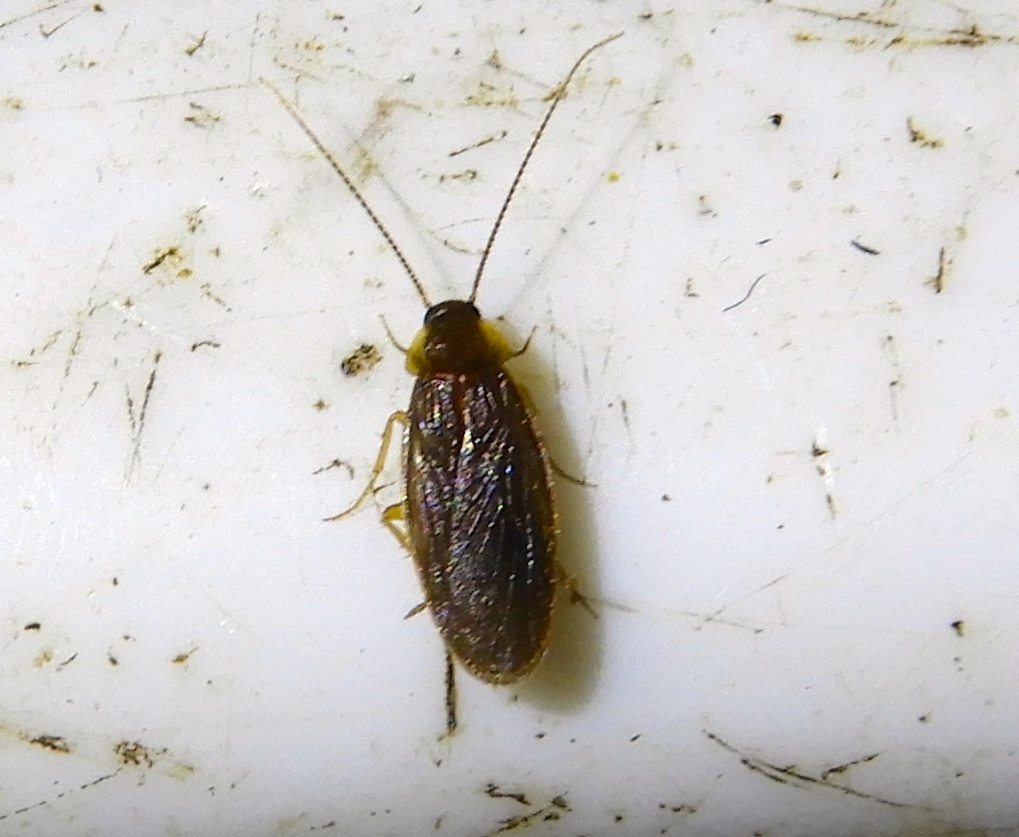

Scientific classification
- Kingdom: Animalia
- Phylum: Arthropoda
- Clade: Pancrustacea
- Class: Insecta
- Order: Blattodea
- Family: Corydiidae
- Genus: Compsodes
- Species: C. schwarzi

Binomial name
- Compsodes schwarzi (Caudell, 1903)

= Compsodes schwarzi =

Species of cockroach

Compsodes schwarzi, or Schwarz's hooded cockroach, is a species of cockroach in the family Corydiidae. It is found in Central America, North America.
