= Arenivaga genitalis =

Scientific classification
- Kingdom: Animalia
- Phylum: Arthropoda
- Clade: Pancrustacea
- Class: Insecta
- Order: Blattodea
- Family: Corydiidae
- Genus: Arenivaga
- Species: A. genitalis

Binomial name
- Arenivaga genitalis Caudell, 1918

Species of cockroach

Arenivaga genitalis, the Arizona sand cockroach, is a species of cockroach in the family Corydiidae. It is found in North America.
