= Arenivaga tonkawa =

Scientific classification
- Kingdom: Animalia
- Phylum: Arthropoda
- Clade: Pancrustacea
- Class: Insecta
- Order: Blattodea
- Family: Corydiidae
- Genus: Arenivaga
- Species: A. tonkawa

Binomial name
- Arenivaga tonkawa Hebard, 1920

Species of cockroach

Arenivaga tonkawa, the tonkawa sand cockroach, is a species of cockroach in the family Corydiidae. It is found in Central America and North America.
