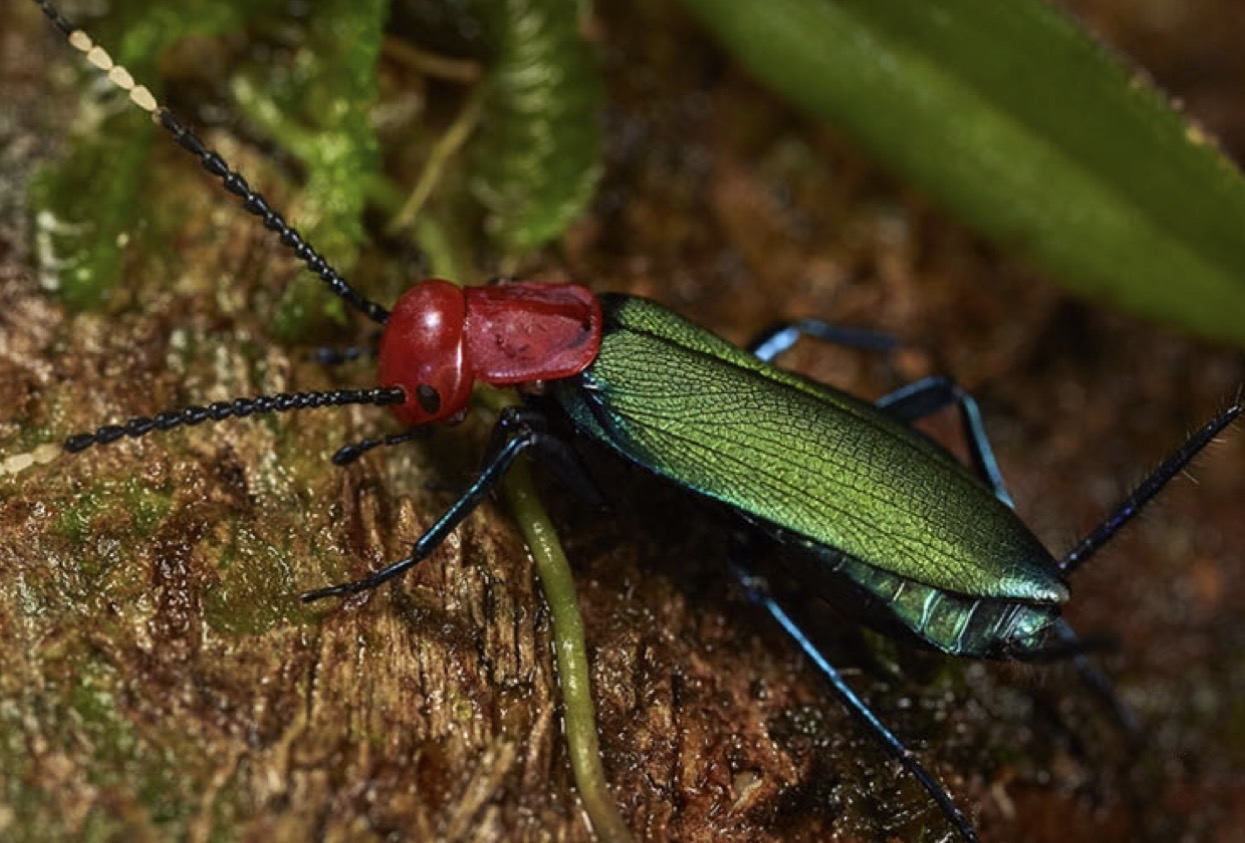
- Melyroidea magnifica in Sumaco Napo-Galeras National Park, Ecuador

Scientific classification
- Kingdom: Animalia
- Phylum: Arthropoda
- Class: Insecta
- Order: Blattodea
- Family: Corydiidae
- Genus: Melyroidea
- Species: M. magnifica

Binomial name
- Melyroidea magnifica Shelford, 1912

= Melyroidea magnifica =

Species of cockroach

Melyroidea magnifica is a species of cockroach described by British entomologist Robert Walter Campbell Shelford in 1912.
