= Ipolatta =

Scientific classification
- Kingdom: Animalia
- Phylum: Arthropoda
- Clade: Pancrustacea
- Class: Insecta
- Order: Blattodea
- Family: Corydiidae
- Subfamily: Latindiinae
- Genus: Ipolatta; Karny, 1914
- Species: I. paradoxa

Binomial name
- Ipolatta paradoxa Karny, 1914

Species of cockroach

Ipolatta paradoxa is a species of cockroach in the subfamily Latindiinae of the family Corydiidae. It is the only species in the monotypic genus Ipolatta, and has been recorded from Myanmar and India (Assam).

== Taxonomy and systematics ==
The species was described by Karny in 1914. It is characterized by a strongly transverse head (with a truncated vertex), a discoid and large pronotum (with a truncated hind margin), horny and veinless tegmina that exceed the abdomen, and shortened wings. The supra-anal plate is transverse, and the female subgenital plate is deeply split. The head shape resembles that of related genera such as Latindia, Sinolatindia, and Gapudipentax. This species is so far known only from the original description, and its identity requires further confirmation.
