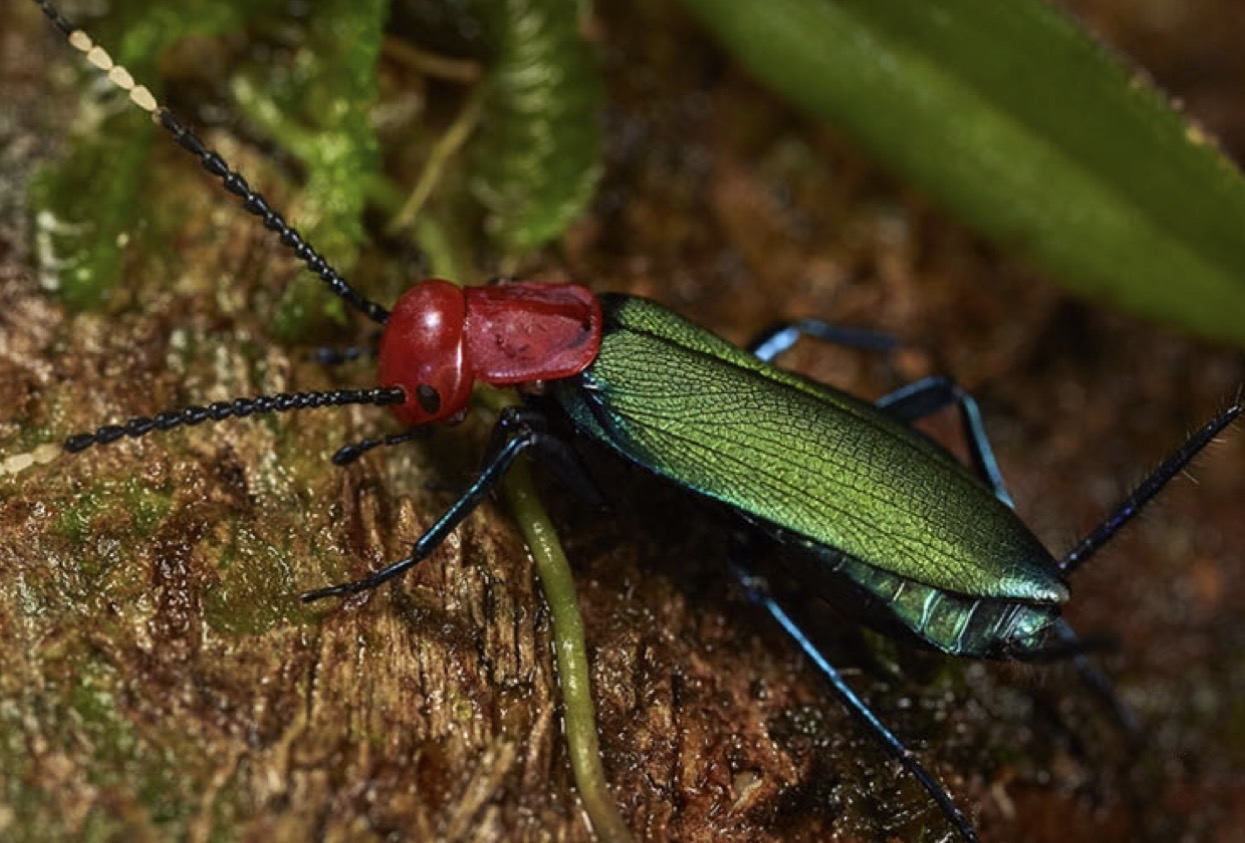
- Melyroidea magnifica in Sumaco Napo-Galeras National Park, Ecuador

Scientific classification
- Kingdom: Animalia
- Phylum: Arthropoda
- Class: Insecta
- Order: Blattodea
- Family: Corydiidae
- Genus: Melyroidea; Shelford, 1912

Type species
- Melyroidea magnifica Shelford, 1912

= Melyroidea =

Genus of cockroaches

Melyroidea is a genus of cockroaches in the family Corydiidae found in tropical South America.

== Species ==
Three species are recognised:

- Melyroidea ecuadoriana Vidlička & Vršanský, 2020 – Ecuador
- Melyroidea magnifica Shelford, 1912 – Ecuador and Peru
- Melyroidea mimetica Shelford, 1912 – Brazil

== Taxonomy and systematics ==
The genus Melyroidea was described by Shelford in 1912. The phylogenetic position of Melyroidea was unclear and he originally classified it in the subfamily Blattinae. Gurney in 1948 designated M. magnifica as the type species of the genus. Melyroidea is currently classified within Corydiidae, with recent classification also indicating relations within Ectobiidae, though molecular analysis has not been conducted yet.

== Description ==
The genus is characterized by a semiglobose head with small eyes far apart on the sides. The antennae have moniliform joints. The pronotum is quadrate with rounded angles and margins somewhat reflexed. The tegmina are densely reticulated, obscuring the venation, and are semi-corneous in texture. The wings have a moderate apical field which in repose is doubled on itself longitudinally and tightly rolled up. The supra-anal lamina of the female is triangular or trigonal; the sub-genital lamina is divided by a sulcus. The legs are slender, with all femora unarmed, tibiae very sparsely spined, and tarsi without arolia. The two original species present a curious resemblance to Malacoderm Coleoptera in their form and coloration. The head with its globose front and widely separated small eyes, the cleft subgenital lamina of the female, and the naked tarsal claws are characteristic. The wing-structure is totally unlike that of the Corydiinae, with a prominent apical area and posterior part furnished with radiating veins, typically Plectopterine in structure.

== Biology and ecology ==
Observations from 2017–2019 provide evidence of eusocial behaviour in this genus residing in cloud forests on the Eastern slopes of the Andes. A colony of M. magnifica was observed occupying cavities inside a Casearia tree. Colony structure was complex, with observations revealing at least four different instars and colour variability much higher than any other known cockroach. The colony contained different nymphal stages, including a larger metallic green–coloured stage and a smaller pale brown–coloured stage. Activity of early nymphs was nearly entirely restricted to within the nests. Adults and older stages were frequently observed outside the nest, exhibiting clumping/agglomerating behaviour. Specimens were observed as strict herbivores (algaevores), feeding on algal film. Communal feeding with specimens tightly clustered was observed. No predation or detritus feeding was observed. Guards were observed at the nest entrance. An ant trying to enter the nest was denied. Escape behaviour was characterised by higher activity. Comfort behaviour was observed in the form of cleaning the antenna. Nest repair behaviour was documented. The cockroaches do not leave the nest every day and might emerge en masse to feed during good conditions.

== Distribution ==
The genus is found in the Neotropics, specifically in Ecuador, Peru, and Brazil.
