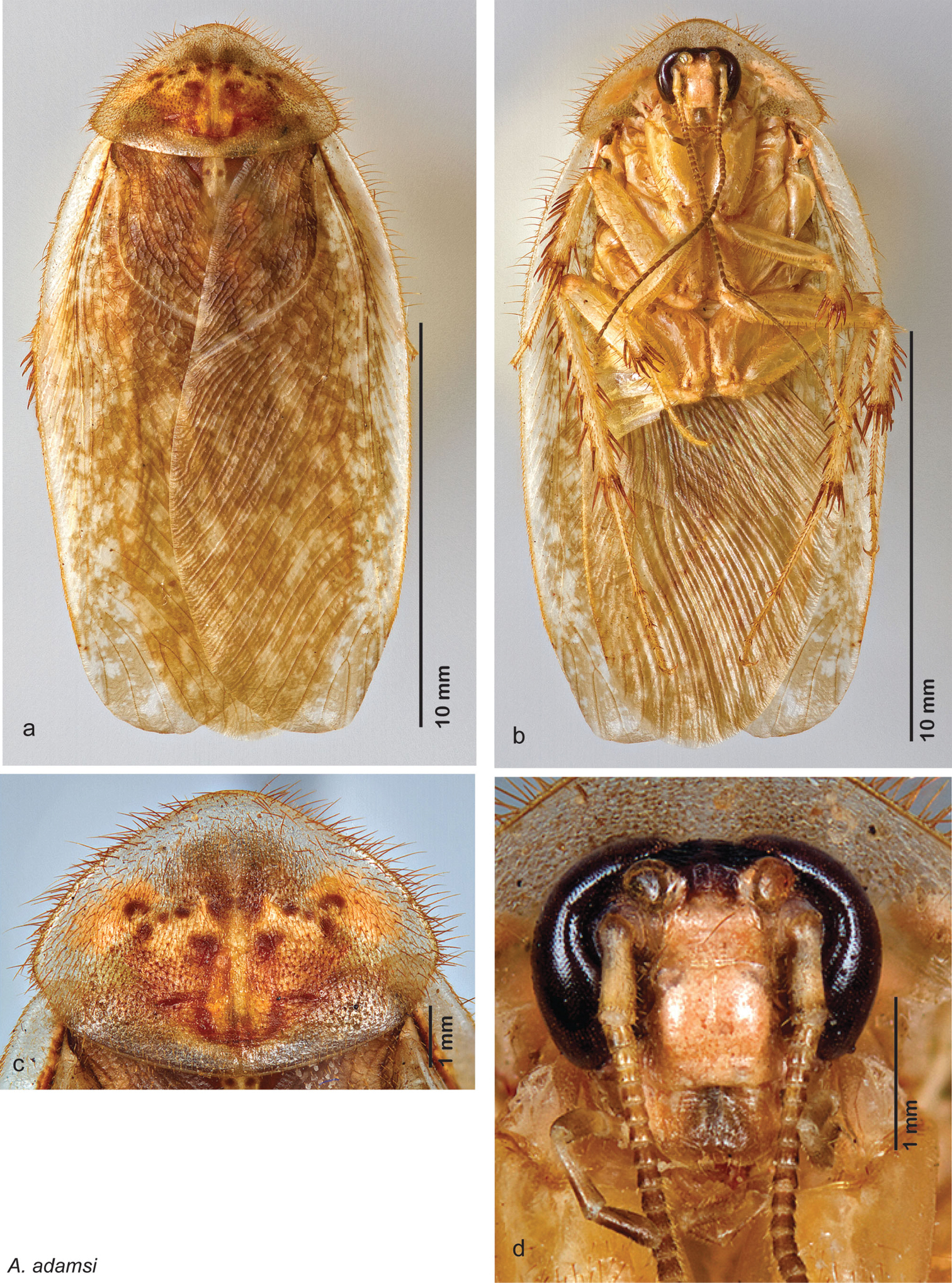

Scientific classification
- Kingdom: Animalia
- Phylum: Arthropoda
- Clade: Pancrustacea
- Class: Insecta
- Order: Blattodea
- Family: Corydiidae
- Genus: Arenivaga
- Species: A. adamsi

Binomial name
- Arenivaga adamsi Hopkins, 2014
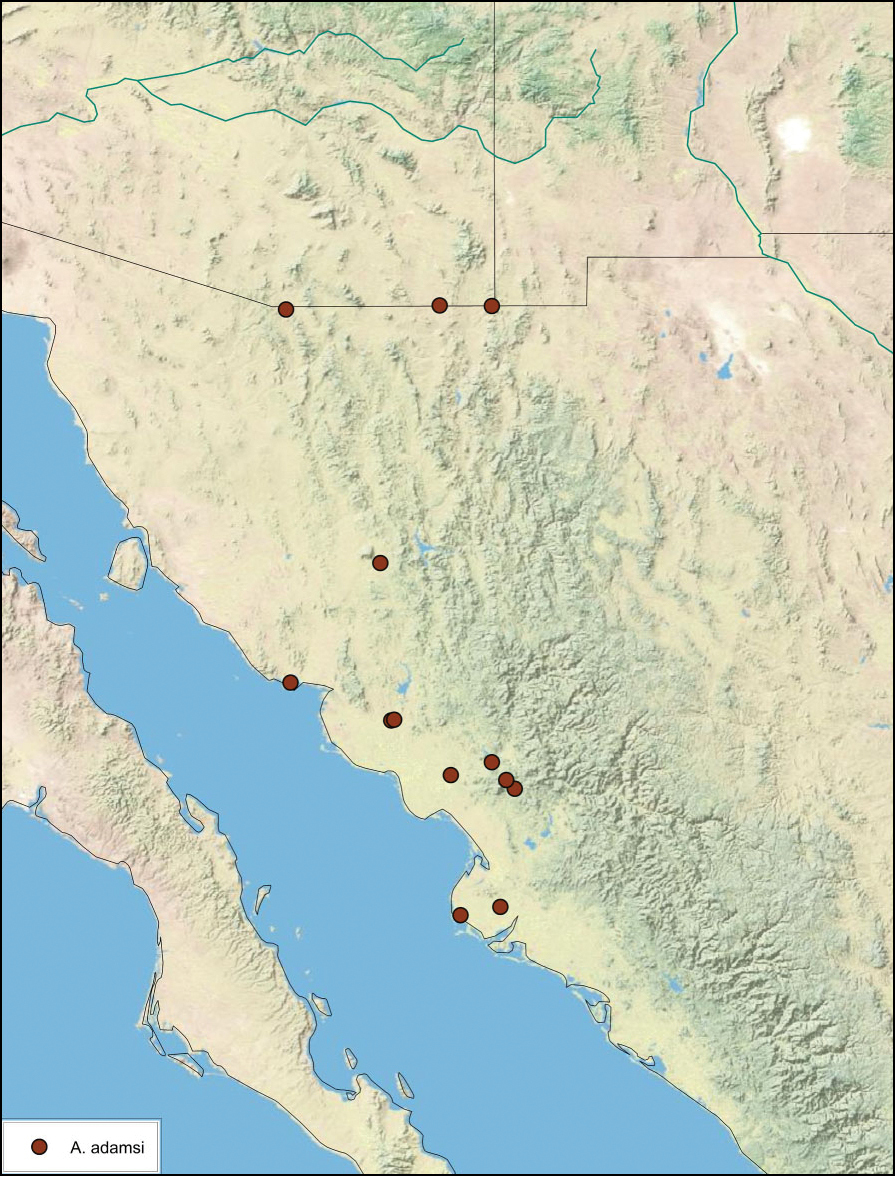
- Range

= Arenivaga adamsi =

Species of cockroach

Arenivaga adamsi is a species of cockroach in the family Corydiidae. The body is orange-brown, and 15.8–20.7 millimetres (0.62–0.81 in) long. The species is native to Mexico and the United States.

Arenivaga adamsi was described in 2014, and is named after the author Douglas Adams.

== Taxonomy ==
The species was described by Heidi Hopkins in 2014. The holotype is a male. The type locality is near Arroyo Cuchujaqui, in Sonora, Mexico.

== Distribution ==
Arenivaga adamsi is found in Mexico (central Sonora and northern Sinaloa), and southeastern Arizona, United States.

== Description ==
The body is 15.8–20.7 millimetres (0.62–0.81 in) long, and 7.3–10.3 millimetres (0.29–0.41 in) wide at its widest point. The pronotum is translucent, waxy, and beige in colour. The pronotum has orange-brown or red-brown spots, and short, orange brown hairs on its dorsal surface. The legs and body are orange-brown. Some specimens have brown spots on each sternite.

The wings are medium to dark brown, matte, and opaque.

The ocelli are large, ovoid, and protruding. The vertex is dark brown, with small ridges. The front of the head is a translucent peach-brown colour. The lower portion of the clypeus is translucent, peach brown, and smooth.

Arenivaga adamsi is similar to Arenivaga moctezuma. The species can be distinguished by a spine on the right dorsal phallomere.

== Etymology ==
The name is a noun in the genitive case, and honours the author Douglas Adams, who "loved and respected all life on this planet".
