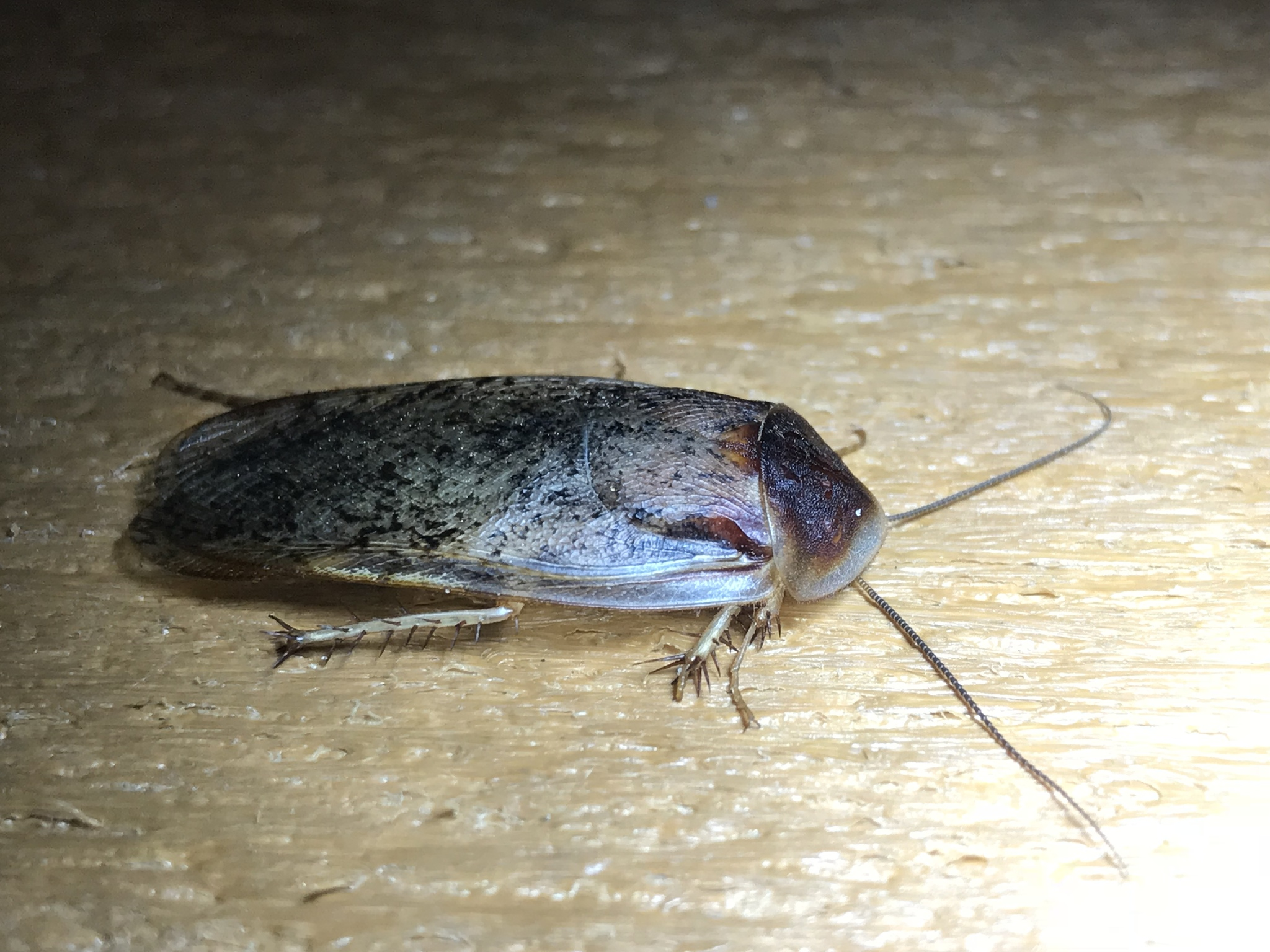

Scientific classification
- Kingdom: Animalia
- Phylum: Arthropoda
- Clade: Pancrustacea
- Class: Insecta
- Order: Blattodea
- Family: Corydiidae
- Genus: Arenivaga
- Species: A. bolliana

Binomial name
- Arenivaga bolliana (Saussure, 1893)

= Arenivaga bolliana =

Species of cockroach

Arenivaga bolliana, known generally as the Boll's sand cockroach or Boll's sandroach, is a species of cockroach in the family Corydiidae. It is found in North America.
