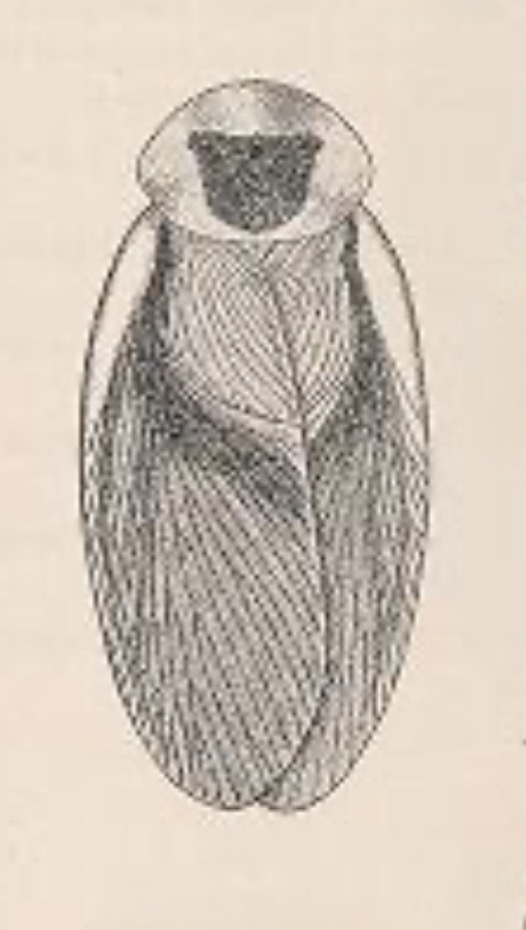
- Pholadoblatta inusitata drawing

Scientific classification
- Kingdom: Animalia
- Phylum: Arthropoda
- Class: Insecta
- Order: Blattodea
- Family: Corydiidae
- Genus: Pholadoblatta; Rehn & Hebard, 1927
- Species: P. inusitata

Binomial name
- Pholadoblatta inusitata (Rehn, 1906)

Synonyms
- Aphlebia inusitata Rehn, 1906

= Pholadoblatta =

Genus of cockroaches

Pholadoblatta inusitata is a species of cockroach in the family Corydiidae. It is the only species in the monotypic genus Pholadoblatta, and is found in Cuba and the Bahamas.

== Description ==
Length of the body is 4.6–4.87 mm, length of pronotum is 1.42–1.5 mm, and length of tegmen is 2–2.18 mm. The species is very small and considerably depressed in form.

The head is hidden under the pronotum, with a very broad vertex, moderately hirsute antennae, and an interspace between the eyes at the occiput nearly twice the width of the interspace between the antennal scrobes. The occipital outline is broadly but regularly arcuate.

The pronotum is rounded, with greatest length contained one and one-third times in its greatest width. It is moderately cucullate over the head, which is completely covered when seen from the dorsum. The lateral sections are appreciably declivent, and all margins are narrowly cingulate.

The tegmina are corneous, relatively broad, and subquadrate. Their greatest width is contained one and three-fifths times in their greatest length. They are slightly longer than the pronotum, reaching just beyond the middle of the abdomen to the base of the antepenultimate tergite, and overlapping for about two-thirds their length. The costal margin is slightly arcuate, the sutural margin nearly straight, and the distal margin obliquely truncate to almost evenly arcuate; there are no veins, and the costal margin is considerably reflexed and apparently recurved dorsad in a broad, shallow, gutter-like concavity. The wings are not functional.

The abdomen tapers. The supra-anal plate is very short, broad, and almost hidden under the preceding tergite. The cerci are broad fusiform, depressed, and nearly twice the length of the penultimate tergite. The subgenital plate is asymmetrical, obliquely fissate disto-mesad, with a marked and fully developed style inserted at the dextral base.

The femora have both ventral margins armed with fine, closely placed spines. The general color is raw sienna. The head is washed with dark brown, and the eyes are blackish. The pronotum has the supra-cephalic section dark. The abdomen has the segments dark proximad. The limbs are pale ochraceous.

== Ecology ==
The type specimen was collected from Andros Island, Bahamas, in May–June 1904, from the galleries of a large nest of the jumping ant Odontomachus insularis, suggesting it is likely a myrmecophile. A specimen was also recorded from Camoa, Havana Province, Cuba. This genus and species is the only blattid known or presumed to be a myrmecophile from the West Indies.
