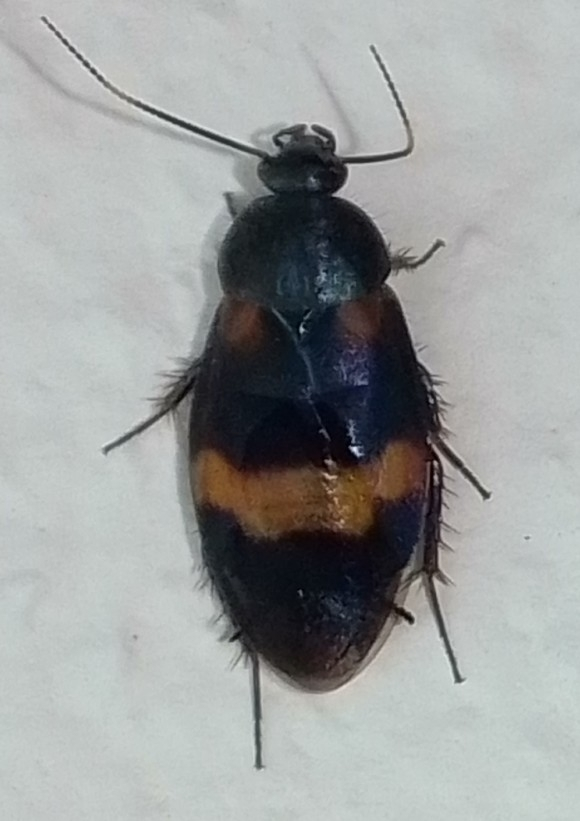
- Holocompsa azteca

Scientific classification
- Kingdom: Animalia
- Phylum: Arthropoda
- Clade: Pancrustacea
- Class: Insecta
- Order: Blattodea
- Family: Corydiidae
- Genus: Holocompsa; Burmeister, 1838

= Holocompsa =

Genus of cockroaches

Holocompsa is a genus of hairy sand cockroaches in the family Corydiidae. It is the only genus in the subfamily Holocompsinae.

== Distribution ==
Eight of 11 species of the genus Holocompsa are found in the Americas; two species are found in Asia, H. debilis and H. zhangi; and one species is found in Africa, H. pusilla.

== Species ==
The following species have been described:

- Holocompsa azteca (Saussure, 1862)
- Holocompsa binotata (Saussure & Zehntner, 1894)
- Holocompsa cyanea (Burmeister, 1838)
- Holocompsa debilis (Walker, 1868)
- Holocompsa nitidula (Fabricius, 1781)
- Holocompsa panamae (Hebard, 1920)
- Holocompsa pusilla (Bolívar, 1924)
- †Holocompsa scleroptera (Vršanský et al., 2025)
- Holocompsa scotaea (Hebard, 1922)
- Holocompsa tolteca (Saussure & Zehntner, 1894)
- Holocompsa zapoteca (Saussure & Zehntner, 1894)
- Holocompsa zhangi (Qiu, Wang, & Che, 2020)
