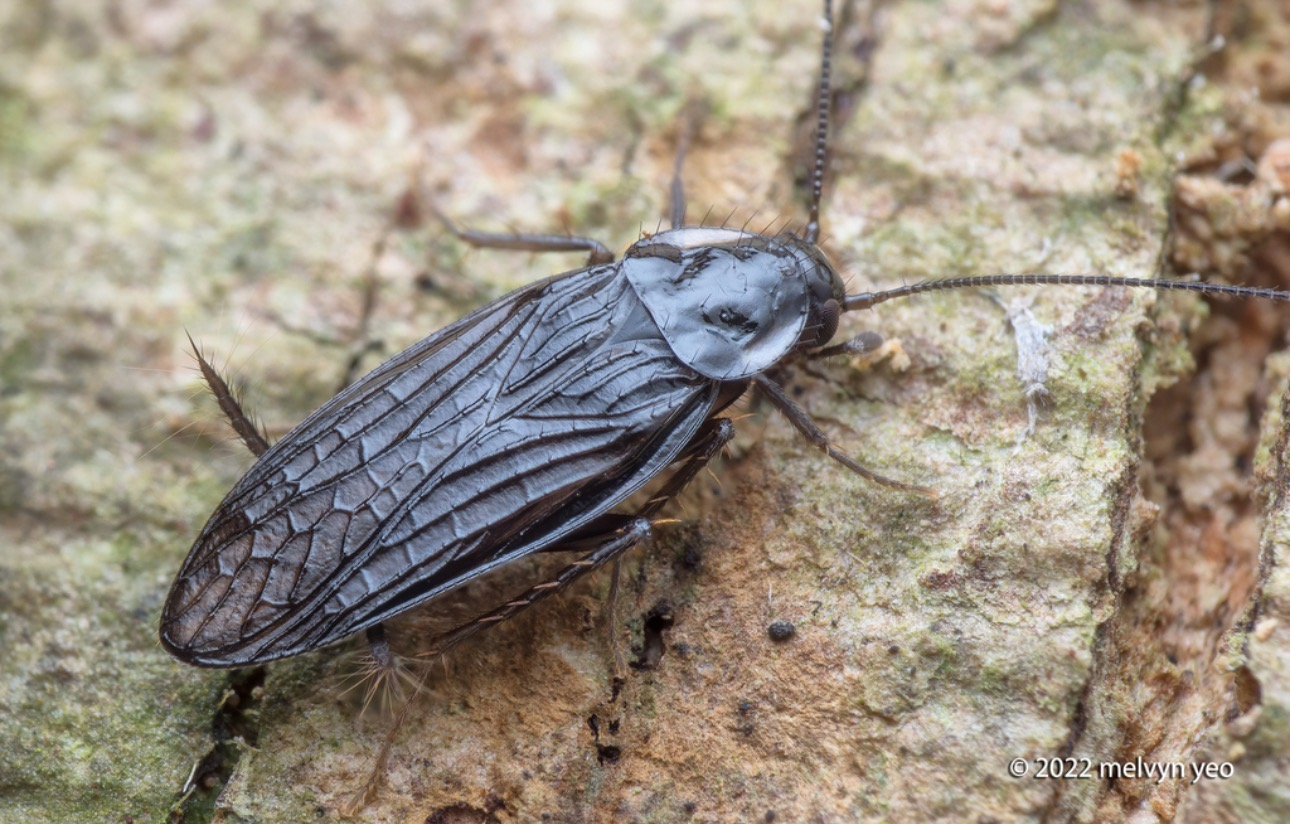
- Homopteroidea sp.

Scientific classification
- Kingdom: Animalia
- Phylum: Arthropoda
- Class: Insecta
- Order: Blattodea
- Family: Corydiidae
- Genus: Homopteroidea; Shelford, 1906

Type species
- Homopteroidea nigra Shelford, 1906

Synonyms
- Fulmekia Karny, 1926

= Homopteroidea =

Genus of cockroaches

Homopteroidea is a genus of cockroaches in the family Polyphagidae found in Malesia.

== Description ==
The genus is diagnosed by eyes that are reduced, wide apart, lateral, and located behind the antennal sockets. Tegmina and wings are usually fully developed and extend beyond the end of the abdomen, or the tegmina are reduced and hind wings vestigial in one species. In fully developed winged forms, the venation and pigmentation of the right and left tegmina usually differ, with the major veins thickened or raised; the region of the presutural vein branches of the right tegmen is colorless and hyaline (except in H. aberrans). The hind wing lacks an intercalary vein between the radius and media; the cubitus vein has two or three branches whose distal regions are usually connected by cross veins (except in H. aberrans). The front femur is Type C_{3}, with piliform spinules that are practically contiguous and appear as a dense fringe. Pulvilli are absent. Tarsal claws are symmetrical and distinctly toothed on their proximal halves. Arolia are usually absent, or if present are small and fleshy-whitish. In the male, the abdomen is unspecialized; the supraanal plate usually has a large white or yellowish medial nonsetose macula (absent in male H. aberrans and all females). The subgenital plate is symmetrical with a pair of similar, widely spaced styli; its anterior margin is often straight and usually lacks lateral apodemes. The female subgenital plate is incised longitudinally. A mating pair of H. nodipennis was observed with the distal half of the male's supraanal plate bent anteriorly to hold the female's terminalia in his genital chamber.

== Species ==
- Homopteroidea aberrans (Hanitsch, 1928) - Sumatra and Borneo
- Homopteroidea biramiata Roth, 1995 - Sumatra
- Homopteroidea brachyptera Roth, 1995 - Sumatra
- Homopteroidea maculata Hanitsch, 1929 - Philippines, Borneo and Sumatra
- Homopteroidea minor Hanitsch, 1933 - Borneo and Sumatra
- Homopteroidea nigra Shelford, 1906 - Indonesia (Java, Sulawesi, Sumatra and Borneo) and Malaysia (Borneo)
- Homopteroidea nodipennis (Karny, 1926) - Malaysia (mainland and Borneo) and Sumatra
- Homopteroidea shelfordi Hanitsch, 1925 - Borneo and Sumatra

== Distribution ==
The genus is found across Malesia. Species have been recorded from Borneo, Malaysia, the Philippines, and Indonesia (Java, Sulawesi, Sumatra).
