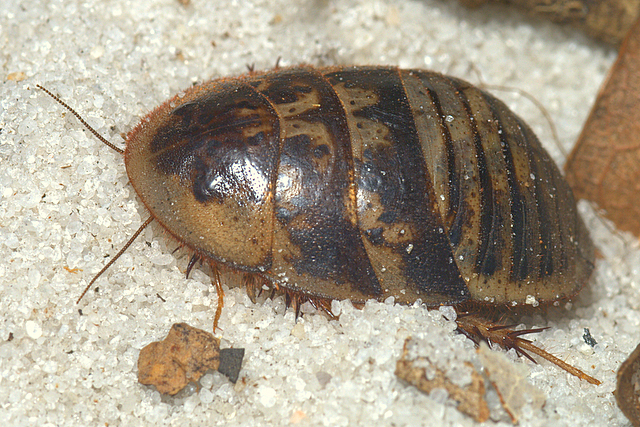
- Female Arenivaga floridensis

Scientific classification
- Kingdom: Animalia
- Phylum: Arthropoda
- Clade: Pancrustacea
- Class: Insecta
- Order: Blattodea
- Family: Corydiidae
- Genus: Arenivaga; Rehn, 1903

= Arenivaga =

Genus of cockroaches

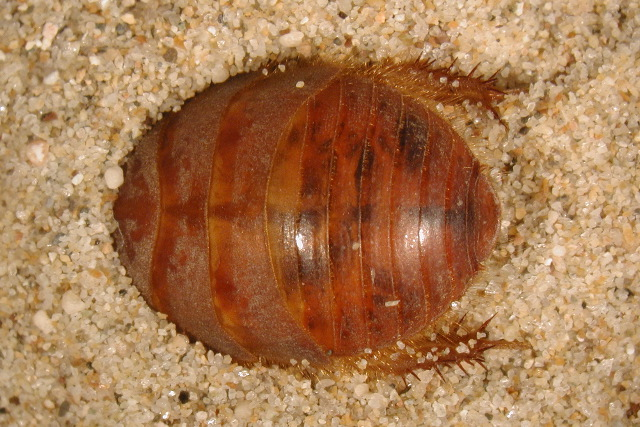
Sand roach burrowing

Arenivaga is a genus of sand cockroaches, of the subfamily Corydiinae, in the family Corydiidae. These cockroaches live in sandy soils and dunes in the southwestern United States, Florida and Mexico. Arenivaga comes from the Latin arena meaning sand and vagus meaning wandering.

== Species ==
As of August 2026, the Integrated Taxonomic Information System accepts the following species:

- Arenivaga adamsi
- Arenivaga akanthikos
- Arenivaga alichenas
- Arenivaga apacha
- Arenivaga apaeninsula
- Arenivaga aquila
- Arenivaga belli
- Arenivaga bolliana
- Arenivaga darwini
- Arenivaga delicata
- Arenivaga diaphana
- Arenivaga dnopheros
- Arenivaga erratica
- Arenivaga estelleae
- Arenivaga floridensis
- Arenivaga florilega
- Arenivaga gaiophanes
- Arenivaga galeana
- Arenivaga genitalis
- Arenivaga grandiscanyonensis
- Arenivaga grata
- Arenivaga gumperzae
- Arenivaga gurneyi
- Arenivaga haringtoni
- Arenivaga hebardi
- Arenivaga hopkinsorum
- Arenivaga hypogaios
- Arenivaga impensa
- Arenivaga investigata
- Arenivaga mckittrickae
- Arenivaga milleri
- Arenivaga moctezuma
- Arenivaga mortisvallisensis
- Arenivaga nalepae
- Arenivaga nicklei
- Arenivaga nocturna
- Arenivaga pagana
- Arenivaga paradoxa
- Arenivaga pratchetti
- Arenivaga pumila
- Arenivaga rehni
- Arenivaga ricei
- Arenivaga rothi
- Arenivaga sequoia
- Arenivaga tenax
- Arenivaga tonkawa
- Arenivaga trypheros
- Arenivaga umbratilis

== Characteristics ==
This genus is sexually dimorphic, with males and females differing in morphology. The insects are dorso-ventrally flattened and males have wings that are generally longer than the abdomen. The colour cannot be relied on to distinguish between species because the insects sequester pigments from their food and therefore their colour depends on their diet; they accumulate uric acid in varying amounts, and this also affects their appearance.

The head has a pair of long, slender antennae, two large compound eyes and two protuberant ocelli. The labrum is broad, and the frons and the hinder part of the clypeus are fused and form a bulge in a manner unusual for cockroaches. The pronotum is large and covers the head and extends sideways to about the width of the body. There are setae on the dorsal surface of the pronotum and different species have different patterning, which may be impressed into the surface. The patterning may be surrounded by an aura which radiates out from the pattern, and at the side of the pronotum, uric acid may be stored in white or pale pink patches.

The smallest species is A. pumila at a length of 14 mm (0.55 in), and the largest A. bolliana at 24 mm (0.94 in). Some species are broader and more robust than others. The legs bear many spines, including spines around the joint between the meso and meta-tibia, and the tarsi have two claws, except in A. darwini where there is only one. The main means of distinguishing between the different species is close examination of the male genitalia.

== Ecology ==
Females and nymphs live underground, "swimming" through the sandy substrate and residing in the burrows of small mammals with which they cohabit. They feed on mycorrhizal fungi, plant detritus, and the seeds gathered by the mammals. Males have brief lives and live mostly on the surface. The breeding habits of sand cockroaches have been little studied but it seems that females emerge onto the surface at night, attract the winged males, perhaps by the use of pheromones, mate and rebury themselves in the sand.

The desert cockroach (A. investigata) has been shown to be able to absorb water from the atmosphere.
