= Anisogamia =

Scientific classification
- Domain: Eukaryota
- Kingdom: Animalia
- Phylum: Arthropoda
- Class: Insecta
- Order: Blattodea
- Family: Corydiidae
- Subfamily: Corydiinae
- Genus: Anisogamia; Saussure, 1893
- Species: A. tamerlana

Binomial name
- Anisogamia tamerlana Saussure, 1893

Genus of cockroaches

Anisogamia is a monotypic genus of cockroaches in the subfamily Corydiinae, erected by H. de Saussure in 1893, containing the species Anisogamia tamerlana Saussure from Turkmenistan.
