= Bucolion stygius =

Scientific classification
- Kingdom: Animalia
- Phylum: Arthropoda
- Clade: Pancrustacea
- Class: Insecta
- Order: Blattodea
- Family: Corydiidae
- Genus: Bucolion; Rehn, 1932
- Species: B. stygius

Binomial name
- Bucolion stygius Rehn, 1932

South American cockroach

Bucolion stygius is a species of cockroach found in South America. It is the sole species in the genus Bucolion.
