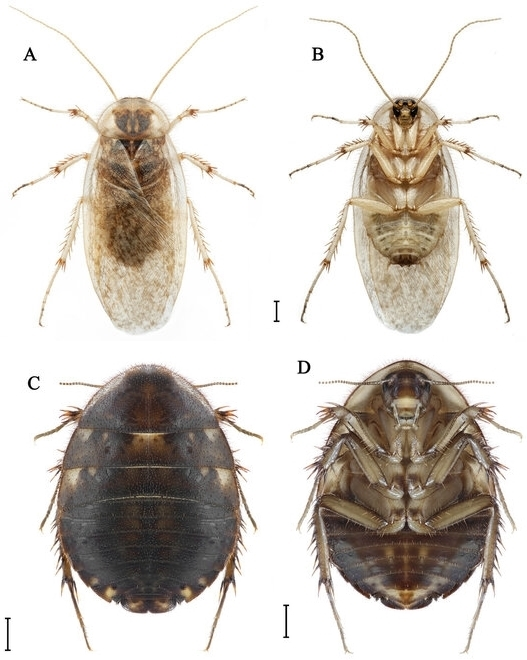
- Hemelytroblatta livida

Scientific classification
- Kingdom: Animalia
- Phylum: Arthropoda
- Clade: Pancrustacea
- Class: Insecta
- Order: Blattodea
- Family: Corydiidae
- Subfamily: Corydiinae
- Genus: Hemelytroblatta; Chopard, 1929

Synonyms
- Psammoblatta Bey-Bienko, 1950

= Hemelytroblatta =

Genus of cockroaches

External image
- Images at iNaturalist

Hemelytroblatta is a genus of mostly Palaearctic cockroaches, in the subfamily Corydiinae, erected by Lucien Chopard in 1929. Species are distributed mostly in: North Africa, eastern Mediterranean countries through to central Asia; the type species, Hemelytroblatta cypria is found only on Cyprus.

== Species ==
The Cockroach Species File lists:

1. Hemelytroblatta aethiopica (Chopard, 1929)
2. Hemelytroblatta afghana (Bey-Bienko, 1967)
3. Hemelytroblatta africana (Linnaeus, 1758)
4. Hemelytroblatta arenarum (Chopard, 1929)
5. Hemelytroblatta cerverae (Bolívar, 1886)
6. Hemelytroblatta curtipennis (Chopard, 1929)
7. Hemelytroblatta cypria Chopard, 1929 - type species
8. Hemelytroblatta dumonti (Chopard, 1929)
9. Hemelytroblatta ebneri (Chopard, 1929)
10. Hemelytroblatta fulvopicta (Adelung, 1903)
11. Hemelytroblatta fuscipennis (Chopard, 1929)
12. Hemelytroblatta gestroiana (Saussure, 1895)
13. Hemelytroblatta incerta (Chopard, 1929)
14. Hemelytroblatta intermedia (Chopard, 1929)
15. Hemelytroblatta latifrons (Chopard, 1929)
16. Hemelytroblatta livida (Brunner von Wattenwyl, 1865)
17. Hemelytroblatta longipes (Chopard, 1929)
18. Hemelytroblatta marismortui (Janson, 1891)
19. Hemelytroblatta minuta (Bey-Bienko, 1935)
20. Hemelytroblatta oblonga (Chopard, 1929)
21. Hemelytroblatta pilosella (Saussure, 1895)
22. Hemelytroblatta polyphagella (Bey-Bienko, 1963)
23. Hemelytroblatta roseni (Brancsik, 1898)
24. Hemelytroblatta rugosa (Schulthess, 1894)
25. Hemelytroblatta senegalensis (Chopard, 1929)
26. Hemelytroblatta subhyalina (Chopard, 1921)
27. Hemelytroblatta zavattarii (Salfi, 1935)
28. Hemelytroblatta zolotarevskyi (Chopard, 1940)
