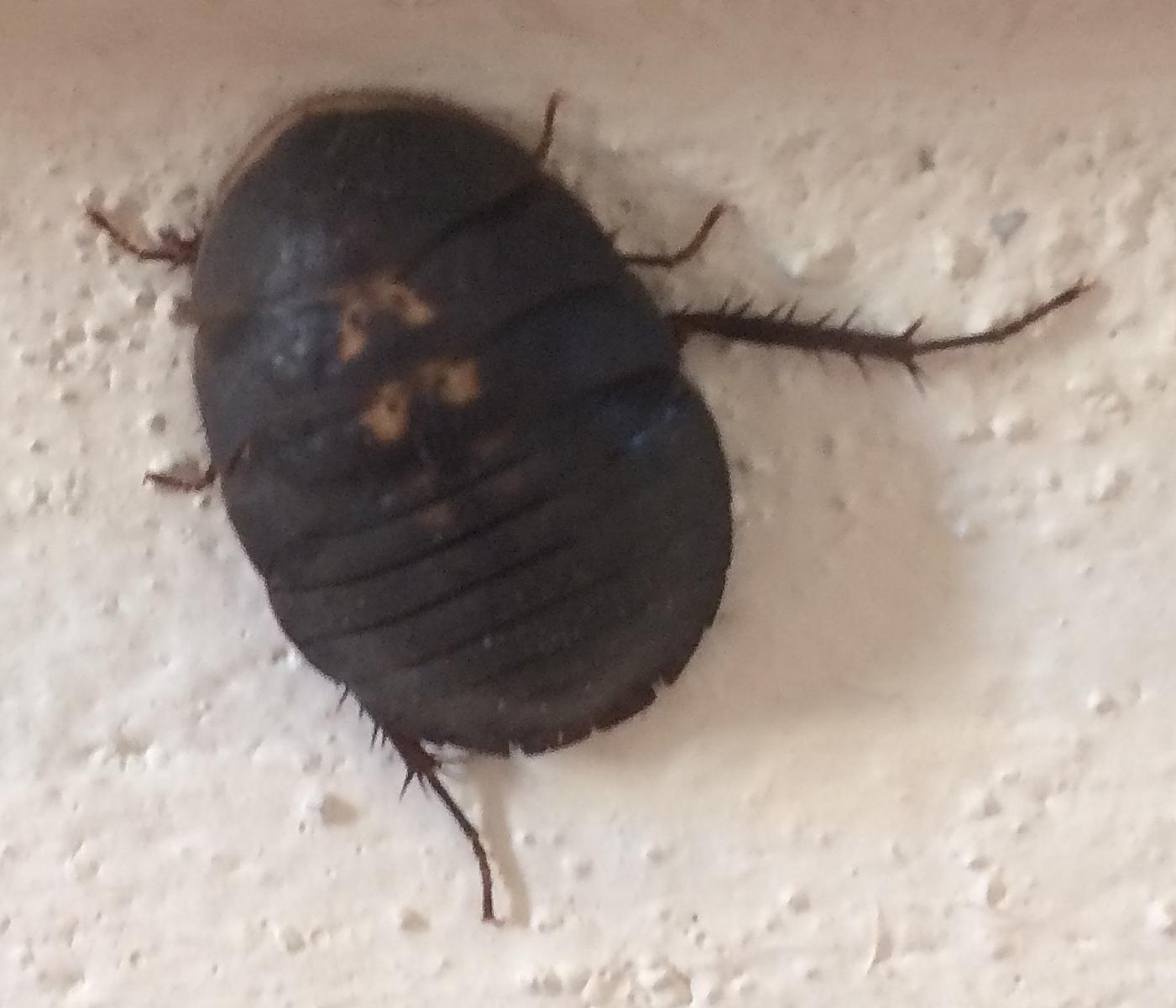
- Polyphaga aegyptiaca

Scientific classification
- Kingdom: Animalia
- Phylum: Arthropoda
- Clade: Pancrustacea
- Class: Insecta
- Order: Blattodea
- Family: Corydiidae
- Subfamily: Corydiinae
- Genus: Polyphaga; Brullé, 1835

Type species
- Blatta aegyptiaca Linnaeus, 1758

Synonyms
- Heterogamia Burmeister, 1838

= Polyphaga (cockroach) =

Genus of cockroaches

Polyphaga is a genus of sand cockroaches in the family Corydiidae.

== Species ==
The Cockroach Species File lists:

1. Polyphaga aegyptiaca (Linnaeus, 1758) - type species (as Blatta aegyptiaca L.)
2. Polyphaga indica Walker, 1868
3. Polyphaga obscura Chopard, 1929
4. Polyphaga plancyi Bolívar, 1883
5. Polyphaga saussurei (Dohrn, 1888)
