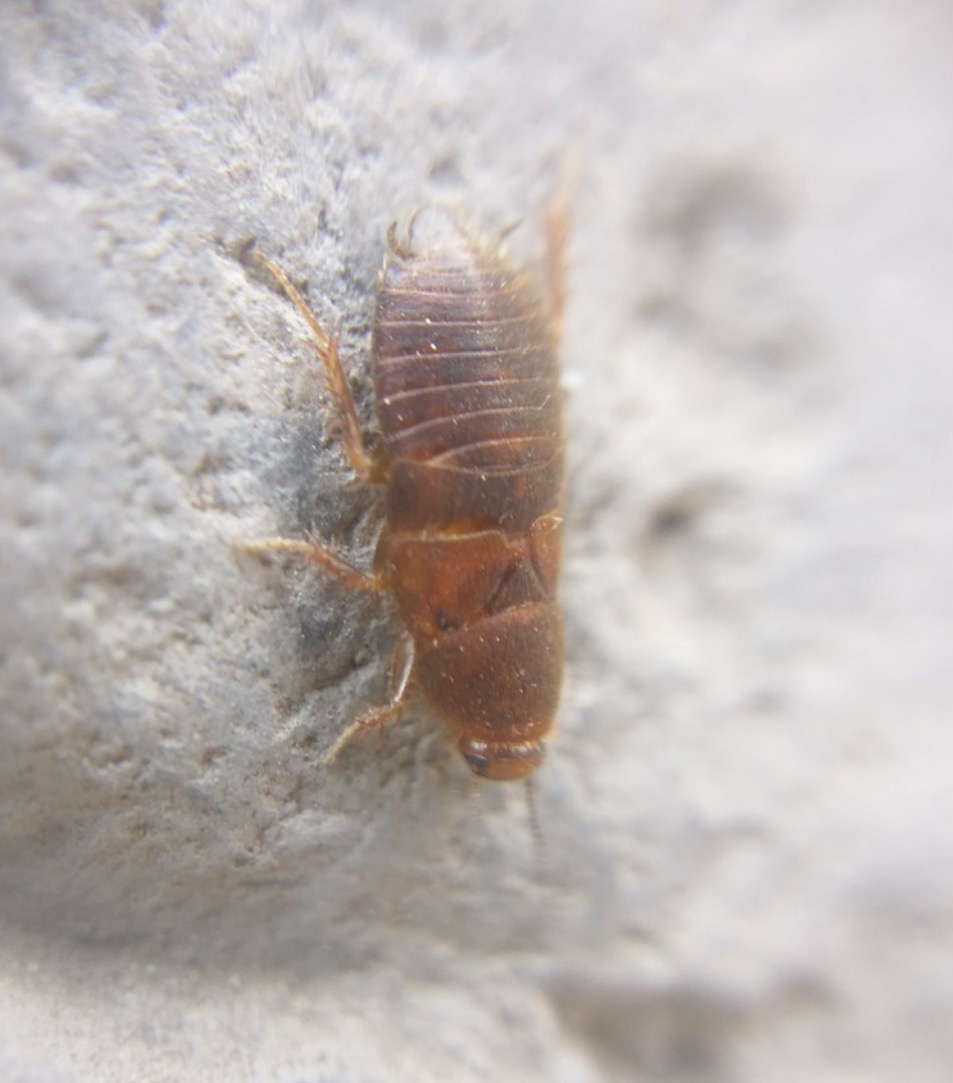
- Zetha simonyi in Lima, Peru

Scientific classification
- Kingdom: Animalia
- Phylum: Arthropoda
- Class: Insecta
- Order: Blattodea
- Family: Corydiidae
- Genus: Zetha; Shelford, 1913

= Zetha =

Genus of cockroaches

Zetha is a genus of cockroach in the family Blattidae represented by two species Zetha simonyi and Zetha vestita which are found in Peru, Ecuador, and Guatemala. However, some treat Zetha freyi and Zetha rufescens as distinct species.
