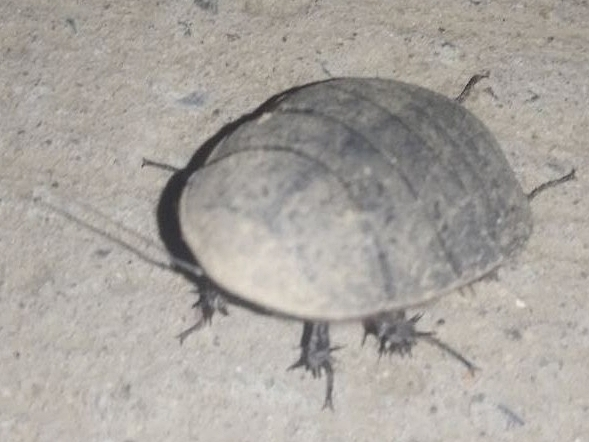

Scientific classification
- Kingdom: Animalia
- Phylum: Arthropoda
- Clade: Pancrustacea
- Class: Insecta
- Order: Blattodea
- Family: Corydiidae
- Genus: Polyphaga
- Species: P. saussurei

Binomial name
- Polyphaga saussurei (Dohrn, 1888)

Synonyms
- Heterogamia saussurei Dohrn, 1888 (basionym); Heterogamia pellucida Redtenbacher, 1889; Polyphaga pellucida (Redtenbacher, 1889); Polyphaga camelorum Kirby, 1903

= Polyphaga saussurei =

Species of cockroach

Polyphaga saussurei is a cockroach species distributed throughout Central (except Kyrgyzstan) and South Asia and the northeastern Caucasus. It is found in terrestrial habitats, and mainly lives in dry conditions. It can serve as a domestic pest in its natural habitat, although this is not incredibly common.

Based on genetic analysis of specimens in West Azerbaijan, Iran, it has been suggested that Polyphaga aegyptiaca and P. saussurei may actually be one species, despite the noticeable morphological differences.

== Morphology and life cycle ==
Polyphaga saussurei exhibits sexual dimorphism. Females are larger than males, ranging from 35 to 44 mm long at adulthood, while males range from 32 to 37 mm. Similar to other members of the genus, males have wings, while females are wingless. Both sexes may produce an unpleasant odor when disturbed.

Adults will begin mating 10–14 days after the final molt, after which there is a gestation period of approximately 60 days. Nymphs take as few as 121 days under ideal conditions to mature, or up to 18 months at less than ideal conditions (the primary factor being temperature). After maturity, adults may live for an additional 2.5 years.
