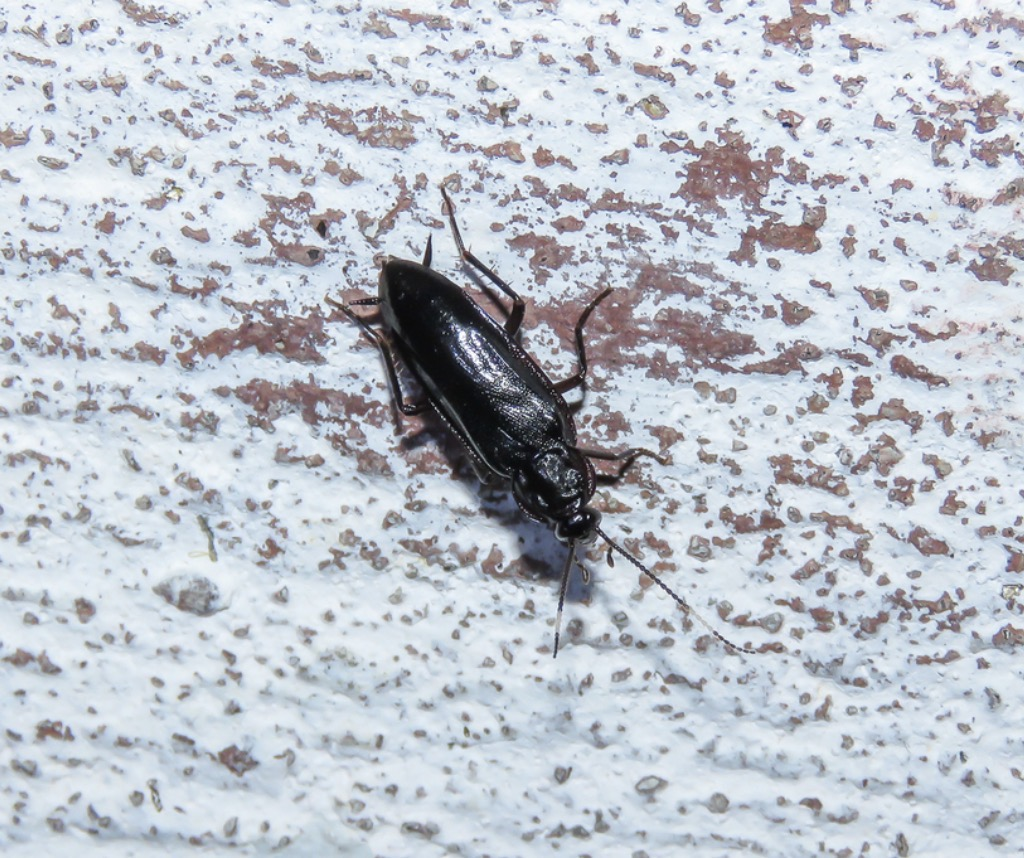
- Oulopteryx sp.

Scientific classification
- Kingdom: Animalia
- Phylum: Arthropoda
- Class: Insecta
- Order: Blattodea
- Family: Corydiidae
- Genus: Oulopteryx; Hebard, 1921

Type species
- Oulopteryx meliponarum Hebard, 1921

= Oulopteryx =

Genus of cockroaches

Oulopteryx is a genus of medium-small cockroaches in the family Corydiidae found in tropical South America.

== Taxonomy and systematics ==
The genus Oulopteryx was described by Hebard in 1921, with O. meliponarum designated as the genotype. It is considered an aberrant member of the Corydiinae, placed in linear arrangement after Buhohlatta and before Ceuthobiella. The curled wings show a development from a very different stock than related genera, with a further development of the type found in the Ectobine genus Theganopteryx.

== Description ==
The genus is characterized by medium-small size and an elongate elliptical form. The head is slightly longer than broad, with well-separated eyes and absent ocelli. The pronotum is shining and coriaceous, thickly impresso-punctate, with a strong transverse impression before the cephalic margin. The tegmina are coriaceous and polished, thickly impresso-punctate. The wings are exceptionally large for the body bulk and have a large appendicular field, which folds and curls into a tight roll when at rest. The ventral femoral margins are unarmed except for a single distal spine on the ventro-cephalic margin of the cephalic femora. Pulvilli and arolia are absent.

== Species ==
- Oulopteryx dascilloides Hebard, 1921 — French Guiana.
- Oulopteryx meliponarum Hebard, 1921 — Brazil (first blattid known to be symbiotic with bees)
