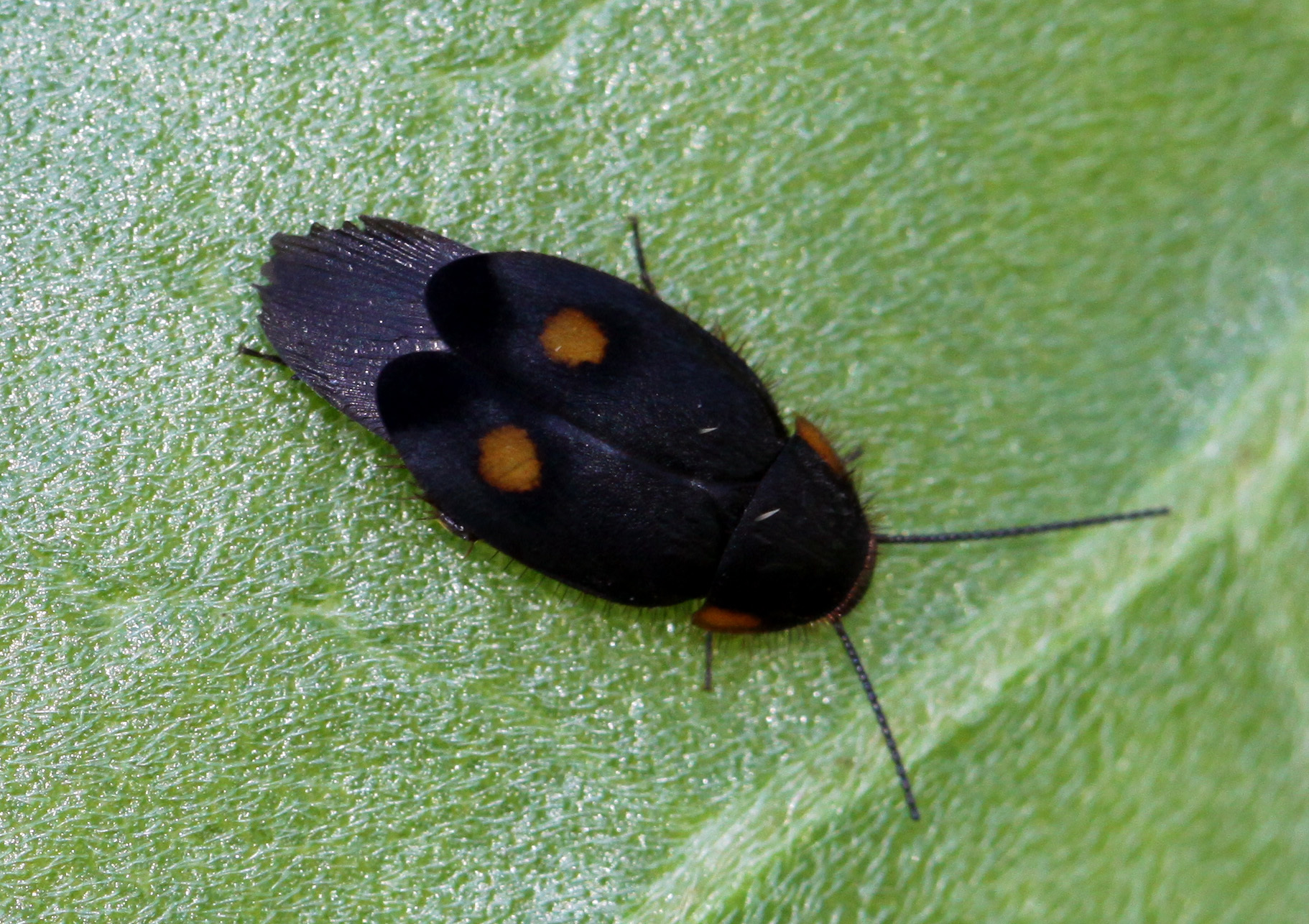
- Euthyrrhapha pacifica

Scientific classification
- Kingdom: Animalia
- Phylum: Arthropoda
- Clade: Pancrustacea
- Class: Insecta
- Order: Blattodea
- Family: Corydiidae
- Genus: Euthyrrhapha; Burmeister, 1838

Species
- Euthyrrhapha pacifica; Euthyrrhapha bigeminata; Euthyrrhapha bimaculata; Euthyrrhapha metallica; Euthyrrhapha nigra; Euthyrrhapha obscura; Euthyrrhapha tenella; Euthyrrhapha termitophilia; Euthyrrhapha vittata

= Euthyrrhapha =

Genus of cockroaches

Euthyrrhapha (or Enthyrrhapha), is a genus of sand cockroaches in the family Corydiidae. It is the only genus in the subfamily Euthyrrhaphinae. Members of this genus have been found throughout South America, Africa, as well as on the Hawaiian Islands. Like many other genera within their family, they are terrestrial, nocturnal, and exhibit hemimetabolism.
