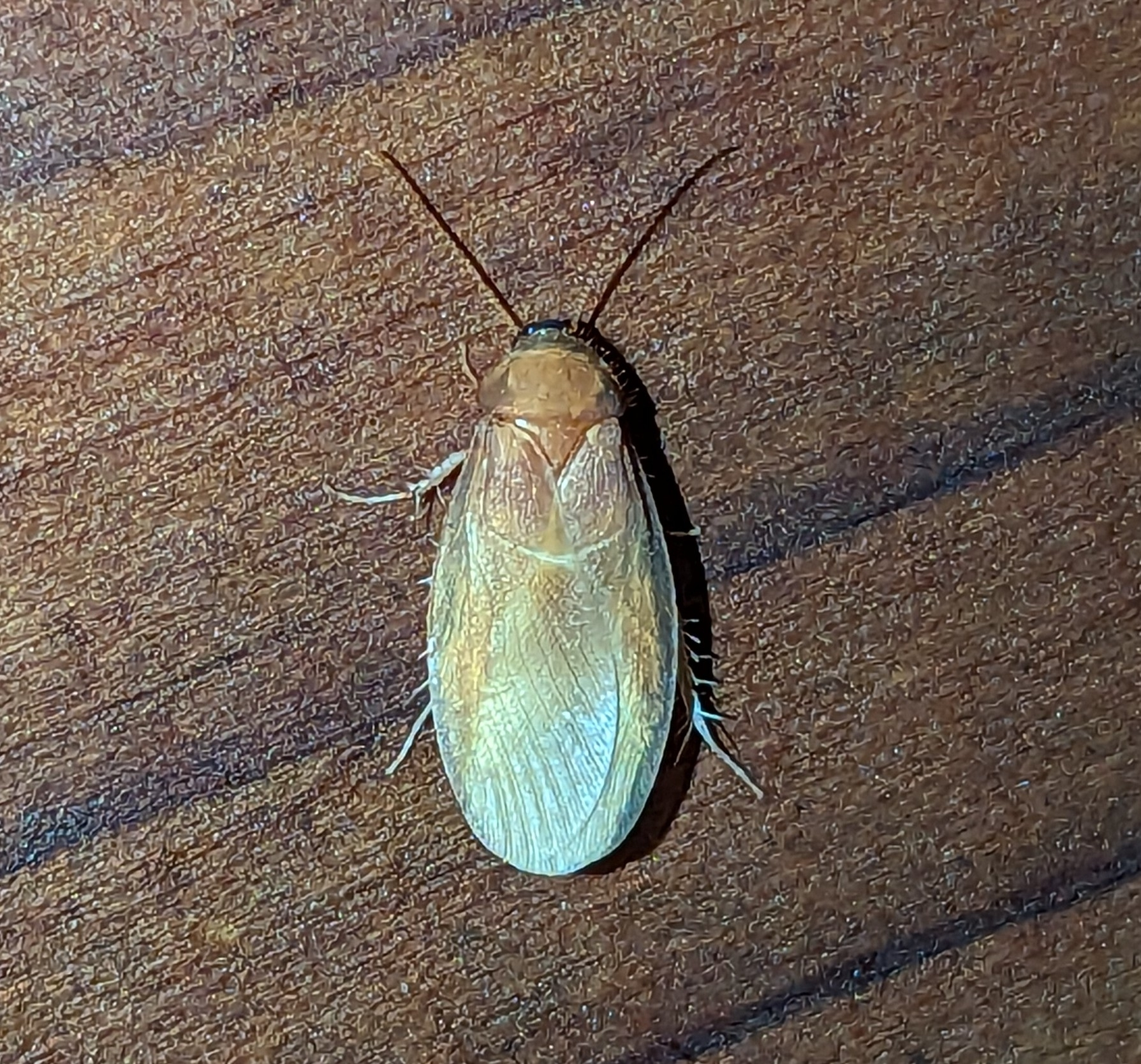
- Tivia, Botswana

Scientific classification
- Kingdom: Animalia
- Phylum: Arthropoda
- Class: Insecta
- Order: Blattodea
- Family: Corydiidae
- Subfamily: Tiviinae
- Genus: Tivia; Walker, 1869

Synonyms
- Hemilatindia Saussure, 1895; Polyphagella Chopard, 1929; Pseudogynopeltis Karny, 1908

= Tivia =

Genus of cockroaches

Tivia is a genus of cockroaches in the family Corydiidae. There are about 15 described species in Tivia, found in Sub-Saharan Africa and Western Australia.

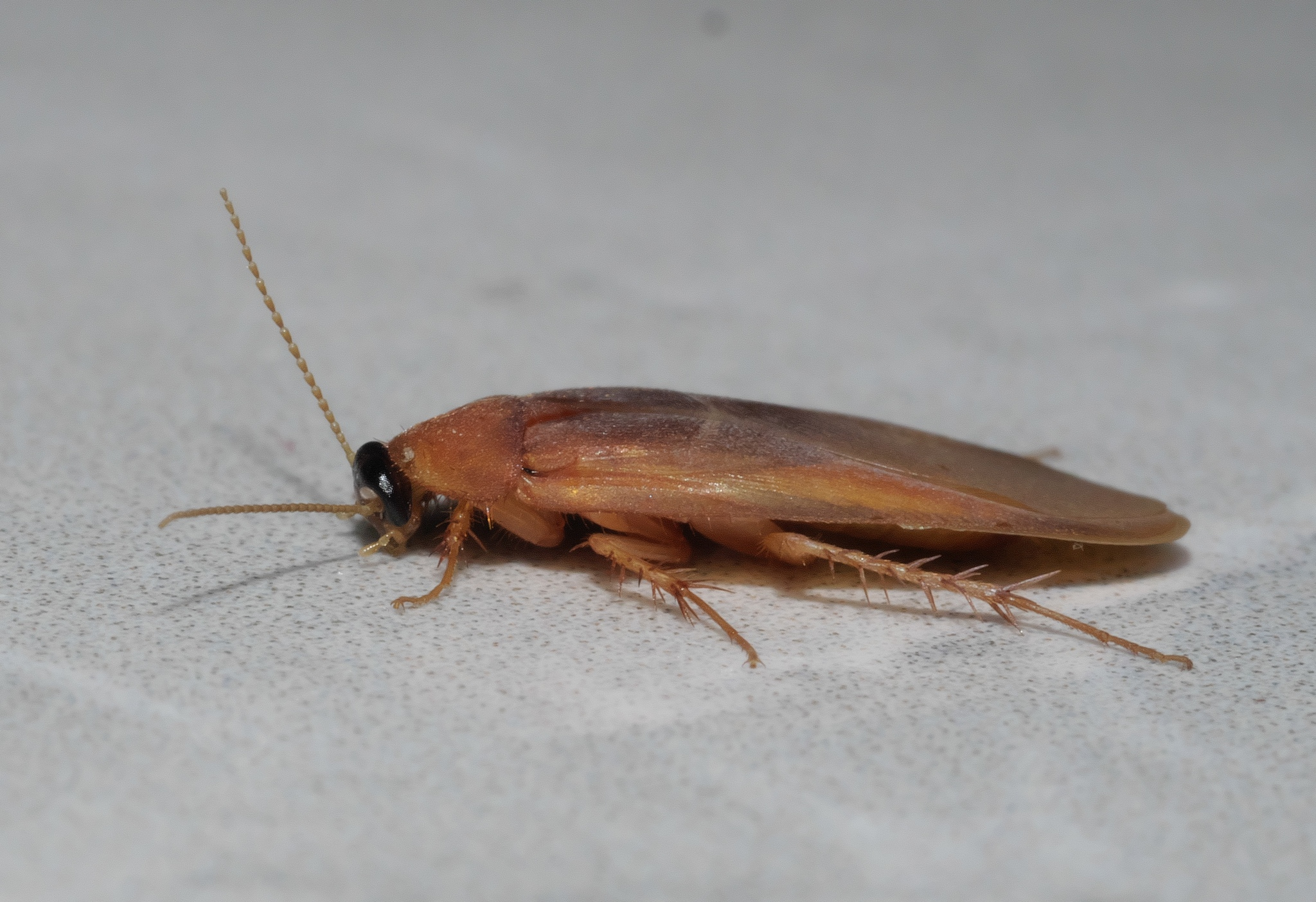
Tivia, Namibia

== Species ==
These 15 species belong to the genus Tivia:

- Tivia appropinquata Bohn, 2006
- Tivia australica Princis, 1954
- Tivia brevipennis Princis, 1967
- Tivia distans Bohn, 2006
- Tivia doriana (Saussure, 1895)
- Tivia fratercula Rehn, 1922
- Tivia fulva (Burmeister, 1838)
- Tivia fusca Bohn, 2008
- Tivia inconspicua Bei-Bienko, 1950
- Tivia mjoebergi Princis, 1967
- Tivia senex Princis, 1967
- Tivia simulatrix Walker, 1869
- Tivia termes (Karny, 1908)
- Tivia termitium (Shelford, 1910)
- Tivia vestigialana Roth, 2003
