= Oreocalamus hanitschi =

Conservation status
- Least Concern (IUCN 3.1)

Scientific classification
- Kingdom: Animalia
- Phylum: Chordata
- Class: Reptilia
- Order: Squamata
- Suborder: Serpentes
- Family: Colubridae
- Genus: Oreocalamus; Boulenger, 1899
- Species: O. hanitschi

Binomial name
- Oreocalamus hanitschi Boulenger, 1899

Genus of snakes

Oreocalamus is a genus of snake in the family Colubridae of the superfamily Colubroidea. The genus Oreocalamus is a monotypic taxon that contains the sole species Oreocalamus hanitschi. O. hanitschi is commonly known as Hanitsch's reed snake, the Kalimantan burrowing snake, and the mountain reed snake. It is found in Malaysia.

== Etymology ==
The specific name, hanitschi, is in honor of German biologist Karl Richard Hanitsch.

== Habitat ==
The preferred natural habitat of O. hanitschi is forest, at altitudes of 1,100–1,700 m (3,600–5,600 ft).

== Diet ==
O. hanitschi preys upon earthworms.

== Reproduction ==
O. hanitschi is oviparous.
