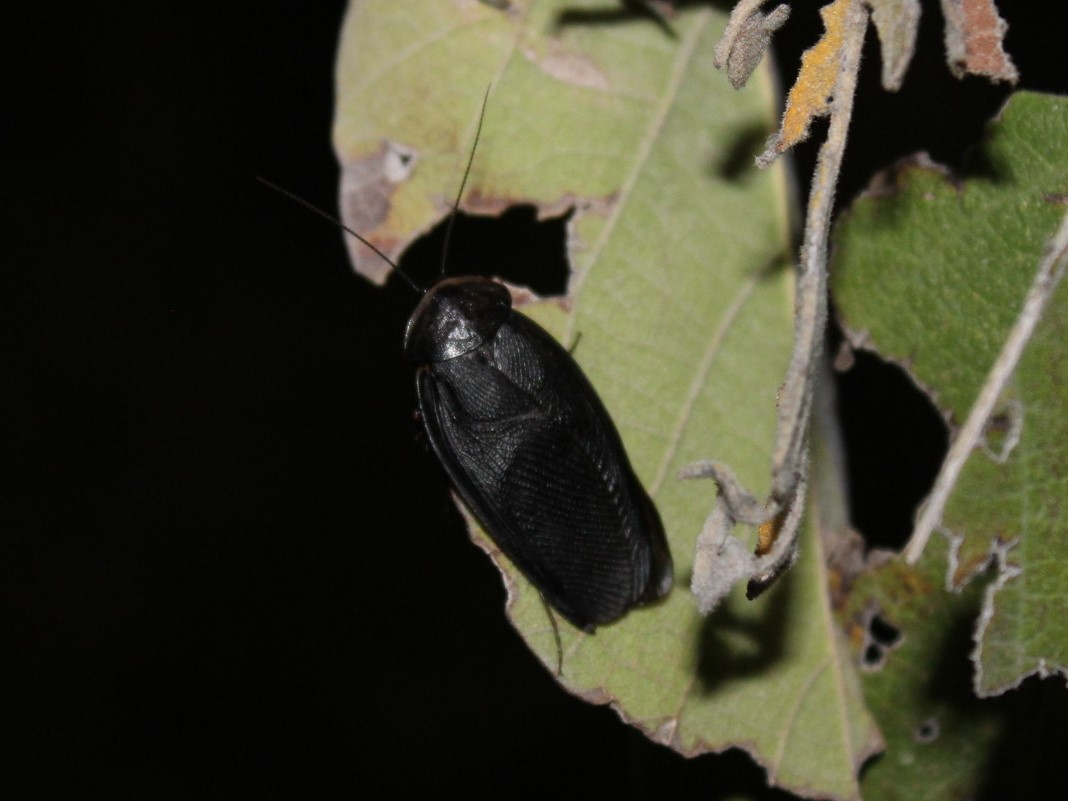
- Eremoblatta hirsuta

Scientific classification
- Kingdom: Animalia
- Phylum: Arthropoda
- Clade: Pancrustacea
- Class: Insecta
- Order: Blattodea
- Family: Corydiidae
- Genus: Eremoblatta; Rehn, 1903

Type species
- Homoeogamia subdiaphana Scudder, 1902

Species
- Eremoblatta hirsuta; Eremoblatta subdiaphana

= Eremoblatta =

Genus of cockroaches

Eremoblatta is a genus of sand cockroaches in the family Corydiidae.
