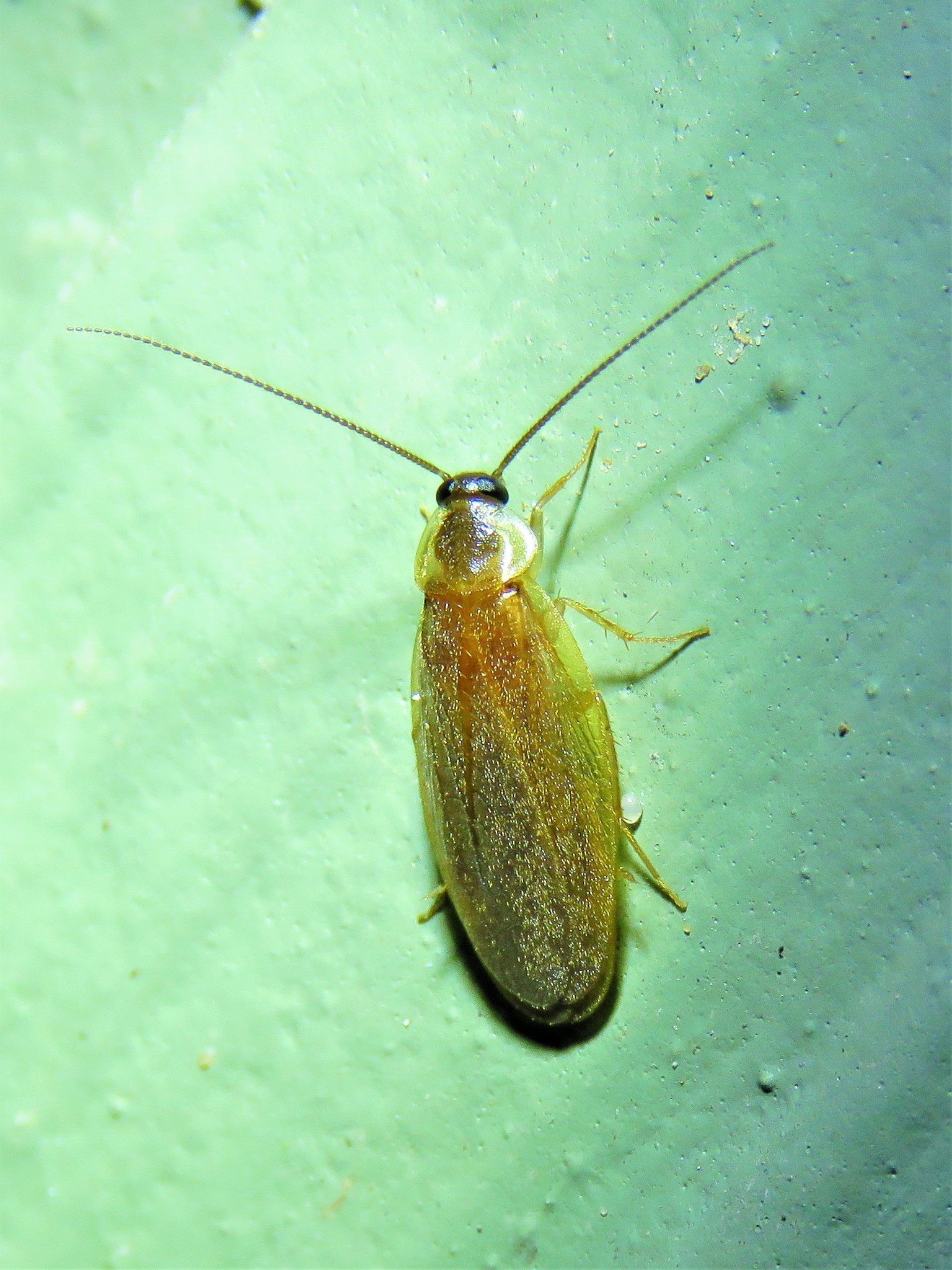
- Compsodes schwarzi, Texas

Scientific classification
- Domain: Eukaryota
- Kingdom: Animalia
- Phylum: Arthropoda
- Class: Insecta
- Order: Blattodea
- Family: Corydiidae
- Subfamily: Latindiinae
- Genus: Compsodes; Hebard, 1917

= Compsodes =

Genus of cockroaches

Compsodes is a genus of hooded cockroaches in the family Corydiidae. There are at least four described species in Compsodes.

== Species ==
These four species belong to the genus Compsodes:

- Compsodes cucullatus (Saussure & Zehntner, 1894) - hooded cockroach (Central and North America)
- Compsodes delicatulus (Saussure & Zehntner, 1894) (Guatemala)
- Compsodes perezgelaberti Gutiérrez, 2012 (Dominican Republic)
- Compsodes schwarzi (Caudell, 1903) - Schwarz's hooded cockroach (Central and North America)

Research published in 2022 has placed the species Latindia mexicanus in Compsodes, although this is not yet widely accepted.
