= Richard Hanitsch =

German-born entomologist and museum curator

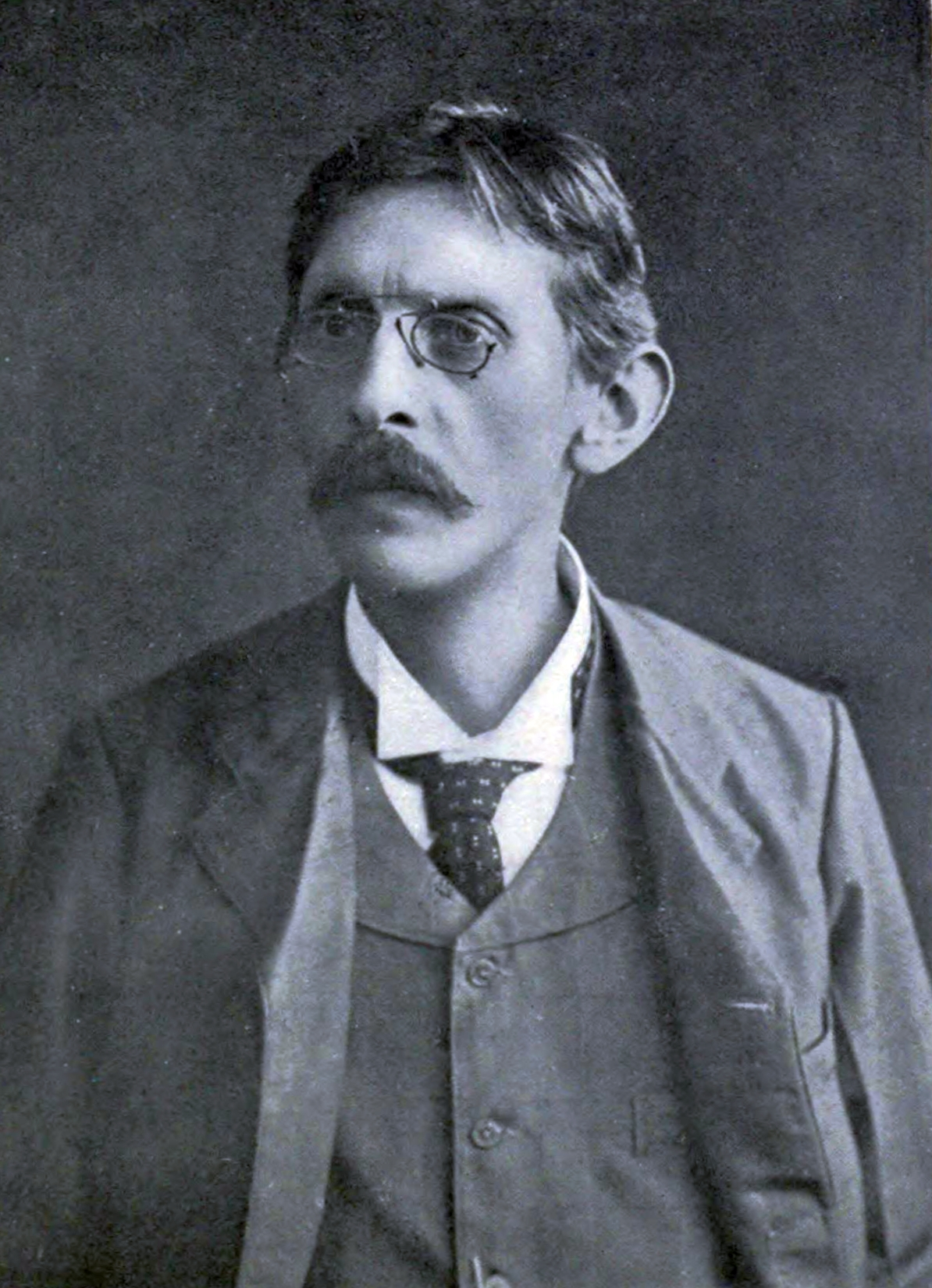

Karl Richard Hanitsch (22 December 1860 – 11 August 1940) was a German-born entomologist and museum curator who served as the director of the Raffles Museum in Singapore in the early 20th century.

Hanitsch was born at Grossenstein in Thuringia, Germany where his father Victor was a schoolmaster. He studied at the University of Jena, where he obtained his PhD. From 1887 to 1895 he was employed as a demonstrator of zoology at University College, Liverpool. He married Ethel Vernon in 1892, with whom he had two sons and three daughters. From 1895 to 1907 he was Curator (the previous curator of the museum, William Ruxton Davison died in 1893) and Librarian of the Raffles Library and Museum, becoming in 1908 the first Director of the museum, a position he held until 1919. He was especially successful at building up the library collection there. He also served as the Honorary Treasurer of the Straits Branch of the Royal Asiatic Society.

Although Hanitsch’s principal research interest lay in entomology, particularly the roaches, he also worked on sponges, birds, amphibians, and mammals. He made trips to collect in the region including one to Christmas Island with Henry Ridley in 1904. As curator of the Raffles Museum he also examined artefacts such as coins that came into the museum. He retired on 7 July 1919 and returned to England. His successor as Director was Major John Moulton. After retirement he regularly visited the entomology department at Oxford right until his death.

Hanitsch is commemorated in a number of taxa including a snake, Oreocalamus hanitschi, a frog Ansonia hanitschi, five species of cockroach: Ancaudellia hanitschi, Ctenoneura hanitschi, Deropeltis hanitschi, Ectoneura hanitschi, Gyna hanitschi, a genus of cockroaches Hanitschia, a fossil gastropod Gervillia hanitschi, and a sponge Myxodoryx hanitschi. A 1978 postal stamp from Christmas Island commemorates him in a series on "famous visitors".
