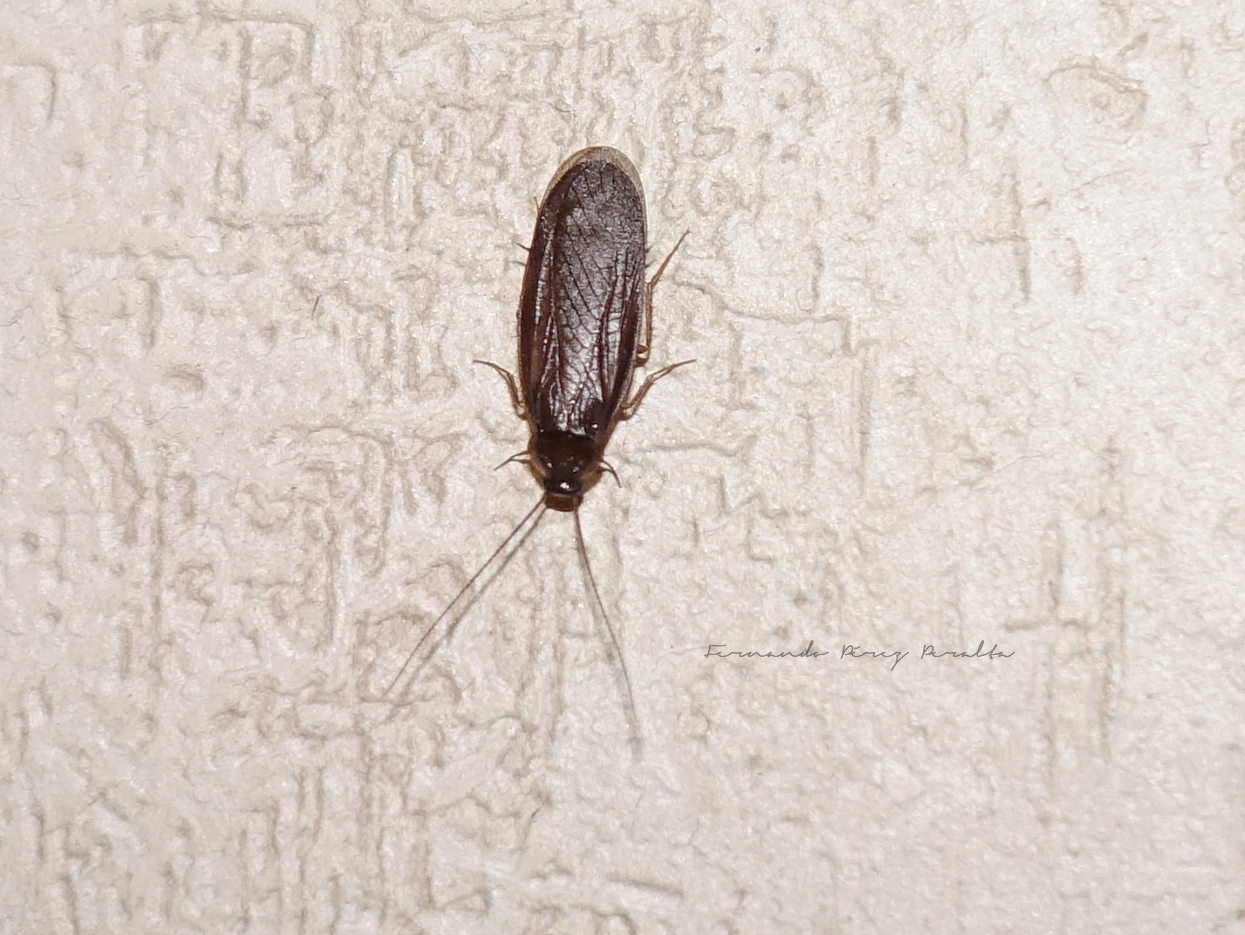
- Latindia mexicanus, México

Scientific classification
- Kingdom: Animalia
- Phylum: Arthropoda
- Clade: Pancrustacea
- Class: Insecta
- Order: Blattodea
- Family: Corydiidae
- Subfamily: Latindiinae
- Genus: Latindia; Stål, 1860

= Latindia =

Genus of cockroaches

Latindia is a genus of cockroaches in the family Corydiidae. There are about nine described species in Latindia.

== Species ==
These nine species belong to the genus Latindia:

- Latindia castanea Brunner von Wattenwyl, 1893 (Caribbean)
- Latindia catharinensis Rocha e Silva, 1971 (Brazil)
- Latindia dohrniana Saussure & Zehntner, 1894 (Central and South America)
- Latindia inca Saussure & Zehntner, 1894 (Peru)
- Latindia maurella Stål, 1860 (Brazil)
- Latindia mexicanus Saussure, 1868 (Mexico)
- Latindia pectinata Rehn, 1937 (Brazil)
- Latindia pusilla Saussure & Zehntner, 1894 (Peru)
- Latindia signata Brunner von Wattenwyl, 1865 (Brazil)

Research in 2022 has placed the species Latindia mexicanus in the genus Compsodes, although this is not yet widely accepted.
