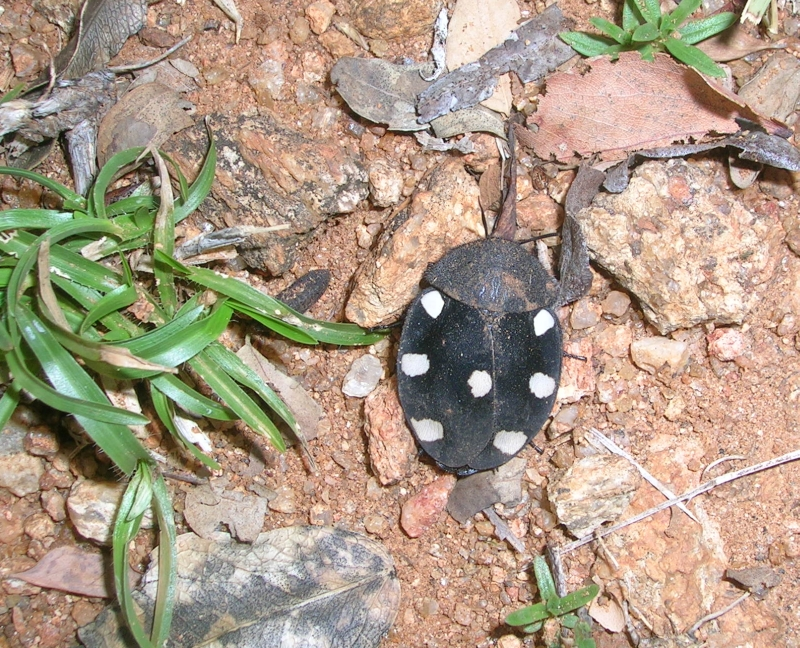
- Therea bernhardti

Scientific classification
- Kingdom: Animalia
- Phylum: Arthropoda
- Clade: Pancrustacea
- Class: Insecta
- Order: Blattodea
- Family: Corydiidae
- Genus: Therea; Billberg, 1820

Type species
- Cassida petiveriana Linnaeus, 1758

Synonyms
- Corydia Serville, 1831

= Therea (insect) =

Genus of cockroaches

Therea is a genus of crepuscular cockroach found in South, East and Central India and in Sri Lanka. Its species are found on the ground or at low levels in vegetation in lowland and foothill forests and woodlands that vary from dry to semi-humid. Adults are generally 1.5–2.8 cm (0.6–1.1 in) long and black with contrasting markings in whitish or orange (depending on species). The genus includes some species that are popular as pets.

== Species ==
Species in the genus include:

- T. bernhardti Fritzsche, 2009 - Thiruvannamalai
- T. defranceschii Grandcolas, 1993 - Bellary
- T. hyperguttata Grandcolas, 1993 - Bellary
- T. irreperta Fritzsche, 2009 - central India
- T. nuptialis (Gerstaecker, 1861) - Orissa
- T. olegrandjeani Fritzsche & Zompro, 2008 - Gooty, Andhra Pradesh
- T. petiveriana (Linnaeus, 1758) - Sri Lanka
- T. regularis Grandcolas, 1993 - Gingee, Madras
