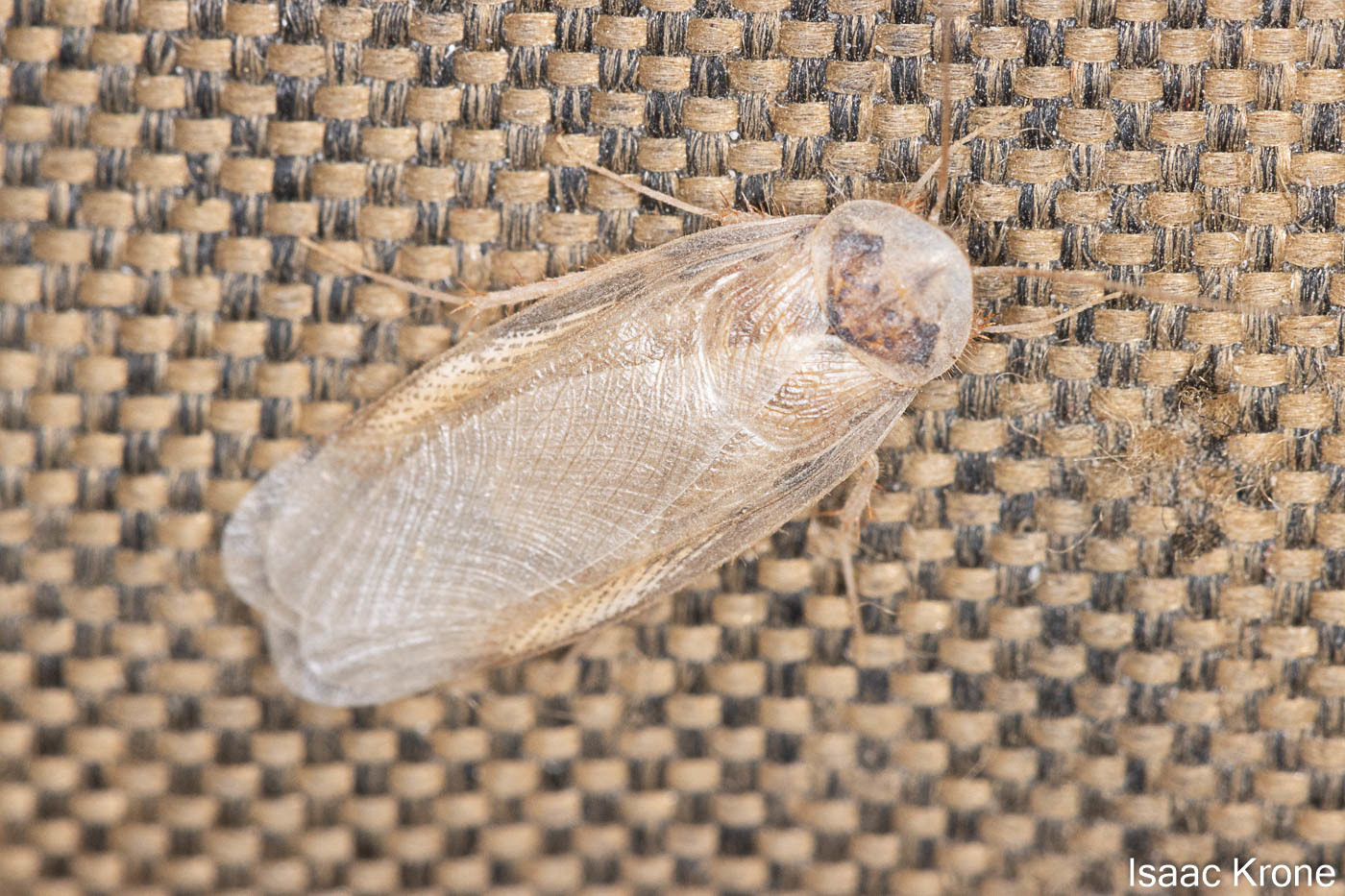

Scientific classification
- Kingdom: Animalia
- Phylum: Arthropoda
- Clade: Pancrustacea
- Class: Insecta
- Order: Blattodea
- Family: Corydiidae
- Genus: Arenivaga
- Species: A. investigata

Binomial name
- Arenivaga investigata Friauf and Edney, 1969

= Arenivaga investigata =

Desert cockroach

Species of cockroach

Arenivaga investigata, also known as the desert cockroach, is a member of the cockroach family Corydiidae.

== Distribution ==
Arenivaga investigata is abundant in sand dunes of the Colorado desert at the foot of San Jacinto Peak, California.

== Water vapor absorption ==
The desert cockroach can gain weight by absorption of water vapor from unsaturated atmospheres above 82.5% relative humidity. Blocking the anus or the dorsal surface with wax does not prevent water vapor uptake, but interference with movements of the mouthparts or blocking the mouth with wax prevents such uptake. Weight gains are associated with the protrusion from the mouth of two bladder-like extensions of the hypopharynx. During absorption these structures are warmer than the surrounding mouthparts, their surface temperature increasing with relative humidity. This suggests that the surfaces of the bladder-like structures function at least as sites for condensation of water vapor, but the precise location of its transfer into the hemolymph has not yet been identified.
