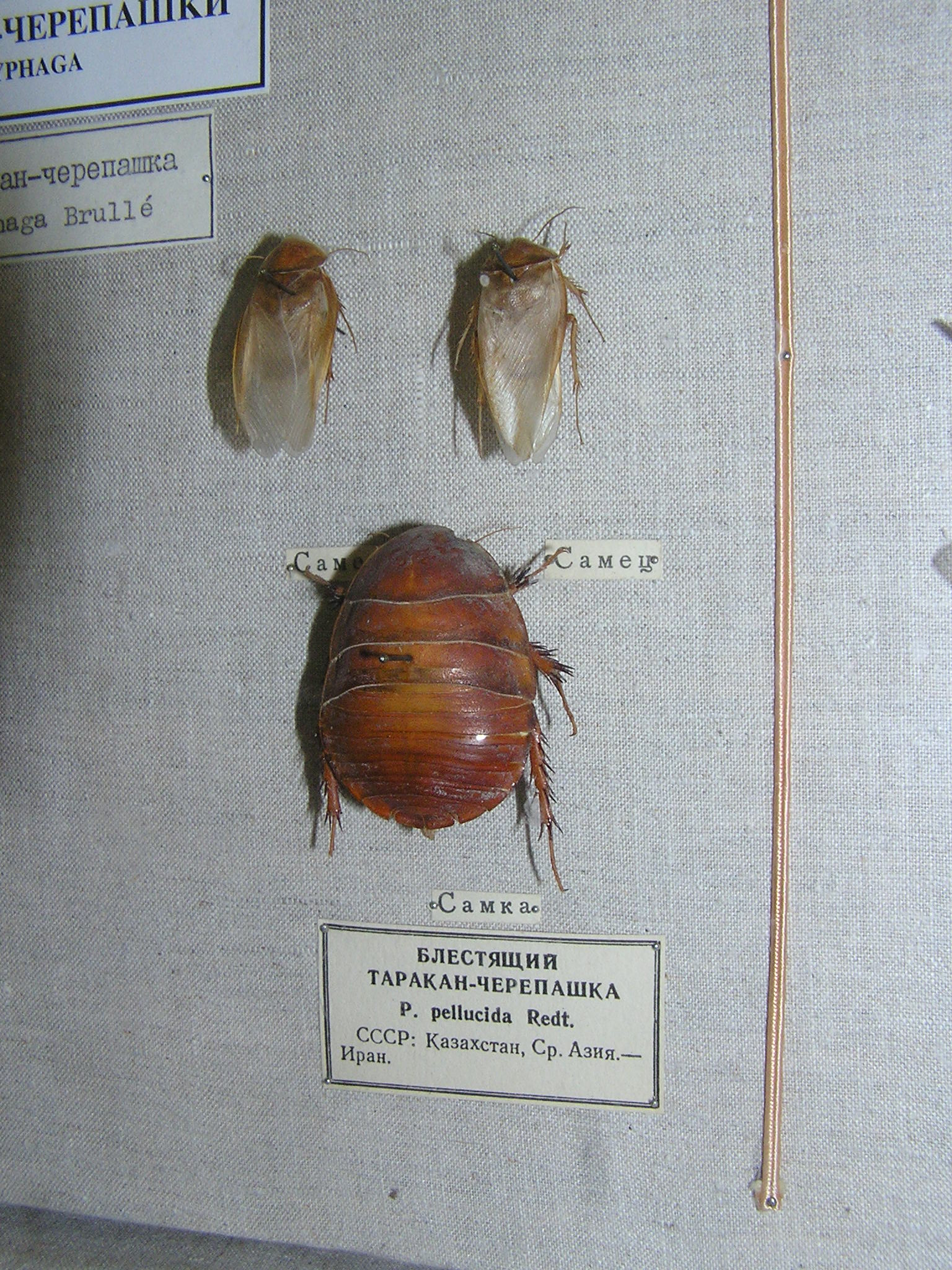
- Polyphaga pellucida in the Saint Petersburg Zoological Museum

Scientific classification
- Kingdom: Animalia
- Phylum: Arthropoda
- Class: Insecta
- Order: Blattodea
- Superfamily: Corydioidea
- Family: Corydiidae; Saussure & Zehntner, 1893

Subfamilies
- Corydiinae; Euthyrrhaphinae; Holocompsinae; Latindiinae; Tiviinae

Synonyms
- Polyphagidae

= Corydiidae =

Corydiidae Temporal range: Late Jurassic–Present

Family of cockroaches

Corydiidae, previously known as Polyphagidae, is a family of the order Blattodea (cockroaches). Many are known as sand cockroaches. The family is divided into five subfamilies, comprising some 40 genera. One prominent species is the desert cockroach, Arenivaga investigata.

== Genera ==
=== Corydiinae ===
Selected genera:

- Anisogamia
- Arenivaga
- Eremoblatta
- Eucorydia
- Hemelytroblatta
- Polyphaga
- Therea (=Corydia)

=== Latindiinae ===
1. Buboblatta Hebard, 1920
2. Bucolion Rehn, 1932: Bucolion stygius
3. Compsodes Hebard, 1917
4. Gapudipentax Lucañas, 2018
5. Latindia Stål, 1860
6. Melestora Stål, 1860
7. Myrmecoblatta Mann, 1914
8. Paralatindia Saussure, 1868
9. Sinolatindia Qiu, Che & Wang, 2016
10. Stenoblatta Walker, 1868
11. †Okruhliak Vršanský & Hinkelman in Vršanský et al., 2022 Karabastau Formation, Kazakhstan, Kimmeridgian and Burmese Amber, Myanmar, Cenomanian

=== Tiviinae ===
1. Simblerastes Rehn & Hebard, 1927
2. Sphecophila Shelford, 1907
3. Tivia Walker, 1869

=== Euthyrrhaphinae ===
1. Euthyrrhapha Burmeister, 1838

=== Holocompsinae ===
1. Holocompsa Burmeister, 1838
2. †Sajda Vršanský in Vršanský et al., 2021 Algeria, Hauterivian

=== Incertae sedis ===
==== Extant genera ====
1. Anacompsa Shelford, 1910
2. Ctenoneura Hanitsch, 1925
3. Homopteroidea Shelford, 1906
4. Ipisoma Bolívar, 1893
5. Ipolatta Karny, 1914
6. Melyroidea Shelford, 1912
7. Oulopteryx Hebard, 1921
8. Pholadoblatta Rehn & Hebard, 1927
9. Zetha Shelford, 1913

==== Extinct genera ====
- †Afrophaga Vršanský in Vršanský et al., 2021 Algeria, Hauterivian
- †Bimodala Šmídová in Vršanský et al., 2019 Burmese amber, Myanmar, Cenomanian
- †Bimini Vršanský in Vršanský et al., 2022 Chulym-Yenisei Depression, Russia, Late Jurassic
- †Corydoblatta Hinkelman & Vršanský in Vršanský et al., 2022 Burmese amber, Myanmar, Cenomanian
- †Cretaholocompsa Martínez-Delclòs, 1993 Karabastau Formation, Kazakhstan, Kimmeridgian and La Pedrera de Rúbies Formation, Spain, Barremian
- †Fragosublatta Chen, Shih & Ren in Chen et al., 2021 Burmese amber, Myanmar, Cenomanian
- †Magniocula Qiu et al., 2019 Burmese amber, Myanmar, Cenomanian
- †Nodosigalea Li & Huang, 2018 Burmese amber, Myanmar, Cenomanian
- †Obscuroblatta Hinkelman & Vršanský in Vršanský et al., 2022 Burmese amber, Myanmar, Cenomanian
- †Piloscutumus Sendi in Vršanský et al., 2022 Burmese amber, Myanmar, Cenomanian
- †Pokemon Vršanská, Hinkelman & Vršanský in Vršanský et al., 2022 Burmese amber, Myanmar, Cenomanian
- †Spinka Vršanský, Šmídová & Barna in Vršanský et al., 2019 Burmese amber, Myanmar, Cenomanian
- †Squamicaputa Hinkelman & Koubová in Vršanský et al., 2022 Burmese amber, Myanmar, Cenomanian
