= List of cockroaches of Sri Lanka =

Sri Lanka is a tropical island situated close to the southern tip of India. The invertebrate fauna is as large as it is common to other regions of the world. There are about 2 million species of arthropods found in the world, and counting.

The following list is about Cockroaches recorded in Sri Lanka.

== Cockroach ==
Phylum: Arthropoda
Class: Insecta
Order: Blattodea

Cockroaches are insects of the order Blattodea, which also includes termites. About 30 cockroach species out of 4,600 are associated with human habitats. About four species are well known as pests. Cockroaches are somewhat generalized insects without special adaptations like the sucking mouthparts of Hemiptera; they have chewing mouthparts and are likely among the most primitive of living neopteran insects. They are common and hardy insects, and can tolerate a wide range of environments from Arctic cold to tropical heat. Tropical cockroaches are often much bigger than temperate species, and, contrary to popular opinion, extinct cockroach relatives and 'roachoids' such as the Carboniferous Archimylacris and the Permian Apthoroblattina were not as large as the biggest modern species.

Cockroaches are members of the order Blattodea, which includes the termites, a group of insects once thought to be separate from cockroaches. Currently, there are 4,600 species described and over 460 genera worldwide.

The following list provide the cockroaches currently identified in Sri Lanka. An exclusive update and taxonomic research on cockroaches in Sri Lanka has been not under taken so far by the scientific community. With records and few earlier studies, they have found that 66 species of cockroaches can be found from Sri Lanka, belongs to 6 families and 31 genera.

Endemic species are denoted as E.

=== Family: Blaberidae - Giant cockroaches ===
- Ancaudellia lobipennis
- Corydidarum humbertiana
- Diploptera punctata
- Indoapterolampra rugosiuscula
- Morphna lucida
- Morphna plana
- Panesthia plagiata
- Phlebonotus pallens
- Pseudoglomeris glomeris
- Pycnoscelus indicus
- Pycnoscelus nigra
- Pycnoscelus surinamensis
- Rhabdoblatta subsparsa
- Rhabdoblatta terranea
- Salganea passaloides
  - Salganea passaloides passaloides
- Stictolampra punctata
- Stilpnoblatta opaca
- Thorax porcellana

=== Family: Blattidae - Household cockroaches ===
- Dorylaea archershee
- Dorylaea zeylanica
- Neostylopyga parallela
- Neostylopyga rhombifolia
- Periplaneta americana
- Periplaneta australasiae
- Periplaneta ceylonica
- Pelmatosilpha princisi
- Pelmatosilpha sinhalensis
- Thyrsocera spectabilis

=== Family: Corydiidae - Sand cockroaches ===
- Euthyrrhapha pacifica
- Holocompsa debilis
- Therea petiveriana

=== Family: Ectobiidae - Wood cockroaches ===
- Allacta diluta
- Allacta figurata
- Anaplecta avicharapura
- Anaplecta erythronota
- Anaplecta galathea
- Anaplecta gyrinoides
- Anaplecta karakoush
- Anaplecta kekilla
- Anaplecta marshallae
- Anaplecta ratnadvipa
- Anaplecta srilanka
- Anaplecta thwaitesi
- Anaplecta zeylanica
- Anaplectella maculata
- Anaplectella pilatus
- Anaplectella thwaitesi
- Anaplectella warreni
- Anaplectoidea modesta
- Balta notulata
- Balta reticulata
- Blattella asahinai
- Blattella biligata
- Blattella bisignata
- Blattella germanica
- Blattella humbertiana
- Blattella lituricollis
- Blattella parvula
- Blattella vaga
- Delosia ornata
- Delosia sabaragamua
- Liosilpha pumicata
- Margattea ceylanica
- Supella longipalpa

=== Family: Nocticolidae ===
- Cardacus willeyi
- Nocticola rohini
