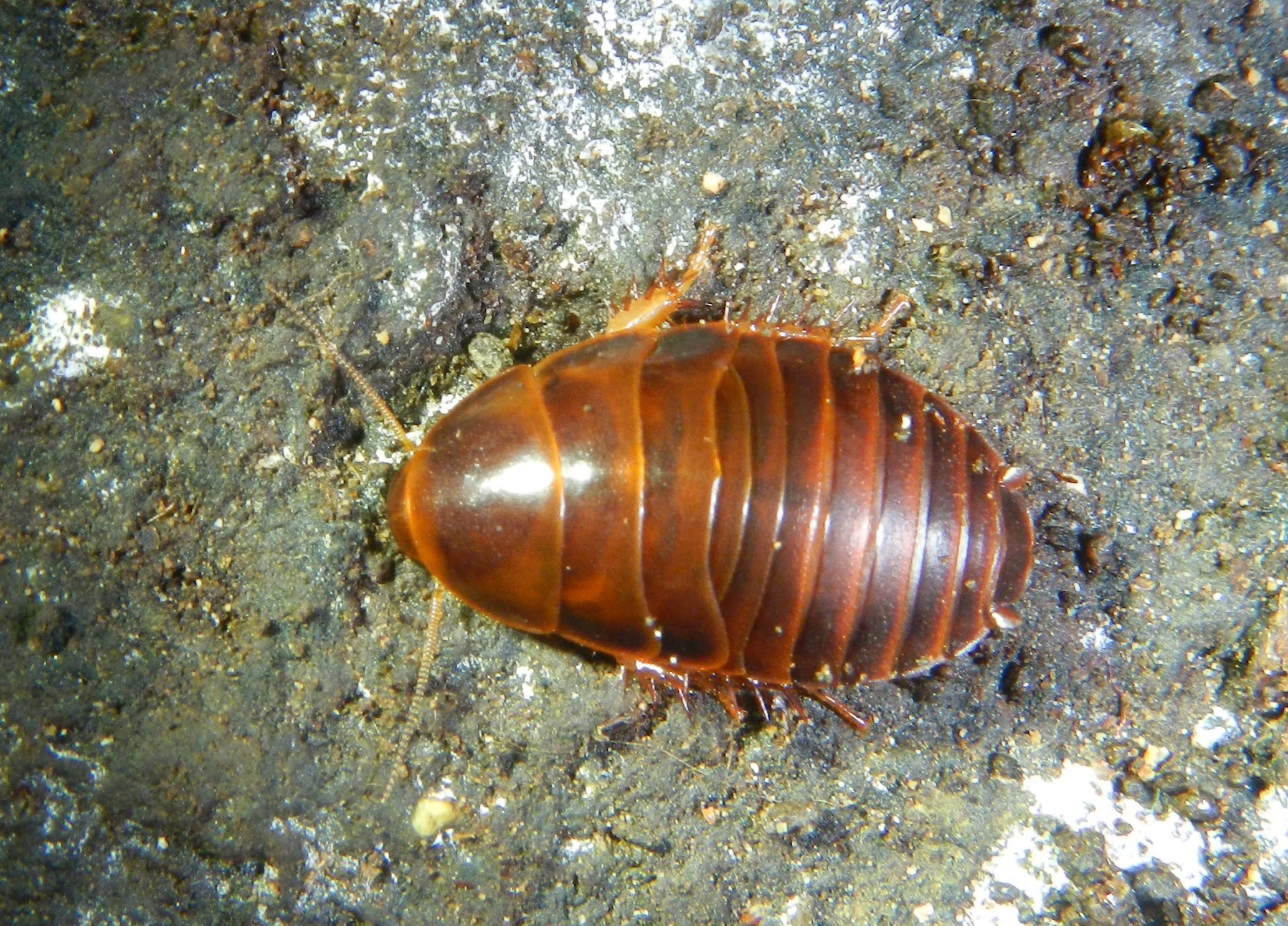

Scientific classification
- Kingdom: Animalia
- Phylum: Arthropoda
- Clade: Pancrustacea
- Class: Insecta
- Order: Blattodea
- Family: Blaberidae
- Genus: Pycnoscelus
- Species: P. striatus

Binomial name
- Pycnoscelus striatus (Kirby, 1903)

Synonyms
- Leucophaea striata Kirby, 1903; Pycnoscelus striata (Kirby, 1903)

= Pycnoscelus striatus =

Species of cockroach

Pycnoscelus striatus is a species of burrowing cockroach. It is closely related to the common plant pest Pycnoscelus surinamensis which has spread to tropical and subtropical regions across the world.

== Description ==
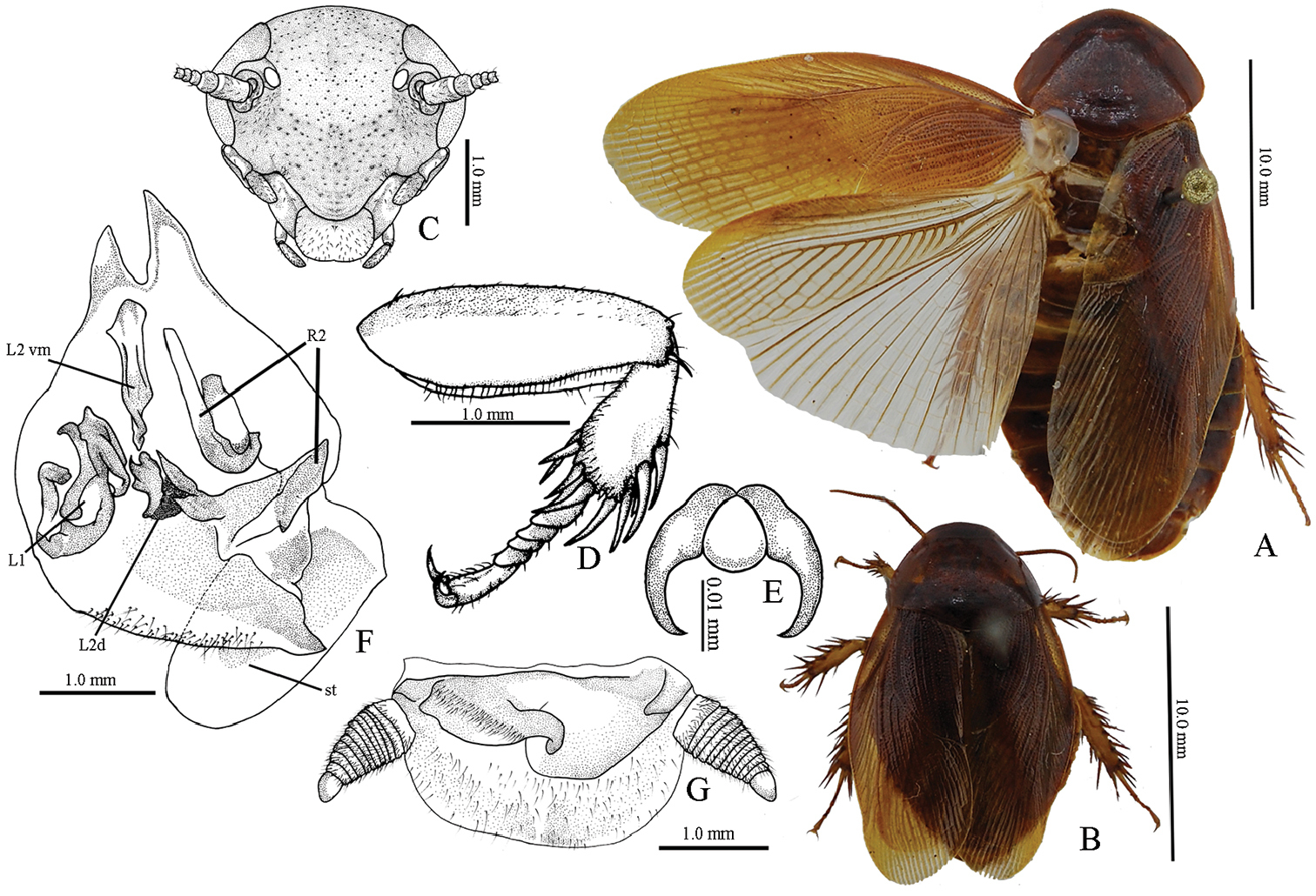
Anatomy and adults of both sexes (from Lucañas (2010)

Adult females are around 21 mm (0.83 in) in length, and have dark brown to black bodies with shiny paler brown wings which are variable in length. Males are around 14 mm (0.55 in), i.e. often less than half the size of females, with comparatively longer wings completely covering the abdomen.

In the original description by Kirby (1903, p.378), he noted the prosoma had a "front transversely striated", hence the species epithet (from the Latin striatus for its striated (i.e. lined) appearance, but which also can imply grooved or furrowed).

== Range ==
Pycnoscelus striatus originated in the Indomalayan region and is endemic to at least Indonesia (Sumatra, Kalimantan), Malaysia (Peninsular Malaysia), and the Philippines

== Habitat ==
Pycnoscelus striatus is a burrowing cockroach, commonly digging in loose debris such as guano in caves, where they can reach a high density. It is found not to be displaced by the American cockroach.
