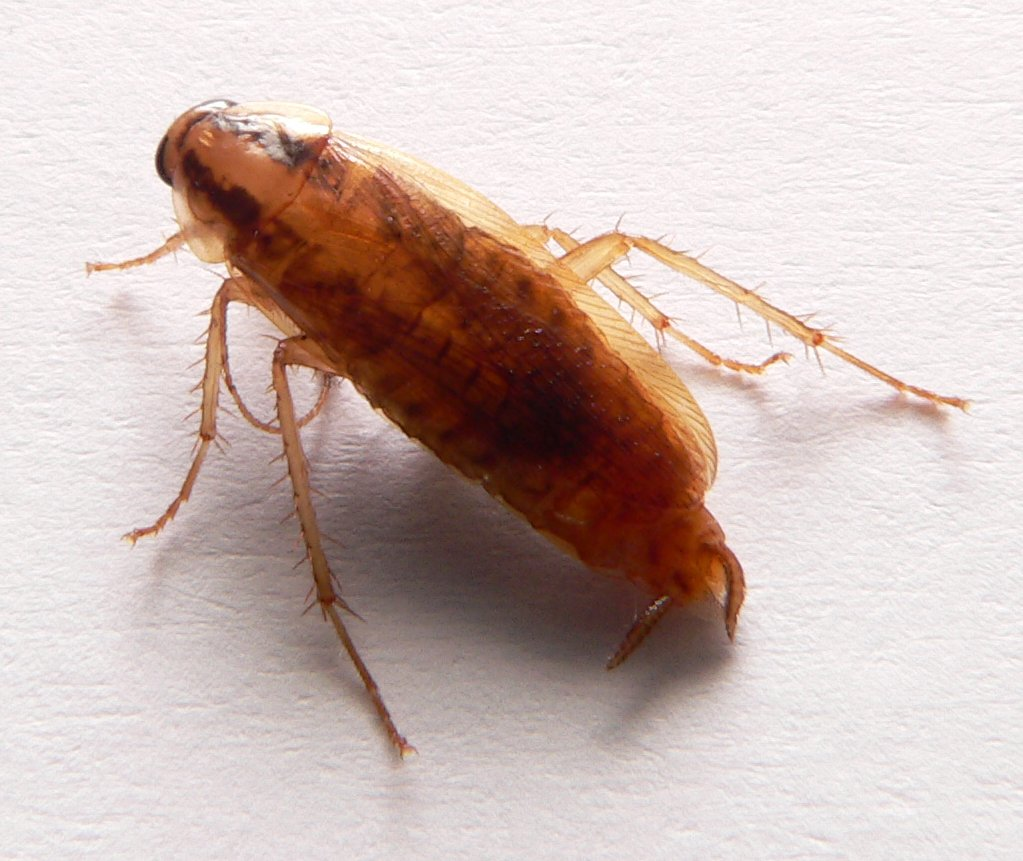
- Blatella germanica

Scientific classification
- Kingdom: Animalia
- Phylum: Arthropoda
- Clade: Pancrustacea
- Class: Insecta
- Order: Blattodea
- Family: Ectobiidae
- Subfamily: Blattellinae
- Genus: Blattella; Caudell, 1903

= Blattella =

Genus of cockroaches

Blattella is a genus of cosmopolitan and wild cockroaches in the family Ectobiidae.

== Species ==
The Catalogue of Life lists the following:

- Blattella aegrota
- Blattella armata
- Blattella asahinai
- Blattella barthi
- Blattella belli
- Blattella biligata
- Blattella bioculata
- Blattella bisignata
- Blattella brevicauda
- Blattella campbelli
- Blattella cavernicola
- Blattella chadwicki
- Blattella confusa
- Blattella coveri
- Blattella dethieri
- Blattella ednae
- Blattella eisneri
- Blattella fiski
- Blattella filibena companiyata
- Blattella formosana
- Blattella germanica
- Blattella guineensis
- Blattella humbertiana
- Blattella inexpectata
- Blattella interlineata
- Blattella karnyi
- Blattella kevani
- Blattella lamotteana
- Blattella lecarmata
- Blattella lecordieri
- Blattella lindbergi
- Blattella lituricollis
- Blattella lobiventris
- Blattella longstaffi
- Blattella meridionalis
- Blattella nipponica
- Blattella padmanabhani
- Blattella parenthesis
- Blattella parvula
- Blattella portalensis
- Blattella punctifrons
- Blattella radicifera
- Blattella richardsi
- Blattella roederi
- Blattella rossi
- Blattella sauteri
- Blattella simillima
- Blattella sordida
- Blattella subvittata
- Blattella teressensis
- Blattella vaga
- Blattella whartoni
- Blattella vrijdaghi
