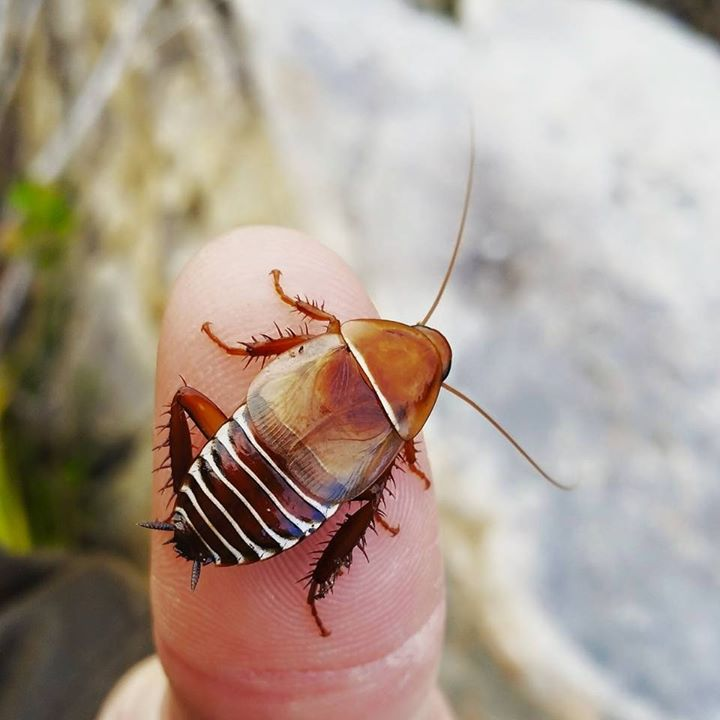
- Temnopteryx phalerata

Scientific classification
- Kingdom: Animalia
- Phylum: Arthropoda
- Clade: Pancrustacea
- Class: Insecta
- Order: Blattodea
- Family: Ectobiidae
- Subfamily: Blattellinae
- Genus: Temnopteryx; Brunner von Wattenwyl, 1865

Species
- Temnopteryx phalerata

= Temnopteryx (cockroach) =

Genus of cockroaches

Temnopteryx is a genus of cockroaches. The genus includes Temnopteryx phalerata, the Cape Zebra Cockroach, which is endemic to the Fynbos biome of the Western Cape province of South Africa.
