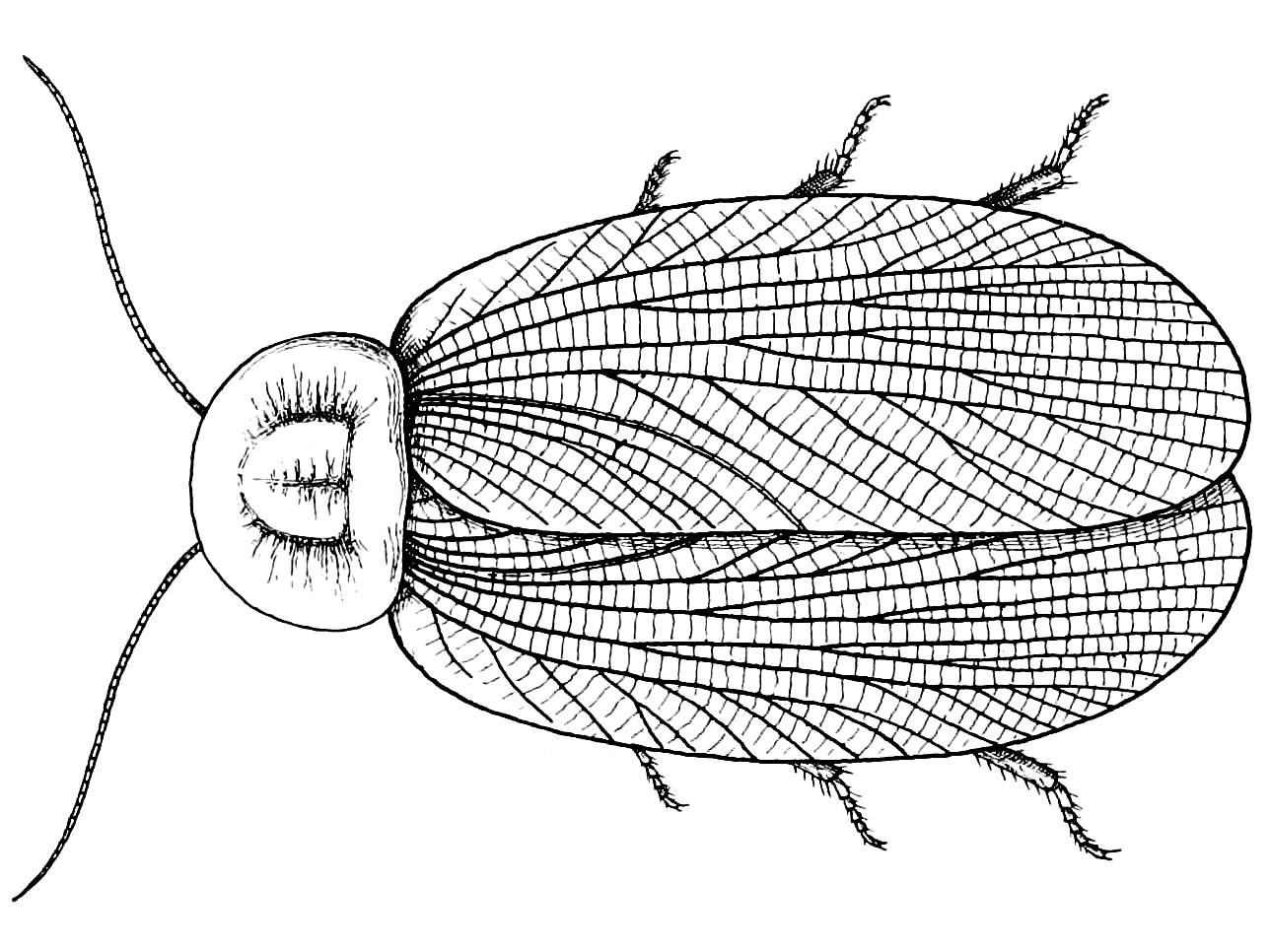
- A. johnsoni

Scientific classification
- Kingdom: Animalia
- Phylum: Arthropoda
- Clade: Pancrustacea
- Class: Insecta
- Order: †Blattoptera
- Family: †Archimylacridae
- Subfamily: †Archimylacrinae
- Genus: †Aphthoroblattina; Handlirsch, 1906

Species
- A. carbonis; A. fascigera; A. handlirschi; A. irregularis; A. johnsoni; A. sulcata

= Aphthoroblattina =

Aphthoroblattina Temporal range: Pennsylvanian

Extinct genus of cockroaches

Apthoroblattina is an extinct genus of primitive cockroaches from the Carboniferous period. Fossils of the genus have been found in England, Wales, the United States, and Russia. The paratype specimen for the species A. johnsoni is recorded to have a total length of 43 mm (1.7 in) and a width of 38 mm (1.5 in), while the type specimen of A. sulcata is noted to have been up to 45 mm (1.8 in) in length and 25 mm (0.98 in) in width if complete.
