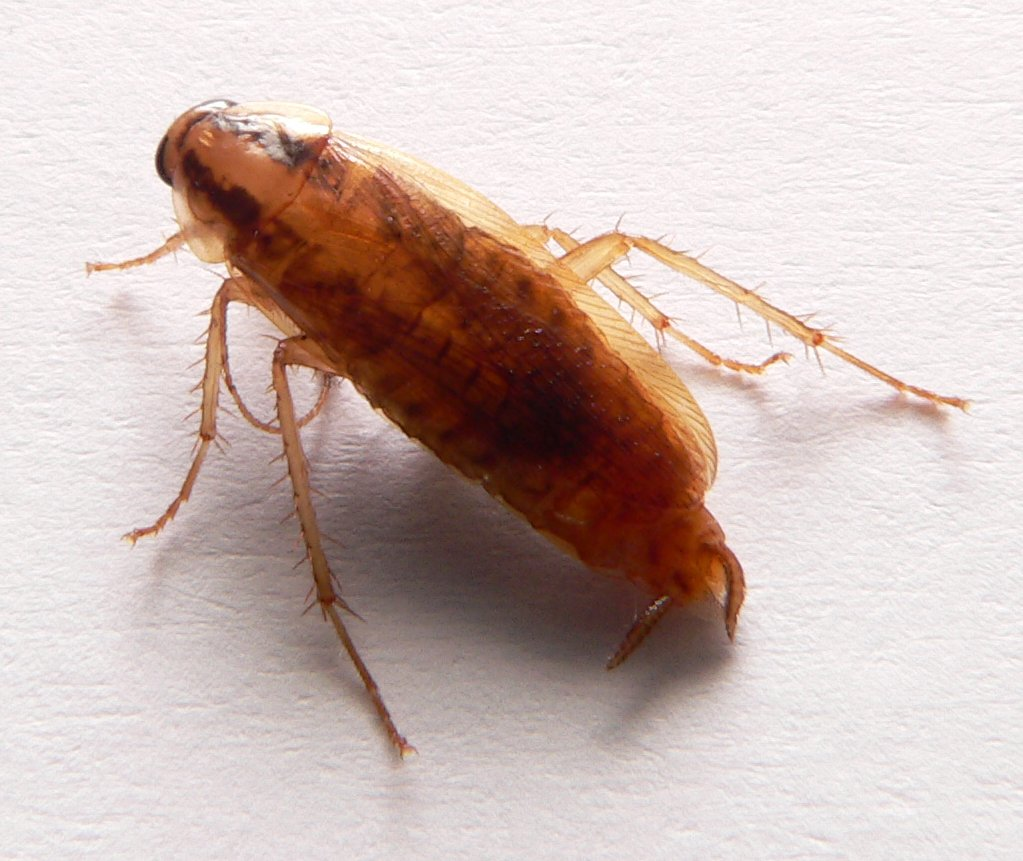
- Blattella germanica

Scientific classification
- Kingdom: Animalia
- Phylum: Arthropoda
- Clade: Pancrustacea
- Class: Insecta
- Order: Blattodea
- Family: Ectobiidae
- Subfamily: Blattellinae

Genera
- ~70; see text

= Blattellinae =

Subfamily of cockroaches

Blattellinae is a subfamily of the wood cockroach family, Ectobiidae (formerly "Blattellidae"). It includes the global household pest Blattella germanica, the German cockroach, and a number of endangered species. It contains about 70 genera.

== Genera ==
- Attaphila Wheeler, 1900
- Blattella Caudell, 1903
- Hololeptoblatta Bolívar, 1924 – endangered spp.
- Ischnoptera Burmeister, 1838
- Loboptera Brunner von Wattenwyl, 1865
- Lobopterella Princis, 1957
- Miriamrothschildia Roth, 1989 – endangered spp.
- Neotemnopteryx Princis, 1951
- Parcoblatta Shellford, 1911
- Pseudomops Serville, 1831
- Saltoblattella Bohn, 2009 - monotypic Saltoblattella montistabularis
- Symploce Hebard, 1916
- Temnopteryx Brunner von Wattenwyl, 1865
- Other genera:

Agmoblatta – Akaniblatta – Alsteinia – Anallacta – Aneurinita – Anisopygia – Antitheton – Aphlebiella – Arublatta – Aruistra – Aseucina – Astylella – Astyloblatta – Beybienkoa – Blattellina – Caboverdea – Caffroblatta – Cahita – Calhypnorna – Caloblatta – Carbrunneria – Ceratinoptera – Ceuthobia – Ceuthobiella – Chorisia – Chrastoblatta – Chromatonotus – Compsosilpha – Dasyblatta – Desmosia – Dewittea – Dictyoblattella – Dipteretrum – Distichopis – Disymploce – Dyakina – Dyakinodes – Eowilsonia – Episymploce – Escala – Euandroblatta – Eublattella – Eudromiella – Euhanitschia – Euhebardula – Euhypnorna – Eulissosoma – Euloboptera – Eurylestes – Franwalkeria – Gislenia – Hanitschella – Hanitschia – Haplosymploce – Helgaia – Hemipterisca – Hemithyrsocera – Hensaussurea – Hoplophoropyga – Hypnorna – Hypnornoides – Ignabolivaria – Incoblatta – Isoldaia – Jacobsonina – Johnrehnia – Jotepperia – Keyella – Leptothyrsocera – Litoblatta – Lobodromia – Lobopteromorpha – Lophometopum – Macrophyllodromia – Mallotoblatta – Maretina – Maretiola – Mayottella – Megamare – Microblatta – Molestella – Moluchia – Namablatta – Nelipophygus – Neoleptoblatta – Neoloboptera – Nesomylachris – Nimbablatta – Nondewittea – Nothoblatta – Nymphodromia – Onycholobus – Operculea – Ornatiblatta – Pachneblatta – Papuablatta – Paraectoneura – Parajacobsonina – Paraloboptera – Parascalida – Parasigmoidella – Parasymploce – Paratemnopteryx – Parellipsidion – Pholeosilpha – Phymatosilpha – Pseudectobia – Pseudoanaplectinia – Pseudoceratinoptera – Pseudosigmella – Pseudosymploce – Pseudothyrsocera – Rhytidometopum – Richanitschia – Robshelfordia – Rudebeckia – Scalida – Sciablatta – Shawella – Sigmella – Sinablatta – Sliferia – Squamoptera – Stayella – Symplocodes – Tairella – Tartaroblatta – Termitoblatta – Trogloblattella – Xestoblatta – Xosablatta – Xosaia – †Piniblattella
