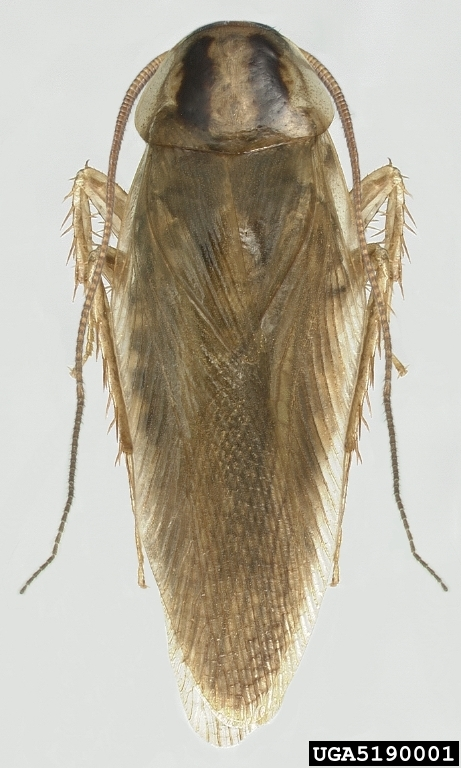
- Adult

Scientific classification
- Kingdom: Animalia
- Phylum: Arthropoda
- Clade: Pancrustacea
- Class: Insecta
- Order: Blattodea
- Family: Ectobiidae
- Genus: Blattella
- Species: B. asahinai

Binomial name
- Blattella asahinai Mizukubo, 1981

= Blattella asahinai =

Asian cockroach

Species of cockroach

Blattella asahinai, the Asian cockroach, is a species of cockroach that was first described in 1981 from insects collected on Okinawa Island, Japan. It is a small species of cockroach, typically 1.3 to 1.6 centimetres (1/2 to 5/8 in) long and tan to dark brown in colour with dark parallel stripes on the back of their heads. It is commonly mistaken for the German cockroach (B. germanica) due to their similar appearance. It is now commonly found in the United States in and around houses.

== Characteristics and appearance ==
The Asian cockroach is nearly identical to the German cockroach (B. germanica) except for a few minor morphological differences. Like the German cockroach, it is about 1.6 cm (5/8 in) long, is tan to brown in color, and has wings. However, its wings are longer than the German cockroach, and a difference is seen in a groove in the abdomen in the two species. The quickest way to tell the difference between them is that the Asian is a strong flyer and is attracted to light, unlike the German. This species tends to prefer the outdoors, whereas the German prefers living indoors. The almost identical appearance has caused concerns and issues with the pest management industries when determining the strategies of pest control, as pesticides for the German are not always effective for the Asian. To differentiate between the two cockroaches with the naked eye, there are noticeable parts of each cockroach. The ventral surface of the left mandible, the vein coloration of the right tegmen, the wing size and venation as well as the setal marginal bristles on the cerci are the slight morphological differences between the Asian and German.

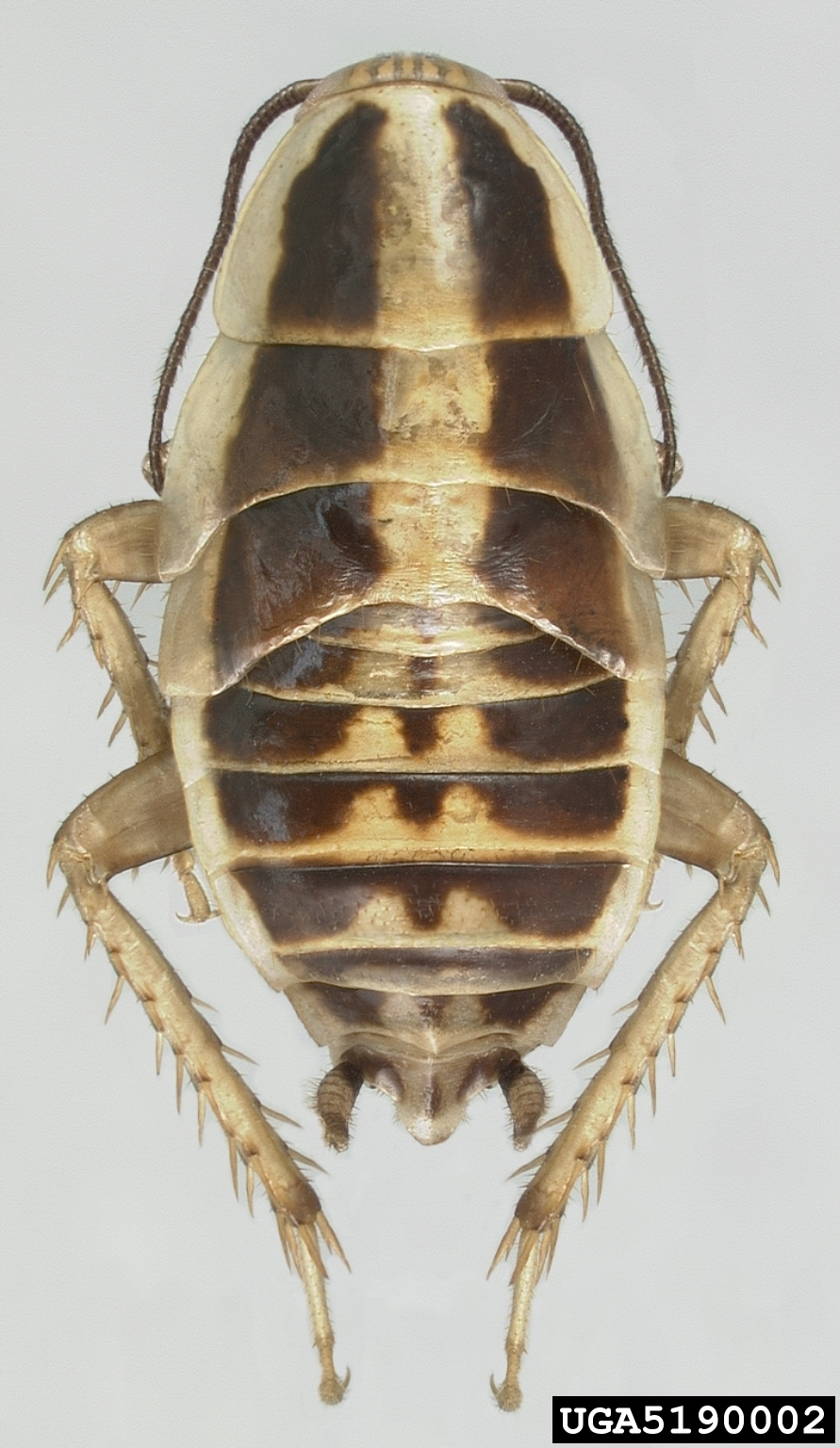
Nymph

== History and distribution ==
The Asian cockroach is so similar to the German cockroach that it was only recognized as a distinct species in 1981 by Dr. Takayuki Mizukubo, from the National Institute of Agro-Environmental Sciences, Japan. Recent genetic analyses indicate that B. germanica only diverged from B. asahinai slightly over 2000 years ago, presumed to be the point at which the German cockroach spread to areas where it was no longer in contact with B. asahinai.

The first reported appearance of the Asian cockroach in the United States was in 1986 in Lakeland, Florida but at first it was believed to be the German species. It is believed that the Asian came to Florida through the import of goods from Japan. On March 3, 1986, Dr Louis M. Roth received cockroaches of Lakeland, Florida from Dr Philip G. Koehler of Florida Extension Services of the University of Florida for inspection. It was noted that a pest control worker referred to them as "German cockroaches" but they could fly readily and were common outdoors. The only two species of Blattella present in the United States were the field cockroach (B. vaga) and the German. Roth was unaware of the Asian species but discovered it and sent several Lakeland specimens to Dr. Mizukubo and he concluded they were B. asahinai.

Further testing was implemented by the Center for Urban and Structural Entomology at Texas A&M University in September 2007 where they tested the two species through an ethological, morphological and genetic approach in order to confirm the presence of the Asian cockroach in Harris County, Texas. Evaluations of DNA gene sequences showed similarities to the German. It was found that environmental factors play a significant role in differentiating the two species although there are slight morphological differences. It was confirmed that Asian Cockroaches were discovered in Harris County, Texas in May 2006 around the Barker Reservoir, in both urban and undeveloped areas. These cockroaches were later also found in the Hunter's Creek subdivision in greater Houston. The Asian cockroach has since expanded throughout much of Florida and is spreading into other southern states. In addition to Florida, it is reported in Alabama, Georgia, South Carolina, and Texas. In Dothan, Alabama in 2003, there were several reports that stated there were "flying German cockroaches" from Alabama Cooperative Extension System agents, where specimens were obtained for identification. Using a male specimen and comparing it to the description of Dr. Mizukubo and Dr. Roth, they confirmed that the specimens were in fact Asians.

== Habitat and behaviour ==
Asian cockroaches are predominantly found outdoors in shaded mulched, composted areas where fresh plant litter accumulates as well as in damp areas. Large areas of grass or leaf litter are what the Asian cockroach gravitates towards. When the Asian cockroach is happy with the chosen location, they are the dominant cockroach and take over the location where they tend to form hordes of 30,000 to 250,000 cockroaches per acre (74,000 to 618,000/ha). Its population reaches its zenith in late August and declines rapidly with the onset of cool weather. Asian cockroaches are the most active at dusk and are attracted to light-coloured surfaces and bright lights. This means at dusk, the Asian cockroach may fly towards the home and enter through open doors and windows but indoor invasions occur rarely. While other cockroaches carry diseases and bacterium, as of today, research has not suggested that the Asian cockroach carries any pathogens or diseases. However, they do come into contact with other bacteria due to their habitat preferences being around homes with outdoor pathogens, animal feces, and fungi.

=== Mulch preferences ===
Leaf litter of all kinds is where the Asian cockroach is most commonly found. In the Southern states of America, typical mulch types include cypress, oak leaf litter, pine, rubber, and topsoil. As leaf litter is used as domestic mulching for general purpose landscaping, using this type of mulch can affect how dense indoor populations of the Asian cockroach can be. They are predominantly a nocturnal species of cockroach, although they live and breed outdoors, they are attracted to light sources and will find their way into buildings. These can include homes, office buildings, and restaurants. The Asian cockroach stays clear of topsoil and rubber mulch and has very little interaction with cypress mulch. During adverse weather conditions such as cold weather or dry conditions, the Asian cockroach burrows down into the leaf litter.

== Diet ==
Asian cockroaches are omnivorous, as are most cockroach species : they will eat anything they can find. They have been observed to eat human food, pet food, flowers and agricultural crops, as well as prey such as lepidopteran eggs in soybean and cotton crops. They have also been sighted feeding on lettuce, cabbage, and strawberries.

== German cockroach comparison ==
The Asian cockroach is the presumed ancestor of the German cockroach, the predominant cockroach pest in America and some parts of the world.

=== Behaviour ===
The Asian cockroach has longer but narrower wings than the German cockroach. It can be observed flying, predominantly its preferred choice of movement especially when disturbed, and to move around compared with the German cockroach, which can be rarely seen flying, merely fluttering its wings ineffectively. The other main difference between the two species is its reaction to light sources; the Asian cockroach is naturally attracted to light, whereas the German cockroach scatters away in the presence of bright light.

=== Reproduction and life cycle ===
Asian cockroaches and field cockroaches are similar ecologically in comparison to the German cockroach due to both these species breeding outdoors. Both the female Asian and German cockroach carry their egg capsules (oothecae) with them until the eggs hatch but female Asian cockroaches produces fewer oothecae in comparison to the German cockroach, producing approximately four oothecae in their lifetime, each averaging 35 - 40 eggs. Asian Cockroaches have longer initial and subsequent pre-oviposition periods than its German counterpart, and their eggs require slightly longer time to hatch. Asian adult females produce their first egg ootheca approximately 13 days after becoming an adult, and the period from when the ootheca first appeared to hatching is approximately 19 days. The female German cockroach can produce an Ootheca after approximately 8 days after becoming an adult with an incubation period of approximately 17 days. The oothecae of the Asian cockroach appears slightly smaller than that of the German cockroach as well as once hatched, the Asian cockroach is notably smaller than the German cockroach at the time of its first instar. The Asian cockroach is most fertile from February to May as well as in August through to September.

Shortly after hatching, nymph cockroaches turn from white to brown and their skin hardens. Asian cockroach females requires 60 - 70 days to become an adult, slightly longer than the males. The lifetime of male and female Asian Cockroaches are approximately 50 and 100 days respectively, compared with the German cockroach which lives on average 130 for males and 150 days for females.

An occasion where an Asian and a German mate with one another is extremely rare due to the behavioural differences of the two species but this can occur. On the rare occasion they produce viable offspring, it has the ability to fly and inherits the insecticide resistance the German possesses.

== Beneficial insect ==
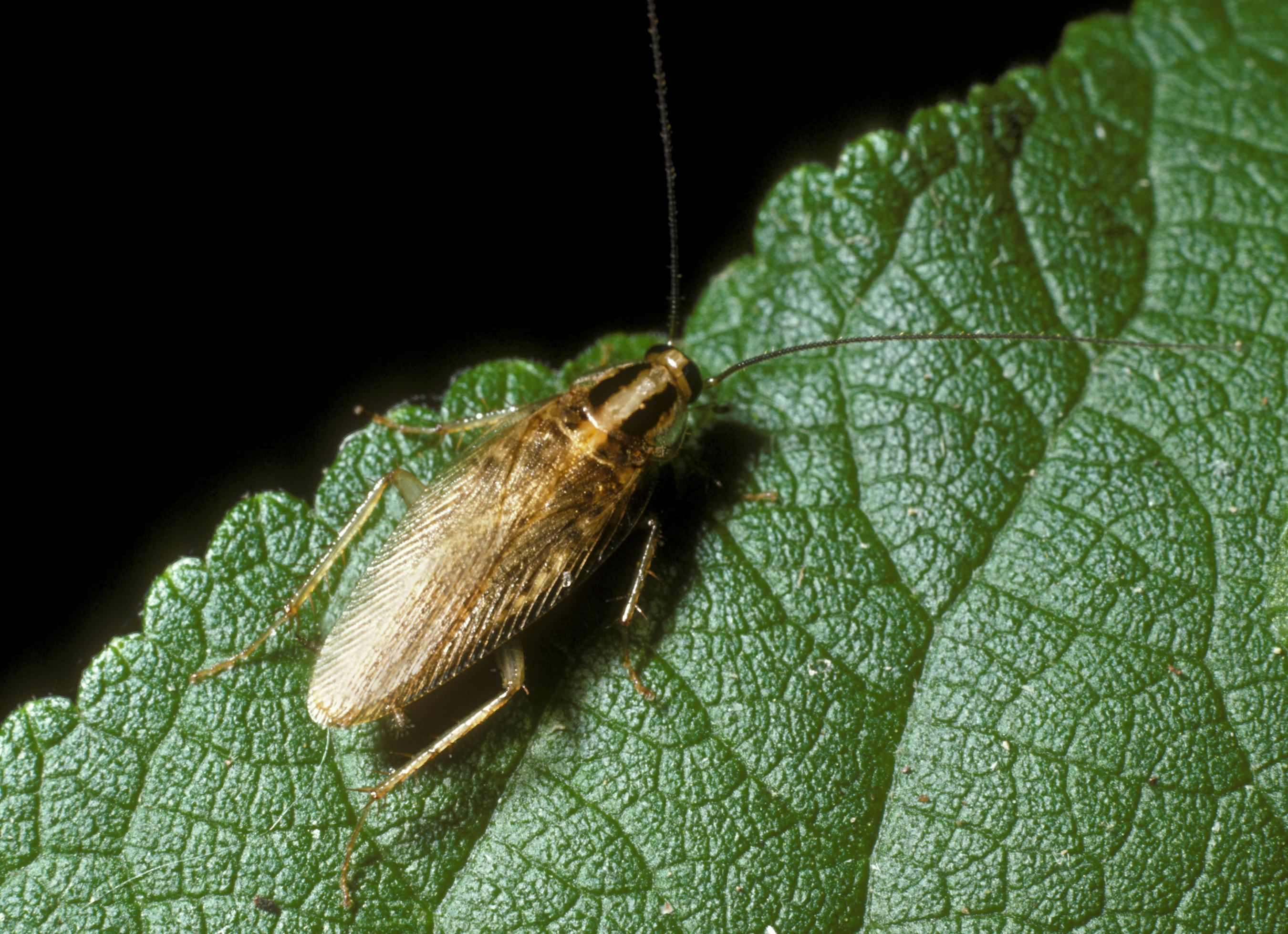
Soybean leaf

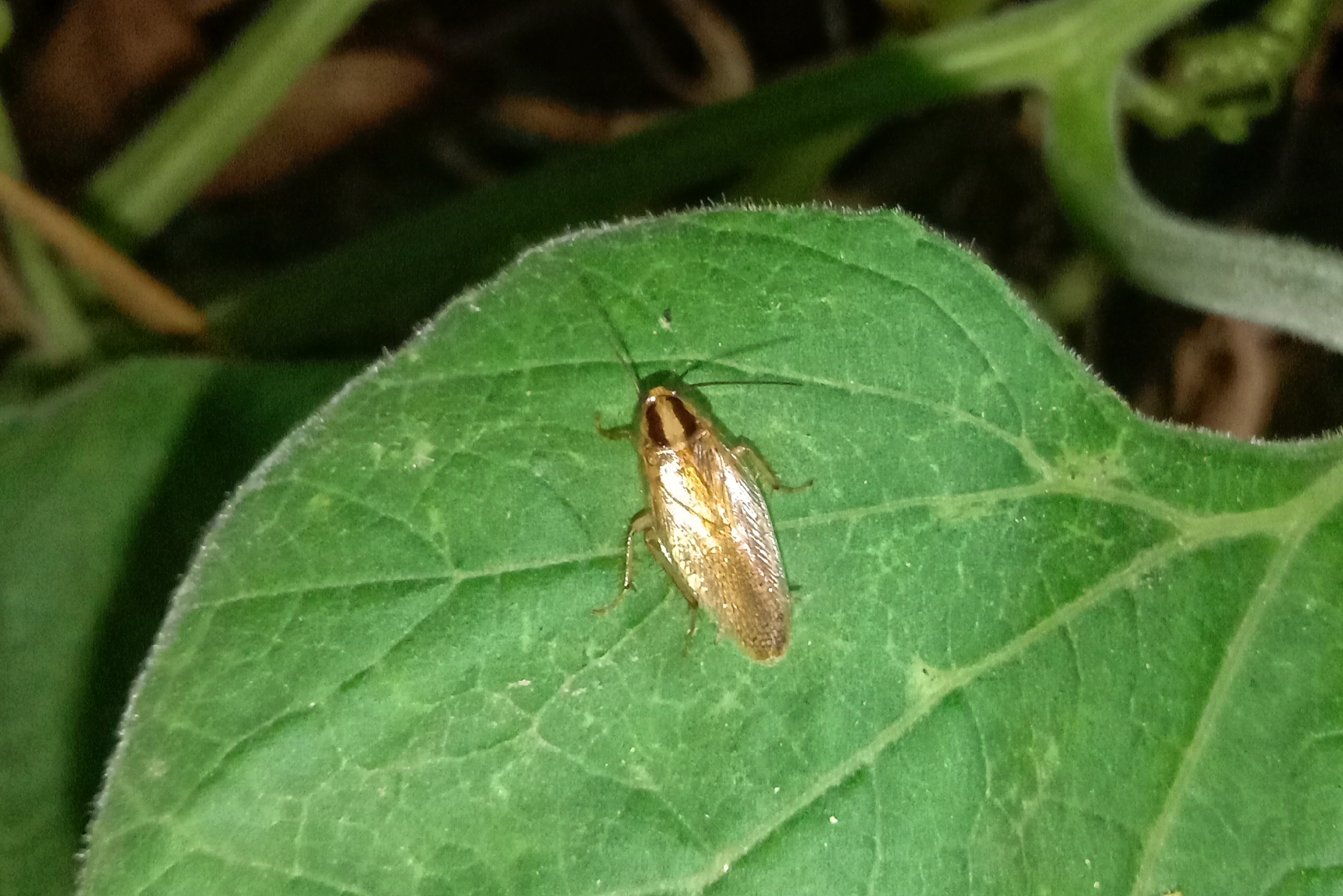
Calabash leaf

In 2006, entomologist Robert Pfannenstiel conducted research on the ecology of predators of crop pests in Texas, in particular the Asian cockroach. Asian cockroaches ventured west into Texas in 2006, and became the most common predator of bollworm eggs in the state's Rio Grande Valley region. The bollworm threatens cotton, soybean, maize, and tomato crops. Helicoverpa zea (Boddie) and Spodoptera exigua (Hubner) are leading pests of soybean crops in Southern Texas. Their eggs were placed on the leaves of soybean crops, without pesticides, and were observed in 3-hour increments over 24 hours to observe both the night and day behaviour of predators towards the pests of the crops. From 2001 to 2005 similar tests were conducted on the predation of Lepidopteran eggs but no observations of the Asian cockroach were made. In 2006, nymph and adult Asian cockroaches were observed feeding on H. zea and S. exigua from both the canopy and leaf litter of the crops and made up 53.7% of all predators feeding on the eggs.

== Pest status ==
The Asian cockroach is a foreign pest with a peak in adult population during summer and spring in Florida. It lives in the garden where it is in contact with animal feces, soil-borne pathogens and other disease-causing microorganisms. The German cockroach has feces and body parts that can possibly be allergenic to humans and the Asian cockroach may possess similar traits and pose the same health issue to these individuals.

== Control and management ==
Although the Asian cockroach prefers the outdoors as its habitat, they are often drawn to houses due to light sources. Restaurants have implemented control measures such as Integrated Pest Management programs (IPM) which target the German cockroach. Due to the similarities to the German and if proper identification is not made of the Asian species, restaurants and homeowners may use pesticide treatments that are ineffective against the Asian, exposing the individuals to unnecessary pesticide residues and other control measures. Indoor cockroach insecticides are generally ineffective in killing the Asian and will only control the ones that have entered the house but are difficult to contain once penetrating a location. They are fast and nimble, and are difficult to kill on the spot. In order to control and manage the Asian, garden or outdoor area maintenance of homes – including removal of excess mulch and plant debris – is an effective approach to reduce population.

Preventative measures for insects including sealing cracks or crevices in the floor or walls are unnecessary for Asian cockroaches as they can fly into buildings through open windows or doors anyway. The use of outdoor insecticides offers another option to Asian cockroach management. ß-cyfluthrin and fipronil granules are insecticides that are highly toxic to the Asian cockroach taking on average 20 minutes and 11 hours respectively to kill the cockroach compared to a MotherEarth Exempt Concentrate natural essential oil which can take up to 11.45 days to kill the cockroach. Scatter baits have been purposely developed for the control of the Asian cockroach and have proven to be effective whereas indoor applications of insecticides have proven to be ineffective.
