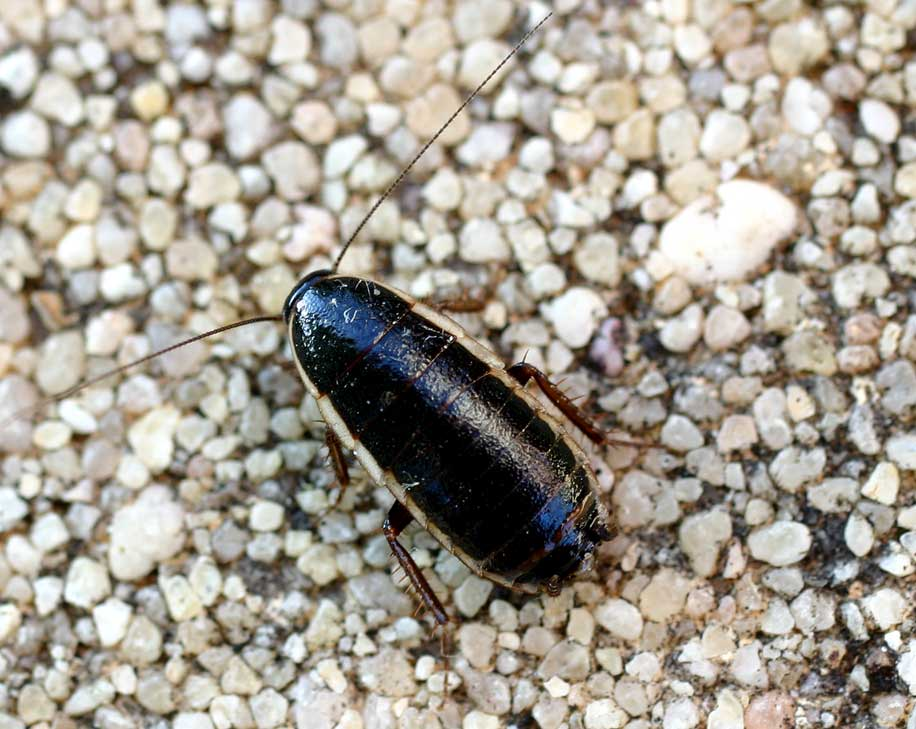
- Loboptera decipiens

Scientific classification
- Kingdom: Animalia
- Phylum: Arthropoda
- Clade: Pancrustacea
- Class: Insecta
- Order: Blattodea
- Family: Ectobiidae
- Subfamily: Blattellinae
- Genus: Loboptera; Brunner von Wattenwyl, 1865

= Loboptera =

Genus of cockroaches

External image
- Images at iNaturalist

Loboptera is a genus of mostly Palaearctic cockroaches erected by Carl Brunner von Wattenwyl in 1865; it appears to be currently placed in the subfamily Blattellinae. The recorded distribution (probably incomplete) for species includes: mainland Europe (not the British Isles or Scandinavia), North Africa, Cameroun, the Middle East through to central Asia.

== Species ==
The Cockroach Species File lists:

1. Loboptera alluaudi Chopard, 1936
2. Loboptera anagae Martin & Oromi, 1987
3. Loboptera andalusica Bohn, 1990
4. Loboptera angulata Chopard, 1943
5. Loboptera barbarae Bohn, 1990
6. Loboptera canariensis Chopard, 1954
7. Loboptera cavernicola Martin & Oromi, 1987
8. Loboptera chioensis Martin & Izquierdo, 1999
9. Loboptera cryptofoveata Bohn, 1991
10. Loboptera cuneilobata Bohn, 1991
11. Loboptera decipiens (Germar, 1817) - type species as: Blatta decipiens Germar (= L. decipiens decipiens one of 2 subspecies)
12. Loboptera delafrontera Bohn, 1990
13. Loboptera fortunata Krauss, 1892
14. Loboptera foveolata Bohn, 1991
15. Loboptera glandulifera Bohn, 1991
16. Loboptera hispanica Harz, 1975
17. Loboptera irregularis Chopard, 1943
18. Loboptera isolata Grandcolas, 1994
19. Loboptera jensi Bohn, 1990
20. Loboptera juergeni Bohn, 1990
21. Loboptera lagunensis Martin & Izquierdo, 1999
22. Loboptera loboptera (Princis, 1962)
23. Loboptera maroccana Bolívar, 1894
24. Loboptera minor Bolívar, 1894
25. Loboptera ombriosa Martin & Izquierdo, 1987
26. Loboptera ovolobata Bohn, 1991
27. Loboptera penirobusta Martin & Izquierdo, 1999
28. Loboptera subterranea Martin & Oromi, 1987
29. Loboptera teneguia Izquierdo & Martin, 1999
30. Loboptera tenoensis Izquierdo & Martin, 1999
31. Loboptera troglobia Izquierdo & Martin, 1987
32. Loboptera truncata Chopard, 1936
