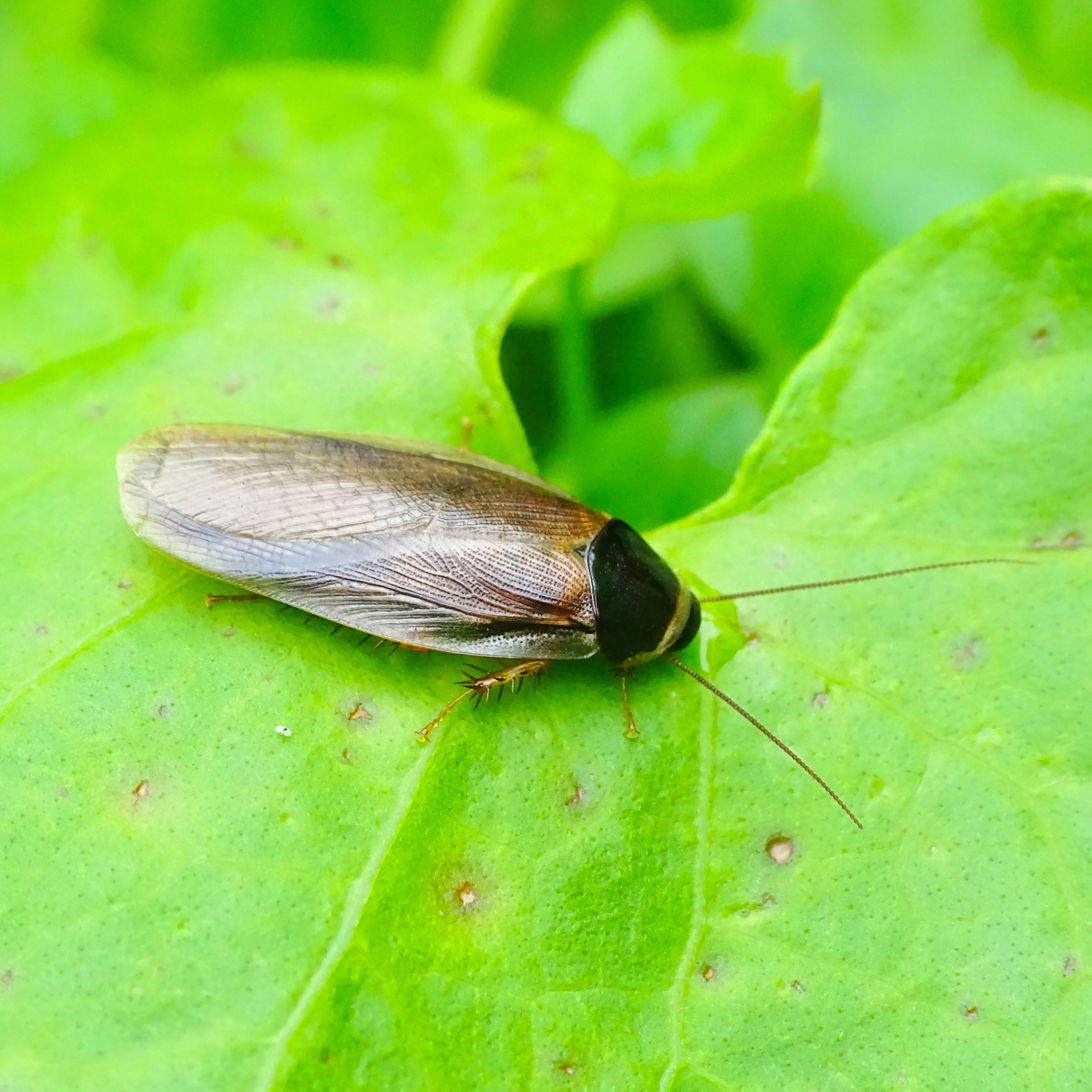
- Pycnoscelus indicus

Scientific classification
- Kingdom: Animalia
- Phylum: Arthropoda
- Clade: Pancrustacea
- Class: Insecta
- Order: Blattodea
- Family: Blaberidae
- Subfamily: Pycnoscelinae
- Genus: Pycnoscelus; Scudder, 1862

= Pycnoscelus =

Genus of cockroaches

Pycnoscelus is a genus of cockroaches in the family Blaberidae. Species in the genus Pycnoscelus are recorded from India, China and SE Asia.

== Species ==
The Cockroach species file records for genus Pycnoscelus:

1. Pycnoscelus aurantius Hanitsch, 1935
2. Pycnoscelus confertus (Walker, 1869)
3. Pycnoscelus femapterus Roth, 1998
4. Pycnoscelus gorochovi Anisyutkin, 2002
5. Pycnoscelus indicus (Fabricius, 1775)
6. Pycnoscelus janetscheki Bey-Bienko, 1968
7. Pycnoscelus micropterus Hanitsch, 1931
8. Pycnoscelus niger (Brunner von Wattenwyl, 1865)
9. Pycnoscelus rothi Anisyutkin, 2002
10. Pycnoscelus rufus Bey-Bienko, 1950
11. Pycnoscelus schwendingeri Anisyutkin, 2018
12. Pycnoscelus semivitreus Princis, 1967
13. Pycnoscelus striatus (Kirby, 1903)
14. Pycnoscelus surinamensis (Linnaeus, 1758) - type species (Surinam cockroach)
15. Pycnoscelus tenebriger (Walker, 1868)
16. Pycnoscelus vietnamensis Anisyutkin, 2002
