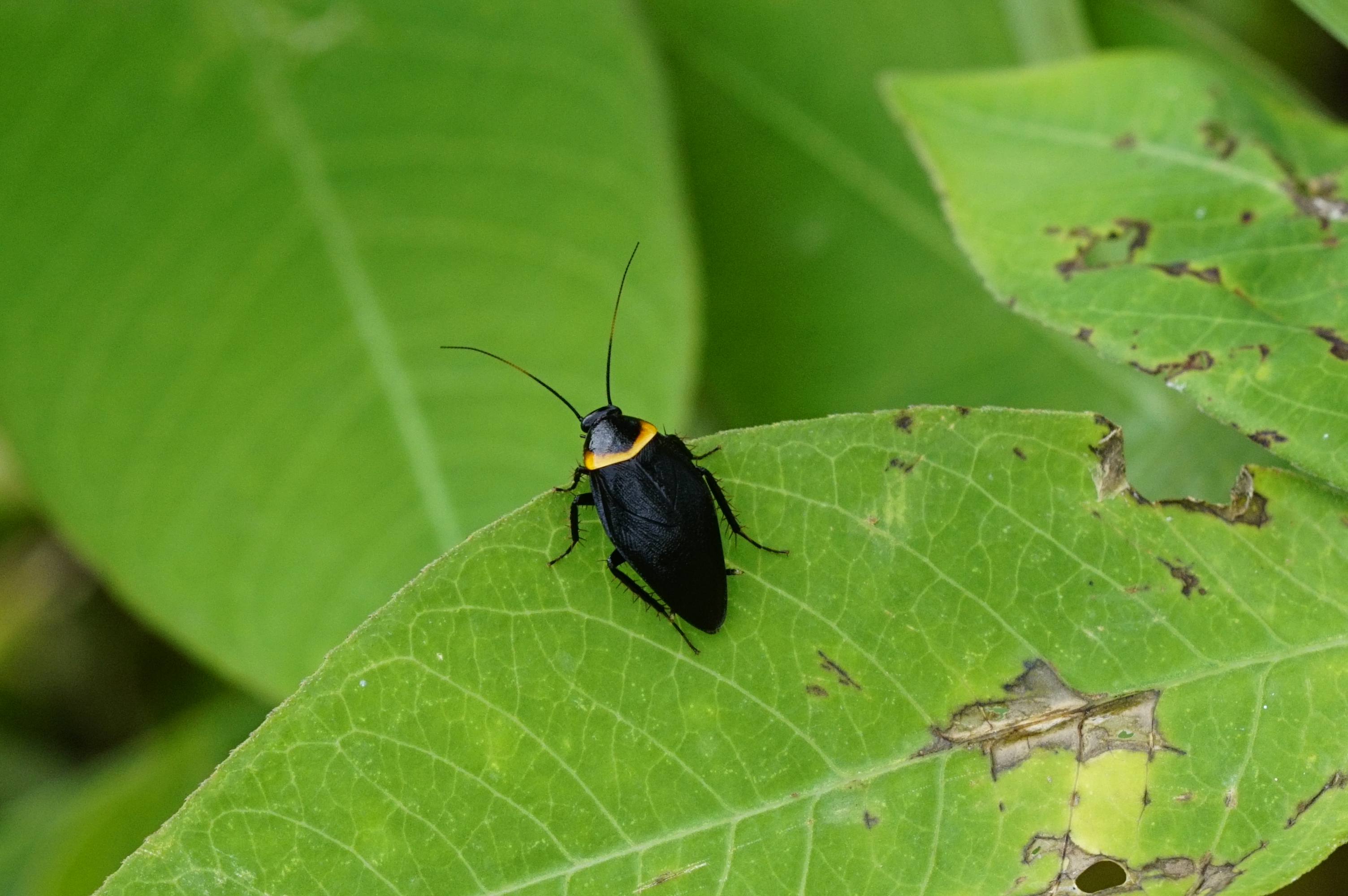
- Hemithyrsocera palliata

Scientific classification
- Kingdom: Animalia
- Phylum: Arthropoda
- Clade: Pancrustacea
- Class: Insecta
- Order: Blattodea
- Family: Ectobiidae
- Subfamily: Blattellinae
- Tribe: Hemithysocerini
- Genus: Hemithyrsocera; Saussure, 1893

Species
- Hemithyrsocera palliata

= Hemithyrsocera =

Genus of cockroach

Hemithyrsocera is a genus of cockroaches with 71 accepted species.
