= Pycnoscelus rothi =

Scientific classification
- Kingdom: Animalia
- Phylum: Arthropoda
- Clade: Pancrustacea
- Class: Insecta
- Order: Blattodea
- Family: Blaberidae
- Genus: Pycnoscelus
- Species: P. rothi

Binomial name
- Pycnoscelus rothi Anisyutkin, 2002

Species of cockroach

Pycnoscelus rothi is a species of cockroach in the genus Pycnoscelus, family Blaberidae.

== History ==
It was first identified by Anisyutkin in 2002.
