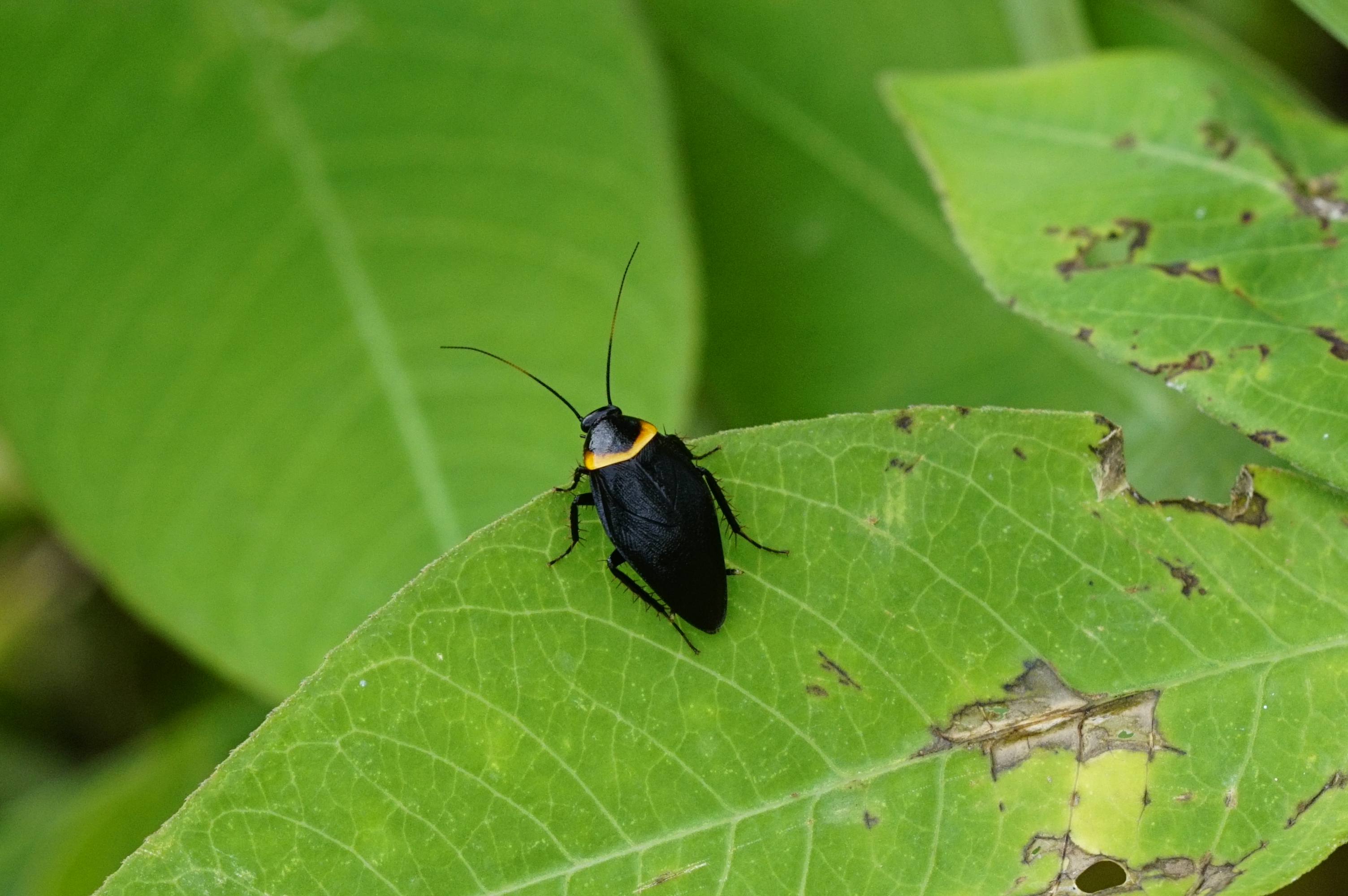
- Hemithyrsocera palliata

Scientific classification
- Kingdom: Animalia
- Phylum: Arthropoda
- Clade: Pancrustacea
- Class: Insecta
- Order: Blattodea
- Family: Ectobiidae
- Genus: Hemithyrsocera
- Species: H. palliata

Binomial name
- Hemithyrsocera palliata (Fabricius ,1798)

Synonyms
- Phyllodromia fuliginosa Brunner von Wattenwyl, 1893; Ectobia [sic] indica Saussure, 1869; Thyrsocera nigra Brunner von Wattenwyl, 1865; Ellipsidium subcinctum Walker, 1868

= Hemithyrsocera palliata =

Species of cockroach

Hemithyrsocera palliata is a species of cockroach endemic to the South Asia. It has a shining dark brown color and is about 12 mm (1/2 in) long. Its pronotum is sub-elliptical and is black with a golden yellow margin.
