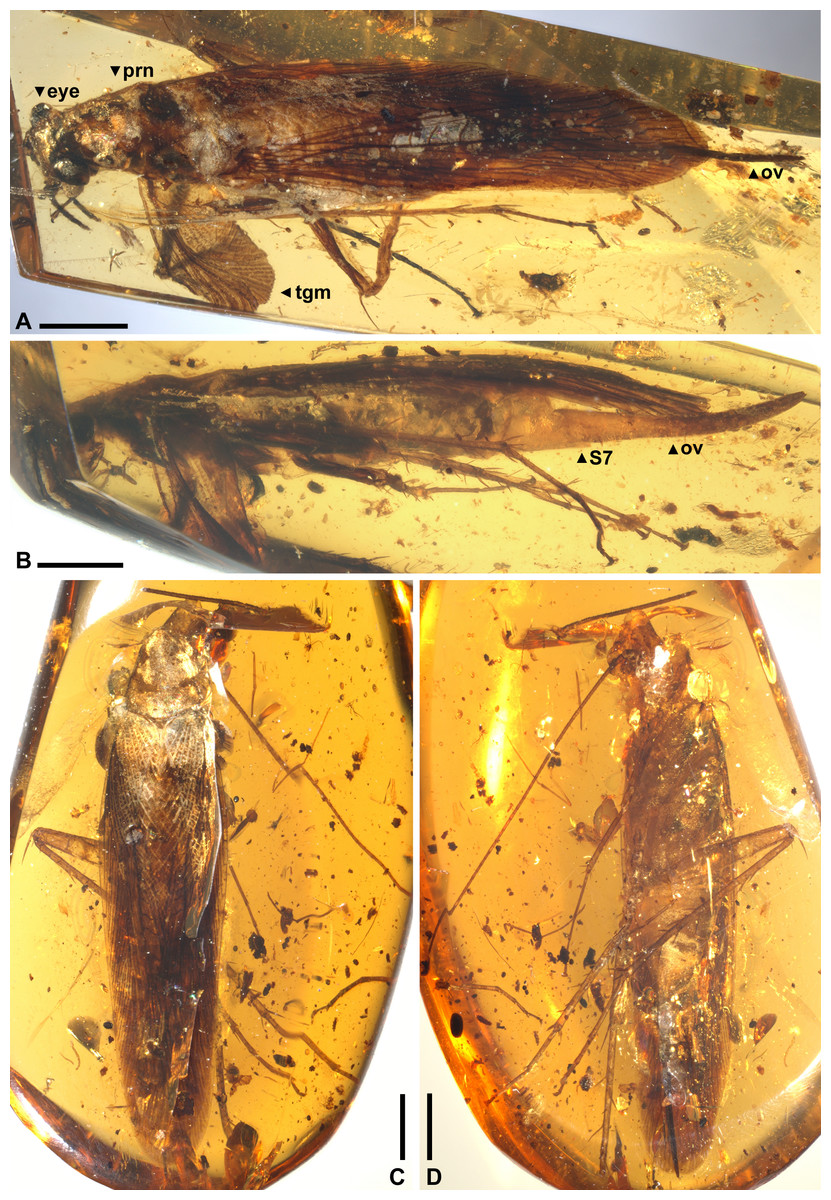
- Holotype and paratype of Ensiferoblatta oecanthoides

Scientific classification
- Kingdom: Animalia
- Phylum: Arthropoda
- Clade: Pancrustacea
- Class: Insecta
- Superorder: Dictyoptera
- Family: †Ensiferoblattidae; Li & Huang, 2023
- Genus: †Ensiferoblatta; Li & Huang, 2023
- Species: †E. oecanthoides

Binomial name
- †Ensiferoblatta oecanthoides Li & Huang, 2023

= Ensiferoblatta =

Ensiferoblatta Temporal range: Early Late Cretaceous (Cenomanian), 98.79 Ma

Monospecific genus of roachoids

Ensiferoblatta is an extinct, monospecific genus of stem-group dictyopterans ("roachoids") that lived in what is now the Hukawng Valley of northern Myanmar, around 98.79 Ma. It is among the youngest "roachoids", alongside Proceroblatta.

== Etymology ==
The generic name, Ensiferoblatta, is derived from the Latin ēnsifera ("sword-bearing"), referring to the long, sabre-shaped ovipositor, and blatta, ("cockroach").

The specific name, oecanthoides, is derived from the tree cricket Oecanthus, as the shape of E. oecanthoides (the type and only species of Ensiferoblatta) is reminiscent of it.

== Description ==
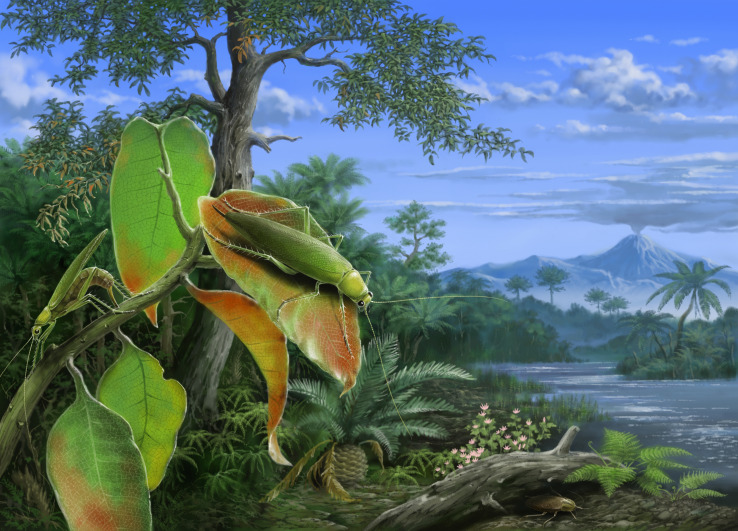
Ecological reconstruction of Ensiferoblatta oecanthoides gen. et sp. nov.

Both the holotype and paratype are females, as they possess a long, sabre-shaped ovipositor, of which is nearly half as long as the entire body. The body length of the holotype, excluding the wings and ovipositor, is greater than the body length of the paratype, with the holotype being 12.3 mm (0.48 in) in length and the paratype being 11.8 mm (0.46 in) in length. However, when including the length of the wings, the paratype measures longer instead, at 16.8 mm (0.66 in), in comparison to the length of the holotype, at 15.3 mm (0.60 in).

== Paleobiology ==
Ensiferoblatta was most likely arboreal, feeding on various angiosperms (flowering plants) and laying eggs into the stems of plants it could bore into.
