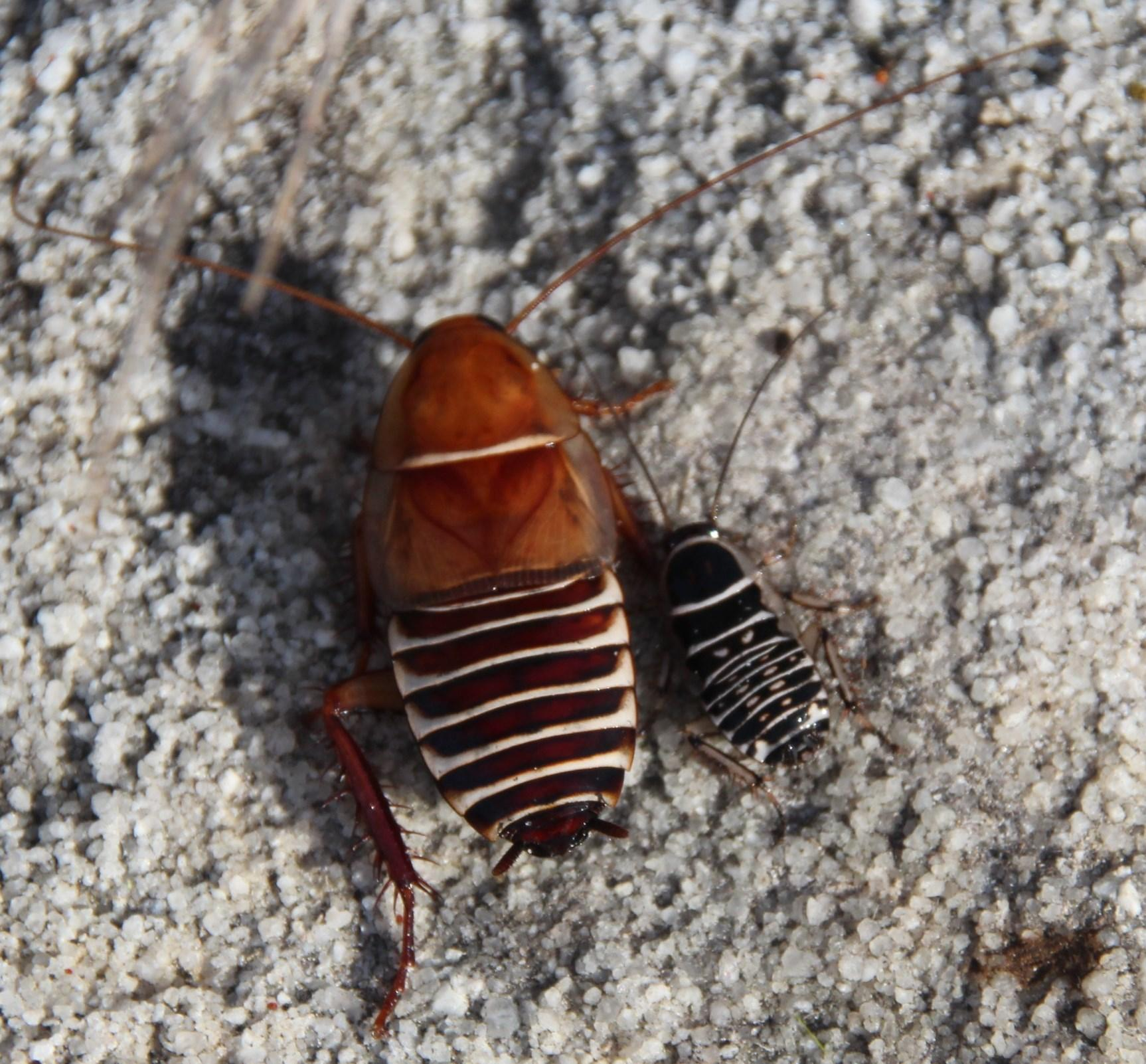

Scientific classification
- Kingdom: Animalia
- Phylum: Arthropoda
- Clade: Pancrustacea
- Class: Insecta
- Order: Blattodea
- Family: Ectobiidae
- Genus: Temnopteryx
- Species: T. phalerata

Binomial name
- Temnopteryx phalerata (Saussure, 1864)

= Temnopteryx phalerata =

Species of cockroach

Temnopteryx phalerata, also known by the common name Cape zebra cockroach, is a species from the genus Temnopteryx.
