= Blattellaquinone =

Names
- Preferred IUPAC name (3,6-Dioxocyclohexa-1,4-dien-1-yl)methyl 3-methylbutanoate
- Other names Blattellaquinone, gentisyl quinone isovalerate

Identifiers
CAS Number	849762-24-9
3D model (JSmol)	Interactive image
ChemSpider	9553964
PubChem CID	11379050
UNII	V44AK4849M
CompTox Dashboard (EPA)	DTXSID00464047
- InChI: InChI=1/C12H14O4/c1-8(2)5-12(15)16-7-9-6-10(13)3-4-11(9)14/h3-4,6,8H,5,7H2,1-2H3 Key: JVMUMZYOAWLJQW-UHFFFAOYAC
- SMILES: O=C/1/C=C\C(=O)\C=C\1COC(=O)CC(C)C

Properties
Chemical formula	C_{12}H_{14}O_{4}
Molar mass	222.240 g·mol^{−1}
- Except where otherwise noted, data are given for materials in their standard state (at 25 °C [77 °F], 100 kPa). Infobox references

Blattellaquinone, also known as gentisyl quinone isovalerate, is a sex pheromone of the German cockroach (Blattella germanica). Blattellaquinone is secreted by females to attract male cockroaches.
