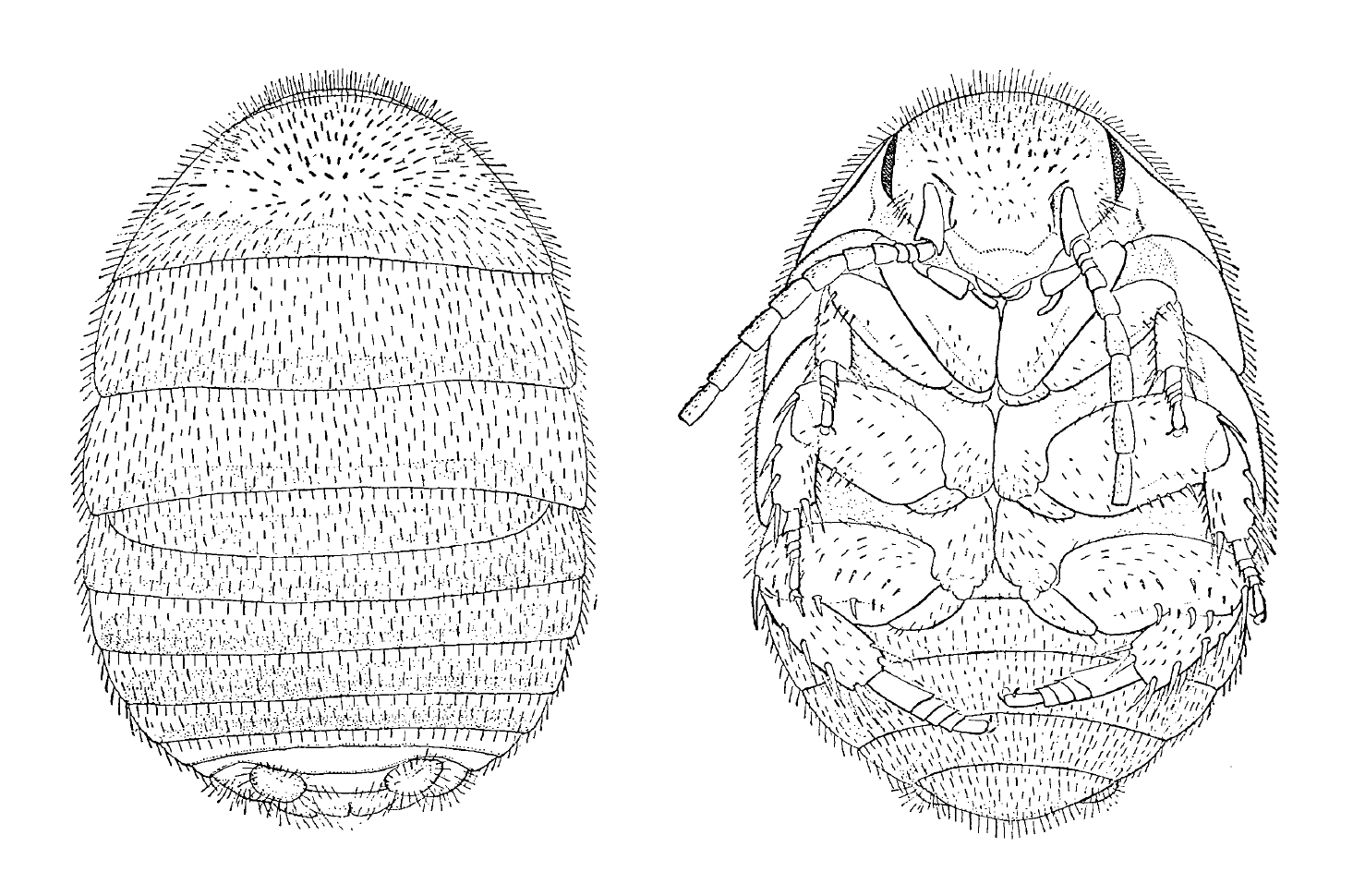
- Attaphila fungicola female

Scientific classification
- Kingdom: Animalia
- Phylum: Arthropoda
- Clade: Pancrustacea
- Class: Insecta
- Order: Blattodea
- Family: Ectobiidae
- Subfamily: Blattellinae
- Genus: Attaphila; Wheeler, 1900

= Attaphila =

Genus of cockroaches that live as myrmecophiles in the nests of leaf-cutting ants

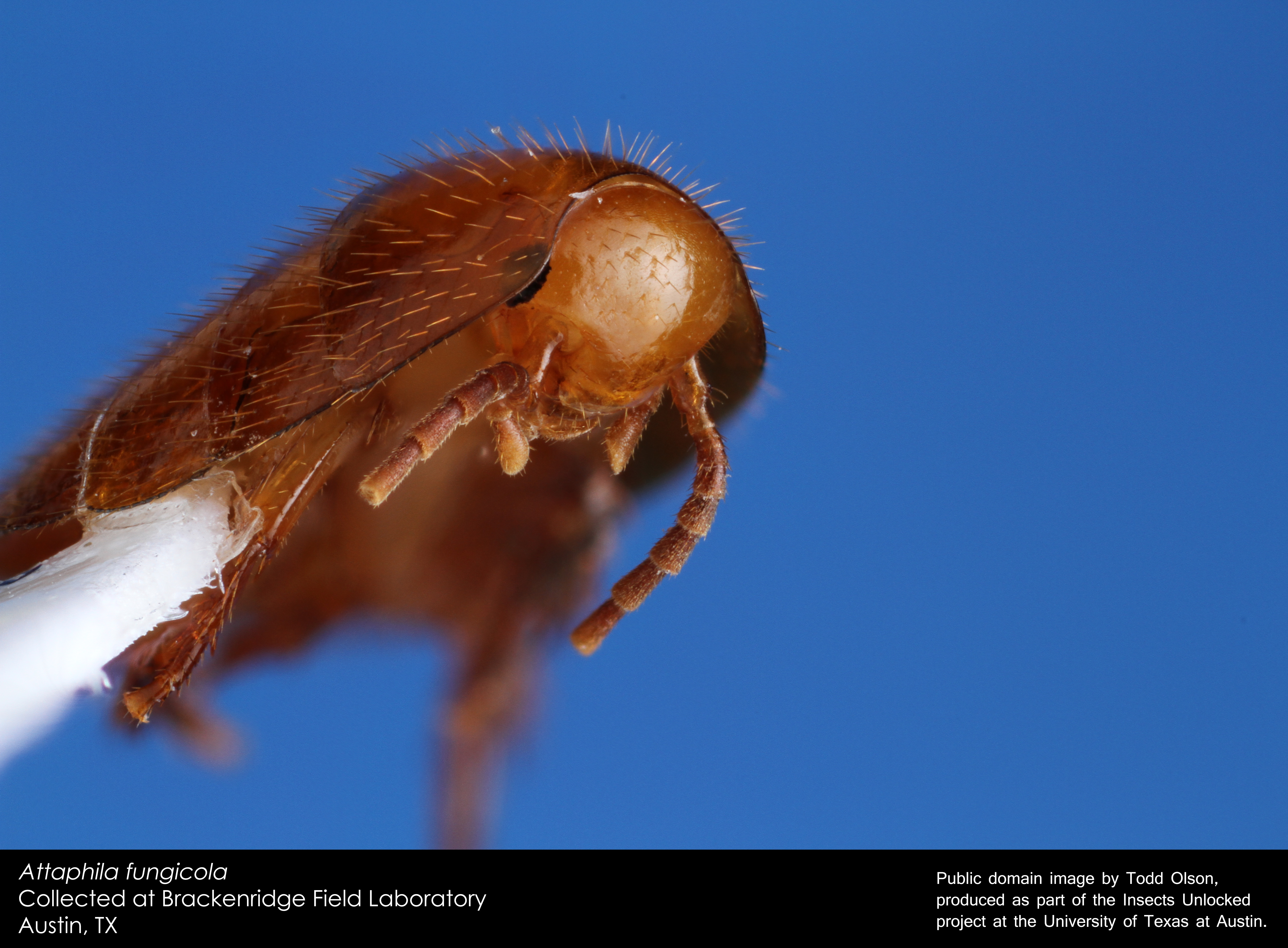
Attaphila fungicola

Attaphila is a genus of cockroaches that live as myrmecophiles in the nests of leaf-cutting ants. They have been suggested to feed on the fungus their host ants farm, or on the cuticular lipids of ant workers. Attaphila are not attacked by host workers because they blend into the colony by mimicking the odour of their hosts ants. Female Attaphila are wingless and males have reduced wings. The cockroaches are phoretic and can disperse to new host colonies by riding on virgin host queens (female alates) departing on their mating flight and by hitchhiking on leaves carried by leaf-cutter ant foragers returning to their nests, or by following leaf-cutter ant pheromone trails

Six species of Attaphila have been described:

- Attaphila fungicola Wheeler, 1900
- Attaphila bergi Bolívar, 1901
- Attaphila aptera Bolivar, 1905
- Attaphila schuppi Bolivar, 1905
- Attaphila sexdentis Bolivar, 1905
- Attaphila flava Gurney, 1937
