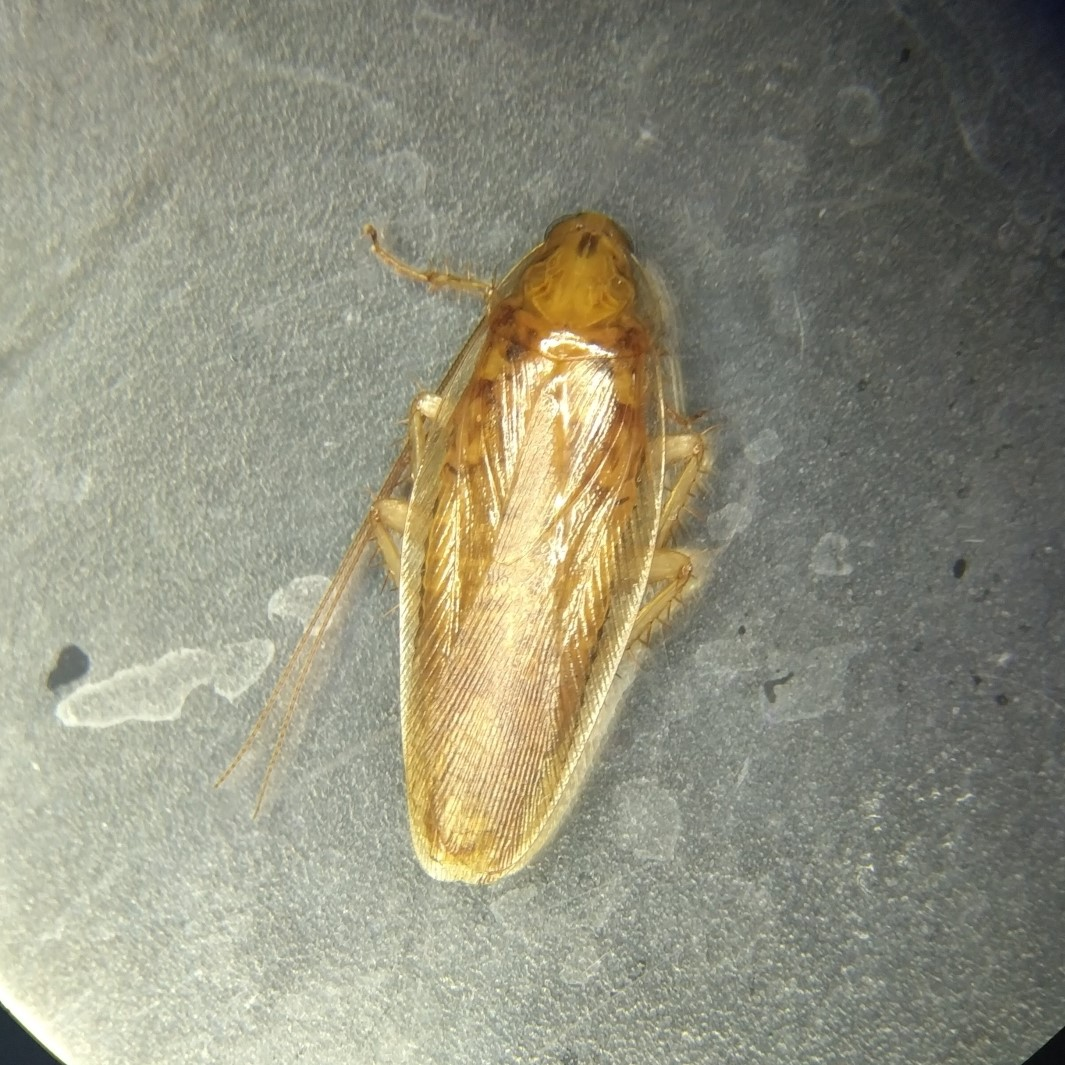

Scientific classification
- Kingdom: Animalia
- Phylum: Arthropoda
- Clade: Pancrustacea
- Class: Insecta
- Order: Blattodea
- Family: Ectobiidae
- Genus: Blattella
- Species: B. biligata

Binomial name
- Blattella biligata (Walker, 1868)

= Blattella biligata =

Species of cockroach

Blattella biligata, also known by the common name tworidge roach, is a species of cockroach in the family Ectobiidae.
