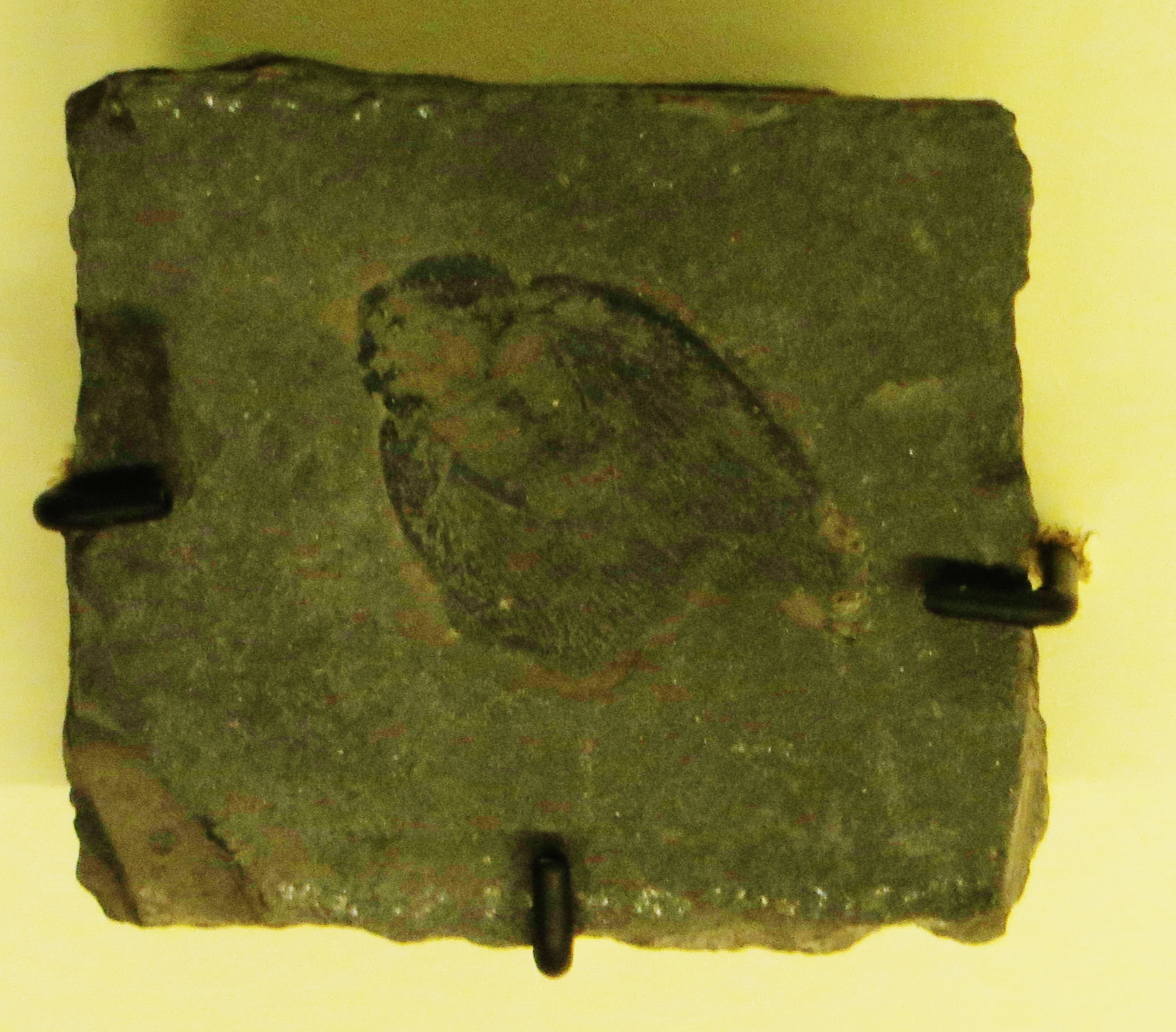

Scientific classification
- Kingdom: Animalia
- Phylum: Arthropoda
- Class: Insecta
- Order: †Blattoptera
- Family: †Archimylacridae
- Subfamily: †Archimylacrinae
- Genus: †Archimylacris; Scudder, 1868

Type species
- Archimylacris acadica Scudder, 1868

Other species
- Archimylacris atrebatica Pruvost, 1919; Archimylacris belgica Handlirsch, 1904; Archimylacris bertrandi Pruvost, 1919; Archimylacris bucheti Pruvost, 1912; Archimylacris calopteryx Handlirsch, 1906; Archimylacris eggintoni Bolton, 1921; Archimylacris johnsoni Woodward, 1887; Archimylacris lerichei Pruvost, 1919; Archimylacris lubnensis Kušta, 1883; Archimylacris oberstebrinki Schmidt, 1962; Archimylacris parallelum Scudder, 1879; Archimylacris? paucinervis Scudder, 1890; Archimylacris regularis Bolton, 1934; Archimylacris scalaris Bolton, 1930; Archimylacris schmidti Boersma, 1969; Archimylacris simoni Pruvost, 1919; Archimylacris straeleni Pruvost, 1930; Archimylacris venusta Lesquereux, 1860

= Archimylacris =

Archimylacris Temporal range: Carboniferous, Westphalian-Stephanian

Extinct genus of cockroach-like animals

Archimylacris (meaning "primitive Mylacris", in reference to another species of Carboniferous cockroach) is an extinct genus of cockroach-like blattopterans, a group of insects ancestral to cockroaches, mantids, and termites.

Archimylacris lived on the warm, swampy forest floors of North America and Europe 300 million years ago, in the Late Carboniferous times. Like modern cockroaches, this insect had a large head shield with long, curved antennae, or feelers, and folded wings. To a modern observer, it would likely appear as a moderate-sized cockroach, with a "tail" (ovipositor) in the female. Presumably, its habits would be cockroach-like, too, scurrying along the undergrowth eating anything edible, possibly falling prey to labyrinthodont amphibians and very early reptiles. The average length of Archimylacris species was 2–3 centimetres (0.8–1.2 in).
