= German cockroach =

Scientific classification
- Kingdom: Animalia
- Phylum: Arthropoda
- Clade: Pancrustacea
- Class: Insecta
- Order: Blattodea
- Superfamily: Blaberoidea
- Family: Ectobiidae
- Subfamily: Blattellinae
- Genus: Blattella
- Species: B. germanica

Binomial name
- Blattella germanica Linnaeus, 1767

Species of cockroach

The German cockroach (Blattella germanica), colloquially known as the croton bug, is a species of small cockroach, typically about 1.1 to 1.6 cm (0.43 to 0.63 in) long. In color it varies from tan to almost black, and it has two dark, roughly parallel, streaks on the pronotum running anteroposteriorly from behind the head to the base of the wings. Although B. germanica has wings, it can barely fly, although it may glide when disturbed. Of the few species of cockroach that are domestic pests, it probably is the most widely troublesome example. It is very closely related to the Asian cockroach, and to the casual observer, the two appear nearly identical and may be mistaken for each other.

== History ==
Previously thought to be a native of Europe, the German cockroach later was considered to have emerged from the region of Ethiopia in Northeast Africa, but recent evidence indicates that it actually originated in South Asia or Southeast Asia, and diverged from Blattella asahinai slightly over 2,000 years ago. The cockroach's sensitivity to cold might reflect its origin from such warm climates, and its spread as a domiciliary pest since ancient times has resulted from incidental human transport and shelter. The species now is cosmopolitan in distribution, occurring as a household pest on all continents except Antarctica, and on many major islands, as well. It accordingly has been given various names in the cultures of many regions.

== Biology and pest status ==
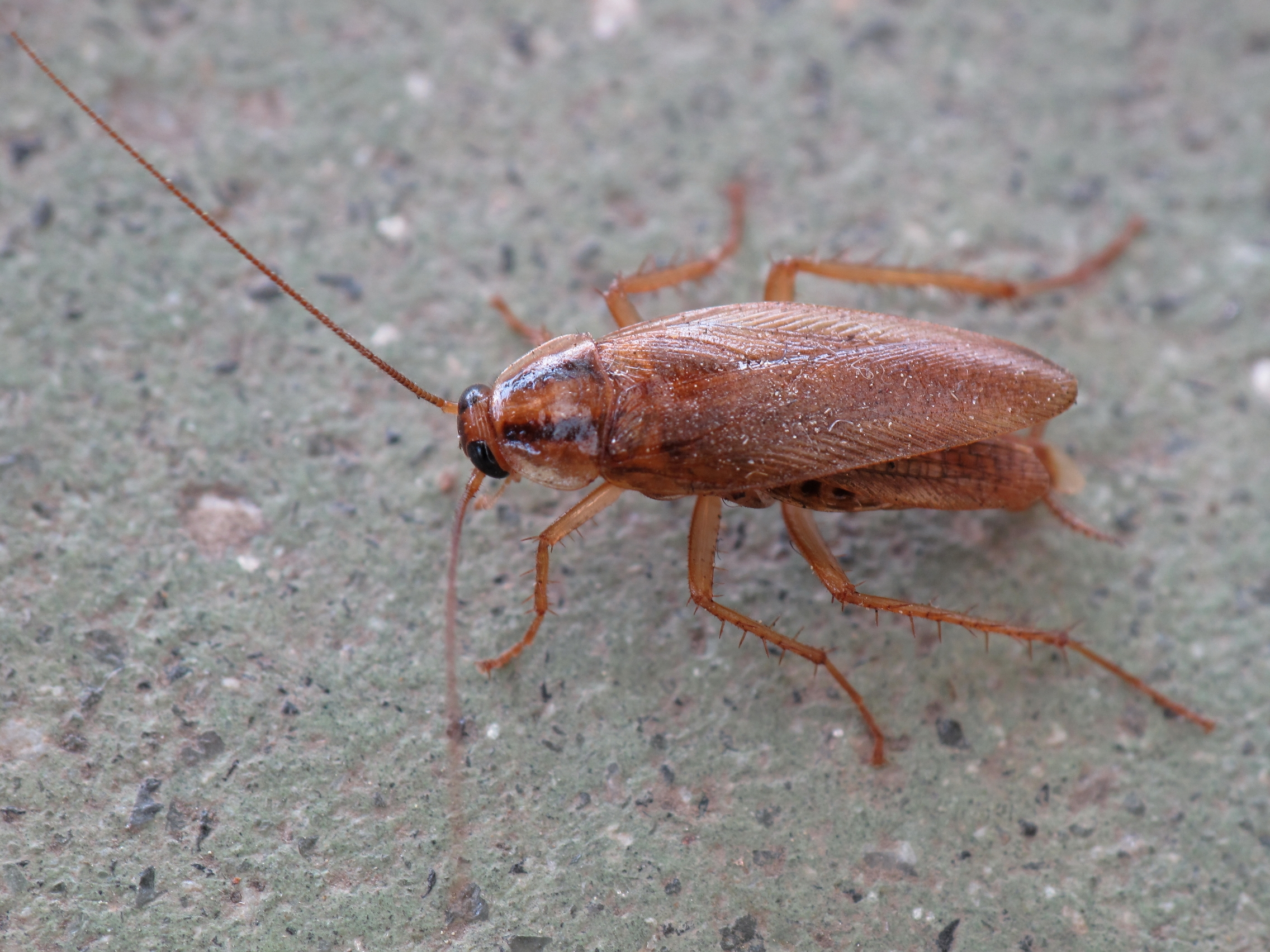
German cockroach on concrete or stone

The German cockroach occurs widely in buildings, but is particularly associated with restaurants, food processing facilities, hotels, and institutional establishments such as nursing homes and hospitals. They can survive outside as well, though they are not commonly found in the wild. In cold climates, they occur only near human dwellings, because they cannot survive severe cold. However, German cockroaches have been found as inquilines ("tenants") of human buildings as far north as Alert, Nunavut. Similarly, they have been found as far south as southern Patagonia.

Though nocturnal, the German cockroach occasionally appears by day, especially if the population is crowded or has been disturbed. However, sightings are most frequent in the evening, when someone suddenly brings a light into a room deserted after dark, such as a kitchen where they have been scavenging. When excited or frightened, the species emits an unpleasant odor.

== Diet ==
German cockroaches are omnivorous scavengers. They are attracted particularly to meats, starches, sugars, and fatty foods. Where a shortage of foodstuff exists, they may eat household items such as soap, glue, and toothpaste. In famine conditions, they turn cannibalistic, chewing at each other's wings and legs. The German cockroach is an intermediate host of the Acanthocephalan parasite Moniliformis kalahariensis.

== Reproduction ==
The German cockroach reproduces faster than any other residential cockroach, growing from egg to reproductive adult in roughly 50 – 60 days under ideal conditions. Females are rounder and shorter in contrast to males which tend to be longer, narrower and of lighter color. Once fertilized, a female German cockroach develops an ootheca in its abdomen. Its abdomen swells as the eggs develop, until the translucent tip of the ootheca begins to protrude from the end of the abdomen, and by that time the eggs inside are fully sized, about 1/4 inch (6.4 mm) long with 16 segments.

The ootheca, at first translucent, soon turns white and then within a few hours turns pink, progressively darkening until, some 48 hours later, it attains the dark red-brown of the shell of a chestnut. It has a keel-like ridge along the line where the young emerge, and curls slightly towards that edge as it completes its maturation. A small percentage of the nymphs may hatch while the ootheca is still attached to the female, but the majority emerge some 24 hours after it has detached from the female's body. The newly hatched 3-mm-long black nymphs then progress through six or seven instars before becoming sexually mature, but ecdysis is such a hazardous process that nearly half the nymphs die of natural causes before reaching adulthood. Molted skins and dead nymphs are soon eaten by living nymphs present at the time of molting.

== Pest control ==
The German cockroach is very successful at establishing an ecological niche in buildings, and is resilient in the face of many pest-control measures. Reasons include:

- lack of natural predators in a human habitat
- prolific reproduction
- short reproductive cycle
- the ability to hide in very small refuges
- sexual maturity attained within several weeks, and
- adaptation and resistance to some chemical pesticides

The German cockroach is resistant to 42 active ingredients from most major groups of synthetic insecticides such as organochlorides, organophosphates, carbamates, synthetic pyrethroids, neonicotinoids, oxadiazines, and phenyl pyrazoles. German cockroach resistance was first observed with chlordane in 1952. Because German cockroaches have a very high number of genes, they can adapt and evolve resistance to pesticides. They also have many receptors for smell and can sense new food sources.

German cockroaches are thigmotactic, meaning they prefer confined spaces, and they are small compared to other pest species, so they can hide within small cracks and crevices that are easy to overlook, thereby evading humans and their eradication efforts.

To be effective, control measures must be comprehensive, sustained, and systematic; survival of just a few eggs is quite enough to regenerate a nearly exterminated pest population within a few generations, and recolonization from surrounding populations often is very rapid, too.

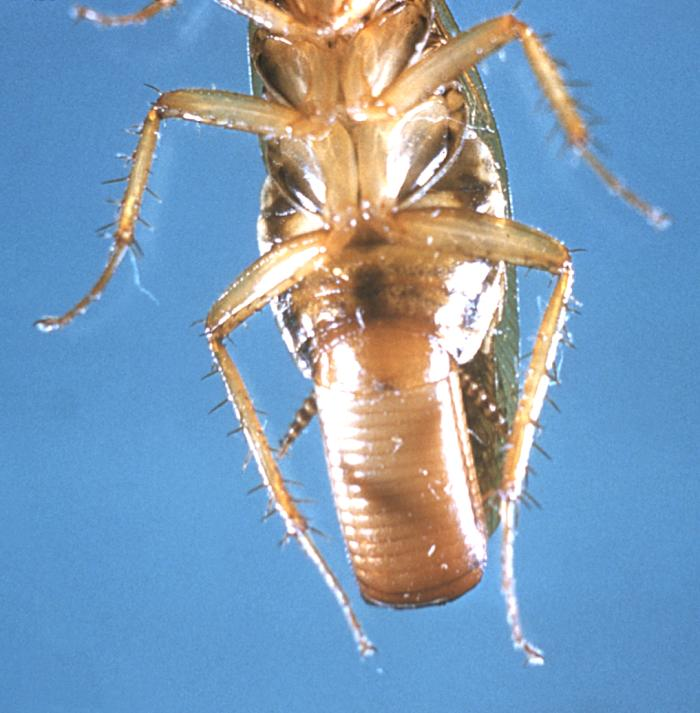
Female German cockroach with ootheca

Another problem in controlling German cockroaches is the nature of their population behavior. Though they are not social and practice no organized maternal care, females carry oothecae of 18-50 eggs (average about 32) during incubation until just before hatching, instead of dropping them as most other species of cockroaches do. This protects the eggs from certain classes of predation. Then, after hatching, nymphs largely survive by consuming excretions and molts from adults, thereby establishing their own internal microbial populations and avoiding contact with most insecticidal surface treatments and baits. One effective control is insect growth regulators (hydroprene, methoprene, etc.), which act by preventing molting, thus prevent maturation of the various instars. Caulking baseboards and around pipes may prevent the travel of adults from one apartment to another within a building.

As an adaptive consequence of pest control by poisoned glucose baits, a strain of German cockroaches has emerged that reacts to glucose as distastefully bitter. They refuse to eat baits sweetened with glucose, which presents an obstacle to their control, given that several common baits use glucose.

== Comparison of three common cockroaches ==
Species	German cockroach	Oriental cockroach	American cockroach
Size	13–16 mm (0.51–0.63 in)	18–29 mm (0.71–1.14 in)	29–53 mm (1.1–2.1 in)
Preferred temperature	15–35 °C (59–95 °F)	20–30 °C (68–86 °F)	20–29 °C (68–84 °F)
Nymphal development (Note: Dependent on several factors, including temperature (significantly), sex, and nutrition.)	54–215 days (at 24–35 °C (75–95 °F))	164–542 days (at 22–30 °C (72–86 °F))	150–360 days (at 25–30 °C (77–86 °F))
Lifespan	Around 200 days	35–190 days	90–706 days
Able to fly?	No	No	Yes (Note: American cockroaches can fly short distances, usually starting from high places, but real flight is uncommon, despite popular belief.)

== Genome ==
The genome of the German cockroach was published in February 2018 in Nature Ecology and Evolution. The relatively large genome (2.0 Gb) harbours a very high number of proteins, of which most notably one group of chemoreceptors, called the ionotropic receptors, is particularly numerous. These chemoreceptors possibly allow the German cockroach to detect a broad range of chemical cues from toxins, food, pathogens, and pheromones.

== See also ==
- Blattellaquinone, a sex pheromone of the German cockroach
