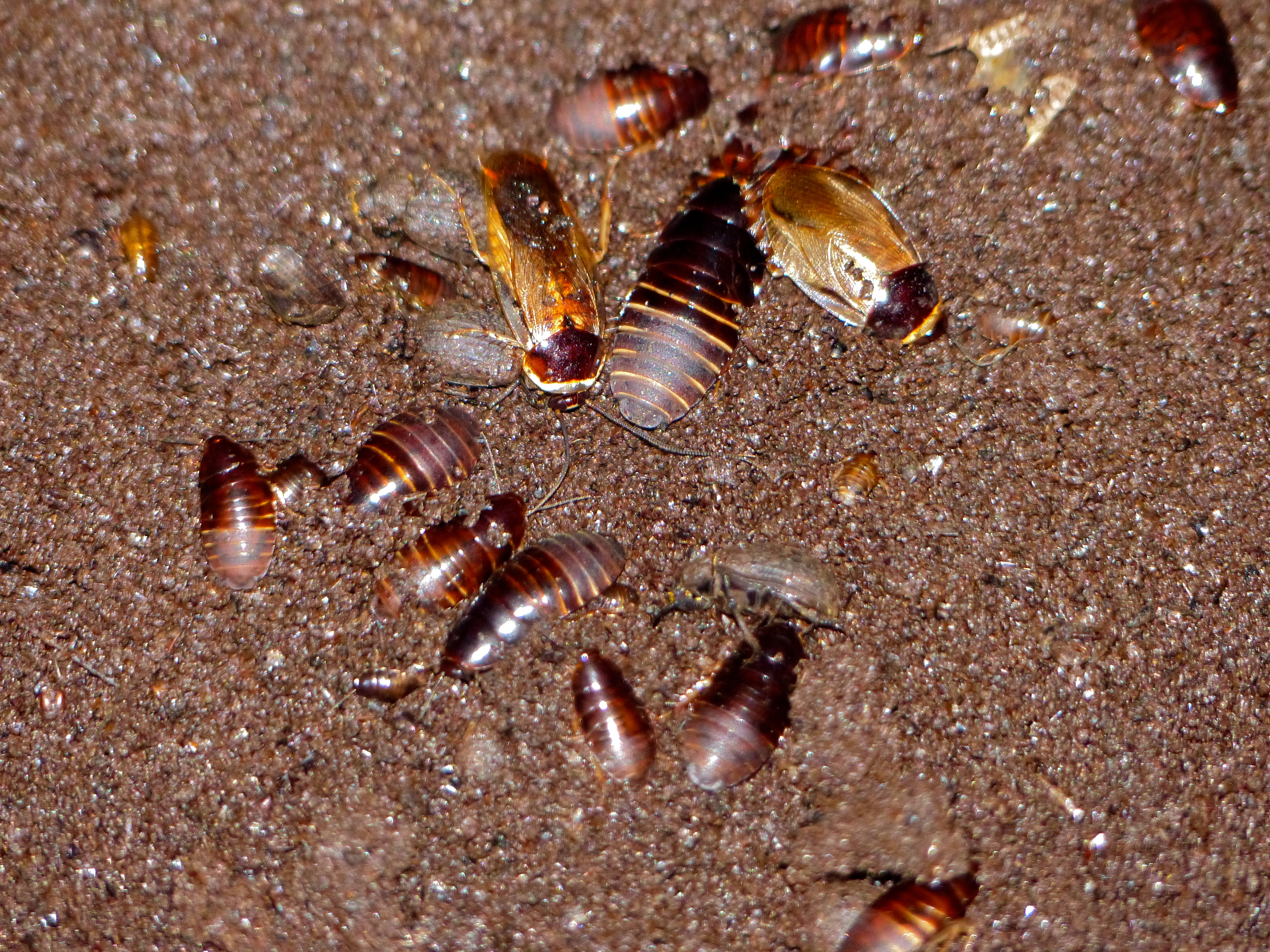

Scientific classification
- Kingdom: Animalia
- Phylum: Arthropoda
- Clade: Pancrustacea
- Class: Insecta
- Order: Blattodea
- Family: Blaberidae
- Genus: Pycnoscelus
- Species: P. indicus

Binomial name
- Pycnoscelus indicus (Fabricius, 1775)

= Pycnoscelus indicus =

Species of insect

Pycnoscelus indicus is a species of burrowing cockroach in the genus Pycnoscelus, family Blaberidae., which is native to South Asia, Southeast Asia, and parts of East Asia.

It is a bisexual relative of Pycnoscelus surinamensis, which reproduces parthenogenetically.

== History ==
Prior to 1967, it was considered the bisexual form of P. surinamensis, after a series of experiments, Roth confirmed that they represent a different species

It is the sexual progenitor species of P. surinamensis, which reproduces solely by parthenogenesis, having evolved as a clonal, all female lineage. unlike in P. surinamensis, males of P. indicus are fertile.

It was described in 1775 by Fabricius.
