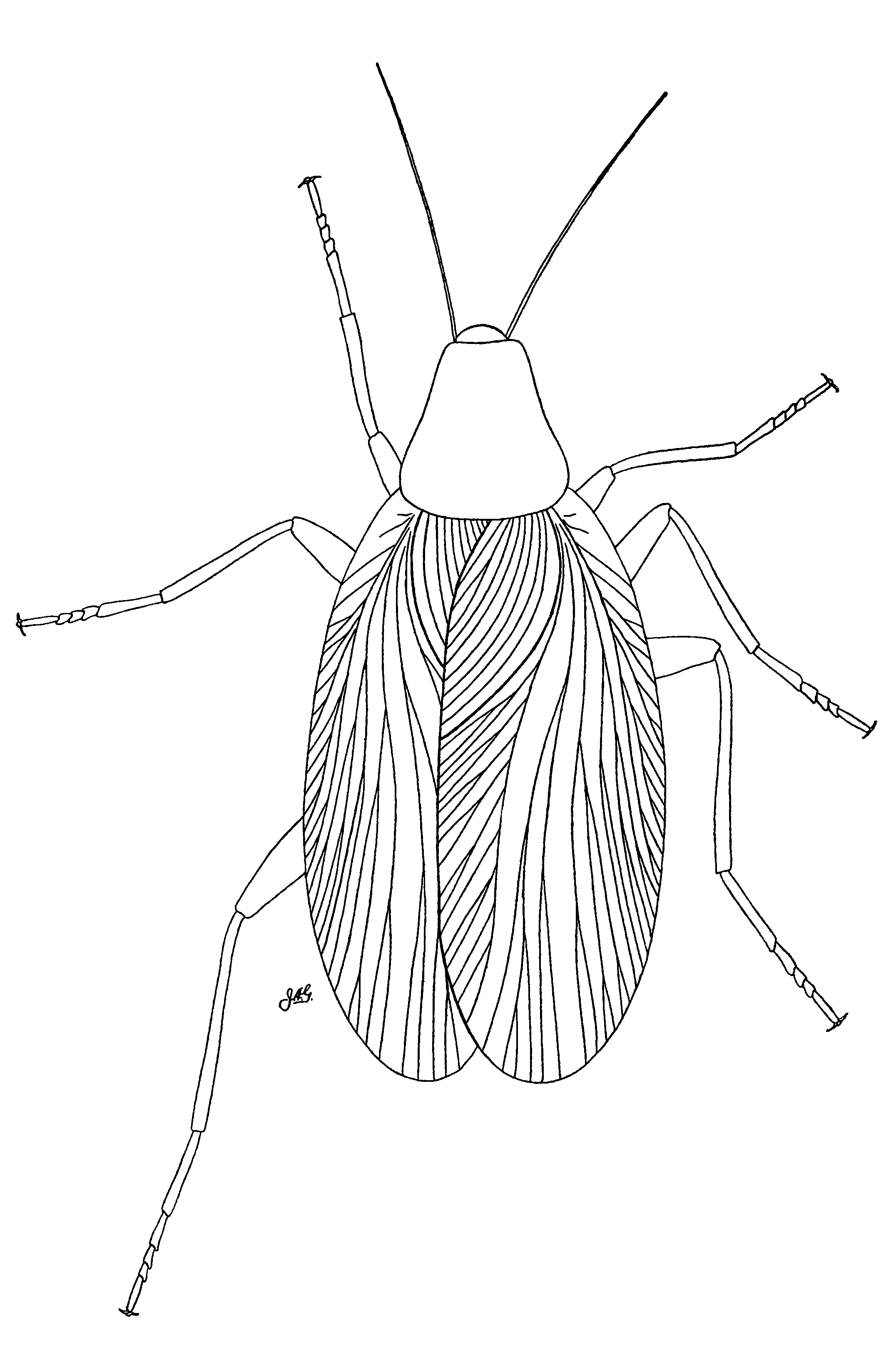
- Reconstruction of Progonoblattina (=Archoblattina) beecheri from the Late Carboniferous of North America

Scientific classification
- Kingdom: Animalia
- Phylum: Arthropoda
- Clade: Pancrustacea
- Class: Insecta
- Cohort: Polyneoptera
- Superorder: Dictyoptera

Subdivisions
- †Poroblattinidae; †Archoblattinidae; †Phyloblattidae; †Mylacridae; †Spiloblattinidae; †Neorthroblattinidae; †Necymylacridae; †Compsoblattidae; †Ensiferoblattidae; †Subioblattidae; Among others

Cladistically included but traditionally excluded taxa
- Blattodea; Mantodea; †Alienoptera

= Roachoid =

Roachoid Temporal range: Late Carboniferous–Late Cretaceous

Extinct paraphyletic group of insects

"Roachoids", also known as "Roachids", "Blattoids" or Eoblattodea, are members of the stem group of Dictyoptera (the group containing modern cockroaches, termites and praying mantises). They generally resemble cockroaches, but most members, unlike modern dictyopterans, have generally long external ovipositors, and are thought not to have laid ootheca like modern dictyopterans.

== Systematic position ==
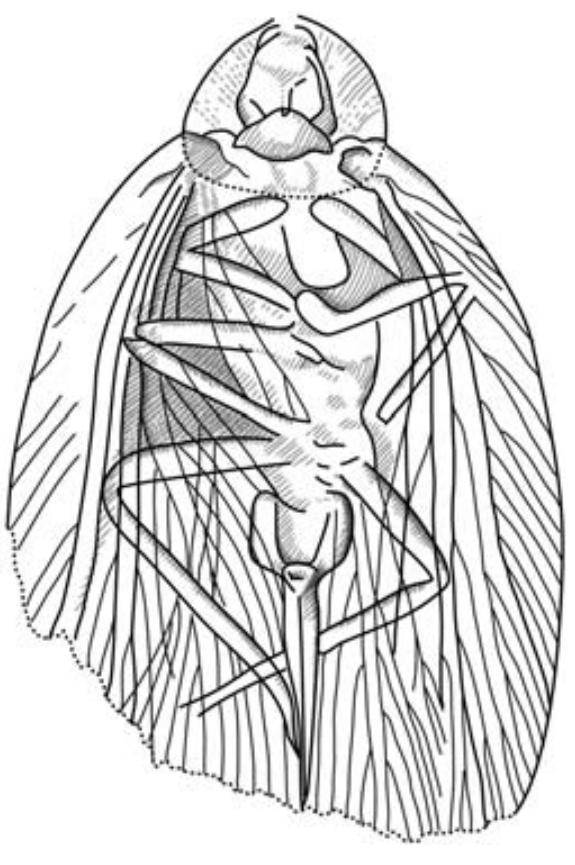
Interpretive drawing of a specimen of Anthracoblattina ensifera (Phyloblattidae) in ventral view, showing prominent external ovipositor

Cockroaches are popularly thought to be an ancient order of insects, with their origins in the Carboniferous. However, since the middle of the 20th century it has been known that the primitive cockroach insects found fossilized in Palaeozoic strata are the forerunners not only of modern cockroaches and termites but also of mantises. The origin of these groups from a blattopteran stock are now generally thought to be in the Early Jurassic; the earliest modern cockroaches appeared during the Late Jurassic. Thus, the "Palaeozoic cockroaches" are not cockroaches per se, but a paraphyletic assemblage of primitive relatives. The youngest known roachoids date to the Cretaceous, by which time they were rare compared to modern cockroaches.

== Anatomy and habits ==
The fossils assigned to the "roachoids" are of general cockroach-like build, with a large disc-like pronotum covering most of the head, long antennae, legs built for running, flattened body and heavily veined wings with the distinct arched CuP-vein so typical of modern cockroach wings. Like modern cockroaches, the roachoids were probably swift litter inhabitants living on a wide range of dead plant and animal matter.

Contrary to modern forms, female roachoids all have a well-developed external ovipositor. They probably inserted eggs into substrate. The egg pods, called ootheca, seen in modern dictyopterans is a new shared trait (synapomorphy) separating them from their primitive ancestors. Some of the roachoid species could reach relatively large sizes compared to most of their modern relatives, like Progonoblattina and Necymylacris from Carboniferous reach around 9 centimetres (3 1/2 in) in total length, and the largest Opsiomylacris having wings reaching 7.5 centimetres (3 in), close to modern largest cockroach Megaloblatta longipennis.

Some roachoids strongly deviated from a cockroach-like form. Ensiferoblatta and Proceroblatta from the Burmese amber of Myanmar, around 100 million years old, among some of the youngest known "roachoids" have a morphology resembling that of tree crickets.

== See also ==
- Archimylacris
- Cockroach
