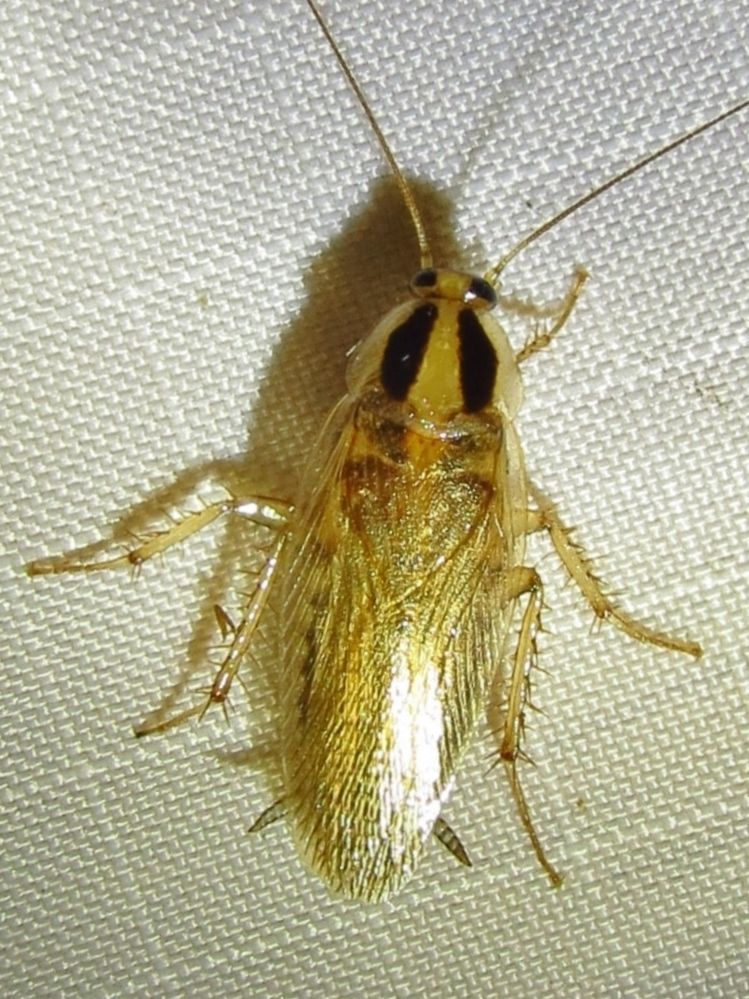

Scientific classification
- Kingdom: Animalia
- Phylum: Arthropoda
- Clade: Pancrustacea
- Class: Insecta
- Order: Blattodea
- Family: Ectobiidae
- Genus: Blattella
- Species: B. vaga

Binomial name
- Blattella vaga Hebard, 1935

= Blattella vaga =

Species of cockroach

Blattella vaga, the field cockroach, is a species of cockroach in the family Ectobiidae. It is introduced to Central America and North America and is native to Southern and Southwestern Asia.
