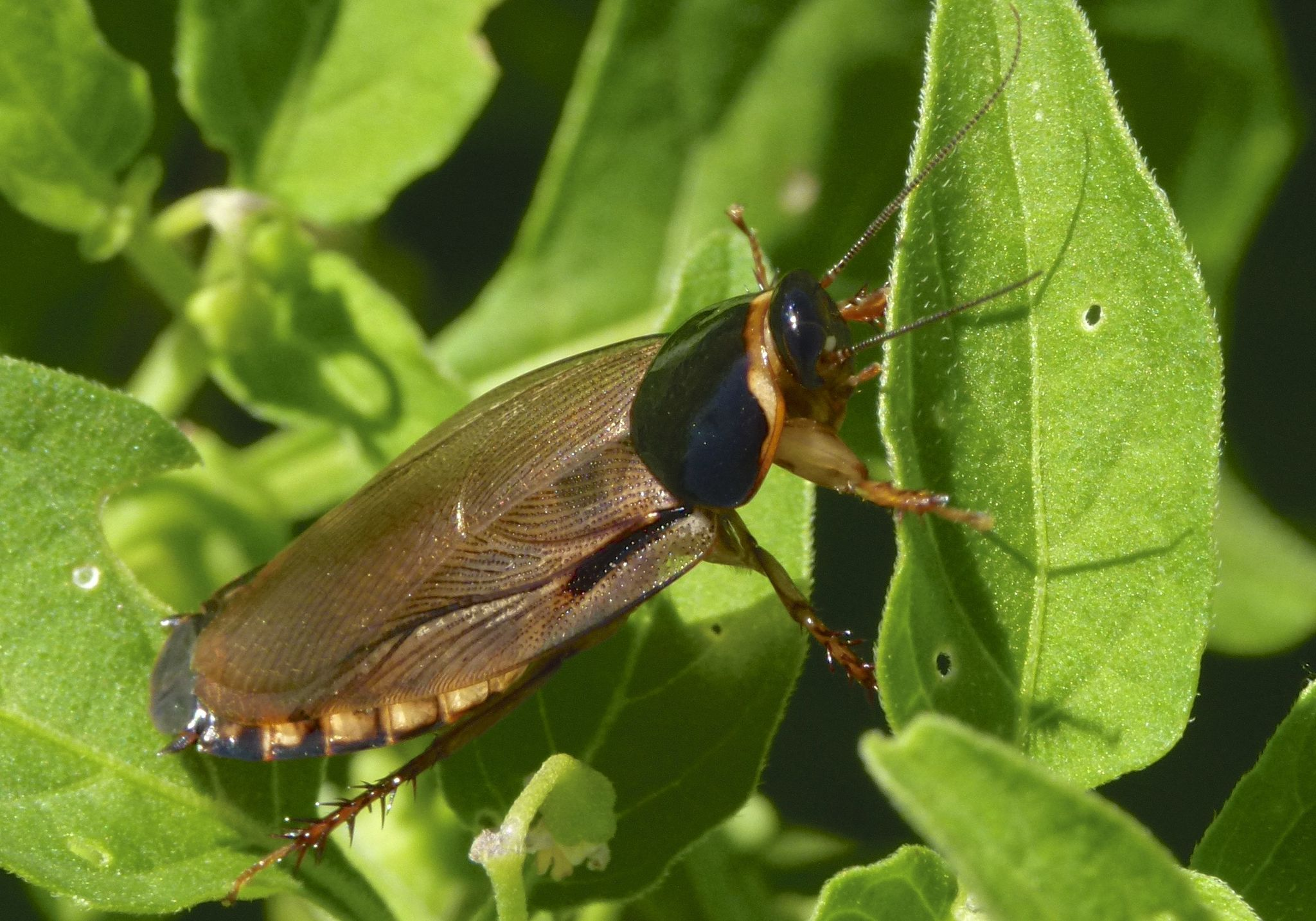

Scientific classification
- Kingdom: Animalia
- Phylum: Arthropoda
- Clade: Pancrustacea
- Class: Insecta
- Order: Blattodea
- Family: Blaberidae
- Genus: Pycnoscelus
- Species: P. surinamensis

Binomial name
- Pycnoscelus surinamensis (Linnaeus, 1758)

= Surinam cockroach =

Species of cockroach

The Surinam cockroach or greenhouse cockroach (Pycnoscelus surinamensis) is a species of burrowing cockroach. It is a common plant pest endemic to the Indomalayan realm that has spread to tropical and into subtropical regions around the world, and in isolated populations to temperate climates where protective habitat such as greenhouses provide shelter for individuals inadvertently shipped in the soil of plants. Its populations are almost exclusively female, and it reproduces through parthenogenesis, having evolved several clonal strains from its sexual progenitor P. indicus.

== Description ==
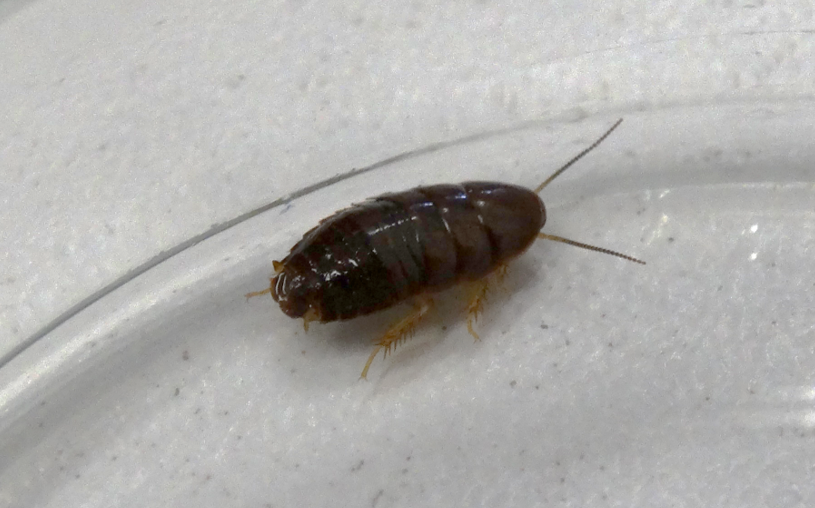
Nymph

Adults are around 18–25 mm (0.71–0.98 in) in length, and have dark brown to black bodies with shiny paler brown wings. The front edge of the pronotum (head shield) has a pale white band. While males are rarely produced, male adults have longer wings than females, completely covering the abdomen, although both sexes are poor flyers.

Nymphs are around 4.5 mm (0.18 in) long at birth, translucent white with orange-brown mandibles and spines, and darker eye spots than the rest of the head. The exoskeleton gradually hardens on exposure to air, becoming a glossy brown in 5 to 6 hours, while its underside and legs remain translucent. Older nymphs develop shiny black anterior abdominal segments, and roughened, dull black posterior segments.

== Range ==
P. surinamensis originated in the Indomalayan region and is now cosmopolitan, found around the world in tropical regions, extending into subtropical regions, and temporarily establishing populations in protective habitats in temperate climates, particularly in greenhouses (also called glasshouses) or other areas heated during colder periods. It can be spread to greenhouses with shipments of tropical plants. In the United States it is common in the southeastern region from North Carolina to Texas, in addition to temporary populations in more temperate climates.

== Habitat ==
P. surinamensis is a burrowing cockroach, commonly burrowing in loose soil, humus, mould, compost piles and lawn thatch, or hiding beneath rocks, rotten branches, trash and other debris. It is considered peridomestic, found living only near human constructions or crops in a 1996 study, and may be considered synanthropic. It has a relatively high rate of cutaneous water loss compared to non-burrowing species of cockroaches, and is nearly exclusively associated with moist soil across its range.

== Pest ==
While the species is occasionally found inside homes, it is not a common household pest. It is a plantation and garden pest in tropical regions, and can be especially problematic in heated greenhouses, where large numbers can hide by day and emerge at night, gnawing the softer parts of plants. It is thought to be transferred into homes and businesses in potted plants or mulch used for potted plants.

Indoor infestations can often be controlled using sprays or granules on potted plants. Outdoor treatment should focus on infested locations such as wood piles, mulch, and foundation plantings, and a residual barrier spray may be useful around houses.

== Parthenogenesis ==
An unusual aspect of P. surinamensis is that the species reproduces parthenogenetically, a form of asexual reproduction in which embryos develop from unfertilized eggs. P. surinamensis reproduce by thelytokous parthenogenesis, a type of parthenogenesis in which offspring are almost exclusively female clones. Thelytokous parthenesis is known in about 1% of known animal species.

Optional thelkytokous parthenogenesis occurs in several cockroach species when females are isolated from males, including in the common domestic pests Blatta orientalis, Blattella germanica, and Periplaneta americana, but in P. surinamensis it is obligatory parthenogenesis, its sole means of reproduction. Earlier taxonomy treated P. surinamensis as a species with both sexual and asexual forms, reproducing asexually in some populations, but sexually in other populations. Roth in 1967 applied the name P. indicus (Fabricius, 1775) to the sexually-reproducing taxon from which the parthenogenetic form P. surinamensis is descended. While P. surinamensis is cosmopolitan, P. indicus is endemic to the Indomalayasian region and adjacent parts of Southeast Asia, and spread just to Hawaiian and Mauritian islands.

In P. surinamensis, males are rarely born and are nonfunctional with frequency varying by population. An Australian colony being studied produced several, while none were seen in a Florida colony in over 15 years of study. In a parthenogenetic moth the rate varied by how long a population was stabilized, which suggests the possibility that the Australian colony may have developed parthenogenesis more recently than the Florida colony.

P. surinamensis has at least 21 diploid clones, born independently from sexual females, meaning the thelytokous parthenogenesis has evolved repeatedly. There are also 11 known triploid clones, produced by backcrosses between clones and P. indicus. Different clones have established populations throughout the species' range, with at least ten different clone populations present in the United States alone.

Obligatory parthenogenesis was known only in P. surinamensis until 2003, when it was reported in a form of the species Phyllodromica subaptera. Asexual forms of P. subaptera, spread through most Mediterranean countries, are morphologically indistinguishable from the sexual form, found only on the Iberian peninsula, suggesting the trait was relatively recently acquired.

== Gestation and birth ==
Reproduction is usually ovoviviparous, the ootheca carried internally during gestation until nymphs hatch within the body and are delivered, usually at night or in darkness. Occasionally stress or other factors may result in premature release of the ootheca, which can result in non-viability of the eggs. The ootheca itself measures 9x3.5x2.5 mm, housing 30-36 eggs in two rows of alternately spaced segments. Remains of the egg case are expelled around the time the nymphs are being born, sometimes pulled out with the hind limbs, and the ootheca fragments are usually quickly devoured by the newborn nymphs.

== Parasite Host ==
P. surinamensis acts as the intermediate host for the parasitic roundworms Oxyspirura mansoni and Oxyspirura parvorum, which infect the eyes of poultry.

O. mansoni, known as the chicken eyeworm among other names, can cause eye problems ranging from mild conjunctivitis to severe ophthalmia and serious vision impairment in its final hosts, which include chickens, turkeys, guineafowl and peafowl. Its life cycle involves eggs passing through a bird's lachrymal duct, being swallowed and passed in the bird's feces, a P. surinamensis cockroach eating the feces, larvae emerging in the cockroach, the bird eating the cockroach, and finally the eye worm larvae migrating up the oesophagus and pharynx to the bird's eye. While O. mansoni is not present in Europe, it is present in many areas of the world, particularly the tropical and subtropical environments where P. surinamensis is permanently established.
