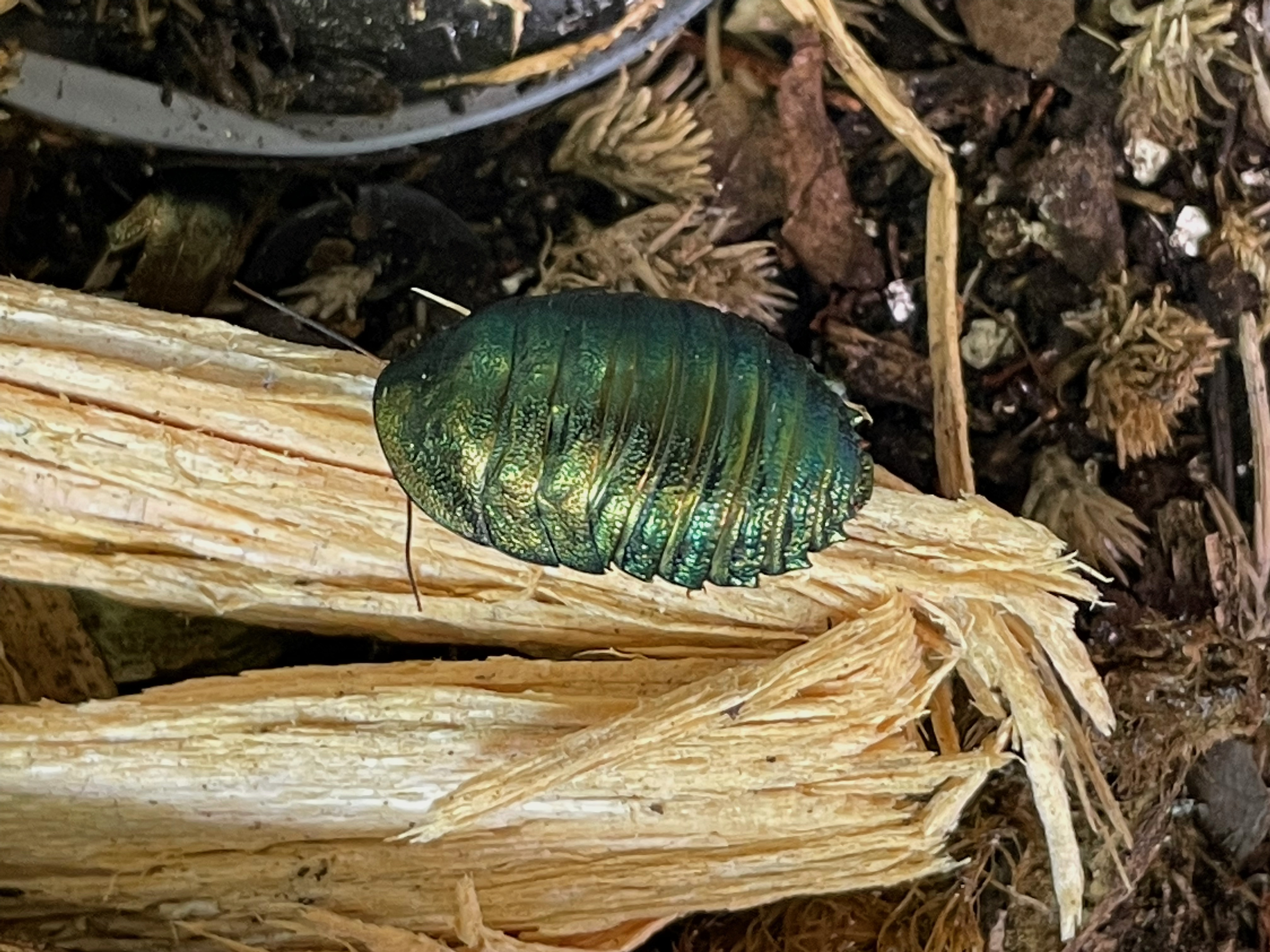
- Corydidarum magnifica

Scientific classification
- Kingdom: Animalia
- Phylum: Arthropoda
- Clade: Pancrustacea
- Class: Insecta
- Order: Blattodea
- Family: Blaberidae
- Subfamily: Perisphaerinae
- Genus: Corydidarum; Brunner von Wattenwyl, 1865

Synonyms
- Pseudoglomeris (Fanoblatta) Rehn, 1933; Glomeriblatta Bey-Bienko, 1950; Kurokia Shiraki, 1906; Trichoblatta Saussure & Zehntner, 1895

= Corydidarum =

Genus of cockroaches

Corydidarum is a genus of Asian cockroaches in the subfamily Perisphaerinae, erected by Carl Brunner von Wattenwyl in 1865. The recorded distribution is central Africa, India, China, SE Asia through to New Guinea.

== Species ==
The Cockroach Species File lists:

1. Corydidarum aerea (Bey-Bienko, 1958)
2. Corydidarum beybienkoi (Anisyutkin, 2003)
3. Corydidarum fallax (Bey-Bienko, 1969)
4. Corydidarum guerini (Saussure & Zehntner, 1895)
5. Corydidarum humbertiana (Saussure, 1863)
6. Corydidarum magnifica (Shelford, 1907)
7. Corydidarum montshadskii (Bey-Bienko, 1969)
8. Corydidarum nepalensis (Saussure & Zehntner, 1895)
9. Corydidarum nigra (Shiraki, 1906)
10. Corydidarum oniscina (Gerstaecker, 1883)
11. Corydidarum pilosa (Bey-Bienko, 1965)
12. Corydidarum pygmaea (Karny, 1915)
13. Corydidarum scopsi (Hanitsch, 1950)
14. Corydidarum sculpta (Bey-Bienko, 1958)
15. Corydidarum semisulcata (Hanitsch, 1924)
16. Corydidarum sericea (Saussure, 1863) - type species (as Perisphaeria [sic] sericea Saussure)
17. Corydidarum tarsalis (Walker, 1868)
18. Corydidarum tolypeutes (Rehn, 1937)
19. Corydidarum valida (Bey-Bienko, 1969)
20. Corydidarum wallacei (Hanitsch, 1933)
21. Corydidarum wellingtoni (Hanitsch, 1931)
