= Rhabdoblattella =

Scientific classification
- Kingdom: Animalia
- Phylum: Arthropoda
- Clade: Pancrustacea
- Class: Insecta
- Order: Blattodea
- Family: Blaberidae
- Subfamily: Rhabdoblattellinae
- Genus: Rhabdoblattella; Anisyutkin, 1999

Genus of cockroaches

Rhabdoblattella is a genus of South East Asian cockroaches in the family Blaberidae, erected by L.N. Anisyutkin in 1999. It was subsequently placed in the monotypic subfamily Rhabdoblattellinae (it had been placed previously in the Epilamprinae) from which the species R. annamensis had been transferred from the similar genus Rhabdoblatta. Species records are from Indochina and China.

== Species ==
The Cockroach Species File includes two species groups:

Rhabdoblattella supersp. cambodiensis Wang, Yang & Wang, 2017

1. Rhabdoblattella annamensis (Hanitsch, 1927)
2. Rhabdoblattella cambodiensis Anisyutkin, 1999 - type species
3. Rhabdoblattella delicata Anisyutkin, 1999
4. Rhabdoblattella hainanensis Wang, Yang & Wang, 2017
5. Rhabdoblattella vietnamensis Anisyutkin, 1999

Rhabdoblattella supersp. disparis Wang, Yang & Wang, 2017

1. Rhabdoblattella disparis Wang, Yang & Wang, 2017
