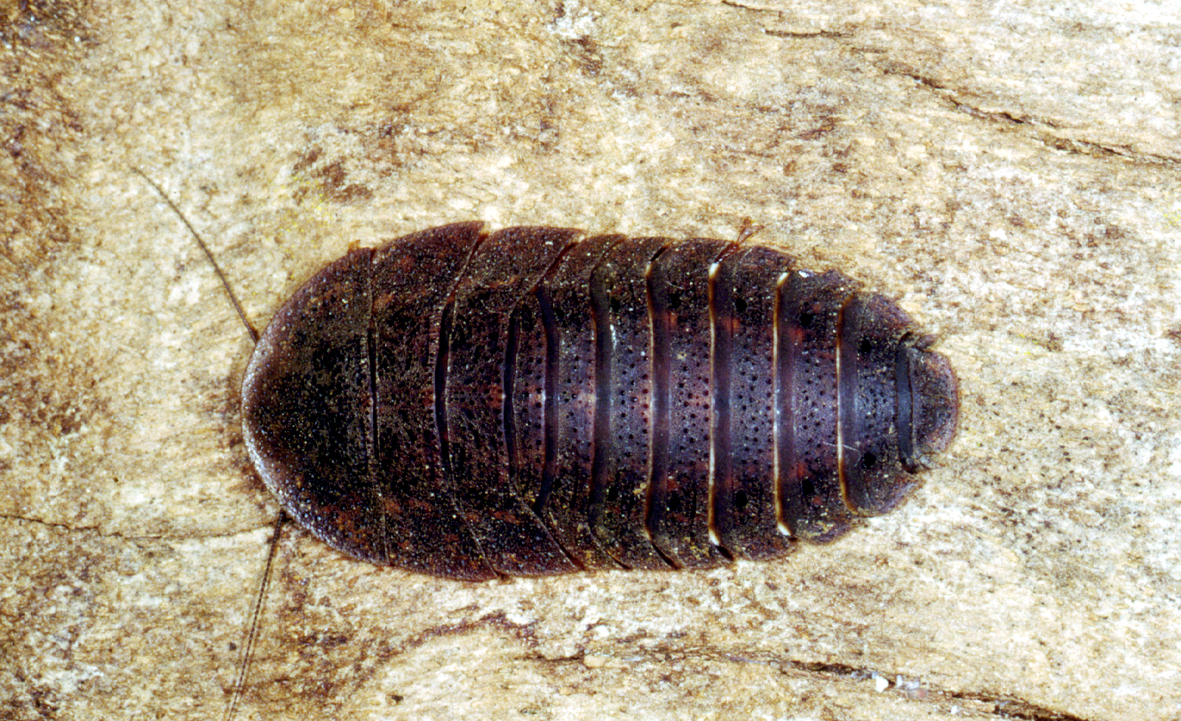

Scientific classification
- Domain: Eukaryota
- Kingdom: Animalia
- Phylum: Arthropoda
- Class: Insecta
- Order: Blattodea
- Family: Blaberidae
- Genus: Laxta
- Species: L. friedmani

Binomial name
- Laxta friedmani Roth, 1992

= Laxta friedmani =

Species of cockroach

Laxta friedmani, the flat cockroach, is a species of Blaberidae occurring in Australia. The habitat is under loose back of eucalyptus trees, and fallen leaf litter on the ground. Length is up to 25 mm, a flattened creature, resembling a trilobite, sometimes found in small groups. Females are wingless, adult males with wings.
