= Simandoa conserfariam =

Simandoa cave roach

Scientific classification
- Kingdom: Animalia
- Phylum: Arthropoda
- Clade: Pancrustacea
- Class: Insecta
- Order: Blattodea
- Family: Blaberidae
- Genus: Simandoa
- Species: S. conserfariam

Binomial name
- Simandoa conserfariam (Roth, 2004)

Species of cockroach

Simandoa conserfariam, also known as the Simandoa cave roach or Extinct in the Wild Roach, is a species of ovoviviparous, blaberid African cockroach that is potentially extinct-in-the-wild due to human encroachment, industrial damage and pollution in their native range caused by bauxite and iron ore mining. This species was first described in 2004 by Louis Roth and Piotr Naskrecki. Before their cave was heavily mined, biological surveys were conducted by Conservation International and specimens were collected in the late 1990s and early 2000s, with the species having been available to own and breed in captivity ever since then. Generally kept as a pet by insect hobbyists, it is not considered completely extinct. The only known habitat of S. conserfariam was a single cave in the Simandou region of Guinea, West Africa, where it lived on bat guano accumulating on the cave floor. The species' lone cave of habitation was reportedly destroyed, not long after its discovery, by bauxite mining operations. Individuals can be recognized by their unique coloring across their head and body regions, featuring yellow striping and bands.

Uniquely, amongst other troglobites (obligate cave-dwellers or subterranean species), the Simandoa cave roach does not possess reduced eye or wing size.
