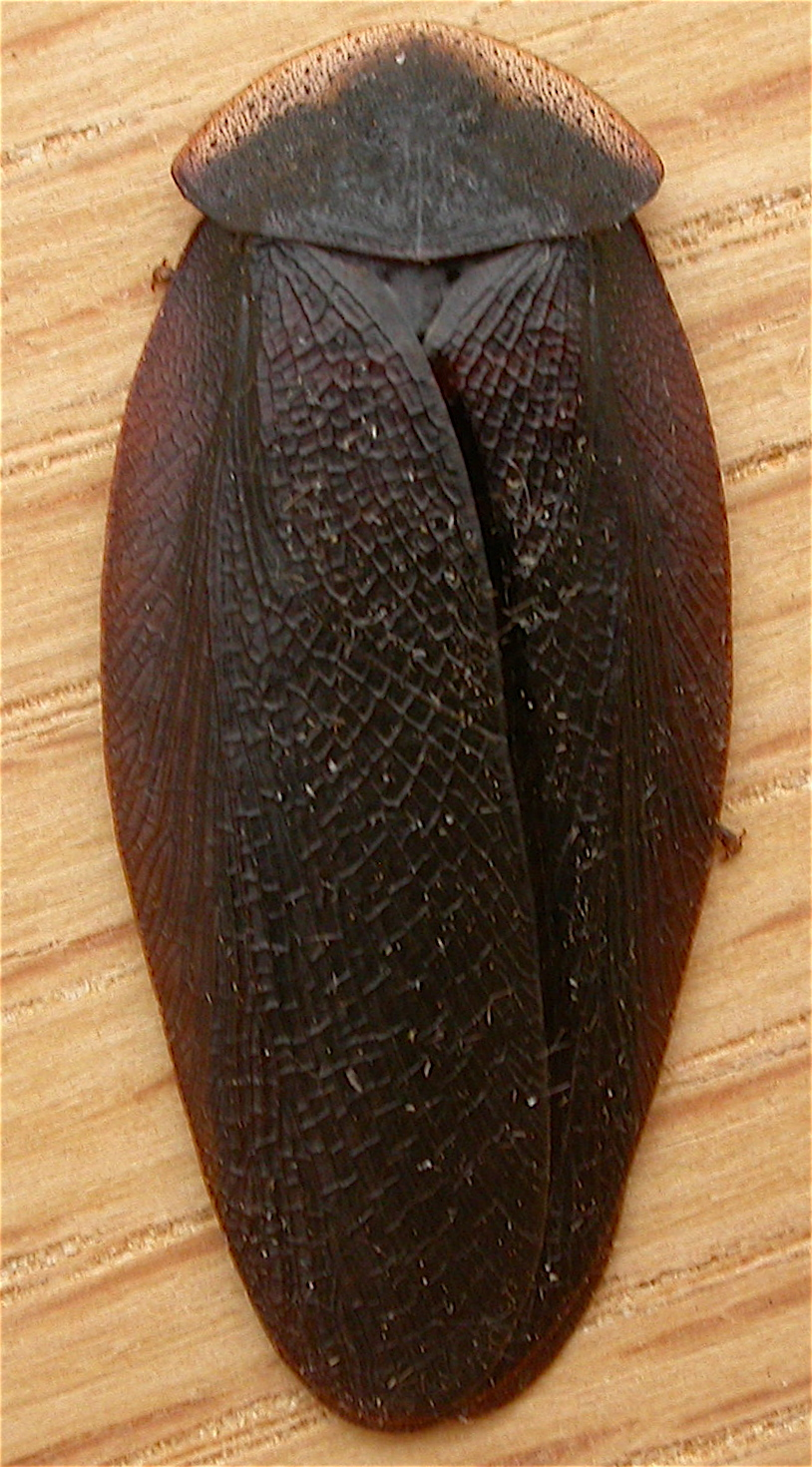
- Male

Scientific classification
- Kingdom: Animalia
- Phylum: Arthropoda
- Clade: Pancrustacea
- Class: Insecta
- Order: Blattodea
- Family: Blaberidae
- Genus: Laxta
- Species: L. granicollis

Binomial name
- Laxta granicollis (Saussure, 1862)

= Laxta granicollis =

Species of cockroach

Laxta granicollis, the bark cockroach, is a species of Blaberidae that occurs in Australia. The female of this species lacks wings while the male is winged.
