= Thorax porcellana =

Scientific classification
- Kingdom: Animalia
- Phylum: Arthropoda
- Clade: Pancrustacea
- Class: Insecta
- Order: Blattodea
- Family: Blaberidae
- Subfamily: Epilamprinae
- Tribe: Thoracini
- Genus: Thorax
- Species: T. porcellana

Binomial name
- Thorax porcellana (Saussure, 1862)

Synonyms
- Paraphoraspis notata Brunner von Wattenwyl, 1865

Species of cockroach

Thorax porcellana Saussure is a species of epilamprid cockroach occurring in Sri Lanka and India. Both sexes are fully winged, but only the male takes flight, and then rarely and on short flights.

Louis M. Roth speculated in 1981 that the arched tegmina found in Phoraspis and Thorax were similar to that of Phlebonotus pallens and would suggest similar maternal care. The Indian entomologist S. Bhoopathy confirmed in 1998 that this ovoviviparous species carries some 30-40 hatchling nymphs for their first two instars in a special recess under the domed forewings on the dorsum of the mother. During their stay of about 7 weeks they drink a pinkish liquid secreted from between the tergites of their mother’s abdomen. They also use their relatively long, sharp, mandibular tooth-like processes to pierce the mother’s cuticle and feed directly on her haemolymph. These 'teeth' are lost after two instars when there is no longer a close association with the mother.

"Immediately after hatching, the first instar nymphs crawled over the abdomen of the mother. The upper surface of her abdomen became markedly depressed into a fairly tight spacious trough or chamber with its sides raised. As the nymphs crawled over her body, she raised up her tegmina, which were large, tough, and dome-shaped, and all the nymphs were accommodated compactly; the tegmina were placed in position so as to conceal all the nymphs and to afford perfect protection."

— Bhoopathy 1998

.

Parental care among cockroaches, where offspring are fed on bodily secretions, is not rare, and has been recorded in Perisphaerus, Trichoblatta, Pseudophoraspis, Phlebonotus, Gromphadorhina, Solganea, Cryptocercus and Blattella, whereas biparental care is found only in wood-eating cockroaches - wood is low in nutrients and is made assimilable by micro-organisms in the adult gut.

== Synonyms ==
- Paraphoraspis notata Brunner von Wattenwyl, 1865

== Citations ==
- Saussure. 1862. 'Rev. Mag. Zool.' 2(14):228
