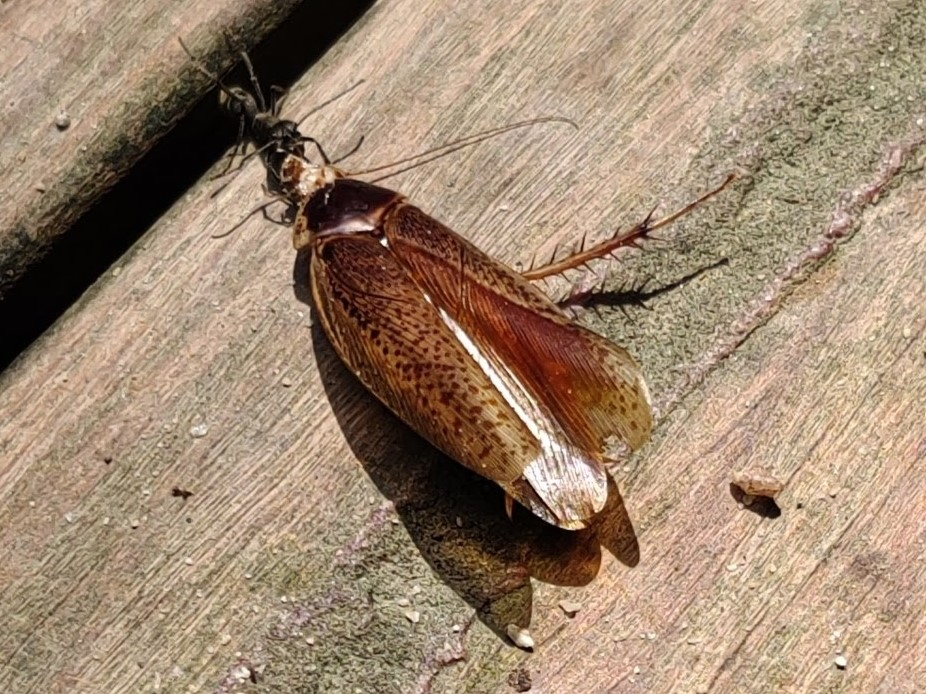

Scientific classification
- Kingdom: Animalia
- Phylum: Arthropoda
- Clade: Pancrustacea
- Class: Insecta
- Order: Blattodea
- Family: Blaberidae
- Subfamily: Calolamprodinae
- Genus: Calolamprodes; Bey-Bienko, 1969

= Calolamprodes =

Genus of cockroaches

Calolamprodes is a genus of Asian cockroaches in the family Blaberidae and the monotypic subfamily Calolamprodinae Wang & Wang, 2023, erected by G.Y. Bey-Bienko in 1969. Species have been recorded from India, China and Indochina.

== Species ==
The Cockroach Species File includes 2 subgenera:

Calolamprodes (Brachycalolamprodes) Anisyutkin, 1999

1. Calolamprodes gorochovi Anisyutkin, 1999 (Vietnam)

Calolamprodes (Calolamprodes) Bey-Bienko, 1969

1. Calolamprodes beybienkoi Anisyutkin, 2006
2. Calolamprodes characterosa (Walker, 1868)
3. Calolamprodes elephan Anisyutkin, 2006
4. Calolamprodes formosus Anisyutkin, 2006
5. Calolamprodes khmericus Anisyutkin, 2006
6. Calolamprodes laevis (Brunner von Wattenwyl, 1893) - type species (as Epilampra laevis Brunner von Wattenwyl)
7. Calolamprodes thailandensis Anisyutkin, 1999
