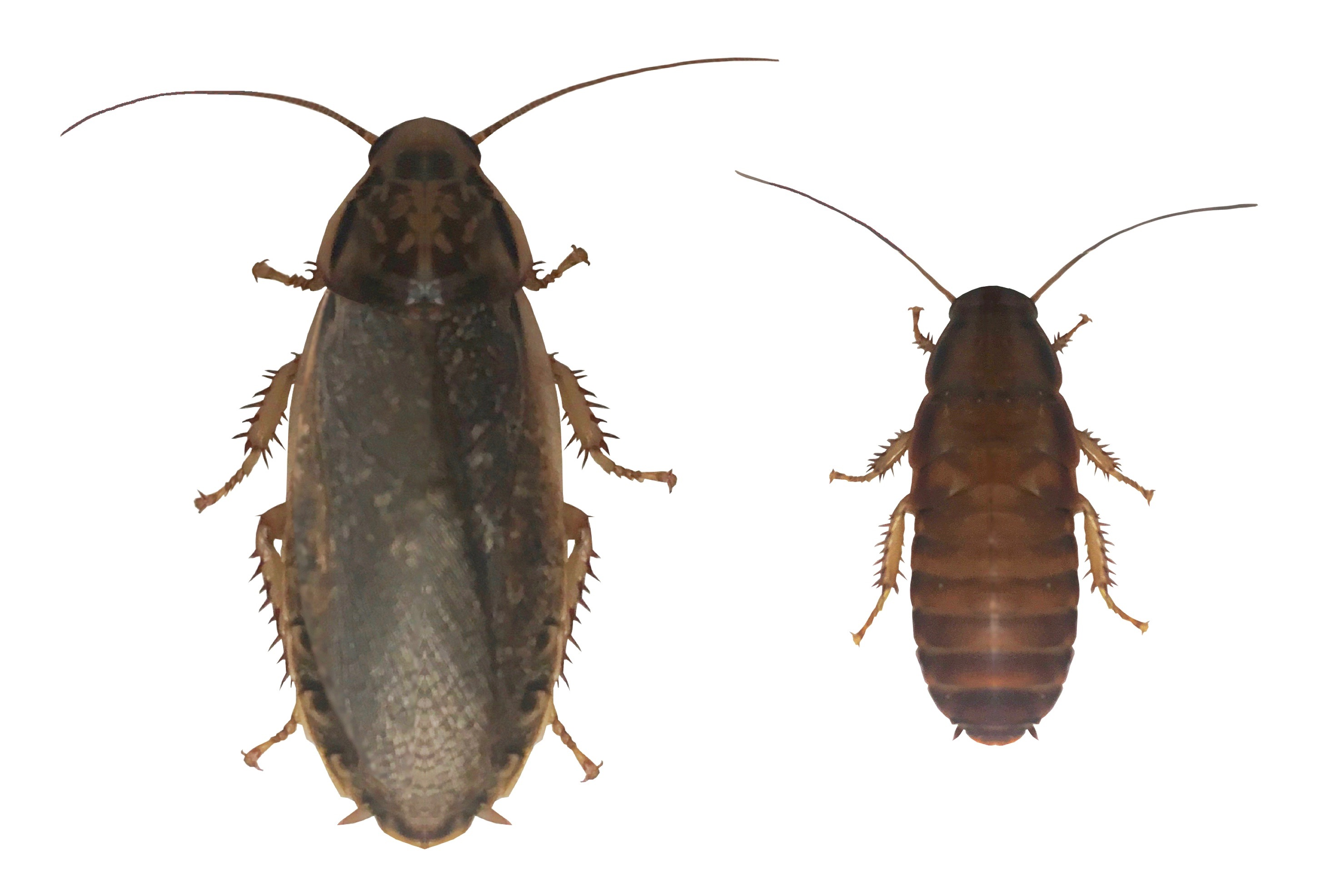
- Adult alate female (left) and male (right), dorsal perspective

Scientific classification
- Kingdom: Animalia
- Phylum: Arthropoda
- Clade: Pancrustacea
- Class: Insecta
- Order: Blattodea
- Family: Blaberidae
- Subfamily: Oxyhaloinae
- Tribe: Nauphoetini
- Genus: Nauphoeta; Burmeister, 1838
- Species: N. cinerea

Binomial name
- Nauphoeta cinerea (Olivier, 1789)
- Native (NE Africa) and introduced (elsewhere) distribution

Synonyms
- Blatta cinerea Olivier, 1789; Blatta elegans Eschscholtz, 1822; Blatta gallica Fabricius, 1793; Nauphoeta bivittata Burmeister, 1838; Nauphoeta grisea Burmeister, 1838

= Nauphoeta =

Species of cockroach

Nauphoeta cinerea, the speckled cockroach, lobster cockroach, or (small) cinereous cockroach, is a species of cockroach in the family Blaberidae. It is the sole species in the genus Nauphoeta.

== Taxonomy ==
This species was originally described by French entomologist Guillaume-Antoine Olivier in 1789 as Blatta cinerea. In 1838 Hermann Burmeister established a new genus for this species, Nauphoeta, giving it the current binomial name Nauphoeta cinerea. It is the sole species in this genus.

== Morphology ==
Nauphoeta cinerea is mottled brown, alate at maturity, and can reach up to 30 mm in length.

== Distribution ==
Nauphoeta cinerea is originally from north-eastern Africa, within Egypt, Eritrea, Libya, and Sudan. However, due to its association with humans, especially a tendency to stow away on ships, this species has achieved an invasive circumtropical distribution that includes parts of Madagascar, Thailand, the Philippines, Indonesia, Australia, Hawaii (United States), Mexico, Cuba, the Galapagos Islands (Ecuador), and Brazil.

== Reproduction ==
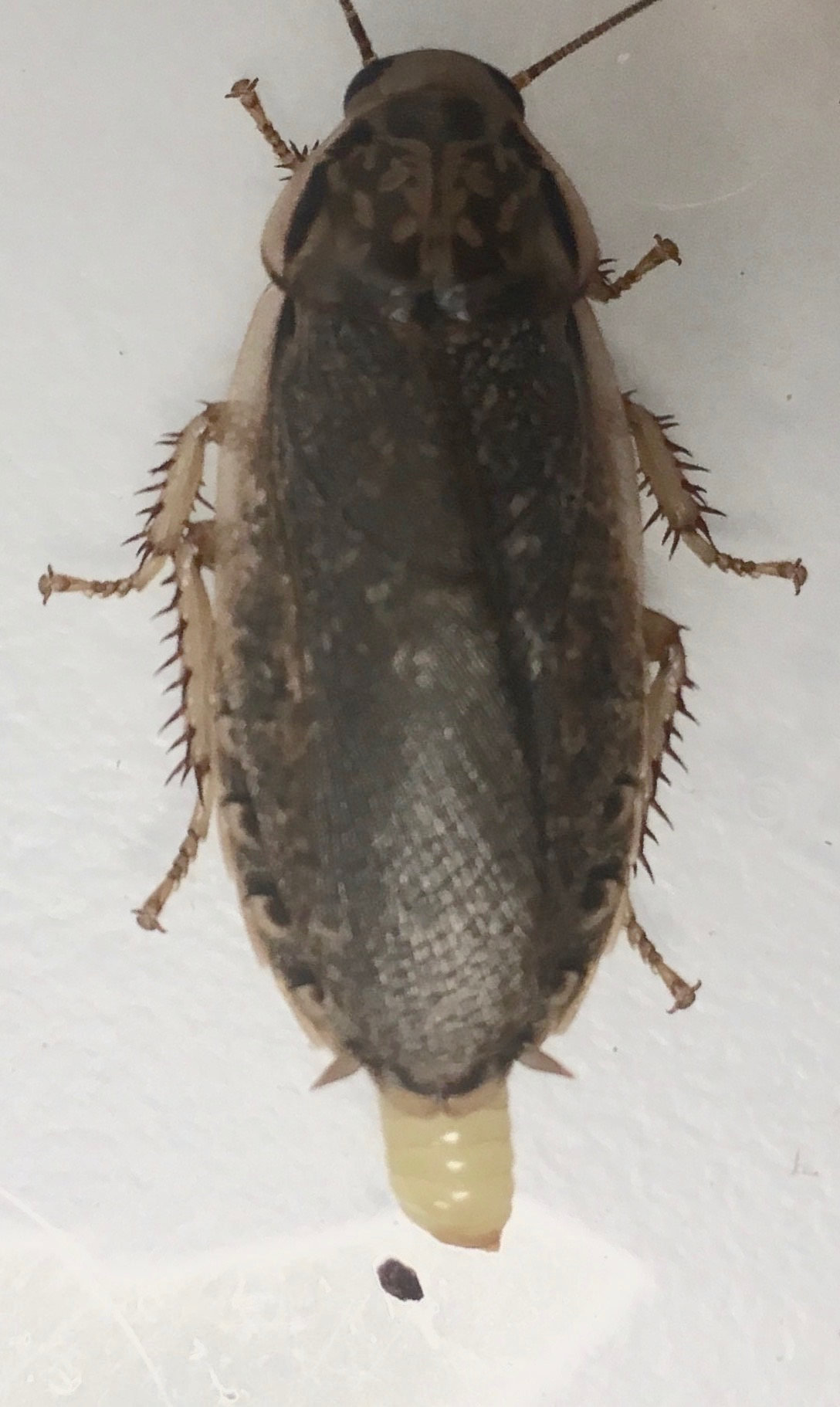
Female Nauphoeta cinerea with oothecium partially extruded

=== General characteristics ===
A female can produce around six broods in a lifetime, with each ootheca taking around 36 days to incubate in the brood sac, and each consisting of an average of 33 eggs. This species is falsely ovoviviparous; the female extrudes the ootheca from its brood sac but does not deposit it. Young emerge from the ootheca while it is still carried by the mother, eat their embryonic membranes and the ootheca, and cling to the mother for approximately an hour before departing. On average, males take 72 days and seven moults to develop to maturity, and live for 365 days, whereas females take 85 days and eight moults to develop, and live for 344 days.

=== Facultative parthenogenesis ===
Nauphoeta cinerea can reproduce by facultative parthenogenesis, that is, some are capable of switching from a sexual mode of reproduction to an asexual mode when isolated from males. However, fitness of parthenogenetically reproducing females is significantly lower than fitness of sexually reproducing females. Tenfold fewer offspring are produced by parthenogenesis due to decreases in both the number of offspring per clutch and the number of clutches produced. Parthenogenetic offspring are less viable than sexually produced offspring even in the benign conditions of the laboratory. Development of parthenogens to adulthood is slower. Fewer parthenogens survive to adulthood and the adult lifespan of parthenogens is reduced. These findings suggest that there are specific constraints in switching from a meiotic mode of reproduction requiring fertilization to a parthenogenetic mode in which zygotes develop in the absence of fertilization.

== Stridulation ==
Both sexes can produce chirps as distress calls at slightly less than the volume of a typical alarm clock (around 60 decibels) by rubbing their pronotum against the striae of their front wings. Males also stridulate for courtship, though usually only when all other tactics have failed. Males have also been observed stridulating to one another in the absence of females, one of many examples of same-sex sexual behavior in cockroaches. In courtship, the chirps are combined into "sentences" that may be up to three minutes long.

== Relationship with humans ==
This species breeds readily in captivity and as such, it is often used as livefood for other captive invertebrates such as tarantulas and praying mantids, as well as smaller lizards.

It is also sometimes used as a laboratory model for research purposes.

Researchers have found they can produce a palatable, high-protein bread for human consumption by substituting flour made from the cinereous cockroach in place of a portion of wheat flour. The researchers reported that individuals tasting bread they made with 10% cinerea cockroach flour indicated the flavor change was "almost imperceptible." The advantages of human consumption of flour made from the cinerea cockroach are said to include reduced water consumption and reduced greenhouse gas emissions from farming, compared to raising cattle as a protein source.
