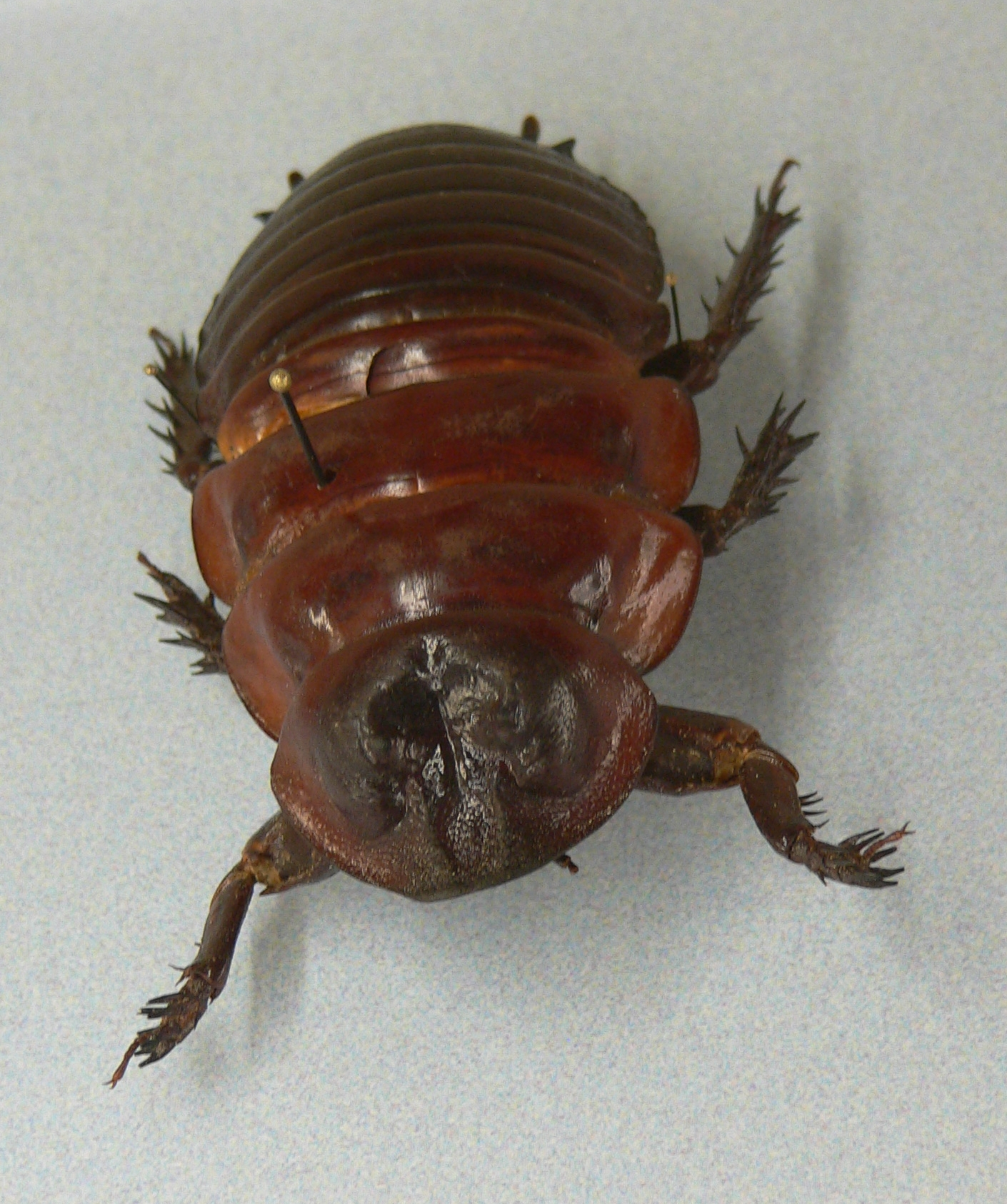

Scientific classification
- Kingdom: Animalia
- Phylum: Arthropoda
- Clade: Pancrustacea
- Class: Insecta
- Order: Blattodea
- Family: Blaberidae
- Genus: Macropanesthia
- Species: M. rhinoceros

Binomial name
- Macropanesthia rhinoceros Saussure, 1895

= Giant burrowing cockroach =

Species of cockroach

The giant burrowing cockroach (Macropanesthia rhinoceros), also known as the rhinoceros cockroach and Queensland giant cockroach, is a large cockroach native to Australia, found mostly tropical and subtropical parts of Queensland. They are the world's heaviest species of cockroach and can weigh up to 30-35 grams and measure up to 7.5-8 cm (3.1 in) in length. It is a member of the family Blaberidae, which contains hundreds of species. It is part of the blaberid subfamily Geoscapheinae. It is prominent in the wild and can also be sold and kept as a pet.

Unlike some other cockroaches, the giant burrowing cockroach does not have wings and is not considered a pest. This species plays a vital part in the ecosystem by consuming dead leaves, eucalyptus in particular, and recycling other matter. They may burrow down in soil to a depth of about 1 m (3 ft 3 in), where they make permanent homes and feed on collected dry leaf litter. The giant burrowing cockroach is the only cockroach in the world known to have permanent burrows in the soil. The species play an important ecological role in that it contributes to the recycling of nutrients in the wild.

The cockroach is popular in Brisbane and is frequently sold as a pet.

== Description ==
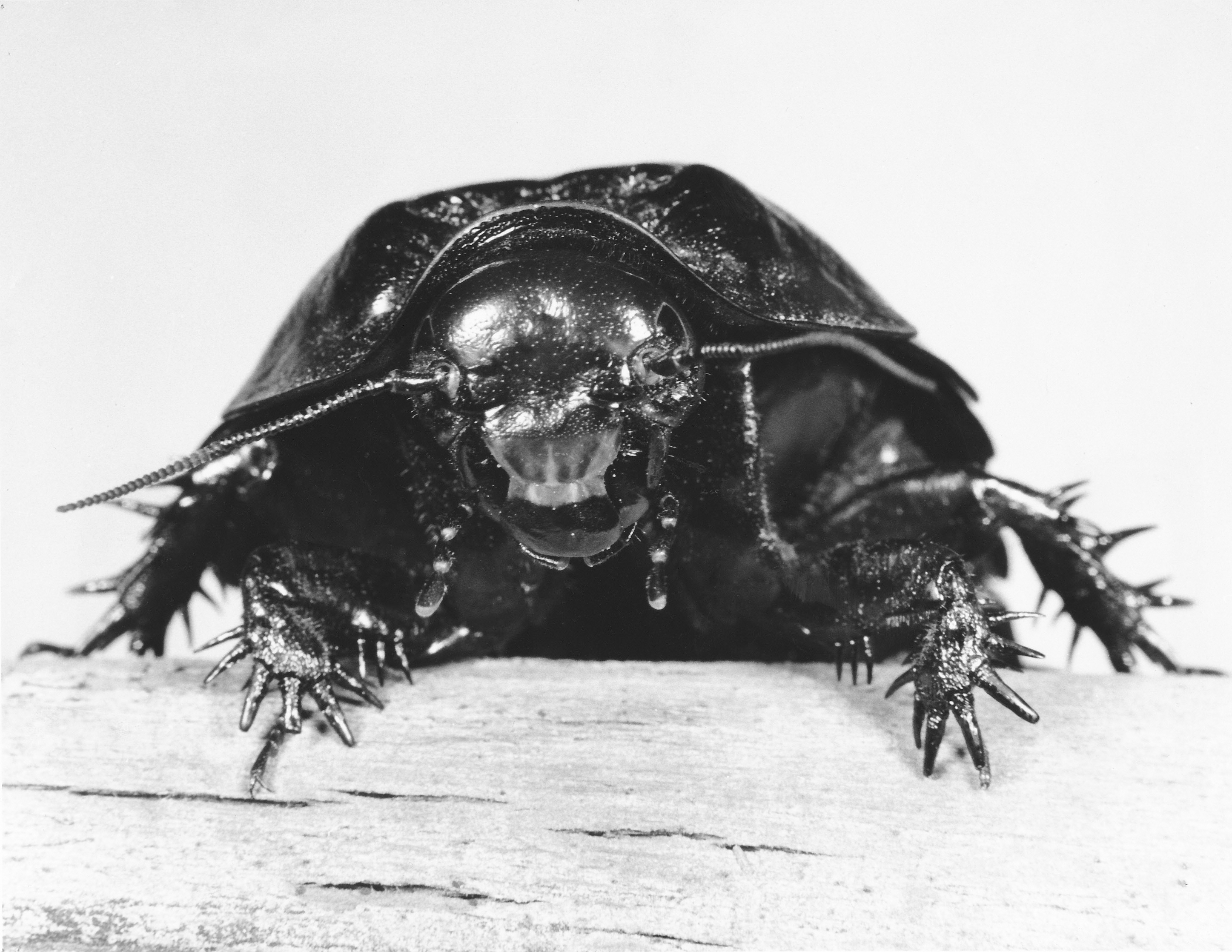
A giant burrowing cockroach

The giant burrowing cockroach is identifiable by its large size and weight. An adult can reach over 60 mm and up to 75–80 mm, and can weigh up to 30-35 grams. The pronotum is a prominent plate-like structure that covers the first segment of the thorax, has short tubercles at the sides, and can exceed 15 mm. Their pronotum assists with digging, acting as a shovel while its abdomen rests on the ground. The cockroach use their spiny tibiae in order to dig and burrow into the ground. The giant burrowing cockroach is well adapted for burrowing and digging with large back legs and a strong body armour, which offers protection from predators. It is one of few native Australian cockroaches without wings, with a concurrent lack of mobility. It is nocturnal.

Adult males and females can be differentiated by the size of the "scoop" on the pronotum, which covers the head; with the male having a much more pronounced scoop. They grow by moulting several times before reaching full size. When a cockroach moults, it will appear pure white except for the eyes. Individuals have lifespans up to ten years in captivity. Adult males are more commonly-encountered than females.

As in other hemimetabolous insects, the immature stages of the giant burrowing cockroaches are referred to as nymphs. Nymphs are creamy white when born, but soon develop a reddish brown colour. Both adult females and males are dark brown. Nymphs remain with their mothers for five to seven months, and she provides food and cares for them.

== Distribution and habitat ==
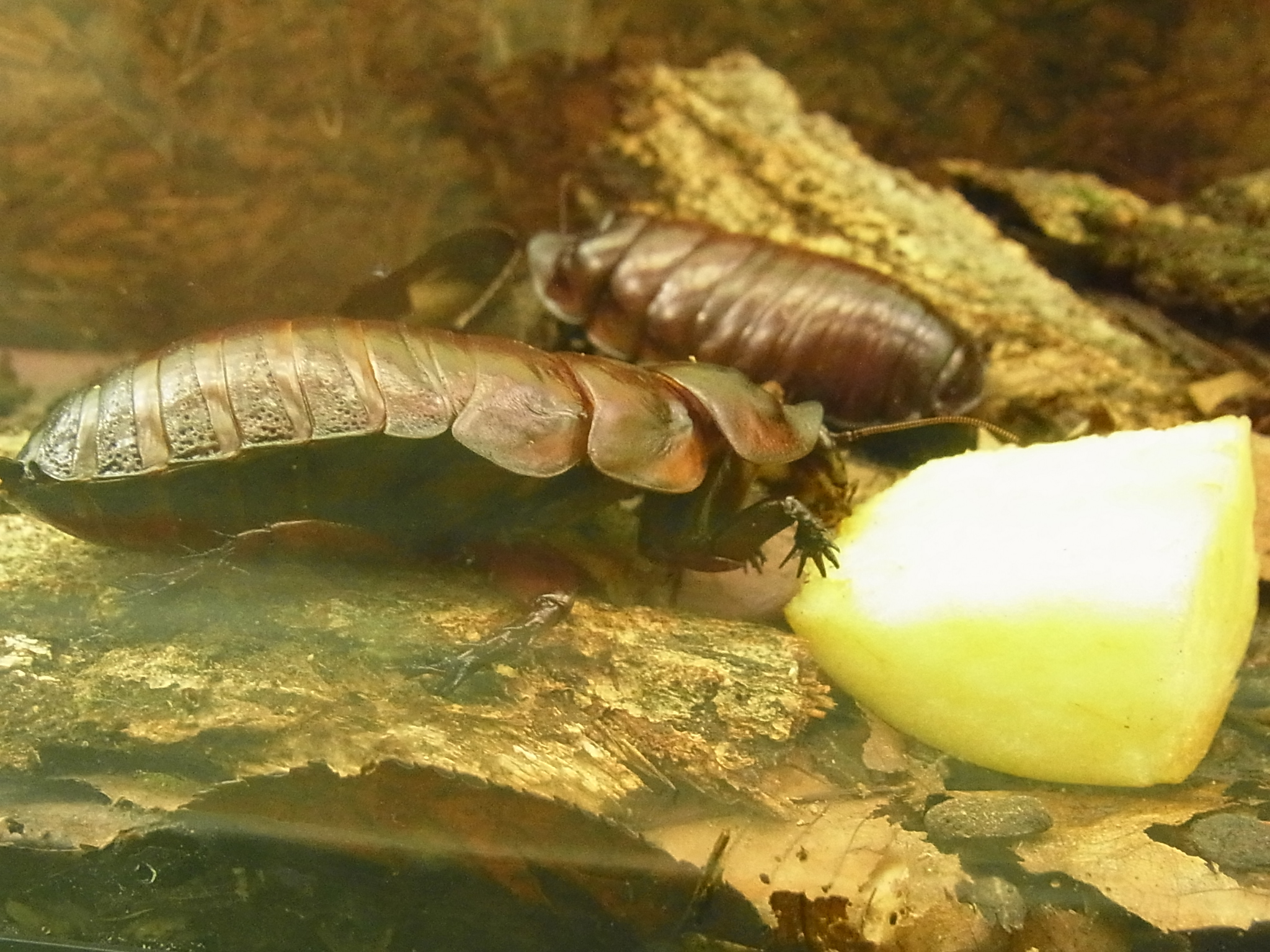
Macropanesthia rhinoceros in captivity

The giant burrowing cockroach species are mostly found in Queensland, Australia. It is commonly found along the coastal stretch between Rockhampton and Cooktown. The cockroach can also be located on the islands of the Whitsundays.

The species build burrows that can stretch up to one metre underground, which is where it stores food and lives permanently. Burrow depth appears to change depending on soil type, with burrows ranging from approximately 10 cm underground to 100 cm.

It is prevalent in dry Eucalyptus woodlands in the northeastern territory within Australia. There are 18 known geographical populations of the cockroach along subtropical Queensland. The cockroach has a wide geographical distribution in relation to other burrowing cockroach species. It is present across a one thousand kilometre range. The cockroach can be found in both dry and wet areas of Australia, including rainforests, woodlands and savannas. Common dry areas it inhabits include Maiden Springs, Boonderoo and Alpha. Common wet areas the cockroach is found in include Cooktown, Magnetic island and the Whitsundays. Locations that are in the mid-range between dry and wet regions where the cockroach is present include Coen, Rochford Scrub and Mount Garnet.

Populations of the cockroach can be geographically isolated due to unsuitable ground soil or by water. The species tends to prefer the drier savanna areas west of the Great Dividing Range.

The most common vegetation where the cockroach is found is Eucalyptus woodland and grass.

== Behaviour ==
The cockroach stays underground as it lives permanently in its burrows. The cockroach often surfaces during wet weather, with most activity coinciding with summer rains. During the dry season it remains in its burrows and feed on collected litter. It feeds mostly on dry, decomposing eucalyptus leaves. The cockroach composts the leaves in the burrow with some bark and dry grass.

Burrows are often composed of grass, tree root and leaves. The entrance to the cockroach burrows resembles a flattened semi-circle. Burrows can be identifiable when the cockroach has been active, yet are often covered by litter or collapsed. The size of the burrow entrance is approximately five centimetres wide and two centimetres high. Burrows often follow a path just below the soil surface for up to one metre, and occasionally descend downwards sharply. The burrows do not follow a pattern. The cockroaches occupy the end of the burrows, which is widened up to one metre wide to contain the collected litter. Other species of insects have been located within the burrows, including scarabs, aleculid beetles, silverfish, larvae of tenebrionids and caesmaking moths, as well as other species of cockroaches.

=== Social behaviour ===
The cockroach is generally solitary, yet young nymphs remain with mothers for several months after birth. The cockroach is active after sunrise, and may begin to burrow and dig. Males wander outside of burrows more than females do. Males tend to wander in search of a mate, whilst females collect litter to take back into their burrows.

Foraging is common with grown female cockroaches, and the cockroach can wander up to 50 cm from the entrance of the burrow to collect ground litter. It collects mostly dead leaves and use the mandibles to drag the litter back into their burrow.

Fighting is common amongst adult males, yet adult females with nymphs are also highly aggressive. Aggressiveness is associated with its solitary existence. Aggressive behaviour can include butting, barging and hissing which often results in a cockroach being knocked over. Males can fight at the entrances to burrows in order to prevent the other male cockroaches from entering the burrow. Whilst fighting, males use the front of the pronotum to force the intruder away. A hissing sound is produced when the giant burrowing cockroach fights another.

=== Sounds ===
The cockroach can emit a hissing sound during both reproduction and when threatened. The hissing sound is produced by the expulsion of air from the cockroach’s spiracles, which is an external respiratory opening on the abdomen.

== Biology ==
=== Reproduction ===
Reproductive behaviour between the cockroaches tends to occur at night time, and is based mostly on scent, taste and touch. The male cockroaches attempt to court the females with motions such as hissing, changing posture, motioning with antennas, grooming the female, and pushing the female with their body in an attempt to lift the female. It is unknown if female cockroaches engage in multiple matings and if so, if it occurs with different male cockroaches. Females can annually have up to thirty young at once.

The species is ovoviviparous meaning it has young by means of eggs which hatch internally in the parent. Unlike most insects, which lay eggs, the female Giant burrowing cockroach gives birth to her young, and protects her offspring in her underground alcove, providing them with leaf litter she gathers overnight. The cockroaches can live for up to 10 years. The species is often found with the mothers with the young together within the burrows, whereas the males are mostly absent from the burrows.

The parenting cycle of the giant burrowing cockroach can last up to six months, or until nymphs are capable to leave and construct their own burrows and fend for themselves. One brood of approximately thirty nymphs is produced each year, and tends to be in late spring after an incubation period of approximately three months. The cockroaches shed their outer skin approximately fourteen times in their life cycle. This skin is often ingested as it is nutritious.

Young nymphs are rarely found above ground, outside of the burrow. Nymphs grow at the same rate and once the nymphs leave the nest they live alone until they fully develop and become adults.

=== Obesity ===
Depending on the temperature, they perform different patterns of eating, carbon dioxide production, and metabolic rates. Macropanesthia rhinoceros can be diagnosed with obesity when there are no changes in its husbandry. When an individual lacks nutrition, they are susceptible to adopting a "thrifty phenotype", which prioritises fat storage over reproductive development to be able to handle dangerous environment conditions. In optimal environmental conditions, this thrifty phenotype has the potential to become maladaptive, thus causing excessive fat storage and metabolic disease. In the future, this may result in obesity or metabolic disease. Obesity can cause, "an atypical body conformation with narrow, elongated abdominal profiles compared to the wide, flat bodies of neighbouring conspecifics." In addition, this exposes a mushy and pale tissue between their abdominal sclerites.

== Relationship with humans ==
=== As pets ===
The cockroach is calm and easy to care for making it a common and popular pet. The species cannot move fast or fly. Its large size, sedentary behavioural lifestyle and limited husbandry needs contribute to the increase in popularity for the species as a pet both in Australia and internationally. They are clean, disease free, odourless, do not bite when handled and do not climb or fly.

Males can be aggressive towards other males meaning that a larger enclosure would be needed to house more than one cockroach at a time to avoid conflict. There should be more females than males in one enclosure as otherwise conflict may ensue between the males over the females.

Enclosures should not be kept in direct sunlight for extended periods of time.

The tank or terrarium should have clean, fine to medium grain river sand, with some being wet and the other end of the enclosure dry. The cockroach requires substrate to be up to 100mm deep, which the cockroach use with leaves and sticks to nest and burrow. The substrate is changed regularly after a few months, taking into account the size of the tank and the number of cockroaches present.

The giant burrowing cockroach has lived to a maximum of eight years in captivity.

Nymphs grow faster when in the wild in comparison to in captivity. Wild nymphs can reach the eighth instar in five months, yet there can be a large variation in growth rates with some nymphs taking up to a year to grow to the ninth instar. It has nine instar stages. Data from laboratories shows that it is a slow growing cockroach with varying growth rates.

The cockroach eats dried eucalyptus leaves and can also eat fruit and vegetables.

== Threats ==
The largest threat to the giant burrowing cockroach is habitat destruction. Their main habitat includes forests and land in northern Queensland, which has been cleared intensely from the year 2000.

Large centipedes find shelter in the burrows of the cockroaches and can prey on young nymphs. Large spiders also consume young nymphs. Neither spiders nor most centipedes are able to consume adults due to their outer shell, however fully grown Ethmostigmus rubripes would likely be capable of preying on the adult cockroaches.
