= Zetobora =

Scientific classification
- Kingdom: Animalia
- Phylum: Arthropoda
- Clade: Pancrustacea
- Class: Insecta
- Order: Blattodea
- Family: Blaberidae
- Subfamily: Zetoborinae
- Genus: Zetobora; Burmeister, 1838

Genus of insects

Zetobora is a genus of cockroaches belonging to the family Blaberidae.

The species of this genus are found in America.

Species:

- Zetobora aberrans Giglio-Tos, 1898
- Zetobora ampla (Hebard, 1921)

== Homonyms ==
Two other entomologists have used the name "Zetobora" for different genera of Blaberidae. Namely:

- Zetobora Brunner von Wattenwyl, 1865 accepted as Lanxoblatta Hebard, 1931
- Zetobora Saussure, 1862 accepted as Laxta Walker, 1868
