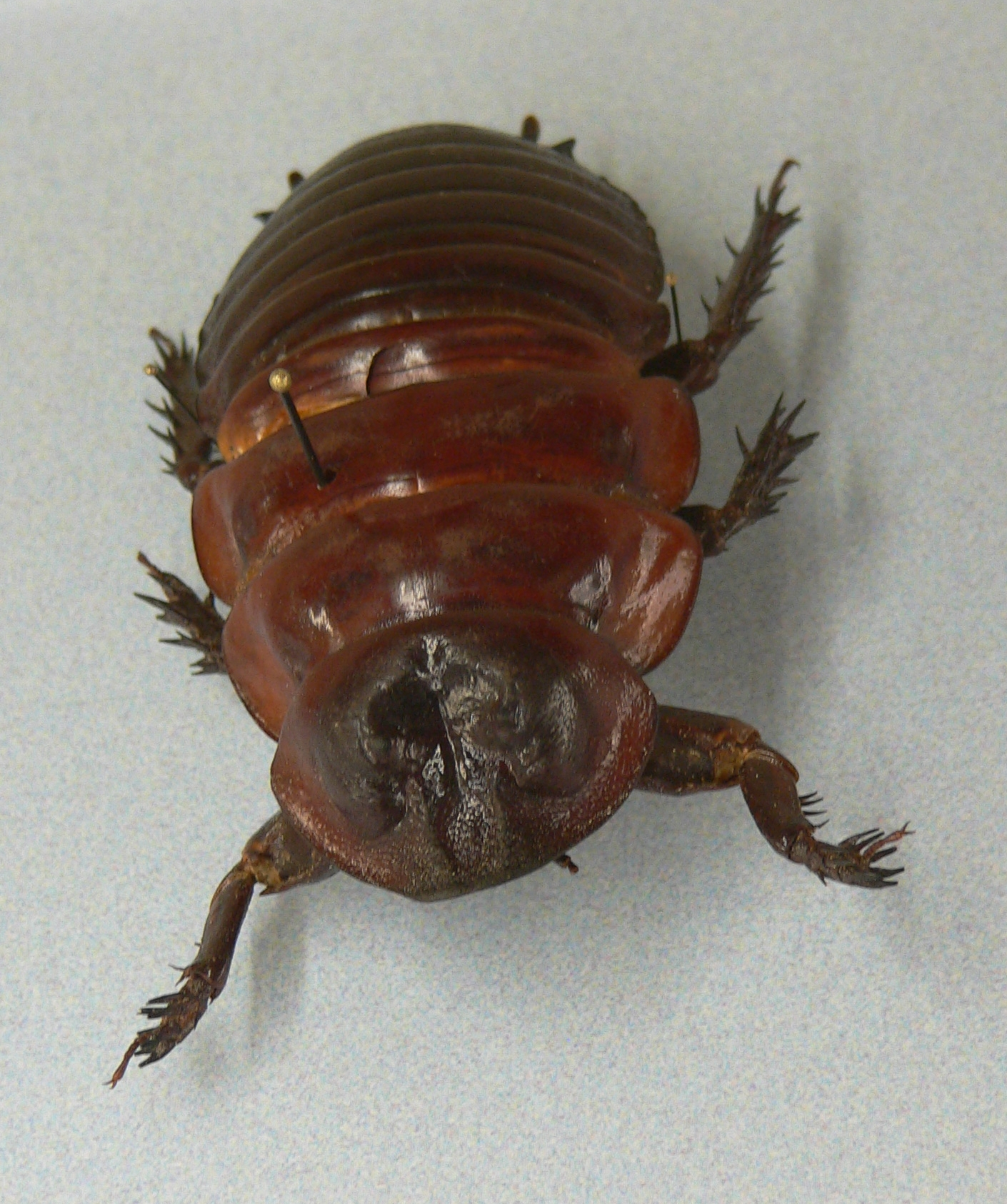
- Macropanesthia rhinoceros

Scientific classification
- Kingdom: Animalia
- Phylum: Arthropoda
- Class: Insecta
- Order: Blattodea
- Family: Blaberidae
- Subfamily: Geoscapheinae
- Genus: Macropanesthia; Saussure, 1895

Synonyms
- Hemipanesthia Saussure, 1895

= Macropanesthia =

Genus of cockroaches

Macropanesthia is a genus of cockroaches belonging to the family Blaberidae.

The species of this genus are found in Malesia to Australia.

== Species ==
The Cockroach Species File lists:

1. Macropanesthia ferrugineipes (Brunner von Wattenwyl, 1893)
2. Macropanesthia heppleorum Walker, Rugg & Rose, 1994
3. Macropanesthia intermorpha Rose, Walker & Woodward, 2014
4. Macropanesthia kinkuna Walker, Rugg & Rose, 1994
5. Macropanesthia kraussiana (Saussure, 1873)
6. Macropanesthia lineopunctata Rose, Walker & Woodward, 2014
7. Macropanesthia lithgowae Walker, Rugg & Rose, 1994
8. Macropanesthia mackerrasae Roth, 1977
9. Macropanesthia monteithi Roth, 1977
10. Macropanesthia mutica Rose, Walker & Woodward, 2014
11. Macropanesthia rhinoceros Saussure, 1895 - type species
12. Macropanesthia rothi Walker, Rugg & Rose, 1994
13. Macropanesthia saxicola Walker, Rugg & Rose, 1994
14. Macropanesthia spuritegmina Rose, Walker & Woodward, 2014
