= Simandoa =

Scientific classification
- Kingdom: Animalia
- Phylum: Arthropoda
- Clade: Pancrustacea
- Class: Insecta
- Order: Blattodea
- Family: Blaberidae
- Genus: Simandoa (Roth, 2004)

Species
- Simandoa conserfariam

Genus of cockroaches

Simandoa is a genus of cockroach that is presumably extinct in the wild, as its only currently identified species is Simandoa conserfariam.
