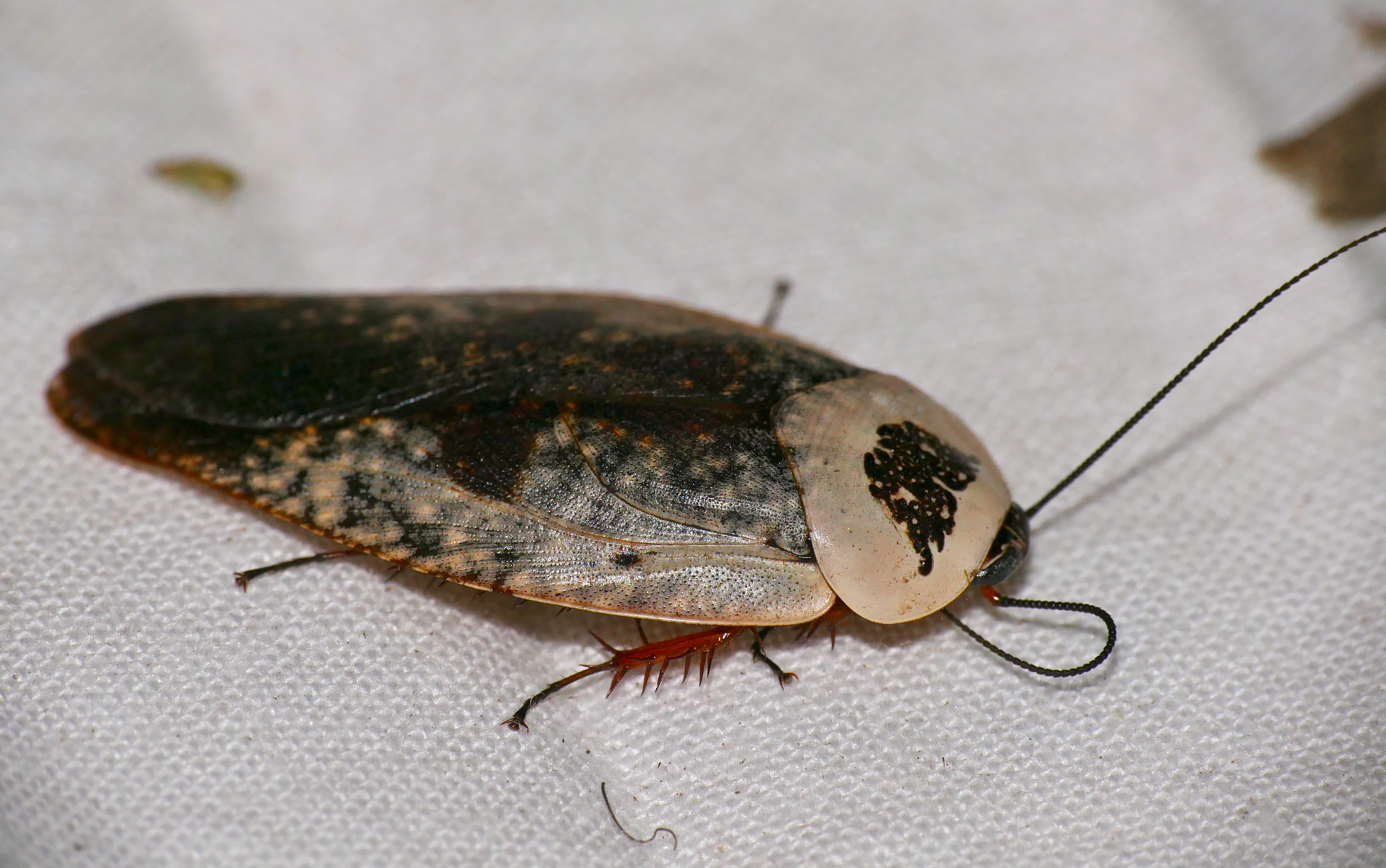
- Gyna caffrorum

Scientific classification
- Domain: Eukaryota
- Kingdom: Animalia
- Phylum: Arthropoda
- Class: Insecta
- Order: Blattodea
- Family: Blaberidae
- Subfamily: Gyninae
- Genus: Gyna; Brunner von Wattenwyl, 1865

Type species
- Gyna capucina Gerstaecker, 1883

Species
- See text

Synonyms
- Trichomera Kirby, 1896

= Gyna =

Genus of cockroaches

Gyna, also called porcelain roaches, are a genus of cockroaches native to Africa.

== Species ==
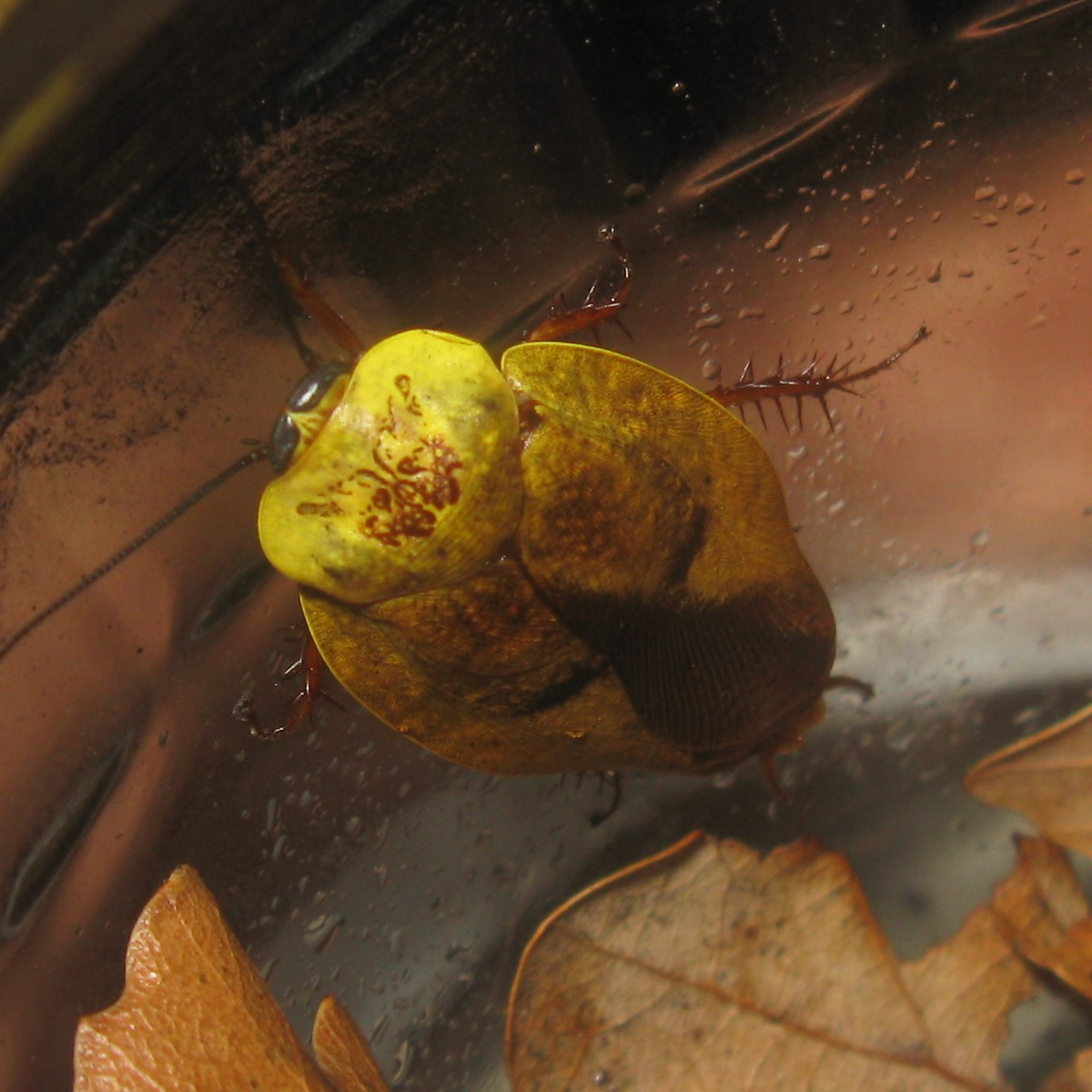
Gyna lurida 'Yellow'

There are 31 accepted species in this genus:

- Gyna aestuans Saussure, 1863
- Gyna aetola Shelford, 1909
- Gyna bisannulata Hanitsch, 1950
- Gyna caffrorum Stål, 1856
- Gyna capucina Gerstaecker, 1883
- Gyna castanea Shelford, 1909
- Gyna centurio Dohrn, 1888
- Gyna colini Rochebrune, 1883
- Gyna costalis Walker, 1868
- Gyna crassa Grandcolas, 1994
- Gyna cyclops Hanitsch, 1930
- Gyna fourcarti Grandcolas, 1994
- Gyna gloriosa Stål, 1855
- Gyna hyalina Shelford, 1909
- Gyna incisura Grandcolas, 1994
- Gyna incommoda Shelford, 1909
- Gyna jocosa Shelford, 1908
- Gyna kazungulana Giglio-Tos, 1907
- Gyna laticosta Walker, 1868
- Gyna lineata Grandcolas, 1994
- Gyna lurida Saussure, 1899
- Gyna maculipennis Schaum, 1853
- Gyna munda Grandcolas, 1994
- Gyna nigrifrons Bolívar, 1889
- Gyna oblonga Borg, 1902
- Gyna pomposa Brunner von Wattenwyl, 1865
- Gyna scheitzae Hanitsch, 1950
- Gyna scripta Giglio-Tos, 1916
- Gyna sculpturata Shelford, 1909
- Gyna scutelligera Walker, 1868
- Gyna spurcata Walker, 1868
