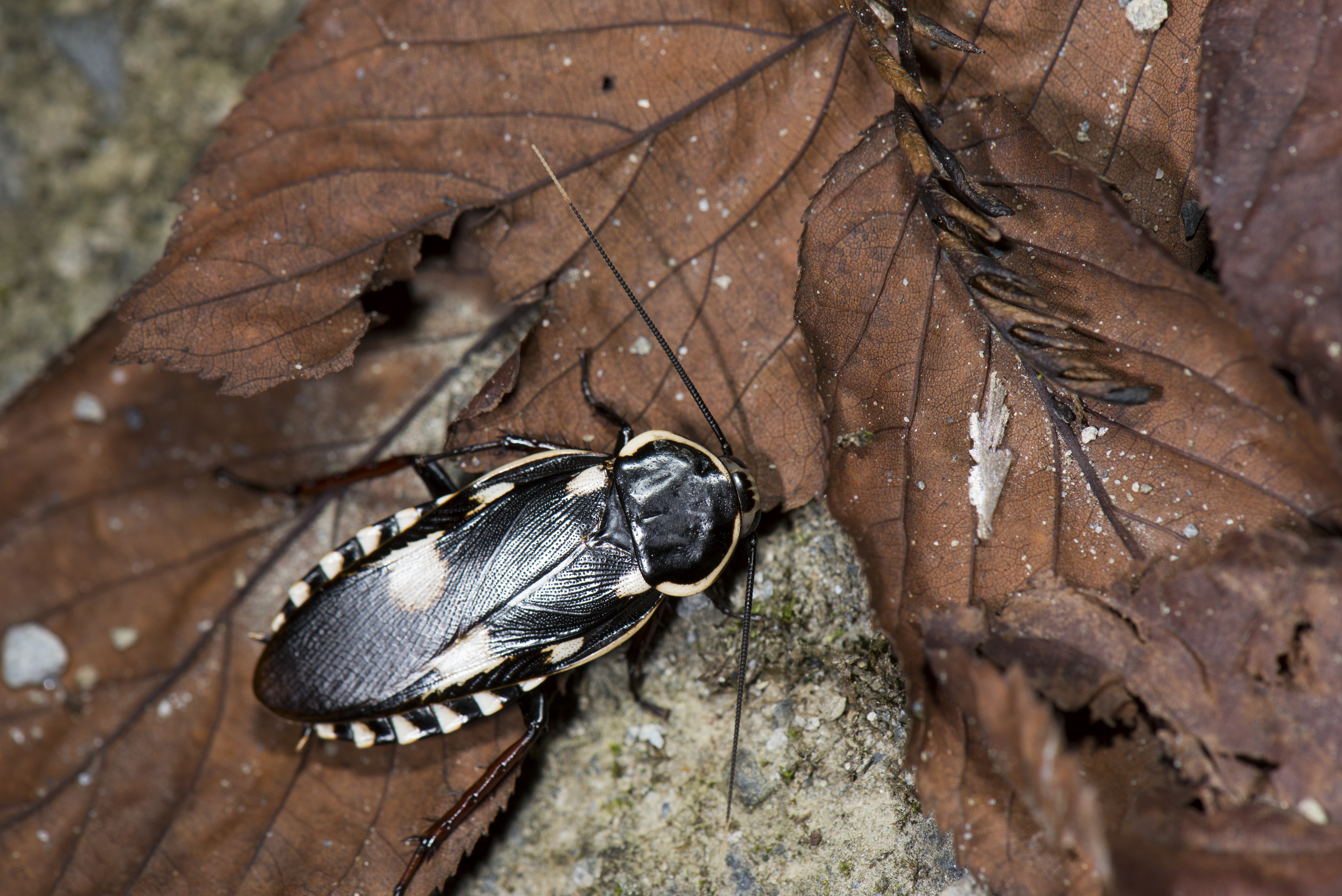
- Paranauphoeta formosana

Scientific classification
- Kingdom: Animalia
- Phylum: Arthropoda
- Clade: Pancrustacea
- Class: Insecta
- Order: Blattodea
- Family: Blaberidae
- Subfamily: Paranauphoetinae
- Genus: Paranauphoeta; Brunner von Wattenwyl, 1865

= Paranauphoeta =

Genus of cockroaches

External image
- Images at iNaturalist

Paranauphoeta is a genus of South East Asian cockroaches in the family Blaberidae and the monotypic subfamily Paranauphoetinae Rehn, 1951, erected by Carl Brunner von Wattenwyl in 1865. Species records are from India, China, Indochina, Malesia and New Guinea.

== Species ==
The Cockroach Species File lists:

1. Paranauphoeta adjuncta (Walker, 1868)
2. Paranauphoeta affinis Shelford, 1906
3. Paranauphoeta anulata Li & Wang, 2017
4. Paranauphoeta atra Shelford, 1906
5. Paranauphoeta basalis (Serville, 1838)
6. Paranauphoeta brachyptera Li & Wang, 2017
7. Paranauphoeta brunneri Shelford, 1907
8. Paranauphoeta circumdata (Haan, 1842) - type species (by subsequent designation of Blatta (Nauphoeta) circumdata Haan)
9. Paranauphoeta formosana Matsumura, 1913
10. Paranauphoeta indica Saussure & Zehntner, 1895
11. Paranauphoeta javanica Saussure, 1873
12. Paranauphoeta kirbyi Li & Wang, 2017
13. Paranauphoeta limbata Saussure, 1869
14. Paranauphoeta lineola Li & Wang, 2017
15. Paranauphoeta lyrata (Burmeister, 1838)
16. Paranauphoeta nigra Bey-Bienko, 1969
17. Paranauphoeta philippinica Karny, 1915
18. Paranauphoeta pullata Mavropulo, Anisyutkin, Zagoskin, Zagoskina, Lukyantsev & Mukha, 2015
19. Paranauphoeta rufipes Brunner von Wattenwyl, 1865
20. Paranauphoeta sinica Bey-Bienko, 1958
21. Paranauphoeta vicina Brunner von Wattenwyl, 1893
22. Paranauphoeta vietnamensis Anisyutkin, 2003
