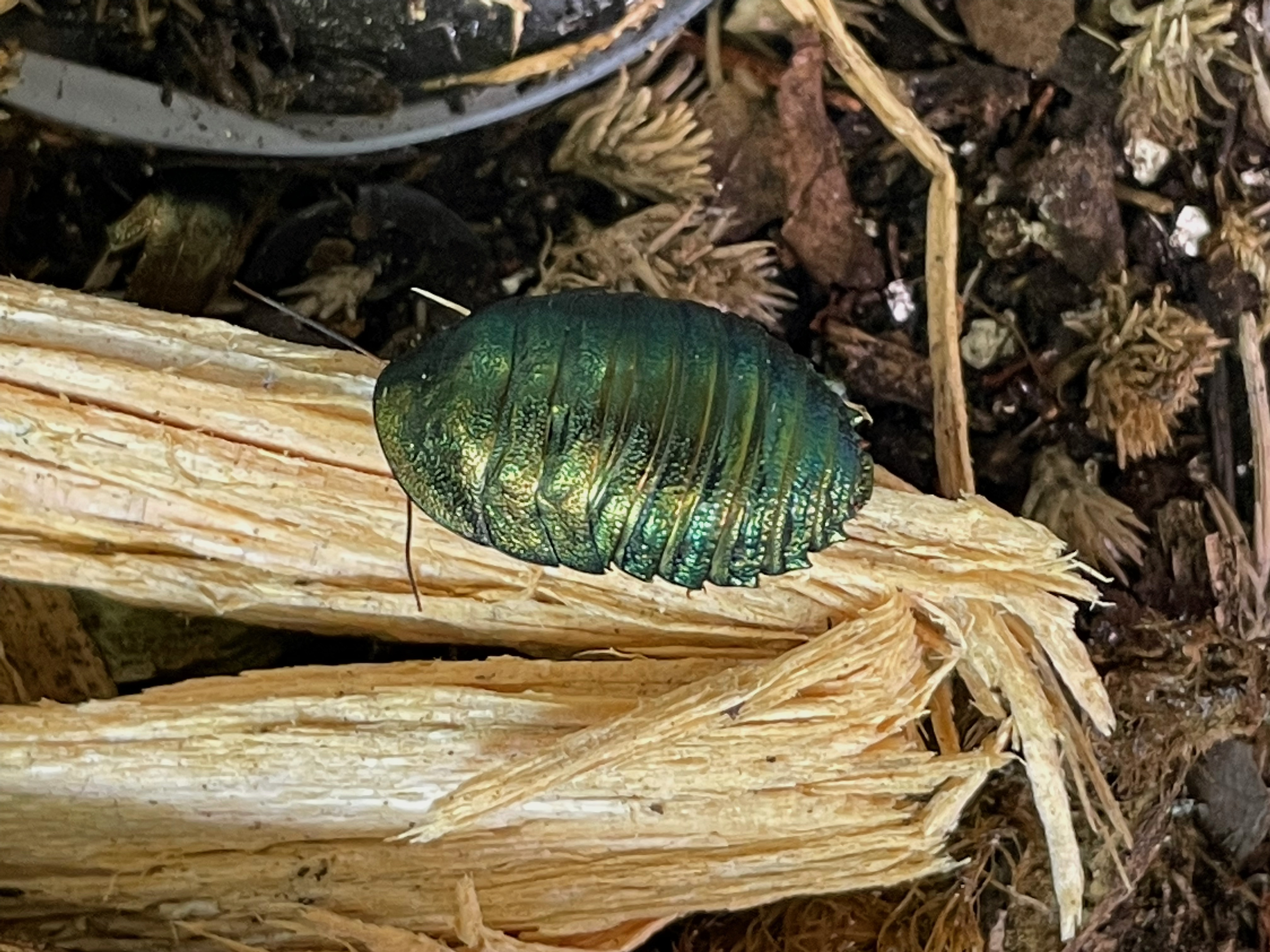

Scientific classification
- Kingdom: Animalia
- Phylum: Arthropoda
- Clade: Pancrustacea
- Class: Insecta
- Order: Blattodea
- Family: Blaberidae
- Subfamily: Perisphaerinae
- Genus: Pseudoglomeris
- Species: P. magnifica

Binomial name
- Pseudoglomeris magnifica (Shelford, 1907)

Synonyms
- Pseudoglomeris magnifica Shelford; Trichoblatta magnifica Shelford; Pseudoglomeris dubia Hanitsch

= Corydidarum magnifica =

Species of cockroach

Pseudoglomeris magnifica, previously known as Corydidarum magnifica and commonly known as the emerald cockroach, is a species of cockroach native to Vietnam and southern China, typically found under leaf litter or on tree bark.

== Description ==
The species grows up to 30 mm, with the females being larger and thicker than the males. The adult females also lack wings, which are only present on adult males. They exhibit metallic green, copper or even blue-ish coloration (varying from origin region).

P. magnifica sitting on a tree bark.

== Behaviour ==
Unlike most species of cockroaches, they are diurnal and arboreal, with the ability to climb smooth surfaces. After ecdysis, they do not consume their old exoskeleton.

The females gestate their young for up to 6 months.
