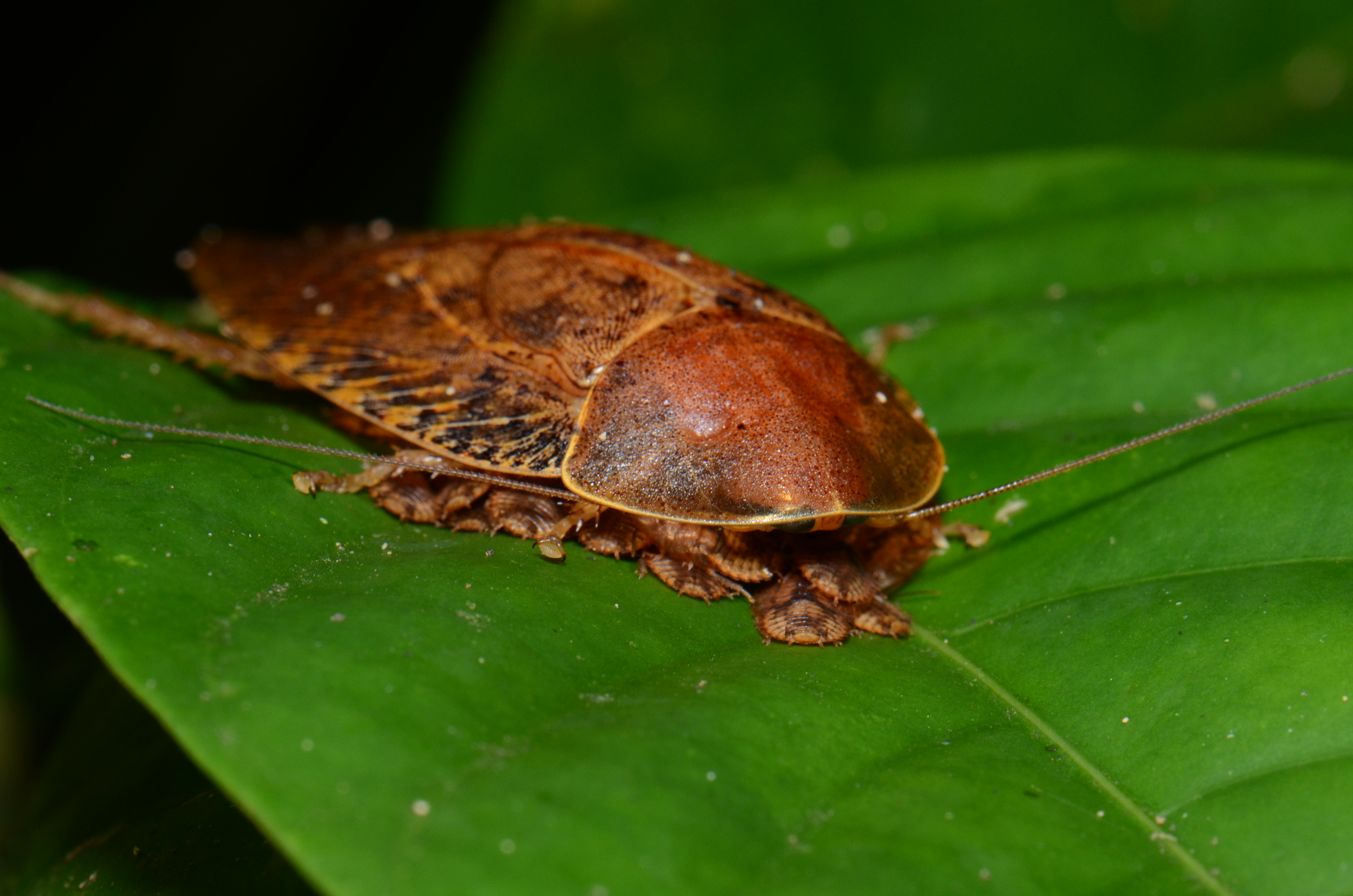
- Pseudophoraspis sp.

Scientific classification
- Kingdom: Animalia
- Phylum: Arthropoda
- Clade: Pancrustacea
- Class: Insecta
- Order: Blattodea
- Family: Blaberidae
- Subfamily: Epilamprinae
- Genus: Pseudophoraspis; Kirby, 1903

= Pseudophoraspis =

Genus of cockroaches

Pseudophoraspis is a genus of South-East Asian cockroaches, erected by William Forsell Kirby 1903.

== Species ==
1. Pseudophoraspis argillacea Anisyutkin, 1999
2. Pseudophoraspis buonluoiensis Anisyutkin, 1999
3. Pseudophoraspis clavellata Wang, Wu & Che, 2013
4. Pseudophoraspis congrua (Walker, 1868)
5. Pseudophoraspis doroshenkoi Anisyutkin, 2005
6. Pseudophoraspis fruhrstorferi Shelford, 1910
7. Pseudophoraspis gorochovi Anisyutkin, 1999
8. Pseudophoraspis grigorenkoi Anisyutkin, 1999
9. Pseudophoraspis incurvata Wang, Wu & Che, 2013
10. Pseudophoraspis kabakovi Anisyutkin, 1999
11. Pseudophoraspis lacrimans Hanitsch, 1933
12. Pseudophoraspis marginata Anisyutkin, 1999
13. Pseudophoraspis nebulosa (Burmeister, 1838)
14. Pseudophoraspis recurvata Wang, Wu & Che, 2013
15. Pseudophoraspis testudinaria Hanitsch, 1925
16. Pseudophoraspis tramlapensis Anisyutkin, 1999
17. Pseudophoraspis truncatulus Anisyutkin, 1999
18. Pseudophoraspis uniformis Hanitsch, 1933
