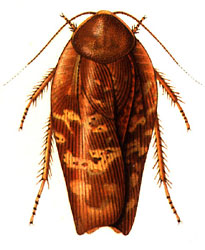
- Rhabdoblatta praecipua (Walker, 1868): type

Scientific classification
- Kingdom: Animalia
- Phylum: Arthropoda
- Clade: Pancrustacea
- Class: Insecta
- Order: Blattodea
- Family: Blaberidae
- Subfamily: Epilamprinae
- Genus: Rhabdoblatta; Kirby, 1903

Synonyms
- Epilampra Shelford, 1909 Heterolampra Kirby, 1903 Morphnodes Hebard, 1929

= Rhabdoblatta =

Genus of cockroaches

External image
- Images at iNaturalist

Rhabdoblatta is a genus of cockroaches in the subfamily Epilamprinae. Species have been recorded from Africa, East, Southeast and South Asia.

== Species ==
The Cockroach Species File lists the following species:

1. Rhabdoblatta abdominalis (Kirby, 1903)
2. Rhabdoblatta adjacens Anisyutkin, 2000
3. Rhabdoblatta albina (Saussure, 1895)
4. Rhabdoblatta alligata (Walker, 1868)
5. Rhabdoblatta annandalei (Shelford, 1909)
6. Rhabdoblatta antecedens Anisyutkin, 2000
7. Rhabdoblatta asymmetrica Bey-Bienko, 1968
8. Rhabdoblatta atra Bey-Bienko, 1970
9. Rhabdoblatta bazyluki Bey-Bienko, 1970
10. Rhabdoblatta belokobylskii Anisyutkin, 2005
11. Rhabdoblatta beybienkoi Anisyutkin, 2003
12. Rhabdoblatta bicolor Guo, Liu & Li, 2011
13. Rhabdoblatta bielawskii Bey-Bienko, 1970
14. Rhabdoblatta birmanica Princis, 1950
15. Rhabdoblatta buonluoiensis Anisyutkin, 2000
16. Rhabdoblatta camerunensis (Borg, 1902)
17. Rhabdoblatta catori (Hanitsch, 1931)
18. Rhabdoblatta chaulformis Yang, Wang, Zhou, Wang & Che, 2019
19. Rhabdoblatta chromatica Anisyutkin, 2000
20. Rhabdoblatta cincta (Brunner von Wattenwyl, 1865)
21. Rhabdoblatta circumdata (Hanitsch, 1915)
22. Rhabdoblatta communis (Hanitsch, 1928)
23. Rhabdoblatta curta (Walker, 1868)
24. Rhabdoblatta darevskii (Bey-Bienko, 1965)
25. Rhabdoblatta decorata Anisyutkin, 2000
26. Rhabdoblatta deflexa (Saussure, 1873)
27. Rhabdoblatta denticuligera Anisyutkin, 2000
28. Rhabdoblatta dilatata (Brunner von Wattenwyl, 1865)
29. Rhabdoblatta doleschali (Brunner von Wattenwyl, 1865)
30. Rhabdoblatta dytiscoides (Hanitsch, 1915)
31. Rhabdoblatta ecarinata Yang, Wang, Zhou, Wang & Che, 2019
32. Rhabdoblatta elegans Anisyutkin, 2000
33. Rhabdoblatta erubescens (Gerstaecker, 1883)
34. Rhabdoblatta everetti (Hanitsch, 1931)
35. Rhabdoblatta excellens Anisyutkin, 2000
36. Rhabdoblatta excelsa (Navás, 1904)
37. Rhabdoblatta eximia Anisyutkin, 2000
38. Rhabdoblatta exotica Anisyutkin, 2000
39. Rhabdoblatta extrema Anisyutkin, 2000
40. Rhabdoblatta ferruginosa (Stål, 1877)
41. Rhabdoblatta flavomarginata (Shelford, 1906)
42. Rhabdoblatta formosana (Shiraki, 1906)
43. Rhabdoblatta geminata (Brunner von Wattenwyl, 1898)
44. Rhabdoblatta gialaiensis Anisyutkin, 2000
45. Rhabdoblatta gjellerupi (Hanitsch, 1923)
46. Rhabdoblatta goliath (Shelford, 1906)
47. Rhabdoblatta gorochovi Anisyutkin, 2000
48. Rhabdoblatta guttigera (Shiraki, 1906)
49. Rhabdoblatta gyroflexa Yang, Wang, Zhou, Wang & Che, 2019
50. Rhabdoblatta humeralis (Shiraki, 1931)
51. Rhabdoblatta hybrida (Saussure, 1895)
52. Rhabdoblatta imitans (Brunner von Wattenwyl, 1893)
53. Rhabdoblatta immaculata (Kirby, 1903)
54. Rhabdoblatta imperatrix (Kirby, 1903)
55. Rhabdoblatta incisa Bey-Bienko, 1969
56. Rhabdoblatta inclarata (Walker, 1868)
57. Rhabdoblatta inconspicua (Brunner von Wattenwyl, 1865)
58. Rhabdoblatta insueta (Walker, 1868)
59. Rhabdoblatta intermedia (Hanitsch, 1925)
60. Rhabdoblatta javanica (Saussure, 1869)
61. Rhabdoblatta kabakovi Bey-Bienko, 1969
62. Rhabdoblatta karnyi (Shiraki, 1931)
63. Rhabdoblatta keraudreni (Le Guillou, 1841)
64. Rhabdoblatta klossi (Hanitsch, 1927)
65. Rhabdoblatta krasnovi (Bey-Bienko, 1969)
66. Rhabdoblatta kryzhanovskii Bey-Bienko, 1958
67. Rhabdoblatta laevicollis (Saussure, 1873)
68. Rhabdoblatta limbata (Hanitsch, 1923)
69. Rhabdoblatta lineaticollis (Bolívar, 1897)
70. Rhabdoblatta lugubrina (Stål, 1877)
71. Rhabdoblatta luteola Anisyutkin, 2000
72. Rhabdoblatta lutosa Anisyutkin, 2000
73. Rhabdoblatta luzonica (Bey-Bienko, 1941)
74. Rhabdoblatta lyncea (Gerstaecker, 1883)
75. Rhabdoblatta maculata Yang, Wang, Zhou, Wang & Che, 2019
76. Rhabdoblatta malagassa (Saussure & Zehntner, 1895)
77. Rhabdoblatta malcolmsmithi (Hanitsch, 1927)
78. Rhabdoblatta marginata Bey-Bienko, 1969
79. Rhabdoblatta marmorata (Brunner von Wattenwyl, 1893)
80. Rhabdoblatta mascifera Bey-Bienko, 1969
81. Rhabdoblatta melancholica (Bey-Bienko, 1954)
82. Rhabdoblatta melanosoma (Saussure, 1869)
83. Rhabdoblatta memnonia Anisyutkin, 2009
84. Rhabdoblatta mentawiensis (Hanitsch, 1928)
85. Rhabdoblatta mentiens Anisyutkin, 2000
86. Rhabdoblatta meticulosa (Stål, 1877)
87. Rhabdoblatta modica Anisyutkin, 2000
88. Rhabdoblatta modiglianii (Hanitsch, 1932)
89. Rhabdoblatta monochroma Anisyutkin, 2000
90. Rhabdoblatta monticola (Kirby, 1903)
91. Rhabdoblatta nigrovittata Bey-Bienko, 1954
92. Rhabdoblatta obtecta Hanitsch, 1915
93. Rhabdoblatta ocellata Princis, 1951
94. Rhabdoblatta omei Bey-Bienko, 1958
95. Rhabdoblatta orlovi Anisyutkin, 2000
96. Rhabdoblatta pallescens Anisyutkin, 2000
97. Rhabdoblatta pallida (Borg, 1902)
98. Rhabdoblatta pandens (Walker, 1868)
99. Rhabdoblatta papua (Saussure, 1895)
100. Rhabdoblatta paravicinii (Hanitsch, 1934)
101. Rhabdoblatta parva (Chopard, 1952)
102. Rhabdoblatta parvula Bey-Bienko, 1958
103. Rhabdoblatta pectinata (Saussure, 1869)
104. Rhabdoblatta pedisequa (Rehn, 1904)
105. Rhabdoblatta pendleburyi (Hanitsch, 1933)
106. Rhabdoblatta perplexa (Tepper, 1895)
107. Rhabdoblatta pisarskii Bey-Bienko, 1970
108. Rhabdoblatta plebeja (Stål, 1877)
109. Rhabdoblatta plena (Walker, 1868)
110. Rhabdoblatta pluriramosa (Karny, 1915)
111. Rhabdoblatta pondokensis Bruijning, 1948
112. Rhabdoblatta praecipua (Walker, 1868) - type species (as Epilampra praecipua Walker)
113. Rhabdoblatta princisi (Bey-Bienko, 1957)
114. Rhabdoblatta procera (Brunner von Wattenwyl, 1865)
115. Rhabdoblatta proximata (Bruijning, 1948)
116. Rhabdoblatta puncticollis (Walker, 1868)
117. Rhabdoblatta puncticulosa Anisyutkin, 2000
118. Rhabdoblatta punctipennis (Saussure, 1895)
119. Rhabdoblatta punctuata Anisyutkin, 2000
120. Rhabdoblatta punctulata (Saussure, 1891)
121. Rhabdoblatta punkiko Asahina, 1967
122. Rhabdoblatta pustulata (Walker, 1868)
123. Rhabdoblatta quadrinotata (Walker, 1868)
124. Rhabdoblatta rattanakiriensis Anisyutkin, 1999
125. Rhabdoblatta regina (Saussure, 1869)
126. Rhabdoblatta ridleyi (Kirby, 1903)
127. Rhabdoblatta rustica (Stål, 1877)
128. Rhabdoblatta ryabovi Anisyutkin, 2009
129. Rhabdoblatta saravacensis (Shelford, 1906)
130. Rhabdoblatta saussurei (Kirby, 1903)
131. Rhabdoblatta segregata Anisyutkin, 2000
132. Rhabdoblatta similis (Bey-Bienko, 1954)
133. Rhabdoblatta similsinuata Yang, Wang, Zhou, Wang & Che, 2019
134. Rhabdoblatta simlansis (Baijal & Kapoor, 1966)
135. Rhabdoblatta simulans Anisyutkin, 2000
136. Rhabdoblatta sinensis (Walker, 1868)
137. Rhabdoblatta sinuata Bey-Bienko, 1958
138. Rhabdoblatta speciosa Anisyutkin, 2000
139. Rhabdoblatta stipata (Walker, 1868)
140. Rhabdoblatta structilis (Rehn, 1909)
141. Rhabdoblatta sublurida (Hanitsch, 1927)
142. Rhabdoblatta subsparsa (Walker, 1868)
143. Rhabdoblatta subvittata Bey-Bienko, 1968
144. Rhabdoblatta takahashii Asahina, 1967
145. Rhabdoblatta takarana Asahina, 1967
146. Rhabdoblatta tamdaoensis Anisyutkin, 2000
147. Rhabdoblatta trilobata (Saussure, 1891)
148. Rhabdoblatta trongana (Rehn, 1904)
149. Rhabdoblatta unicolor (Hanitsch, 1925)
150. Rhabdoblatta usambarensis (Rehn, 1931)
151. Rhabdoblatta varia (Walker, 1869)
152. Rhabdoblatta vasta (Walker, 1868)
153. Rhabdoblatta vietica Anisyutkin, 2000
154. Rhabdoblatta vittata Bey-Bienko, 1969
155. Rhabdoblatta wittei (Jolivet, 1954)
156. Rhabdoblatta xiai Liu & Zhu, 2001
157. Rhabdoblatta yayeyamana Asahina, 1967
