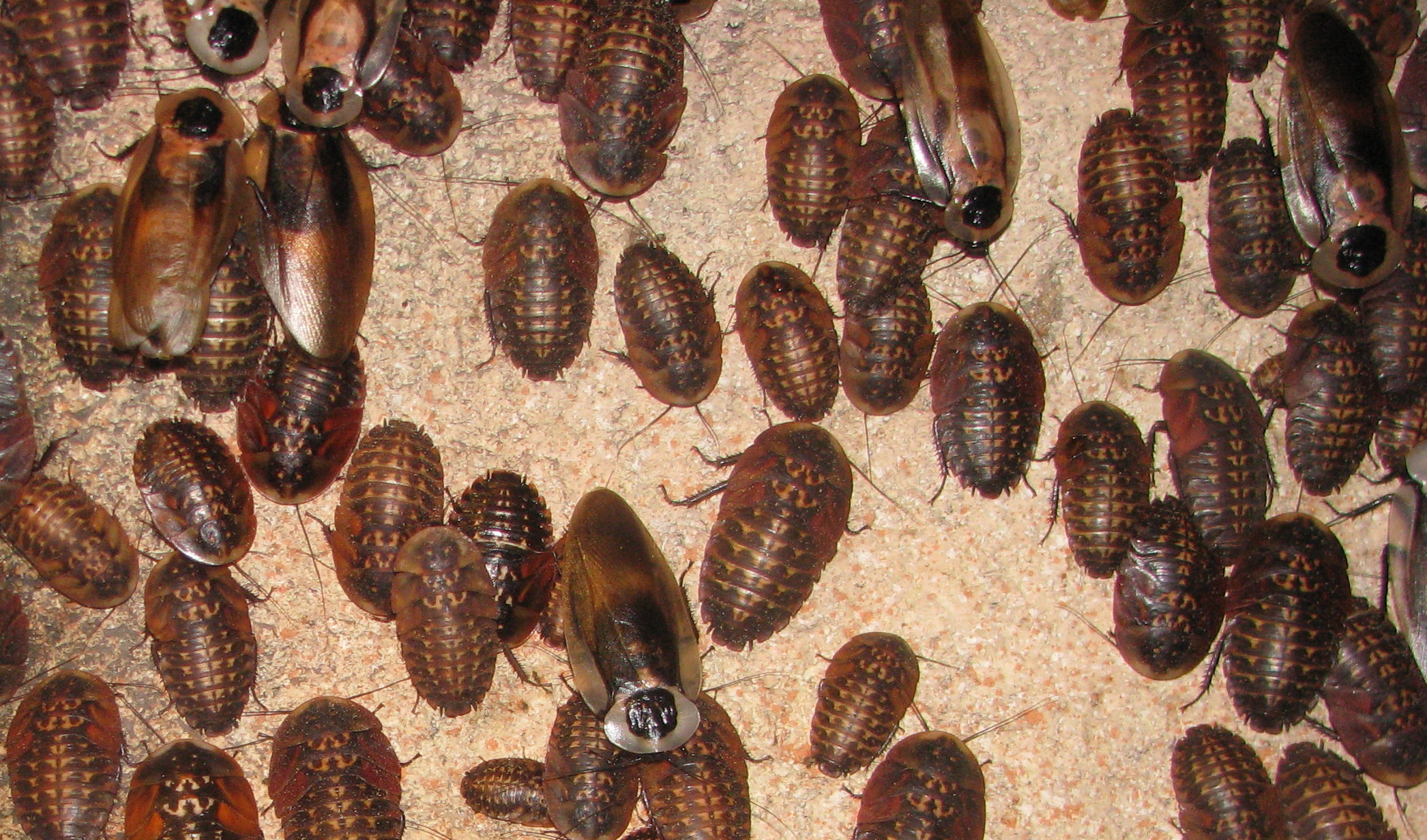
- Adults and subadults of Blaberus craniifer – the death's head cockroach

Scientific classification
- Kingdom: Animalia
- Phylum: Arthropoda
- Clade: Pancrustacea
- Class: Insecta
- Order: Blattodea
- Superfamily: Blaberoidea
- Family: Blaberidae; Saussure, 1864

Genera
- See text

Synonyms
- Blaberiens; Perisphaeridae Brunner von Wattenwyl, 1865

= Blaberidae =

Giant cockroaches Temporal range: Late Cretaceous–Present

Family of cockroaches

Giant cockroaches, or blaberids (family Blaberidae), are the second-largest cockroach family by number of species. Mostly distributed in warmer climates worldwide, this family is based on the American genus Blaberus, but much of the diversity is also found in Africa and Asia.

== Description ==
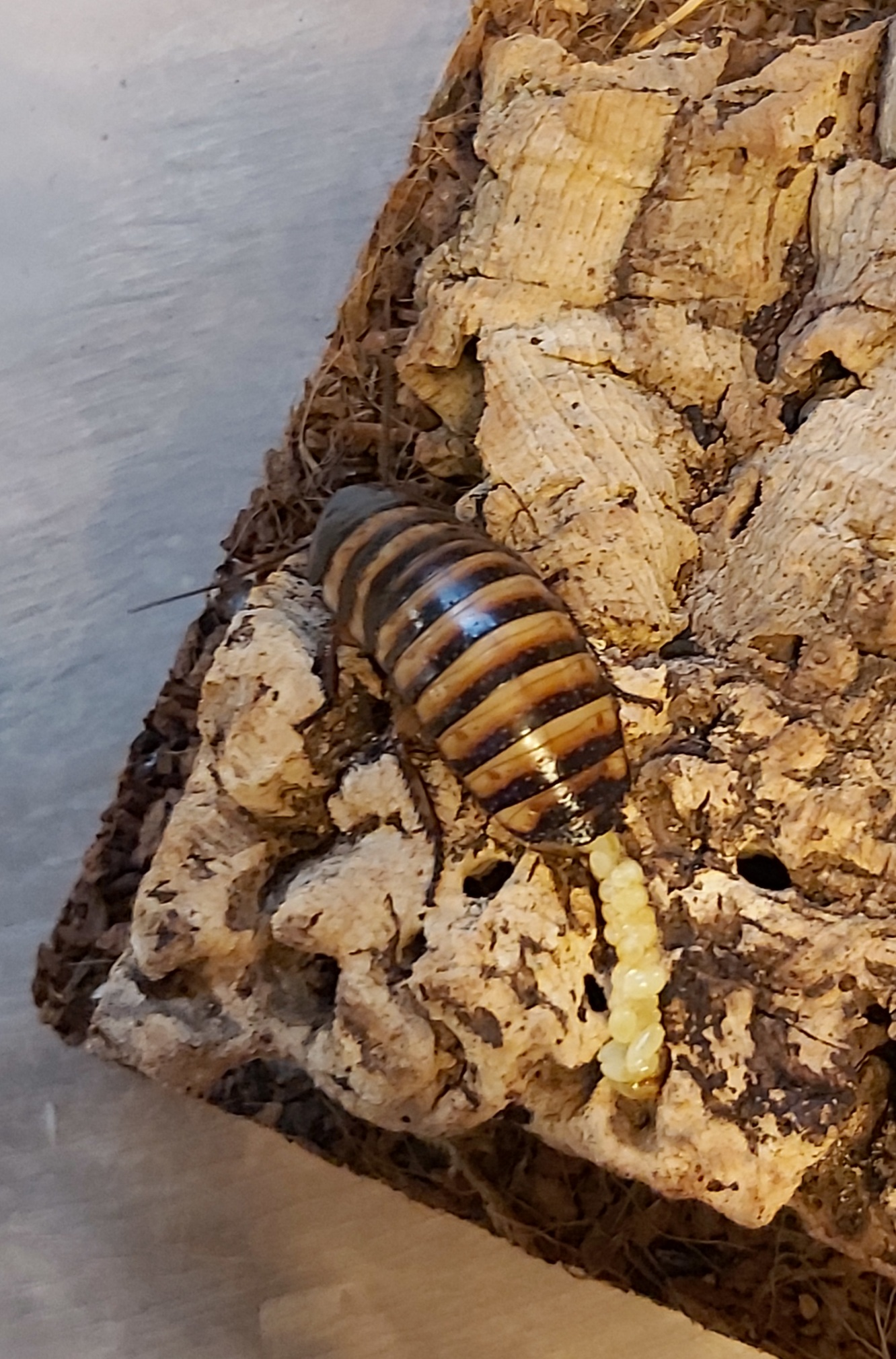
Elliptorhina javanica with an ootheca

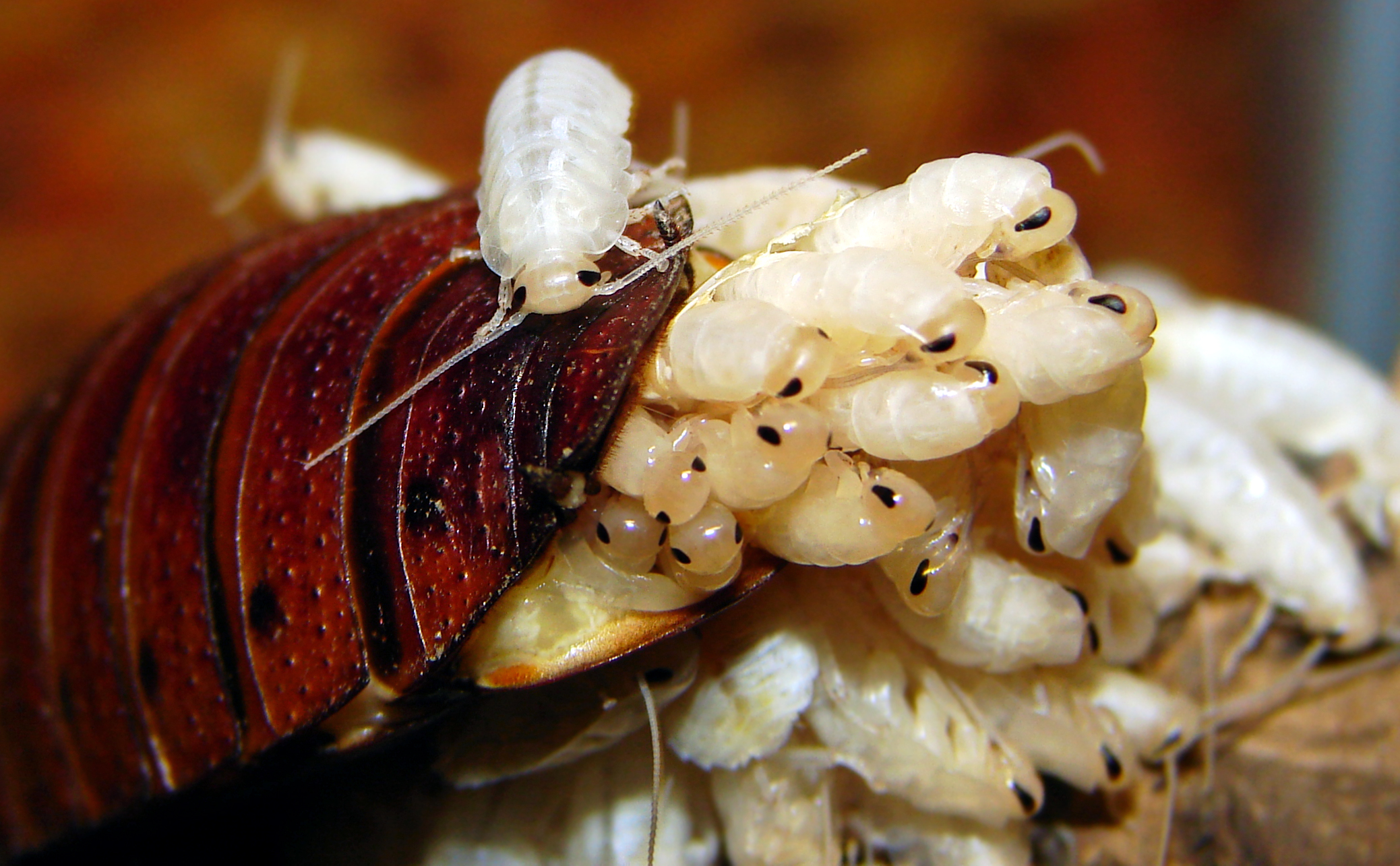
Gromphadorhina portentosa giving live birth

They are the only ovoviviparous cockroach family. The ootheca is seen very briefly before being retracted into the body, where soon after the young nymphs hatch inside, the female gives live birth. The cerci are smaller compared to other families, and most of the time are covered by wings. They're mostly found in caves, rotting logs or buried under leaf litter. Many are often kept as pets or as feeder insects, such as Blaberus, Gromphadorhina or Macropanesthia.

=== Notable species ===
Notable species within this family include:

- Cape mountain cockroach – Aptera fusca
- Dwarf cave cockroach – Blaberus atropos (syn. Blaberus fusca)
- Death's head cockroach – Blaberus craniifer
- False death's head cockroach – Blaberus discoidalis
- Giant cave cockroach – Blaberus giganteus
- Dubia cockroach – Blaptica dubia
- Orange head cockroach – Eublaberus posticus
- Glowspot cockroach – Lucihormetica verrucosa
- Beetle cockroach – Diploptera punctata
- Chrome cockroach – Gyna caffrorum
- Cuban, or green banana cockroach – Panchlora nivea
- Halloween hissing cockroach – Elliptorhina javanica
- Wide-horned hissing cockroach – Gromphadorhina oblongonota
- Madagascar hissing cockroach – Gromphadorhina portentosa
- Speckled cockroach – Nauphoeta cinerea
- Surinam cockroach – Pycnoscelus surinamensis
- Australian wood cockroach – Panesthia spp. including P. cribrata
- Giant burrowing cockroach – Macropanesthia rhinoceros
- Emerald cockroach – Pseudoglomeris magnifica

== Subfamilies and genera ==
The Cockroach Species File lists over 1260 species within 170 valid genera and 14 subfamilies.

=== Blaberinae ===
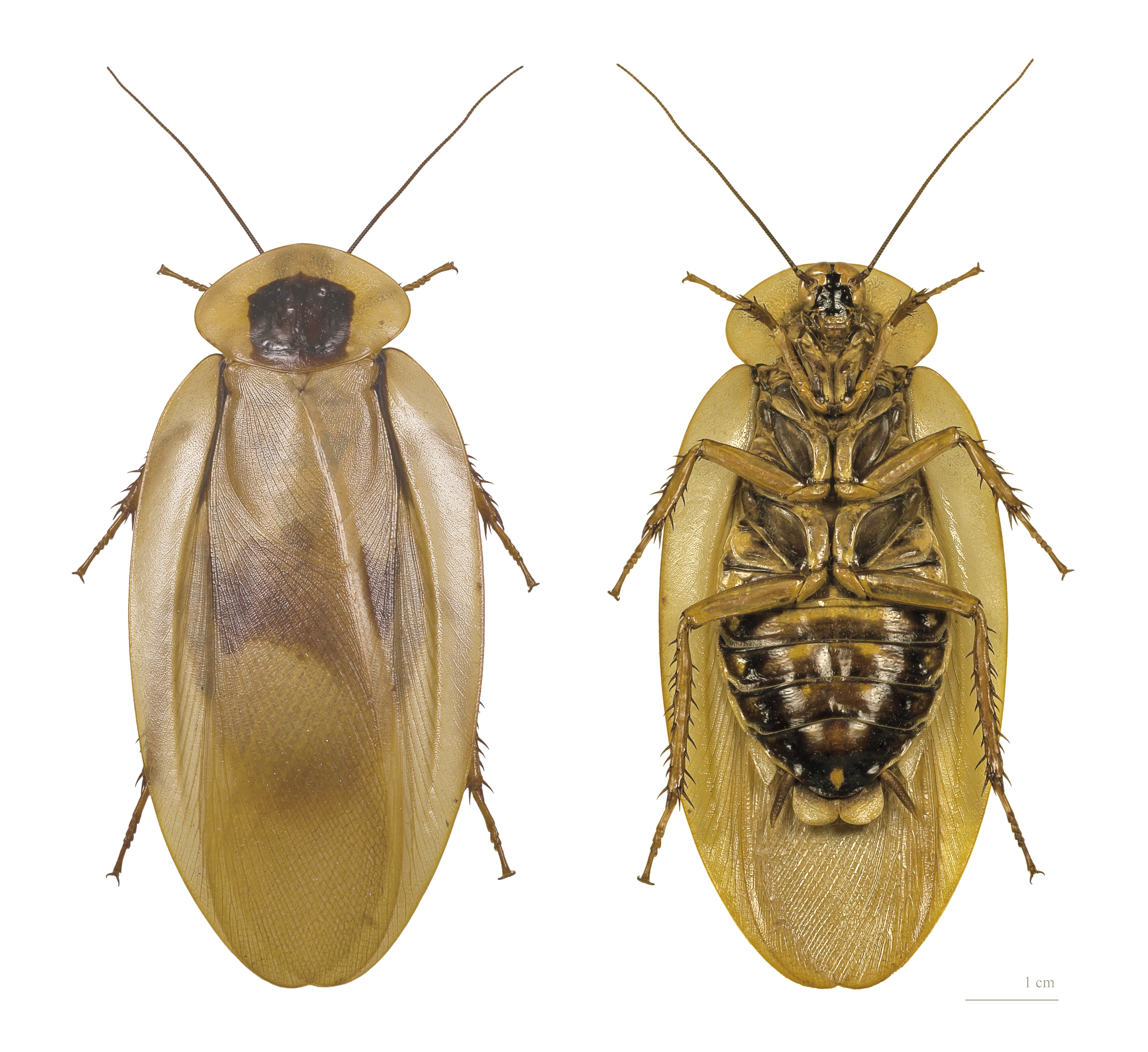
Blaberus giganteus

Auth.: Saussure, 1864; distribution: Americas

- Archimandrita Saussure, 1893
- Aspiduchus Rehn & Hebard, 1927
- Bionoblatta Rehn, 1940
- Blaberus Serville, 1831
- Blaptica Stål, 1874
- Byrsotria Stål, 1874
- Eublaberus Hebard, 1920
- Hemiblabera Saussure, 1893
- Hiereoblatta Rehn, 1937
- Hormetica Burmeister, 1838
- Hyporhicnoda Hebard, 1920
- Lucihormetica Zompro & Fritzsche, 1999
- Minablatta Rehn, 1940
- Monachoda Burmeister, 1838
- Monastria Saussure, 1864
- Neorhicnoda Grandcolas, 1992
- Oxycercus Bolívar, 1881
- Paradicta Grandcolas, 1992
- Parahormetica Brunner von Wattenwyl, 1865
- Petasodes Saussure, 1864
- Phoetalia Stål, 1874
- Quadrihormetica Vidlicka, 2019
- Sibylloblatta Rehn, 1937
- Styphon Rehn, 1930

Calolamprodinae Wang & Wang, 2023

- Calolamprodes Bey-Bienko, 1969 (India, China, Indochina)

Diplopterinae

Distribution: SE Asia, Australia, N. America

- Diploptera Saussure, 1864

=== Epilamprinae ===
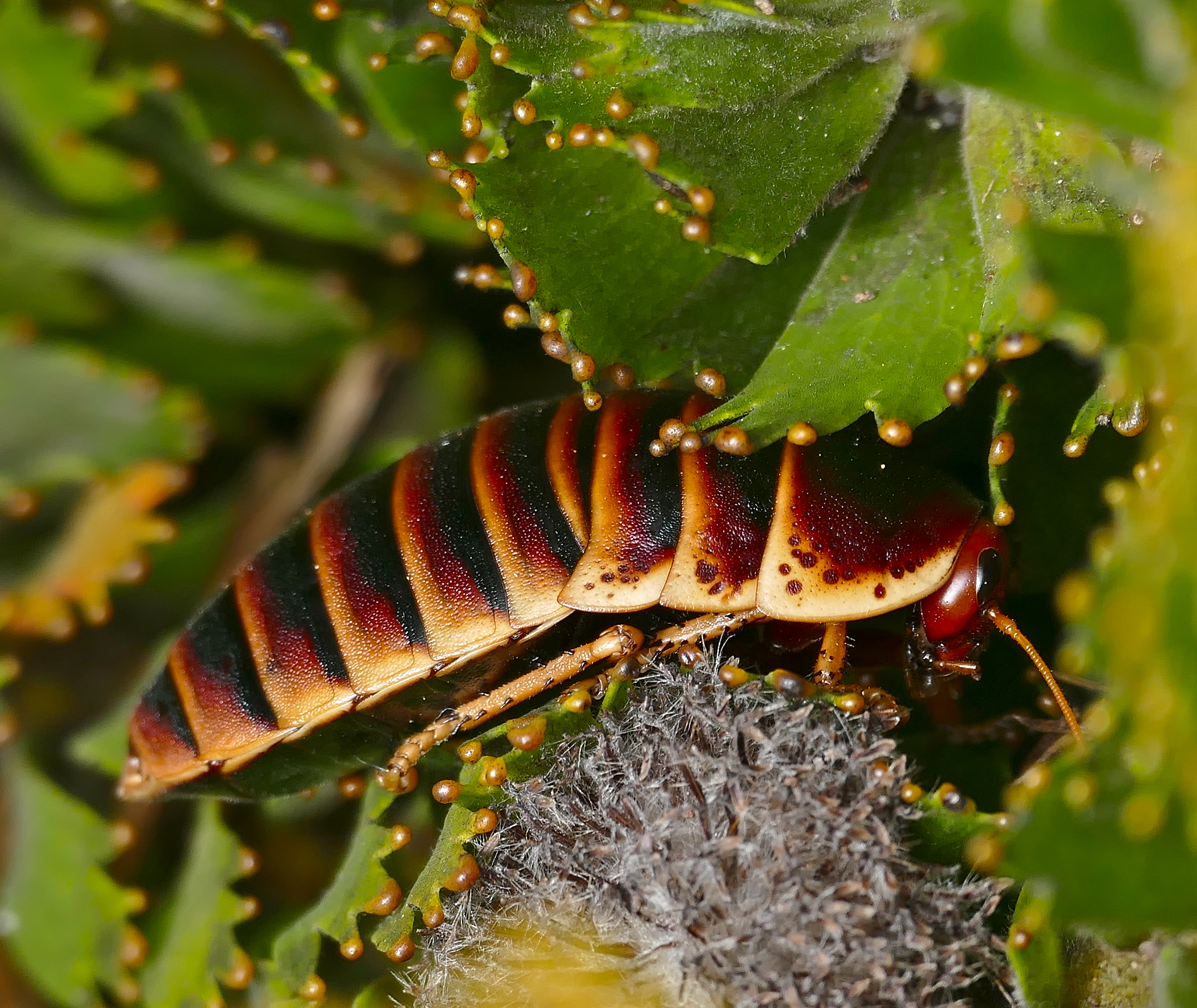
Aptera fusca

Auth.: Brunner von Wattenwyl, 1865; distribution: Americas, Africa, SE Asia, Australia

- Africalolampra Roth, 1995
- Alphelixia Roth, 1973
- Anisolampra Bey-Bienko, 1969
- Antioquita Hebard, 1933
- Aptera Saussure, 1864
- Apsidopis Saussure, 1895
- Ataxigamia Tepper, 1893
- Audreia Shelford, 1910
- Blepharodera Burmeister, 1838
- Brephallus Wang, Zhao, Li, Che & Wang, 2018
- Calolampra Saussure, 1893
- Capucinella Hebard, 1920
- Cariacasia Rehn, 1928
- Colapteroblatta Hebard, 1919
- Compsolampra Saussure, 1893
- Cyrtonotula Uvarov, 1939
- Dryadoblatta Rehn, 1930
- Decoralampra Lucañas, 2017
- Epilampra Burmeister, 1838
- Galiblatta Hebard, 1926
- Gurneya Roth, 1974
- Haanina Hebard, 1929
- Homalopteryx Brunner von Wattenwyl, 1865
- Howintoniella Roth, 1981
- Indoapterolampra Anisyutkin, 2014
- Juxtacalolampra Roth, 1981
- Litopeltis Hebard, 1920
- Miroblatta Shelford, 1906
- Molytria Stål, 1874
- Morphna Shelford, 1910
- Notolampra Saussure, 1862
- Opisthoplatia Brunner von Wattenwyl, 1865
- Orchidoeca Gurney & Roth, 1976
- Paracalolamprodes Anisyutkin, 2015
- Phlebonotus Saussure, 1862
- Phoraspis Serville, 1831
- Pinaconota Saussure, 1895
- Placoblatta Bey-Bienko, 1969
- Poeciloderrhis Stål, 1874
- Princisola Gurney & Roth, 1976
- Pseudophoraspis Kirby, 1903
- Rhabdoblatta Kirby, 1903
- Rhicnoda Brunner von Wattenwyl, 1893
- Stictolampra Hanitsch, 1930
- Thorax Saussure, 1862
- Ylangella Roth, 2002

=== Geoscapheinae ===
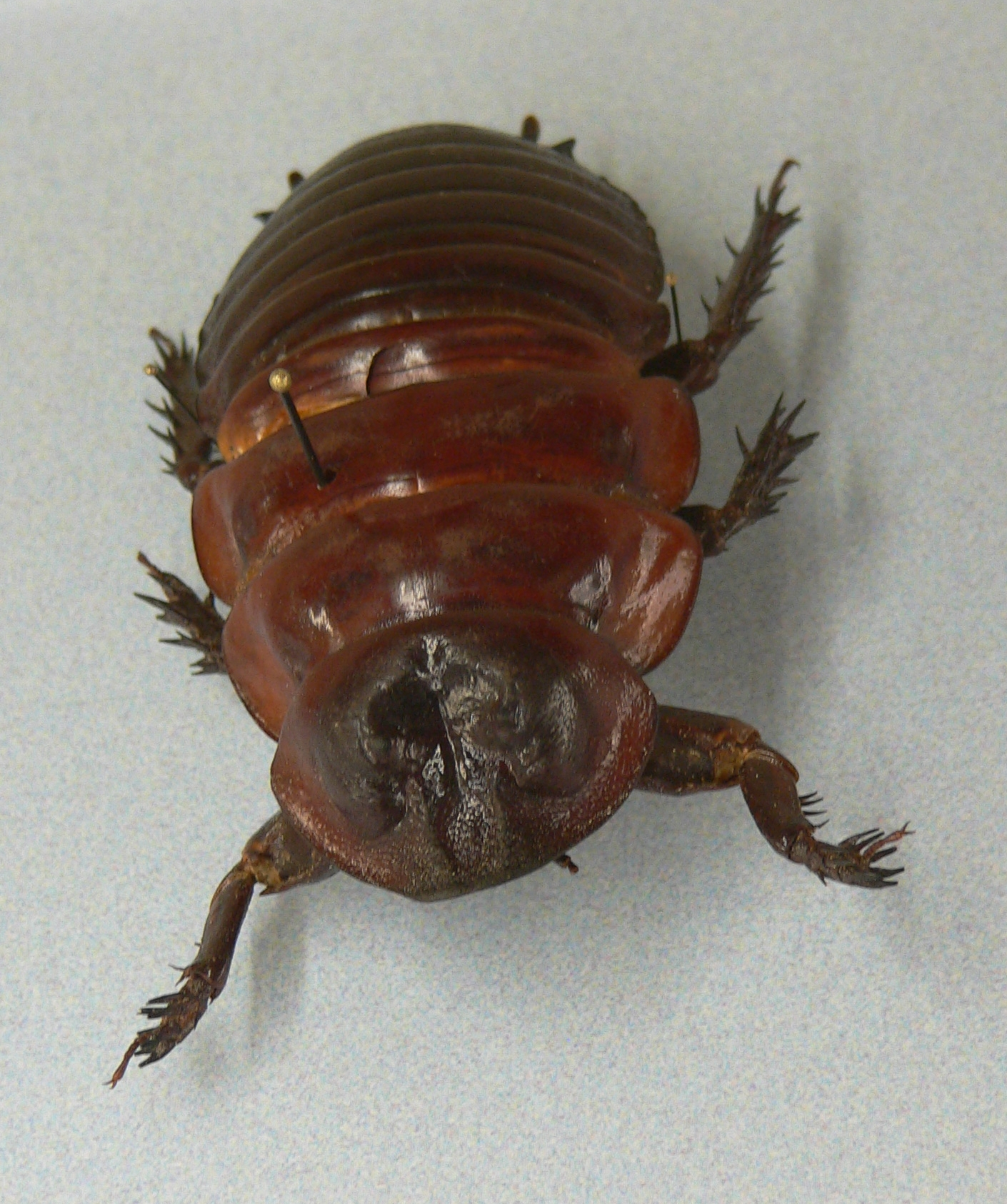
Macropanesthia rhinoceros

Distribution: Malesia, Australasia (not mainland Asia)

- Geoscapheus Tepper, 1893
- Macropanesthia Saussure, 1895
- Neogeoscapheus Roth, 1977
- Parapanesthia Roth, 1977

=== Gyninae ===
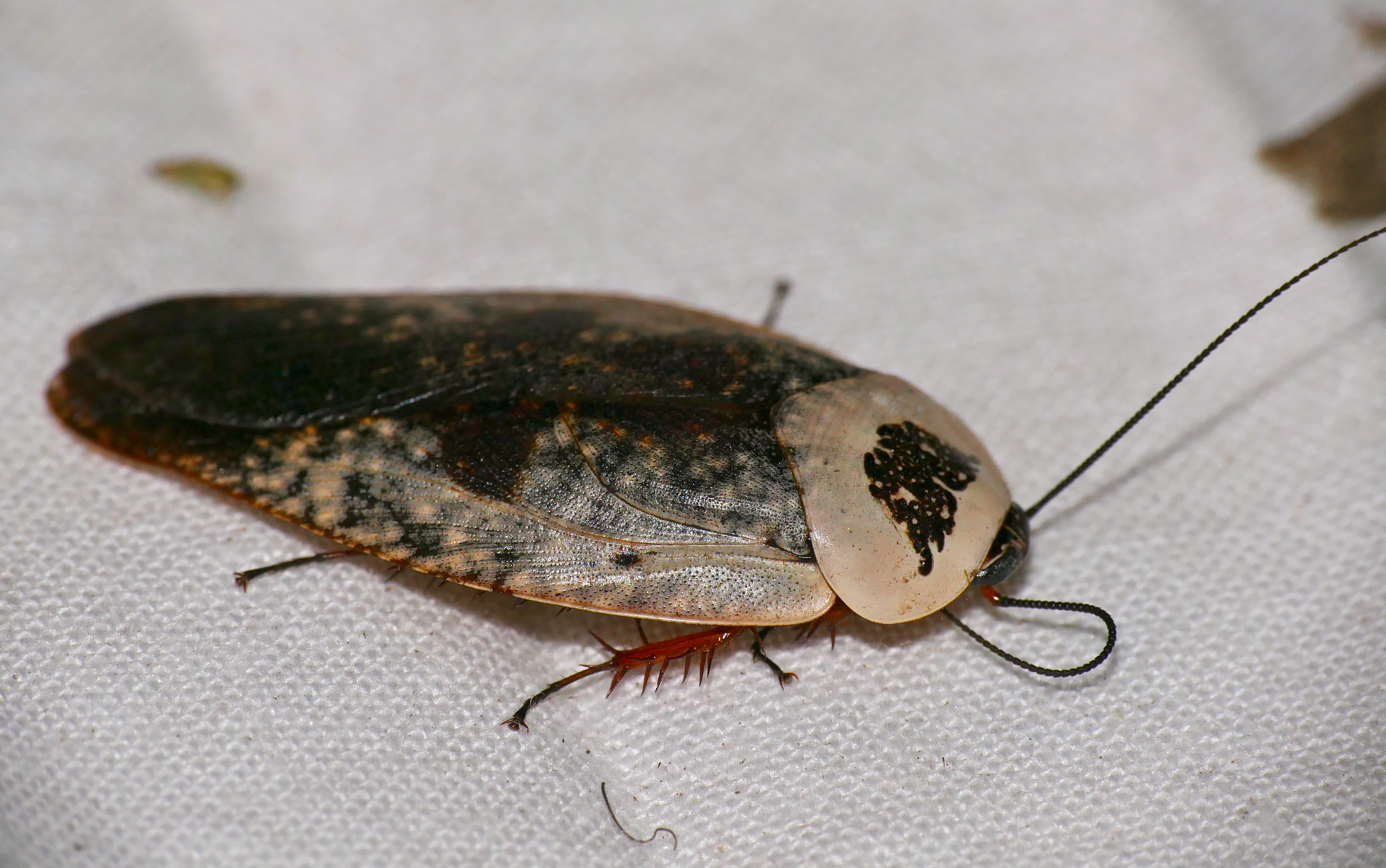
Gyna caffrorum

Distribution: Africa

- Alloblatta Grandcolas, 1993
- Gyna Brunner von Wattenwyl, 1865
- Paraprincisaria Grandcolas, 1993
- Princisaria Kumar, 1975
- Pseudocalolampra Roth & Princis, 1971

=== Oxyhaloinae ===
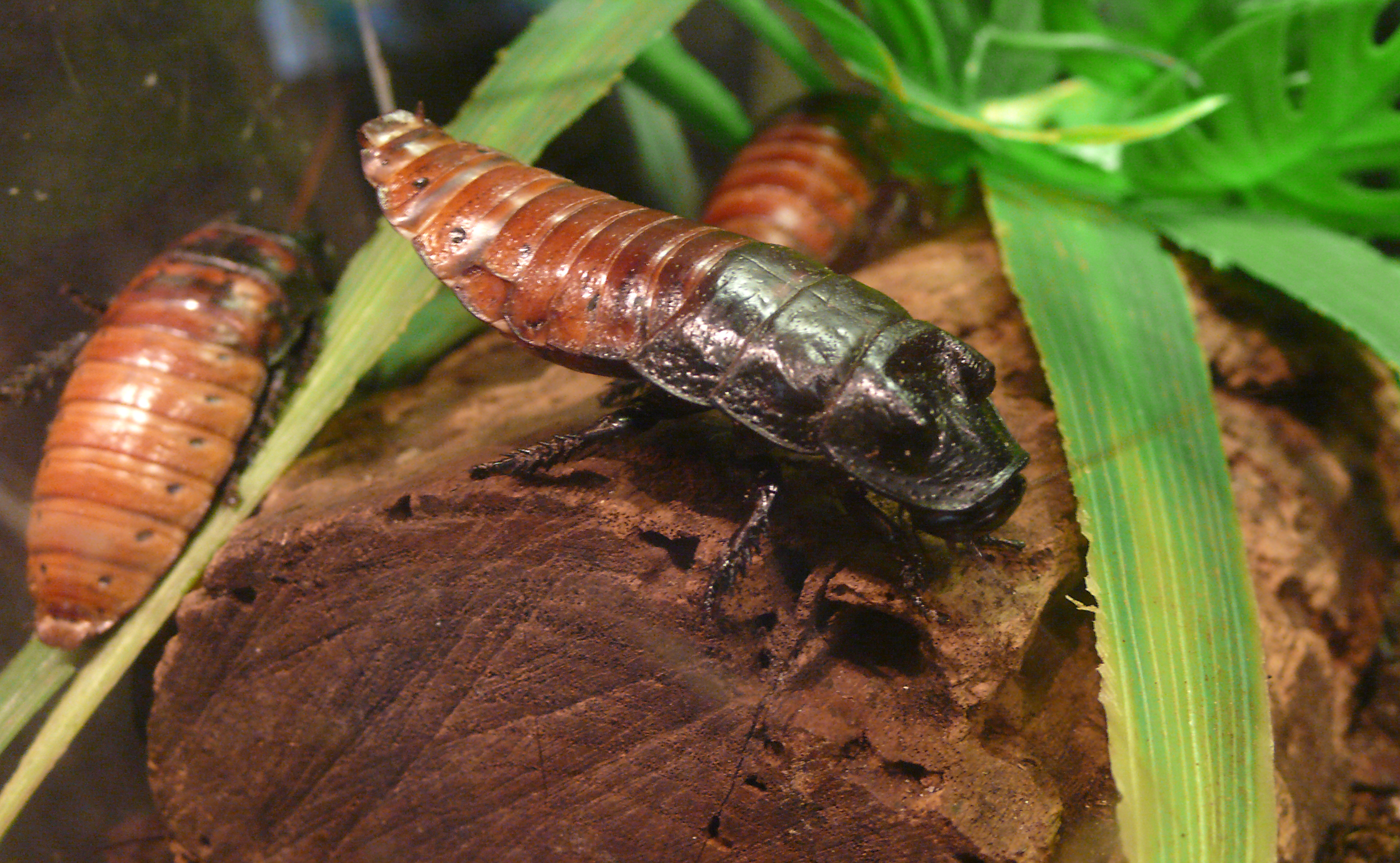
Gromphadorhina portentosa

Distribution: Africa – 3 tribes:

- Gromphadorhini
- Aeluropoda Butler, 1882
- Ateloblatta Saussure, 1891
- Elliptorhina van Herrewege, 1973
- Gromphadorhina Brunner von Wattenwyl, 1865
- Leozehntnera van Herrewege, 1975
- Princisia van Herrewege, 1973
- Nauphoetini
- Griffiniella Karny, 1908
- Henschoutedenia Princis, 1954
- Jagrehnia Princis, 1954
- Nauphoeta Burmeister, 1838
- Rhyparobia Krauss, 1892
- Simandoa Roth & Naskrecki, 2004
- Oxyhaloini
- Oxyhaloa Brunner von Wattenwyl, 1865
- Incertae sedis
- Brachynauphoeta van Herrewege, 1975
- Coleoblatta Hanitsch, 1950
- Heminauphoeta Saussure, 1891
- Pronauphoeta Shelford, 1909

=== Panchlorinae ===
Distribution: Americas, Africa

- Achroblatta Saussure, 1893
- Anchoblatta Shelford, 1909
- Biolleya Saussure, 1897
- Panchlora Burmeister, 1838
- Pelloblatta Rehn, 1903

=== Panesthiinae ===
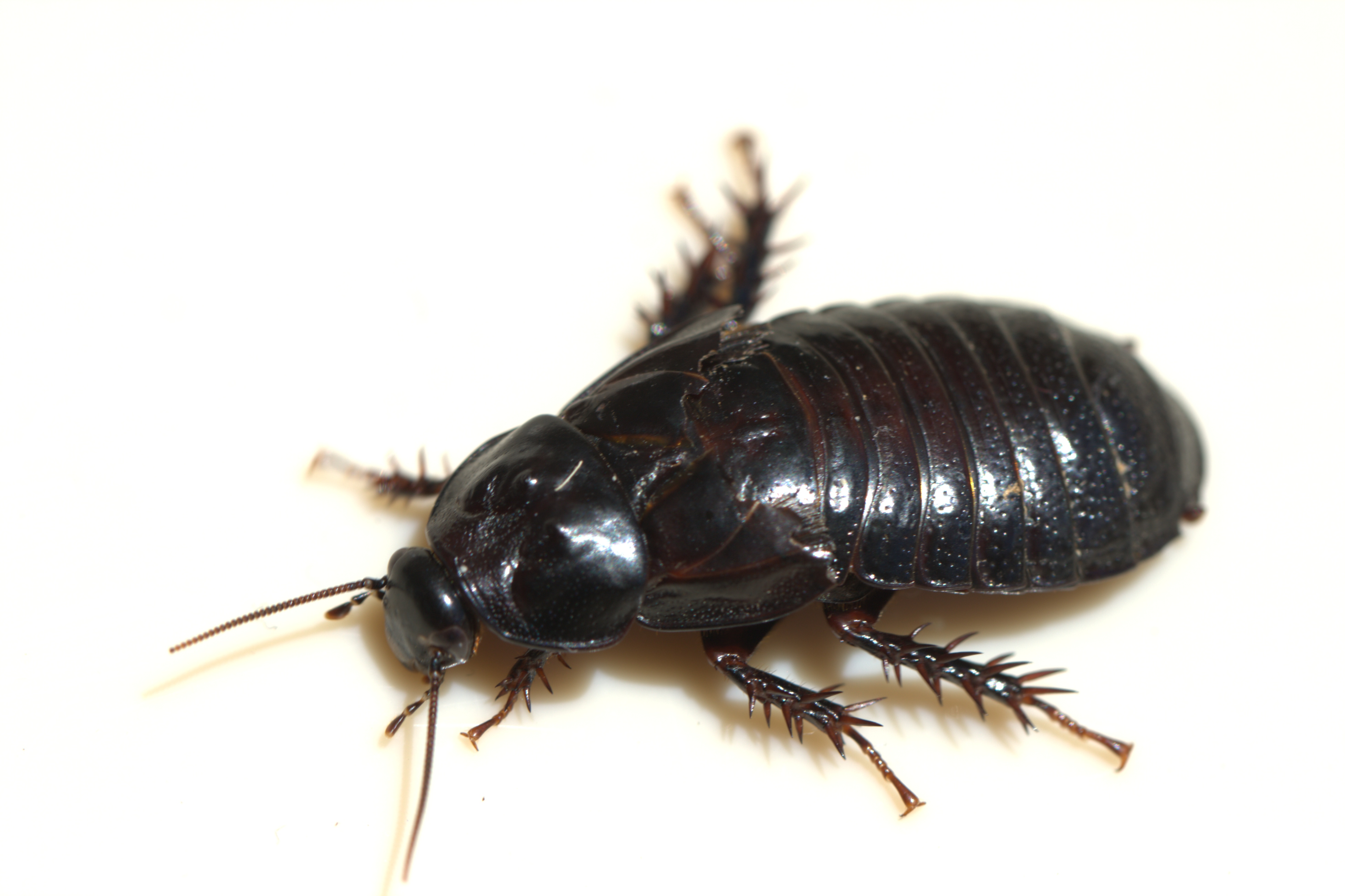
Panesthia sp.

Distribution: Madagascar, India, China, SE Asia through to Australia

- Ancaudellia Shaw, 1925
- Annamoblatta Sergeev, 1984 - monotypic Annamoblatta vietnamica Sergeev
- Caeparia Stål, 1877
- Microdina Kirby, 1903
- Miopanesthia Saussure, 1895
- Panesthia Serville, 1831
- Salganea Stål, 1877

Paranauphoetinae Rehn, 1951

- Paranauphoeta Brunner von Wattenwyl, 1865 (India, China, Indochina, Malesia, New Guinea)

=== Perisphaerinae ===
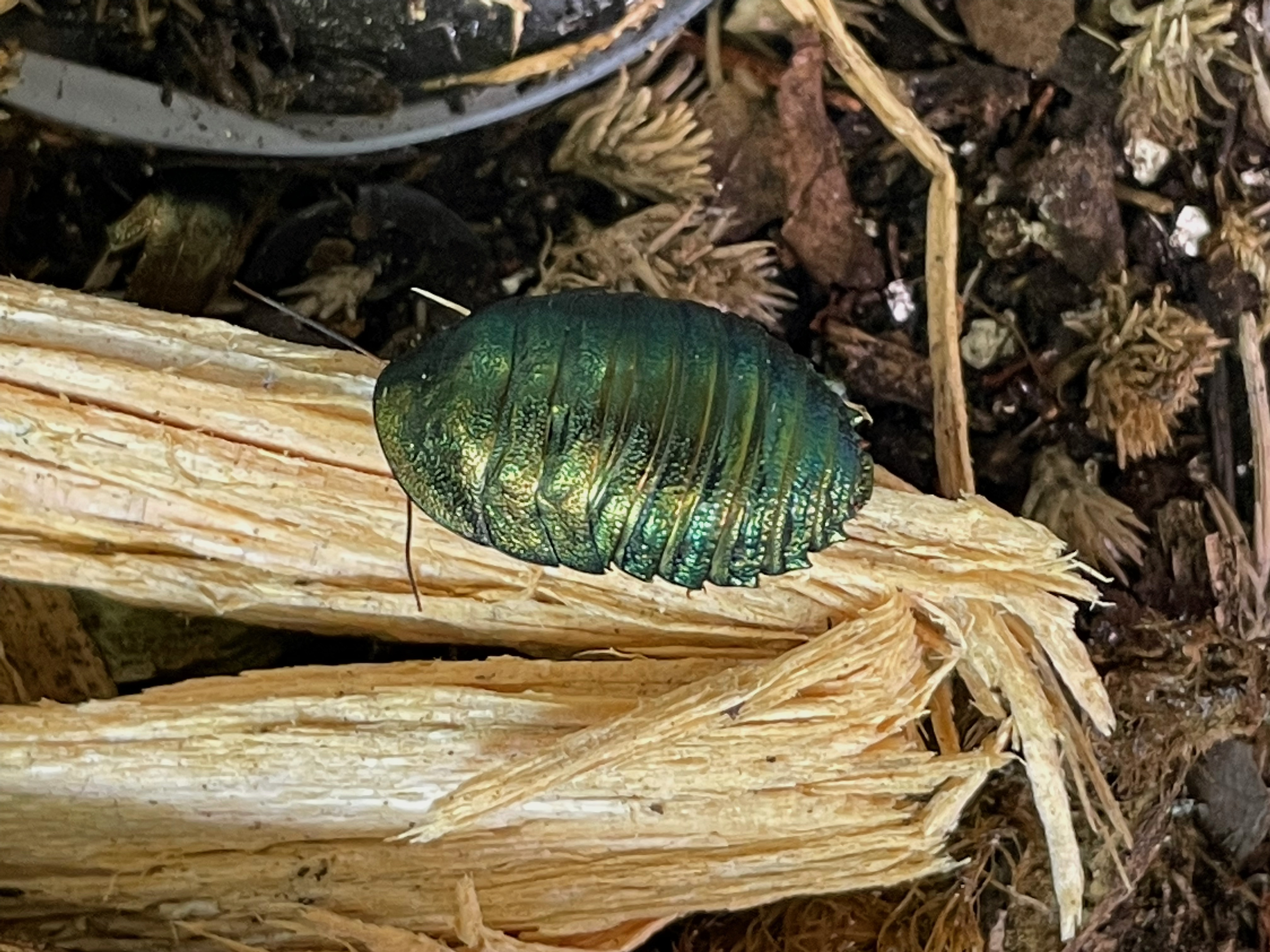
Corydidarum magnifica

Auth.: Brunner von Wattenwyl, 1865; distribution: Africa, SE Asia, Australia

- Bantua Shelford, 1908
- Compsagis Chopard, 1952
- Corydidarum Brunner von Wattenwyl, 1865
  (= Trichoblatta Saussure & Zehntner, 1895)
- Cyrtotria Stål, 1871
- Derocalymma Burmeister, 1838
- Ellipsica Saussure & Zehntner, 1895
- Elliptoblatta Saussure, 1891
- Gymnonyx Saussure & Zehntner, 1895
- Hostilia (cockroach) Stål, 1871
- Hyposphaeria Lucas, 1863 (many synonyms)
- Laxta Walker, 1868
- Neolaxta Mackerras, 1968
- Perisphaerus Serville, 1831
  (= Perisphaera [sic] Serville)
- Pilema Saussure, 1873
- Platysilpha Shelford, 1908
- Poeciloblatta Saussure & Zehntner, 1895
- Pseudoglomeris Brunner von Wattenwyl, 1893
- Zuluia Rehn, 1922

=== Pycnoscelinae ===
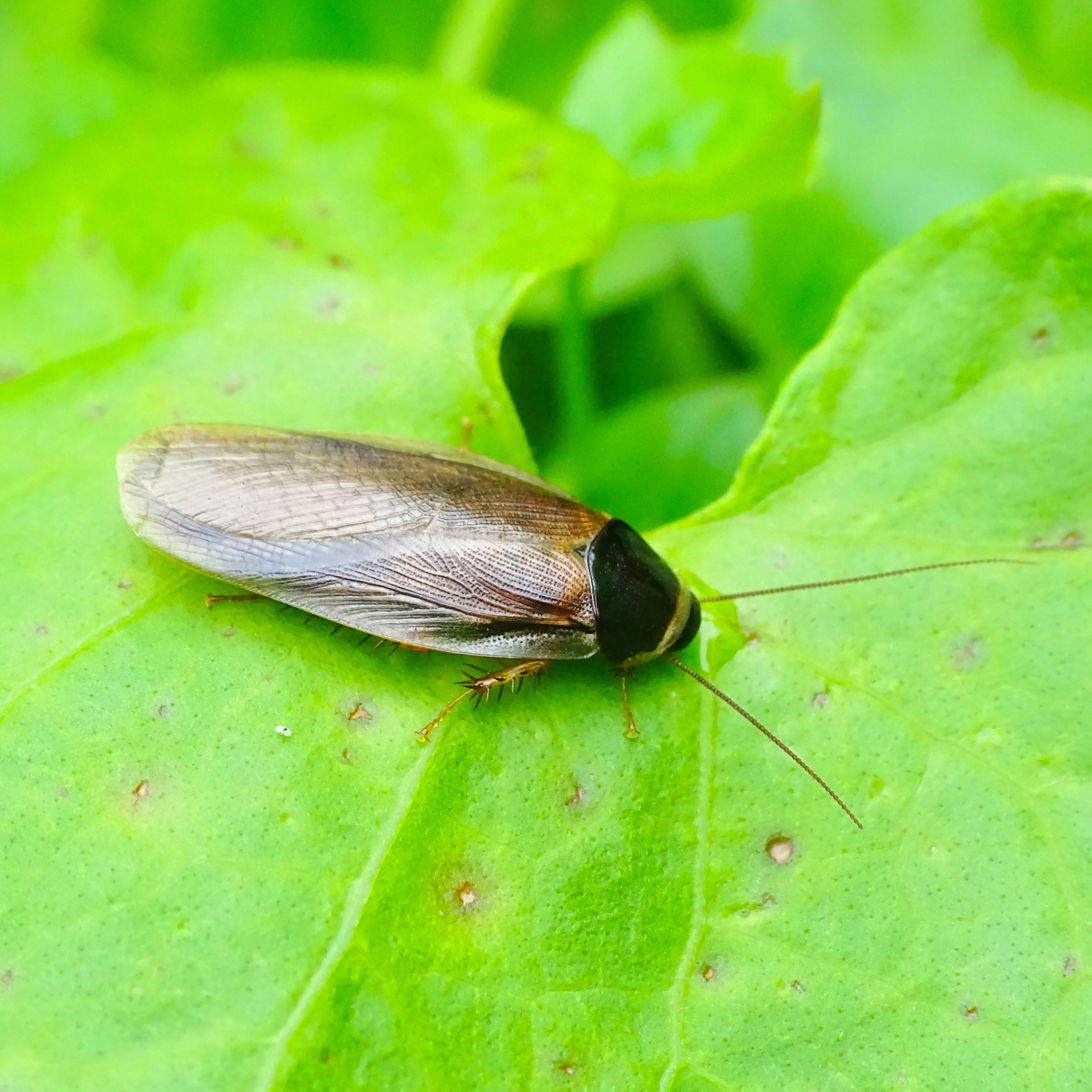
Pycnoscelus indicus

Distribution: SE Asia & S. America

- Proscratea Burmeister, 1838 - S. America
- Pycnoscelus Scudder, 1862
- Stilpnoblatta Saussure & Zehntner, 1895

Rhabdoblattellinae Wang & Wang, 2023

- Rhabdoblattella Anisyutkin, 1999 (China, Indochina)

=== Zetoborinae ===
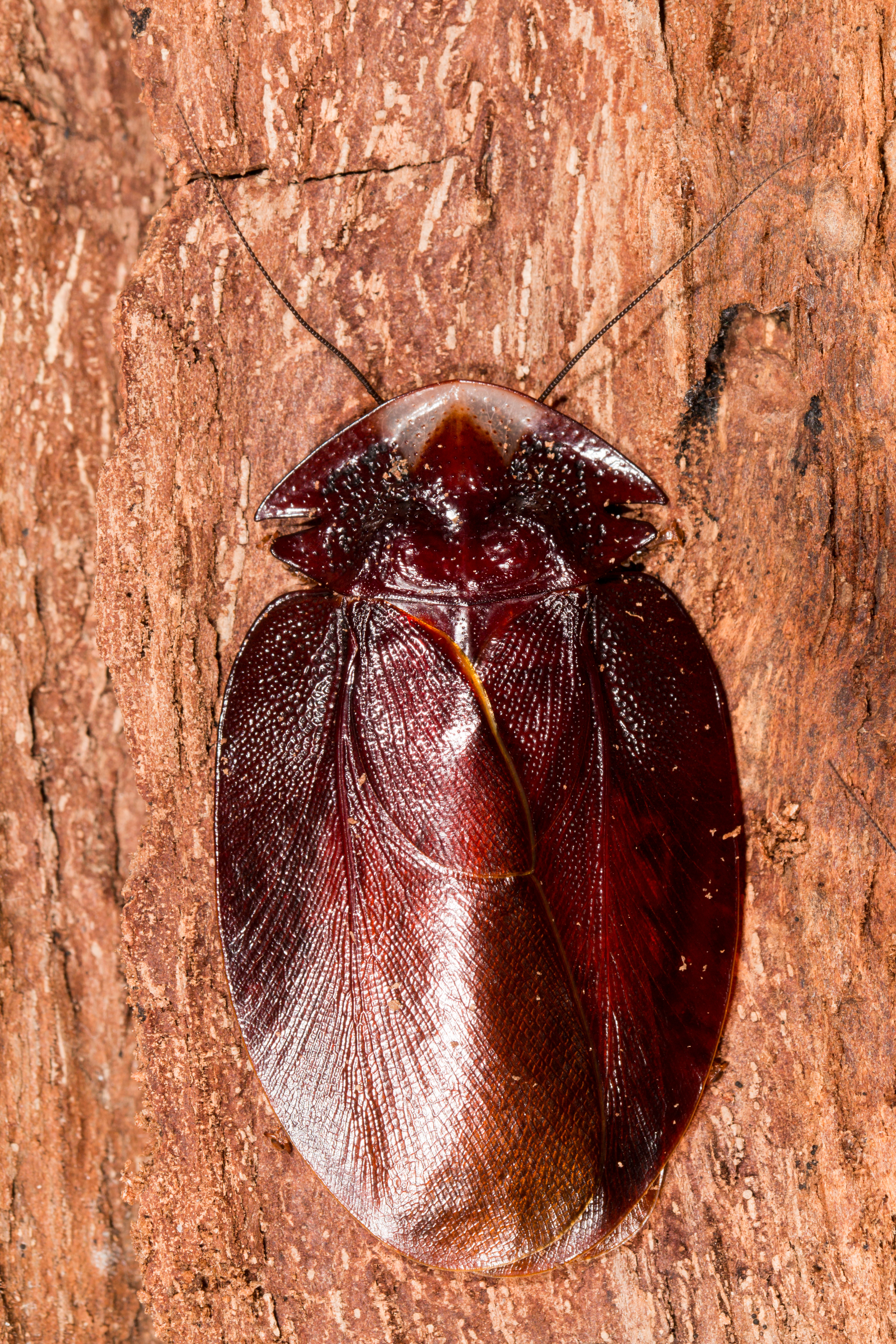
Schizopilia fissicollis

Distribution: Central & S. America

- Alvarengaia Rocha e Silva & Aguiar, 1977
- Capucina Saussure, 1893
- Lanxoblatta Hebard, 1931
- Parasphaeria Brunner von Wattenwyl, 1865
- Phortioeca Saussure, 1862
- Phortioecoides Rehn, 1937
- Schistopeltis Rehn, 1916
- Schizopilia Saussure, 1864
- Schultesia (cockroach) Roth, 1973
- Thanatophyllum Grandcolas, 1991
- Tribonium Saussure, 1862
- Tribonoidea Shelford, 1908
- Zetobora Burmeister, 1838
- Zetoborella Hebard, 1921

=== Genera Incertae sedis ===
- Apotrogia Kirby, 1900
- Cacoblatta Saussure, 1893
- Derocardia Saussure, 1895
- Diplopterina Princis, 1963 (W. Africa)
- Elfridaia Shaw, 1925
- Eustegasta Gerstaecker, 1883
- Evea (cockroach) Shelford, 1909
- Glyptopeltis Saussure, 1873
- Gynopeltis Gerstaecker, 1869
- Hedaia Saussure & Zehntner, 1895
- Isoniscus Borg, 1902
- Kemneria Princis, 1946
- Mesoblaberus Princis, 1951
- Mioblatta Saussure & Zehntner, 1895
- Paraplecta Shelford, 1907
- Phenacisma Karsch, 1896
- Progonogamia Rehn, 1922
- Pseudogyna Shelford, 1909
- Pseudoplatia Hanitsch, 1930
- Stictomorphna Bruijning, 1948
- Thliptoblatta Saussure & Zehntner, 1895
- Thoracopygia Saussure & Zehntner, 1895
- Weiblatta Fu, Su & Luo, 2026

=== Taxonomy note ===
Among the genera of uncertain subfamily, Eustegasta, Isoniscus and Poeciloderrhis have been removed from subfamily Perisphaerinae.
