= International Institute for Species Exploration =

US-based research institute

- Founded: 2007
- Dissolved: 2018
- Purpose: Taxonomy, Biodiversity
- Location: Syracuse, New York, US
- Region served: Worldwide
- Owner: State University of New York
- Key people: Quentin D. Wheeler, Executive Director
- Website: www.esf.edu/species/

The International Institute for Species Exploration (IISE) was a research institute located in Syracuse, New York. Its mission was to improve taxonomical exploration and the cataloging of new species of flora and fauna. Between 2008 and 2018, IISE published a yearly "Top 10" of the most unusual or unique biota newly identified in the previous year, with the aim of drawing attention to the work done in taxonomy across the world over the previous year.

In 2011, the institute contributed towards the estimate that Earth was home to approximately 8.7 million species.

The institute disbanded in 2018 when its founder, Quentin D. Wheeler, resigned.

== Overview ==
The International Institute for Species Exploration (IISE) was a research facility dedicated to cataloging the Earth's species across all biological kingdoms. IISE cited three reasons why an improved taxonomic understanding of life is important: without knowing what exists today, humans will be unable to tell when species go extinct; the diversity of life driven by billions of years of natural selection means nature likely holds the answers to many human problems; and to better appreciate our place in the world.

IISE was hosted by the State University of New York College of Environmental Science and Forestry and located in Syracuse, New York, United States. It was founded in 2007. IISE was previously associated with Arizona State University. The institute's executive director was Quentin D. Wheeler, an entomologist.

In 2011, the Institute contributed to a widely publicized estimate that Earth is home to approximately 8.7 million species.

== Top 10 New Species list ==
Between 2008 and 2018, the IISE published an annual list of the "Top 10 New Species" in an effort to increase public awareness of the diversity of life on Earth. The list was credited with bringing attention to the abundance of new discovers, just as the world's species are declining. Additionally, Wheeler said he hopes it spurs a sense of urgency to catalog Earth's creatures.

Each year an international panel picked the list from the 17,000–18,000 species described during the previous calendar year, emphasizing diversity with their picks. To be eligible for inclusion, the species must have been formally described in an accredited scientific journal and named within the previous calendar year. The list was published on or just before May 23, the birthday of Carl Linnaeus, the "father" of taxonomy. The list was unordered. According to selection committee chair Antonio Valdecasas, it was very difficult to select the list due to the large number of species discovered each year. He added that he was "always surprised" by the diverse discoveries each year and that we are "very far" from a complete description of life on Earth.

The list regularly drew considerable press attention. The Delhi Daily News said the list "highlights the most amazing species found last year", while the New Zealand Herald called the creatures it features "bizarre discoveries". TIME magazine called the list the "best of the best when it comes to new life".

=== 2008 ===
- Ornate sleeper ray (Electrolux addisoni)
- Duck-billed Dinosaur (Gryposaurus monumentensis)
- Shocking pink dragon millipede (Desmoxytes purpurosea)
- Good Mother frog (Philautus maia)
- Central Ranges Taipan (Oxyuranus temporalis)
- Mindoro strip-faced fruit bat (Styloctenium mindorensis)
- Silverwood mushroom (Xerocomus silwoodensis)
- Irukandji Jellyfish (Malo kingi)
- Rhinoceros beetle (Megaceras briansaltini)
- Michelin Man Plant (Tecticornia bibenda)

=== 2009 ===
- Tahina Palm (Tahina spectabilis)
- Phasmatid (Phobaeticus chani)
- Satomi's Pygmy Seahorse (Hippocampus satomiae)
- Barbados Threadsnake (Leptotyphlops carlae)
- Ghost Slug (Selenochlamys ysbryda)
- Wormy Snail (Opisthostoma vermiculum)
- Deep Blue Chromis (Chromis abyssus)
- Mother Fish (Materpiscis attenboroughi)
- Charrier Coffee (Coffea charrieriana)
- Extremophile bacterium (Microbacterium hatanonis)

=== 2010 ===
- Attenborough's Pitcher (Nepenthes attenboroughii)
- Green bombers (Swima bombviridis)
- Angona (Dioscorea orangeana)
- Aiteng (Aiteng ater)
- Psychedelic frogfish (Histiophryne pschedelica)
- Komac's golden orb spider (Nephila komaci)
- Small Favor (Phallus drewesii)
- Dracula minnow (Danionella dracula)
- Omars' banded knifefish (Gymnotus omarorum)
- Carnivorous sponge (Chondrocladia turbiformis)

=== 2011 ===
- Darwin's bark spider (Caerostris darwini)
- Eternal light mushroom (Mycena luxaeterna)
- Bacterium (Halomonas titanicae)
- Sierra Madre Forest Monitor (Varanus bitatawa)
- Pollinating Cricket (Glomeremus orchidophilus)
- Walter's Duiker (Philantomba walteri)
- Leech (Tyrannobdella rex)
- Rogue mushroom (Psathyrella aquatica)
- Leaproach (Saltoblattella montistabularis)
- Louisiana Pancake Batfish (Halieutichthys intermedius)

=== 2012 ===
The Top 10 New Species for 2012 were announced on May 24, 2012, and included (in alphabetical order):

- Bonaire banded box jellyfish (Tamoya ohboya)
- Night-blooming orchid (Bulbophyllum nocturnum)
- Wandering leg sausage (Crurifarcimen vagans)
- Devil worm (Halicephalobus mephisto)
- Walking cactus (Diania cactiformis)
- Dive-bombing wasp (Kollasmosoma sentum)
- Myanmar snub-nosed monkey (Rhinopithecus strykeri)
- Nepalese autumn poppy (Meconopsis autumnalis)
- Sazima's tarantula (Pterinopelma sazimai, syn. of Lasiocyano sazimai)
- Spongebob squarepants mushroom (Spongiforma squarepantsii)

=== 2013 ===
The Top 10 New Species for 2013 were announced on May 22, 2013, and included (in alphabetical order):

- Petriky Forest Eugenia (Eugenia petrikensis)
- Scorpionfly (Juracimbrophlebia ginkgofolia)
- Lesula monkey (Cercopithecus lomamiensis)
- Lilliputian violet (Viola lilliputana)
- Lightning Roach (Lucihormetica luckae)
- Lyre sponge (Chondrocladia lyra)
- Lascaux Cave Fungus (Ochroconis lascauxensis)
- Microhylid Frog (Paedophryne amauensis)
- Green Lacewing (Semachrysa jade)
- No to the Mine (Sibon noalamina)

=== 2014 ===
The 2014 list was announced on May 22, 2014. According to National Geographic, the list featured "a lineup of startling creatures notable for their scrappiness, weirdness, thrift, and sloth."

- Kaweesak's dragon tree (Dracena kaweesakii)
- Olinguito (Bassaricyon neblina)
- ANDRILL Anmone (Edwardsiella andrillae)
- Skeleton Shrimp (Liropus minusculus)
- Cape Melville leaf-tailed gecko (Saltuarius eximius)
- Domed Land Snail (Zospeum tholussum)
- Tinkerbell Fairyfly (Tinkerbella nana)
- Orange Penicillium (Penicillium vanoranjei)
- Amoeboid Protist (Spiculosiphon oceana)
- Clean Room Microbes (Tersicoccus phoenicis)

=== 2015 ===
The list was announced on 23 May, to coincide with the birthday of Carolus Linnaeus.

- Feathered dinosaur (Anzu wyliei)
- Coral plant (Balanophora coralliformis)
- Cartwheeling spider (Cebrennus rechenbergi)
- The X-phyla (Dendrogramma enigmatica)
- Bone-house wasp (Deuteragenia ossarium)
- Indonesian frog (Limnonectes larvaepartus)
- Walking stick (Phryganistria tamdaoensis)
- Sea slug (Phyllodesmium acanthorhinum)
- Bromeliad (Tillandsia religiosa)
- Pufferfish (Torquigener albomaculosus)

=== 2016 ===
- Giant tortoise (Chelonoidis donfaustoi)
- Giant sundew (Drosera magnifica)
- Hominin (Homo naledi)
- Isopod (Luiuniscus iuiuensis)
- Anglerfish (Lasiognathus dinema)
- Seadragon (Phyllopteryx dewysea)
- Tiny Beetle (Phytotelmatrichis osopaddington)
- New Primate (Pliobates cataloniae)
- Flowering Tree (Sirdavidia solannona)
- Sparklewing (Umma gumma)

=== 2017 ===
- "Sorting Hat" Spider (Eriovixia gryffindori)
- Unexpected Katydid (Eulophophyllum kirki)
- Omnivorous Root Rat (Gracilimus radix)
- 414-legged Millipede (Illacme tobini)
- "Dragon" Ant (Pheidole drogon)
- Freshwater Stingray (Potamotrygon rex)
- Swimming Centipede (Scolopendra cataracta)
- Bush Tomato (Solanum ossicruentum)
- Endangered Orchid (Telipogon diabolicus)
- "Churro" Marine Worm (Xenoturbella churro)

=== 2018 ===
- Protist (Ancoracysta twista)
- Atlantic forest tree (Dinizia jueirana-facao)
- Amphipod (Epimeria quasimodo)
- Baffling Beetle (Nymphister kronaueri)
- Tapanuli Orangutan (Pongo tapanuliensis)
- Swire's Snailfish (Pseudoliparis swirei)
- Heterotrophic Flower (Sciaphila sugimotoi)
- Volcanic Bacterium (Thiolava veneris)
- Marsupial Lion (Wakaleo schouteni)
- Cave Beetle (Xuedytes bellus)

== State of observed species report ==
The IISE also released an annual report that inventoried the complete list of species cataloged two years prior and discussed the state of new species discovery. The 2011 report, for example, found that 19,232 species were named in 2009, a 5.6% increase over the prior year. The report took about two years to compile due to the lack of standardized registration for new species, an issue on which the IISE campaigned. It routinely found that insects made up roughly half of all new species discovered, followed by vascular plants and arachnids.
