= Snail-eater =

There are three genera of snake named snail-eater:

- Dipsas
- Plesiodipsas, a monotypic genus in the Colubridae, with its sole representative, Alemán's snail-eater, Plesiodipsas perijanensis
- Sibon (snake)
