= Diva Diniz Corrêa =

Brazilian marine zoologist

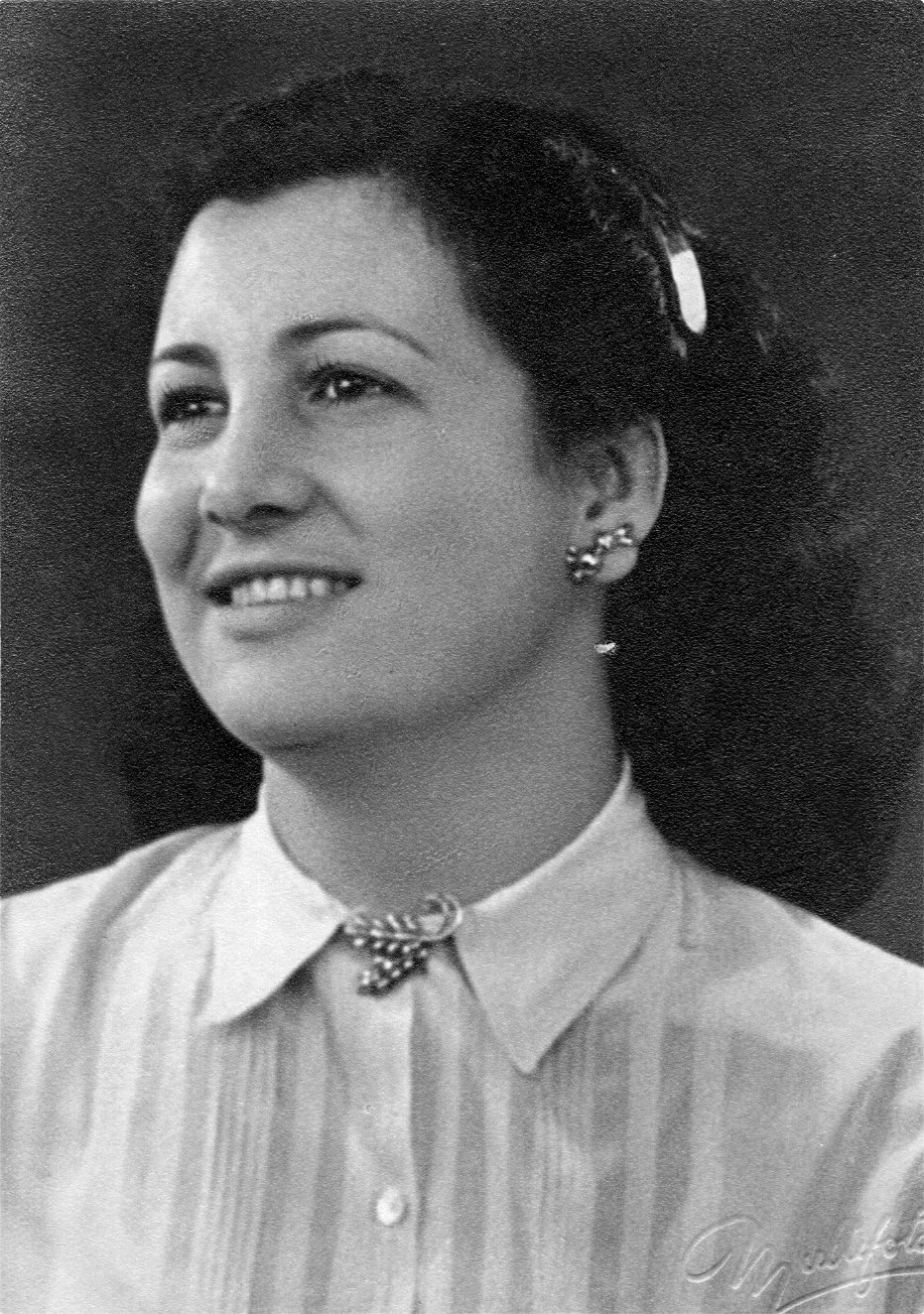
- Diva Diniz Corrêa in 1958
- Born: Diva Diniz Corrêa; 10 May 1918; Avaré
- Died: 28 April 1993 (aged 74); São Paulo, Brazil
- Scientific career
- Fields: Zoology
- Workplaces: University of São Paulo
- Author abbrev. (zoology): Corrêa

Diva Diniz Corrêa (10 May 1918 – 28 April 1993) was a Brazilian marine zoologist.

== Life ==
Diva Diniz Corrêa was born in 1918 in Avaré, São Paulo, Brazil, being the younger of three sisters and the only one to attend college.

In 1939, she began her studies in Natural History at the Faculdade de Filosofia, Ciências e Letras of the University of São Paulo. During this time, she worked closely with Ernst Marcus and Eveline Du Bois-Reymond Marcus, becoming good friends with them. After graduating in 1941, she apprenticed with Dr. Ottorino de Fiore di Coprani in the Department of Geology and Paleontology.

From 1943 to 1945, she taught natural history in a country school near São Paulo, where she was then offered a professorship at the University of São Paulo and started to teach courses in Zoology and Physiology. At this time she made several trips to the coast to collect specimens for her classes and her research.

In 1948, Diva completed her doctoral thesis on the embryology of Bugulina flabellata, a bryozoan, and received the highest grade possible from the committee, which was directed by Ernst Marcus and Paul Sawaya. In 1952, she received a fellowship from the University of Padova. She went to the Stazione Zoologica in Naples, Italy, where she studied neurophysiology and locomotion of nemerteans, leading to many papers. In 1957, she received another fellowship, this time from the John Simon Guggenheim Memorial Foundation, to travel to the California Pacific Marine Station of the University of California, which led to the publication of a monograph on the nemerteans of California and Oregon coasts.

From October 1958 to February 1959, Diva had an internship at the Institute of Marine Science, University of Miami and visited the U. S. Virgin Islands. During her time in the United States, Diva developed a taste for Coca-Cola and named a nemertean as Zygonemertes cocacola. In 1962, she had an internship at the Marine Biological Laboratory in Curaçao from a grant given by the Dutch government, resulting in a survey of the nemerteans from the region and the description of a turbellarian.

Later in 1962, Diva returned to the University of São Paulo and was a professor of the Department of Zoology until her retirement in 1988. She occupied the chair that became vacant by the retirement of Prof. Ernst Marcus. From 1963 to 1977, she was the first female director of the Department of Zoology.

== Selected works ==
- Corrêa, D. D. (1947). "A primeira Dolichoplana (Tricladida Terricola) do Brasil". Boletim da Faculdade de Filosofia, Ciências e Letras da Universidade de São Paulo. 12: 57–82.
- Corrêa, D. D. (1953). "Sobre a neurofisiologia locomotora de hoplonemertinos e a taxonomia de Ototyphlonemertes". Anais da Academia Brasileira de Ciências. 25: 545–555.
- Corrêa, D. D. (1953). "Sobre a locomoção e a neurofisiologia de nemertinos". Boletim da Faculdade de Filosofia, Ciências e Letras da Universidade de São Paulo. 18: 129–147.
- Corrêa, D. D. (1954). "Nemertinos do litoral Brasileiro". Boletim da Faculdade de Filosofia, Ciências e Letras da Universidade de São Paulo. 19 (19): 1–122. doi:10.11606/issn.2526-3382.bffclzoologia.1954.120084.
- Corrêa, D. D. (1956). "Estudo de nemertinos Mediterraneos (Palaeo e Heteronemertini)". Anais da Academia Brasileira de Ciências. 28: 195–214.
- Corrêa, D. D. (1961). "Nemerteans from Florida and Virgin Islands". B Mar Sci Gulf Carib. 11: 1–44.
- Corrêa, D. D. (1963). "Nemerteans from Curaçao". Study of the Fauna of Curaçao and Other Caribbean Islands. 17: 41–56.
- Corrêa, D. D. (1964). "Nemerteans from California and Oregon". Proc Calif Acad Sci. 31: 515–558.

== Taxa named in her honor ==
Several taxa were named after Diva Diniz Correa, such as the turbellaria genus Dinizia, the nemertean genera Divanella and Correanemertes, and the gastropod species Piseinotecus divae.
