= Sibon manzanaresi =

Conservation status
- Near Threatened (IUCN 3.1)

Scientific classification
- Kingdom: Animalia
- Phylum: Chordata
- Class: Reptilia
- Order: Squamata
- Suborder: Serpentes
- Family: Colubridae
- Genus: Sibon
- Species: S. manzanaresi

Binomial name
- Sibon manzanaresi McCranie, 2007

Species of snake

Sibon manzanaresi is a species of snake in the subfamily Dipsadinae of the family Colubridae. The species is endemic to Honduras.

== Etymology ==
The specific name, manzanaresi, is in honor of Tomás Manzanares Ruiz who collected the holotype.

== Geographic range ==
Sibon manzanaresi is found in northeastern Honduras, in Gracias a Dios Department.

== Habitat ==
The preferred natural habitat of Sibon manzanaresi is forest, at altitudes of 40–300 m (130–980 ft).

== Behavior ==
Sibon manzanaresi is arboreal and nocturnal.

== Diet ==
Sibon manzanaresi preys upon snails.

== Reproduction ==
Sibon manzanaresi is oviparous.

== Taxonomy ==
Sibon manzanaresi is a member of the Sibon annulatus species group.
