= Sibon perissostichon =

Conservation status
- Data Deficient (IUCN 3.1)

Scientific classification
- Kingdom: Animalia
- Phylum: Chordata
- Class: Reptilia
- Order: Squamata
- Suborder: Serpentes
- Family: Colubridae
- Genus: Sibon
- Species: S. perissostichon

Binomial name
- Sibon perissostichon G. Köhler, Lotzkat, & Hertz, 2010

Species of snake

Sibon perissostichon is a species of snake in the family, Colubridae. It is found in Panama.
