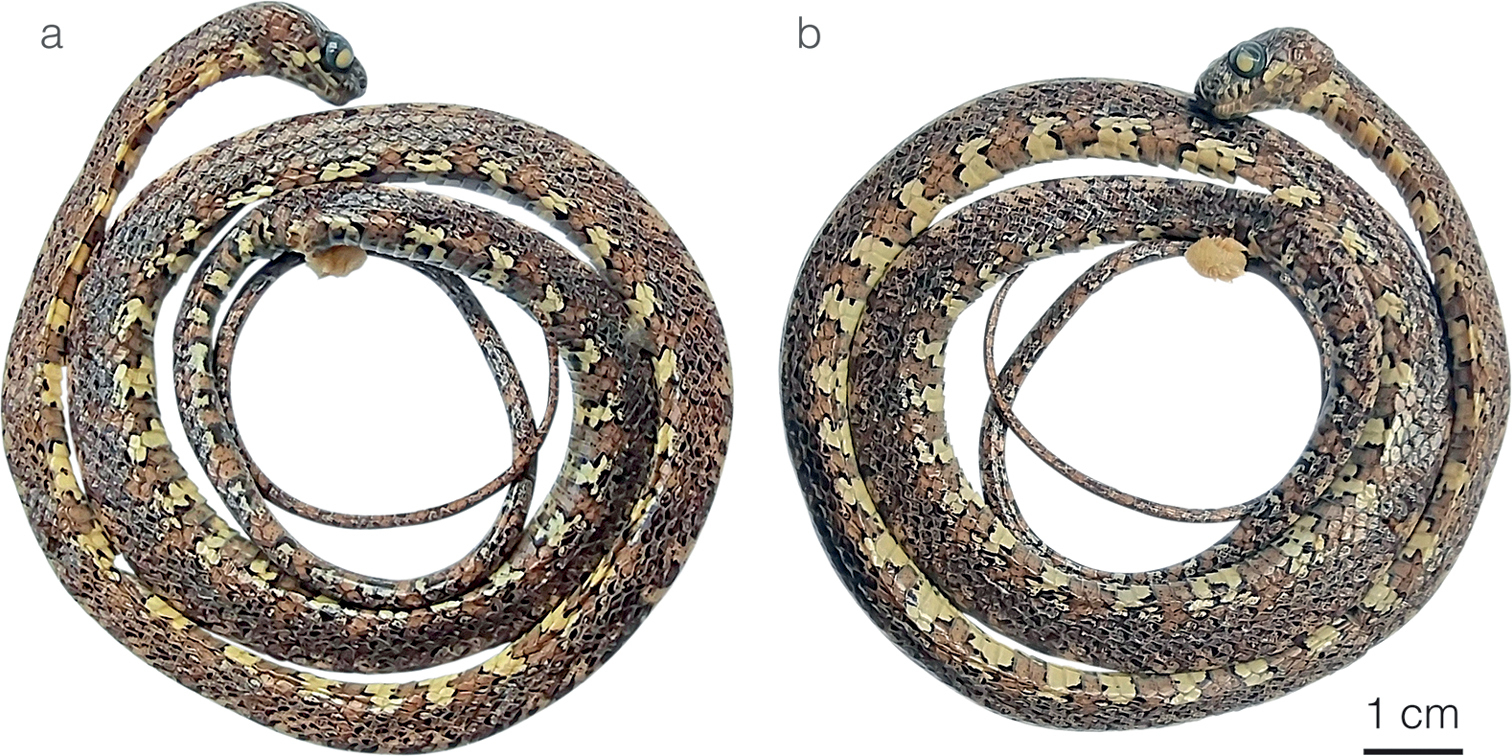

Scientific classification
- Kingdom: Animalia
- Phylum: Chordata
- Class: Reptilia
- Order: Squamata
- Suborder: Serpentes
- Family: Colubridae
- Genus: Sibon
- Species: S. irmelindicaprioae

Binomial name
- Sibon irmelindicaprioae Arteaga and Batista, 2023

= Sibon irmelindicaprioae =

Species of snake

Sibon irmelindicaprioae is a species of nonvenomous snake in the subfamily Dipsadinae. It is endemic to Panama. It was discovered by Ecuadorian biologist Alejandro Arteaga and Panamanian biologist Abel Batista in 2023. Sibon irmelindicaprioae belongs to the genus Sibon, and subfamily Dipsadinae. It is also called DiCaprio's snail-eating snake.

This snake is found in the Chocó-Darién Gap forests of eastern Panama and western Colombia. Its habitat is the humid tropical climate. DiCaprio's Snail-eating snake was found foraging on shrubs, trees and palm fronds 200–300 cm above the ground. The S. irmelindicaprioae is named after Leonardo DiCaprio and his mother Irmelin Indenbirken. This snake hides their head and gives off a pungent odor to repel predators.

This snake is genetically similar to other snakes, but is different enough to qualify as a new species. It is described as red-eyed with vibrant brown and white striped skin. When threatened, it hides its head and releases a musky odor to ward off predators.

This snake is currently threatened by gold and copper mining. Arteaga and Batista describes this snake as "near threatened" based on the IUCN's Red List criteria. As of 2023 only 54% of its habitat remains.
