= Sibon miskitus =

Conservation status
- Near Threatened (IUCN 3.1)

Scientific classification
- Kingdom: Animalia
- Phylum: Chordata
- Class: Reptilia
- Order: Squamata
- Suborder: Serpentes
- Family: Colubridae
- Genus: Sibon
- Species: S. miskitus

Binomial name
- Sibon miskitus McCranie, 2006

Species of snake

Sibon miskitus is a species of snake in the family, Colubridae. It is found in Honduras.
