= Sibon carri =

Conservation status
- Vulnerable (IUCN 3.1)

Scientific classification
- Kingdom: Animalia
- Phylum: Chordata
- Class: Reptilia
- Order: Squamata
- Suborder: Serpentes
- Family: Colubridae
- Genus: Sibon
- Species: S. carri

Binomial name
- Sibon carri (Shreve, 1951)

Species of snake

Sibon carri, also known as Carr's snail sucker, is a species of snake in the family, Colubridae. It is found in Guatemala, Honduras, and El Salvador.
