= Megaceras briansaltini =

Scientific classification
- Kingdom: Animalia
- Phylum: Arthropoda
- Clade: Pancrustacea
- Class: Insecta
- Order: Coleoptera
- Suborder: Polyphaga
- Infraorder: Scarabaeiformia
- Family: Scarabaeidae
- Subfamily: Dynastinae
- Tribe: Oryctini
- Genus: Megaceras
- Species: M. briansaltini

Binomial name
- Megaceras briansaltini Ratcliffe, 2007

Species of beetle

Megaceras briansaltini, named in honor of Brian Saltin, son of entomologist Jochen-P. Saltin, is a Peruvian rhinoceros beetle with a horn surprisingly similar to that of the character Dim from Pixar's animated film, A Bug's Life (created eight years before the beetle's discovery), previously unseen in nature (coined the Dim Effect by its discoverer Brett C. Ratcliffe). It remains unclear whether this is a natural feature or an uncommon mutation, as only one specimen has been found.

M. briansaltini was listed ninth in the top species of 2008 by the International Institute for Species Exploration.
