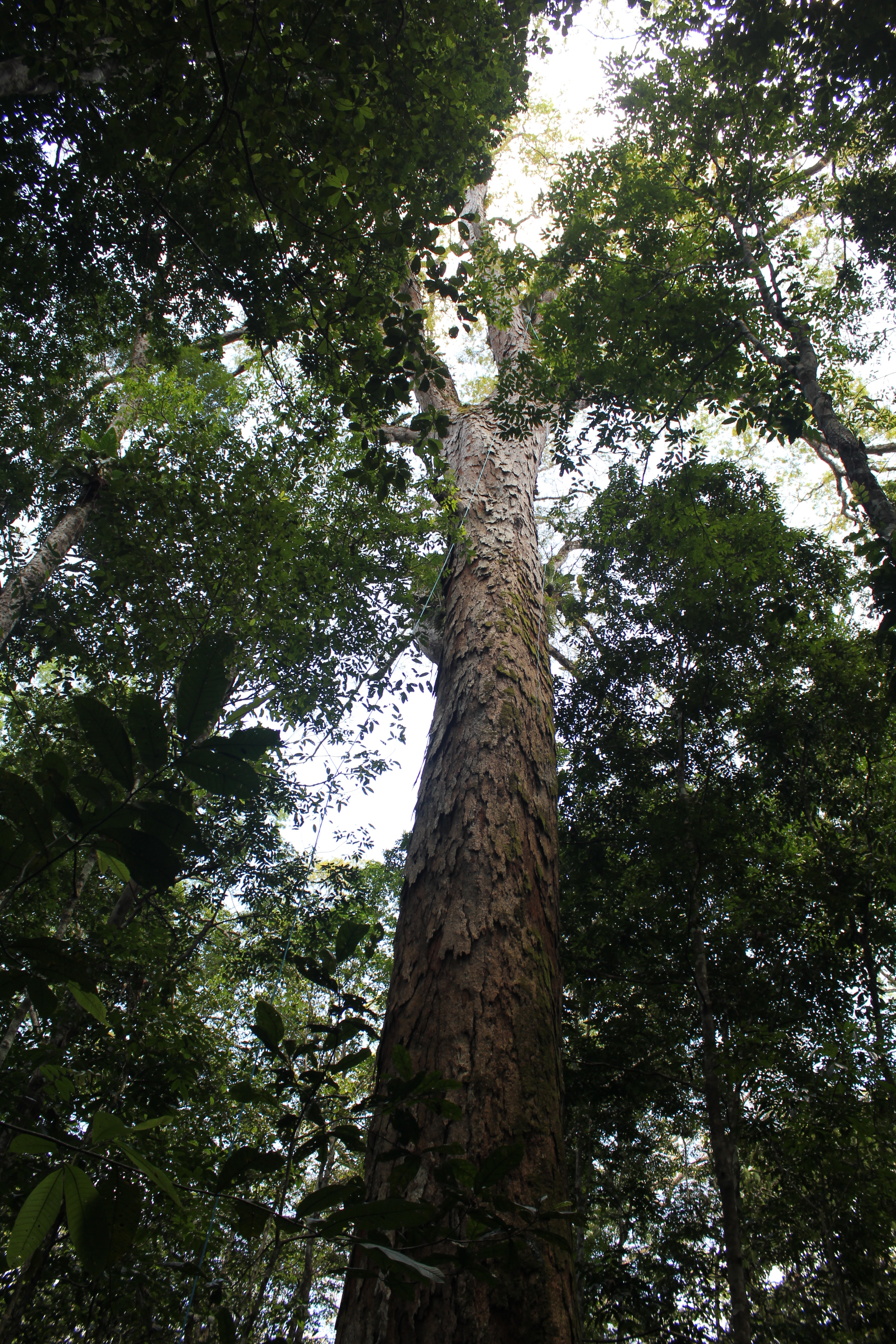

Conservation status
- Least Concern (IUCN 3.1)

Scientific classification
- Kingdom: Plantae
- Clade: Embryophytes
- Clade: Tracheophytes
- Clade: Angiosperms
- Clade: Eudicots
- Clade: Rosids
- Order: Fabales
- Family: Fabaceae
- Subfamily: Caesalpinioideae
- Genus: Dinizia
- Species: D. excelsa

Binomial name
- Dinizia excelsa Ducke

= Dinizia excelsa =

Species of legume

Dinizia excelsa is a South American canopy-emergent tropical rainforest tree species in the family Fabaceae, native to primarily Brazil and Guyana. The tallest tree in the Amazon rainforest is a specimen of Dinizia excelsa.

== Names ==
In Portuguese it is known as angelim vermelho (lit. "red angelim"), angelim, angelim pedra (also the name for Hymenolobium excelsum), and paricá; sometimes also angelim falso, faveira, faveira dura, faveira ferro or faveiro do grande. In Trio it is called awaraimë. In Wapisiana it is called parakwa.

== Description ==
It is the tallest-growing species in the pea family, Fabaceae and one of the tallest tropical tree species in any family, reaching 60 m (200 ft) and taller. The unarmed trunk is cylindrical, the bole of larger specimens 15–22.5 m (49–74 ft), up to 3 m (9.8 ft) in diameter at soil level. The DBH of mature specimens is typically between 80 and 200 cm (31 and 79 in), moderately to strongly buttressed, the buttresses to 4–5 m (13–16 ft) tall.

The heartwood is reddish brown with a slightly paler sapwood. The wood is durable and difficult to work with due to its density and irregular grain. The wood gives off a very strong and foul odor, which can persist for years, especially after rain. The smell is often compared to 'cat urine' or 'smelly feet'. This is due to the presence of butyric acid in the wood, and this greatly reduces the number of applications for which the wood can be used.

Its fruits consist of large, flat and woody legume pods, which contains several seeds. The pods/fruits are dispersed by wind. The seeds are secondarily dispersed by rodents or other mammals. The seeds are also eaten a lot by macaws and other parrot species.

== Distribution and habitat ==
It is found in Guyana, Suriname and Amazonia Brazil (in the northern and central-western states of Amapa, Amazonas, Mato Grosso, Para, Rondonia, Roraima and Tocantins). Also recorded from the state of Acre by Lorenzi (1992). The species seems to be absent in the Western Amazon.

The species grows in non-inundated moist and upland mixed forests known as "floresta ombrofila mista", tropical forest on "terra firme", tropical upland evergreen forest, and tropical dry forest. It has been recorded at elevations from 50 to 490 m (160 to 1,610 ft).

== Tallest tree ==
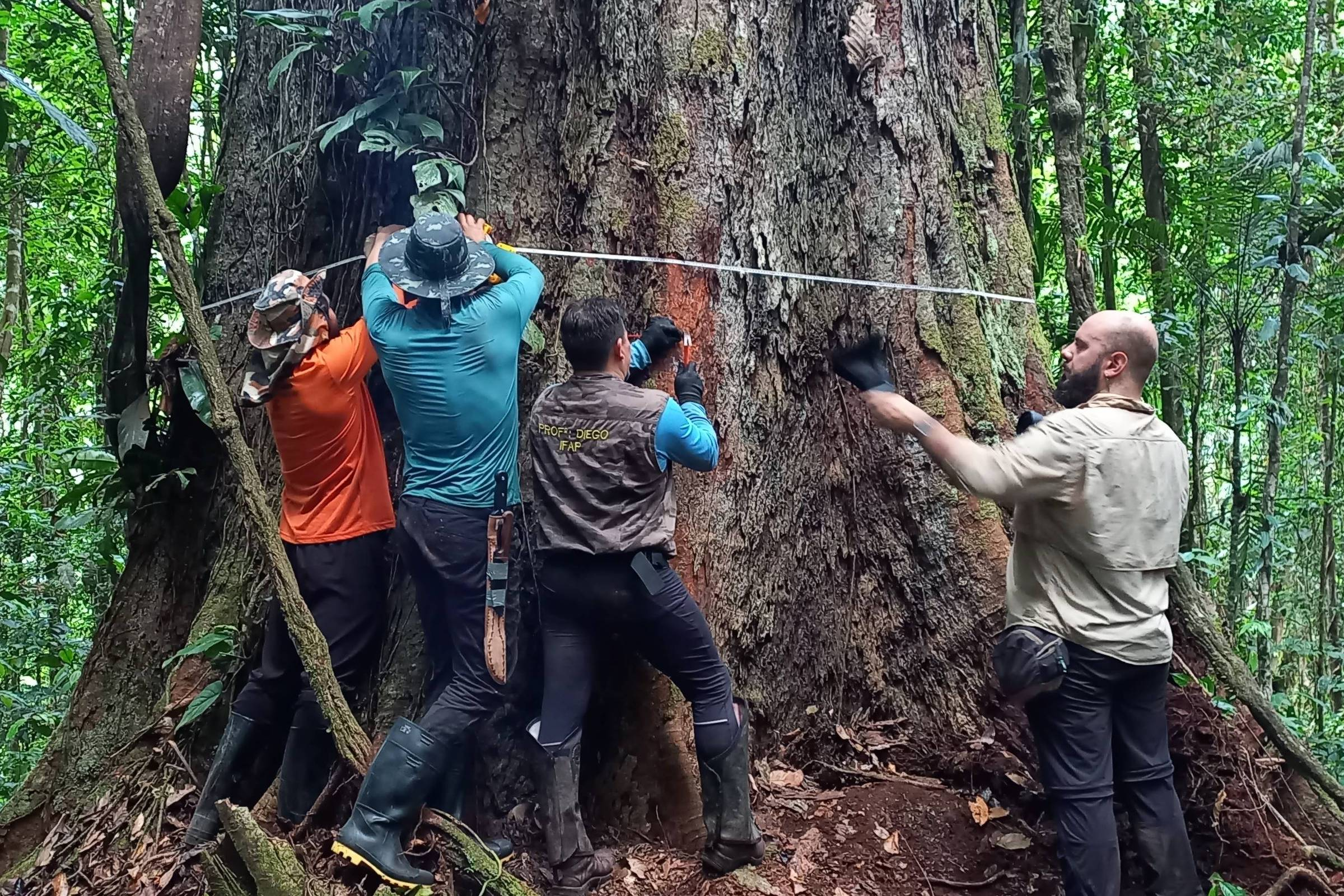
Scientists measure the circumference of the 88.5 meter tall Angelim Vermelho. Notice the bark breaking off in woody plates, which is typical for this species.

The tallest measured specimen is 88.5 m (290 ft) with a circumference of 9.9 m (32 ft), which is believed to be about 400 years old, discovered near Jari River in Inipuku (municipality of Almeirim, Para state) in 2019. It is the largest tree of South and Central America, and also the largest broad-leaf tree of all the Americas. The discovery was made using airborne laser scanning (ALS) and field verification in Paru State Forest, which is shared by the Brazilian Amazon basin states of Amapa and Para. On 7 October 2022, a group of researchers after several failed attempts managed to reach the tree and measured a circumference of 9.9 m (32 ft).

The record breaking specimen was found in the 22 million-hectare (54.3 million-acre) Paru State Forest, which is part of an extremely remote area of the southern Guiana Shield. In 2024, 560,000-hectares (1.38-million-acres) of the area where the record-breaking giant and other giant trees have been found, has been upgraded to the "full protection" or State Park category. The newly created conservation area has been called the Giant Trees of the Amazon State Park. This means that activities like logging, permitted under the "sustainable use" category when it was previously part of Paru State Park, can no longer be proposed in its bounds. Although the area is still completely preserved, and no logging has been documented thus far in the new conservation area, the move will future-proof the area against potential threats. Scientific research and ecotourism will be allowed in the Giant Trees of the Amazon State Park, which would also generate revenue.

== See also ==
- List of superlative trees § Tallest
