= Sibon linearis =

Conservation status
- Data Deficient (IUCN 3.1)

Scientific classification
- Kingdom: Animalia
- Phylum: Chordata
- Class: Reptilia
- Order: Squamata
- Suborder: Serpentes
- Family: Colubridae
- Genus: Sibon
- Species: S. linearis

Binomial name
- Sibon linearis Pérez-Higareda, López-Luna, & H.M. Smith, 2002

Species of snake

Sibon linearis, the lined snail sucker, is a species of snake in the family, Colubridae. It is found in Mexico.
