= Liropus minusculus =

Scientific classification
- Domain: Eukaryota
- Kingdom: Animalia
- Phylum: Arthropoda
- Class: Malacostraca
- Order: Amphipoda
- Family: Caprellidae
- Genus: Liropus
- Species: L. minusculus

Binomial name
- Liropus minusculus Guerra-García and Hendrycks, 2013

Species of crustacean

Liropus minusculus is as species of skeleton shrimp found in a reef cave off the coast of Catalina Island, California. It is the only member of Liropus known from the Northeast Pacific Ocean.

== Description ==
Like all members of Caprellidae, Liropus minusculus have slender, translucent bodies that make them look like living skeletons. The coloration helps them camouflage in with their surroundings, resembling seaweed or other vegetation. They are very small, measuring only about 3.3 millimetres (0.13 in) in length, and smallest of the nine species of Liropus.

Liropus minusculus is a predator that remains still, clinging to rocks or plants, until prey approaches. Males have claw-like gnathopods which are used during mating to grasp the female. Females have smaller gnathopods. L. minusculus is distinguishable from other members of Liropus primarily from the shape of its torso and abdominal limbs.

In May 2014, the International Institute for Species Exploration listed L. minusculus as one of the "Top 10 News Species" named in 2013.

== Habitat ==
Liropus minusculus is known from specimens collected from in a cave about 30 metres (98 ft) below the surface of the ocean. The cave is located in Isthmus Reef, off the coast of Catalina Island, California. L. minusculus is the only known member of Liropus that lives in the northeast Pacific Ocean.

== Discovery and taxonomic history ==
While visiting the Canadian Museum of Nature, University of Seville researcher José Manuel Guerra-García and colleague Ed Hendrycks (from CMN) recognized that two specimens – one male and one female – found in the museums collections were examples of a previously unknown species. They formally described the new species as Liropus minusculus in the October 8, 2013 issue of Zootaxa. The specific name is a reference to the species' tiny size.
