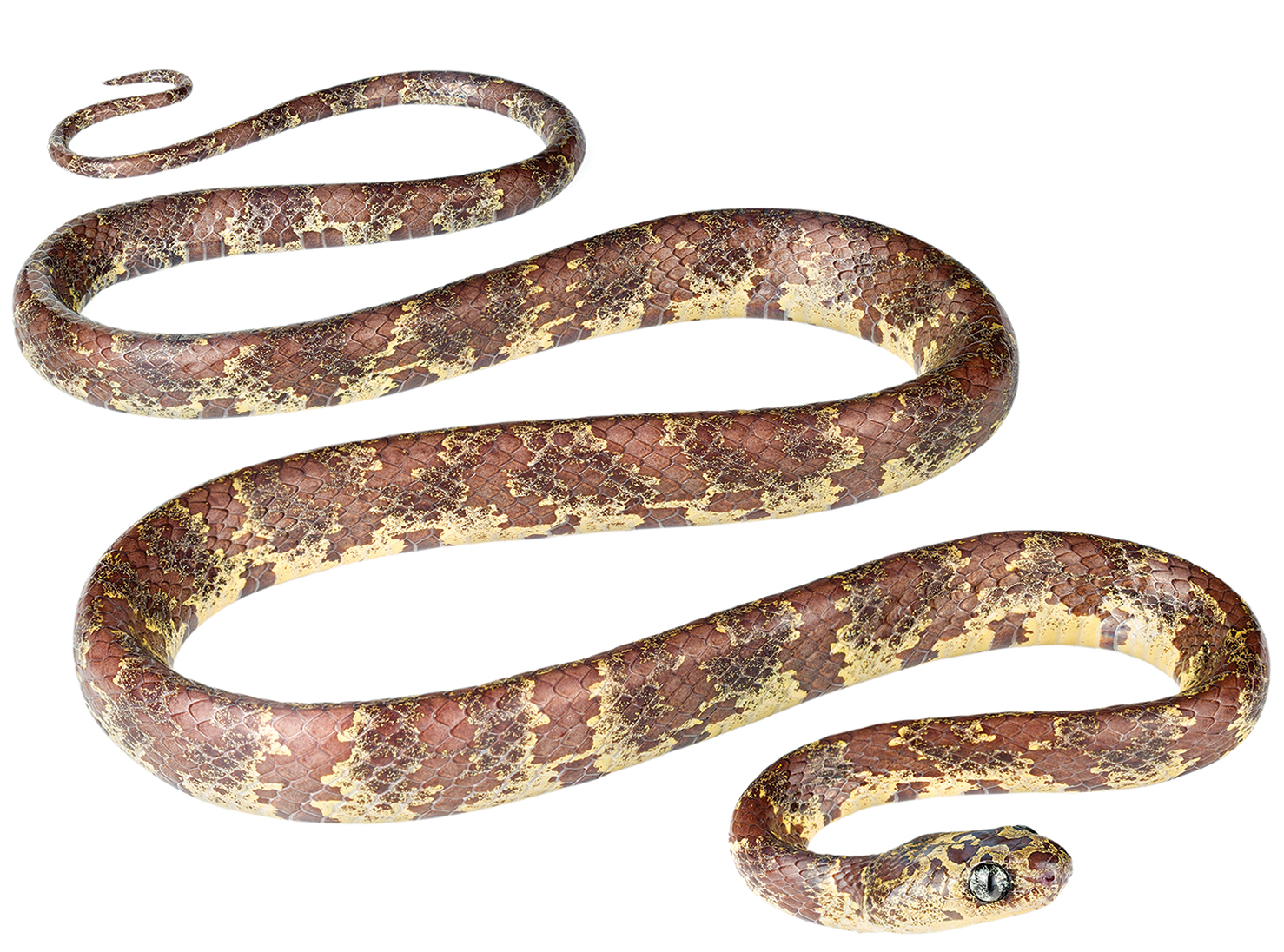

Scientific classification
- Kingdom: Animalia
- Phylum: Chordata
- Class: Reptilia
- Order: Squamata
- Suborder: Serpentes
- Family: Colubridae
- Genus: Sibon
- Species: S. bevridgelyi

Binomial name
- Sibon bevridgelyi Arteaga, Salazar-Valenzuela, Mebert, Peñafiel, Aguiar, Sánchez-Nivicela, Pyron, Colston, Cisneros-Heredia, Yánez-Muñoz, Venegas, Guayasamin, & Torres-Carvajal, 2018

= Sibon bevridgelyi =

Species of snake

Sibon bevridgelyi, also known as Bev Ridgely's snail-eater, is a species of snake in the family, Colubridae. It is found in Ecuador and Peru.
