= Sibon merendonensis =

Conservation status
- Critically Endangered (IUCN 3.1)

Scientific classification
- Kingdom: Animalia
- Phylum: Chordata
- Class: Reptilia
- Order: Squamata
- Suborder: Serpentes
- Family: Colubridae
- Genus: Sibon
- Species: S. merendonensis

Binomial name
- Sibon merendonensis Rovito, Papenfuss & Vásquez-Almazan, 2012

Species of snake

Sibon merendonensis is a species of colubrid snakes. The species is endemic to Sierra del Merendón in Guatemala.
