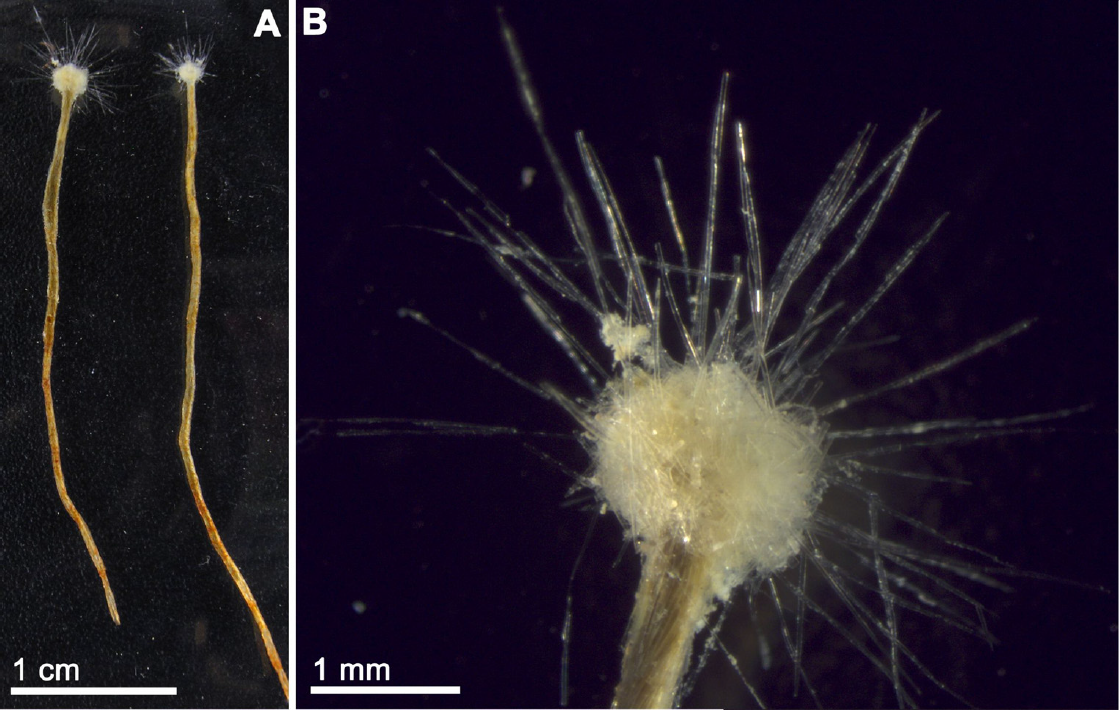

Scientific classification
- Domain: Eukaryota
- (unranked): SAR
- (unranked): Rhizaria
- Superphylum: Retaria
- Phylum: Foraminifera
- Class: Monothalamea
- Order: Astrorhizida
- Family: Stegnamminidae
- Genus: Spiculosiphon
- Species: S. oceana

Binomial name
- Spiculosiphon oceana (Maldonado, 2013)

= Spiculosiphon oceana =

Species of single-celled organism

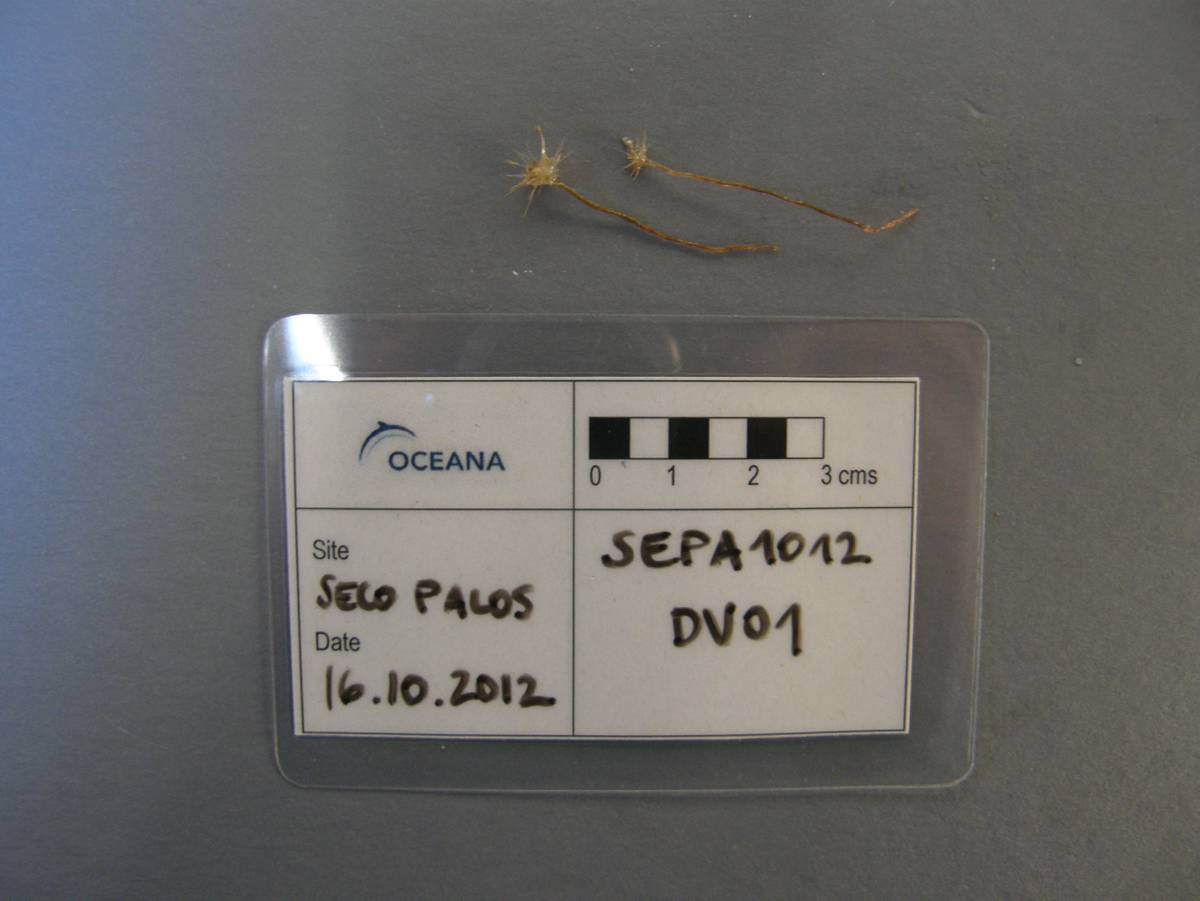
Type specimens of Spiculosiphon oceana

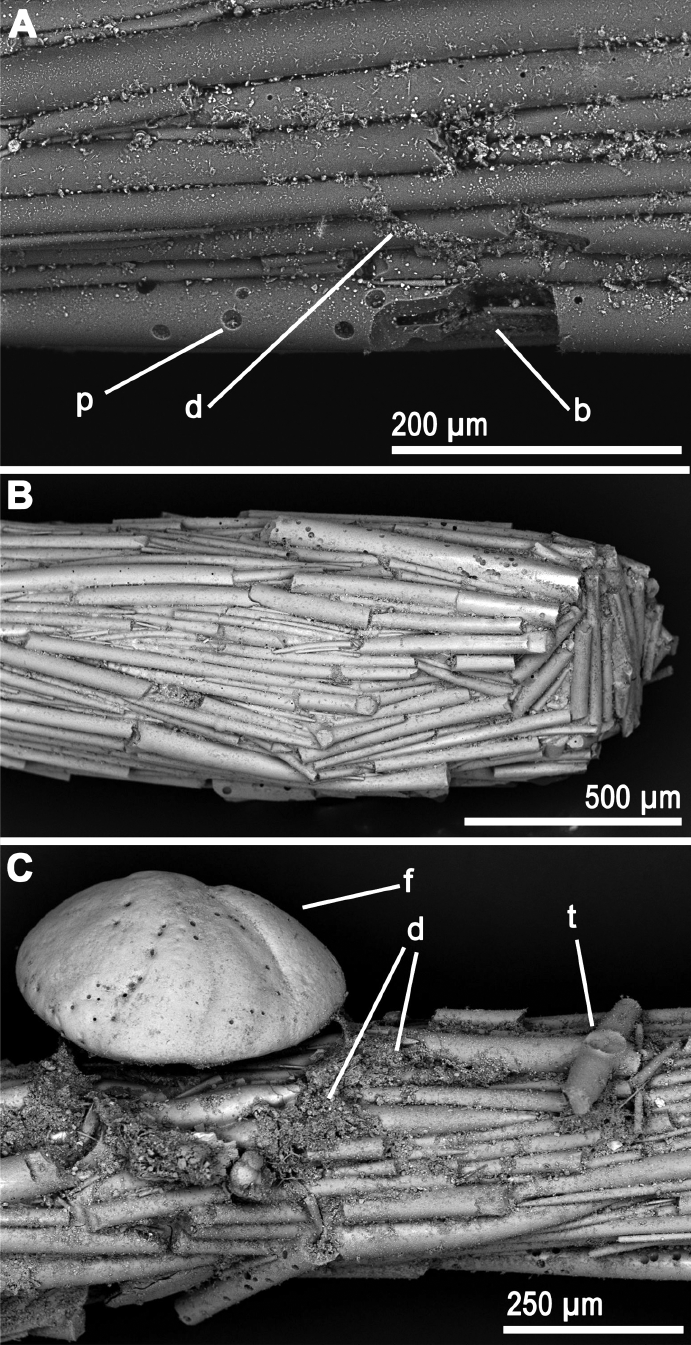
SEM images of sponge spicules covering the stalks of S. oceana

Spiculosiphon oceana is a giant species of foraminifera (a phylum of unicellular eukaryotes). Its appearance and lifestyle mimics that of a sponge. It was discovered in 2013 in underwater caves 30 miles off the coast of Spain.

== Description ==
At (4 to 5 centimetres (1.6 to 2.0 in)) long, Spiculosiphon oceana is the largest foraminifera found in the Mediterranean. The species creates a test (shell) made out of sponge spicules, "gluing" them together with a protein it secretes, much like sponges do. The spicules it uses are carefully selected and laid parallel to the main stalk of the creature. Because of its large size and its appearance, S. oceana was originally mistaken as a multi-cellular animal from the sponge family.

Spiculosiphon oceana lives on the sea floor. It lies in wait and extends its pseudopods outside its shell to capture prey, primarily plankton, that get trapped on the spicules of its shell. Thus, it captures prey much in the same way as carnivorous sponges. In addition to the visual and lifestyle similarities of S. oceana and sponges, the creatures live in similar habitats. Thus, it is likely a case on convergent evolution dictated by the environmental constraints.

In May 2014, The International Institute for Species Exploration selected S. oceana as one of the Top 10 New Species of the previous year.

== Discovery and taxonomic history ==
Spiculosiphon oceana was on the Seco de Palos seamount, 30 miles (48 km) southeast of Spain. It was formally described in the June 10, 2013 issue of Zootaxa. The specific name is a reference to the non-profit group Oceana who co-discovered the species with Centro de Estudios Avanzados de Blanes (CEAB-CSIC).

Spiculosiphon oceana is the second species of Spiculosiphon, the first being Spiculosiphon radiata. S. oceana is roughly twice the size of its sister species, which was found in Norway.
