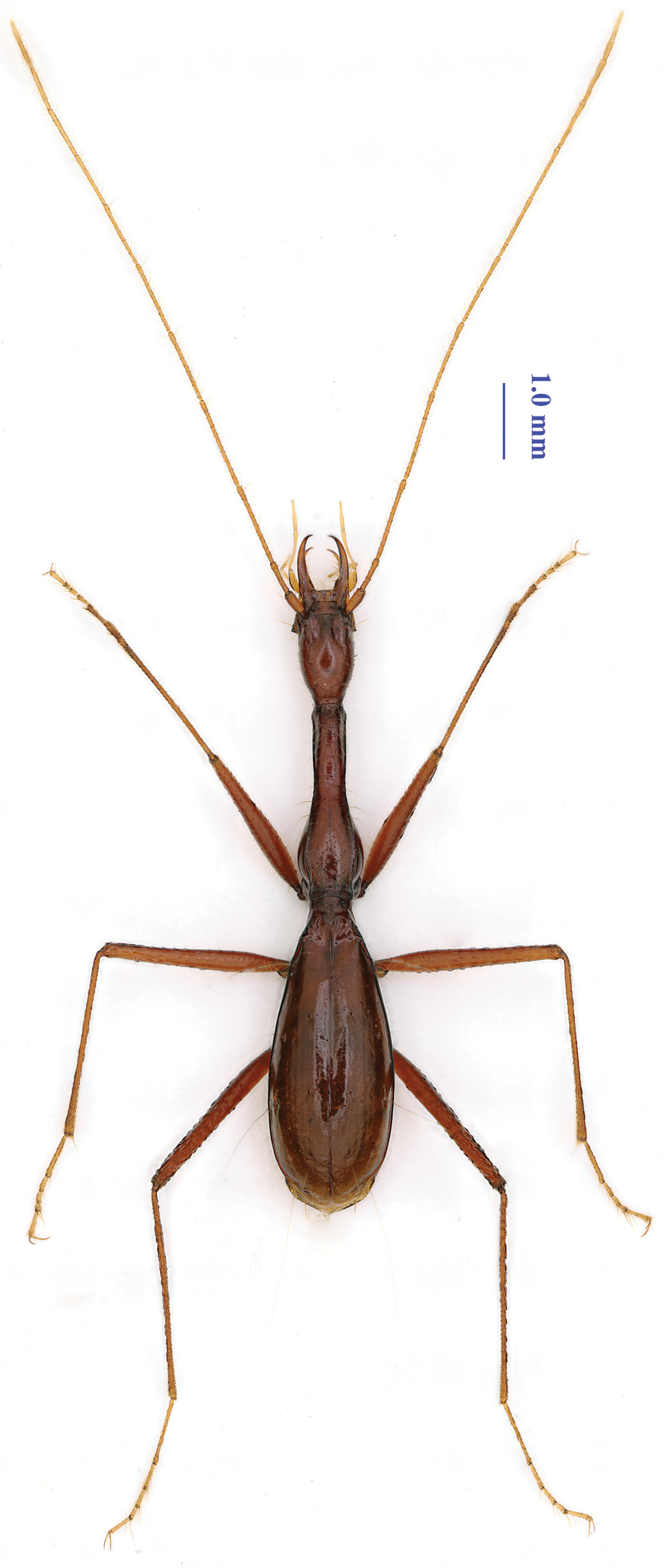
- Holotype (male)

Conservation status
- Data Deficient (IUCN 3.1)

Scientific classification
- Kingdom: Animalia
- Phylum: Arthropoda
- Class: Insecta
- Order: Coleoptera
- Suborder: Adephaga
- Family: Carabidae
- Subfamily: Trechinae
- Genus: Xuedytes; Tian & Huang, 2017
- Species: X. bellus

Binomial name
- Xuedytes bellus Tian & Huang, 2017

= Xuedytes =

Genus of beetles

Xuedytes is a monotypic genus of ground beetle in the subfamily Trechinae. The sole species is Xuedytes bellus, which is only known from a single karst cave in Du'an Yao Autonomous County, Guangxi Province, China.

This species may be "the most extremely cave-adapted trechine" beetle in the world, morphologically adapted to life in the darkness of the caves of southern China. It lacks flight wings, eyes, and pigmentation. Its physical characteristics most resemble the beetle genera Giraffahaenops and Dongodytes. Like Giraffahaenops, Xuedytes bellus has a thin and elongated body. However, its elytra are similar to those of Dongodytes. The genus Xuedytes differs from both of the aforementioned genera in its prothorax, which is longer than its head, its narrow elytra, and the right mandibular tooth that is edentate. Xuedytes are generally 8.3–9.0 mm in length when measured from the apex of the right mandible to the elytral apex and 1.4–1.5 mm in width. It is characterized as having a yellowish brown body, with tarsi, palps, and antennae pale, and a strongly shining head.

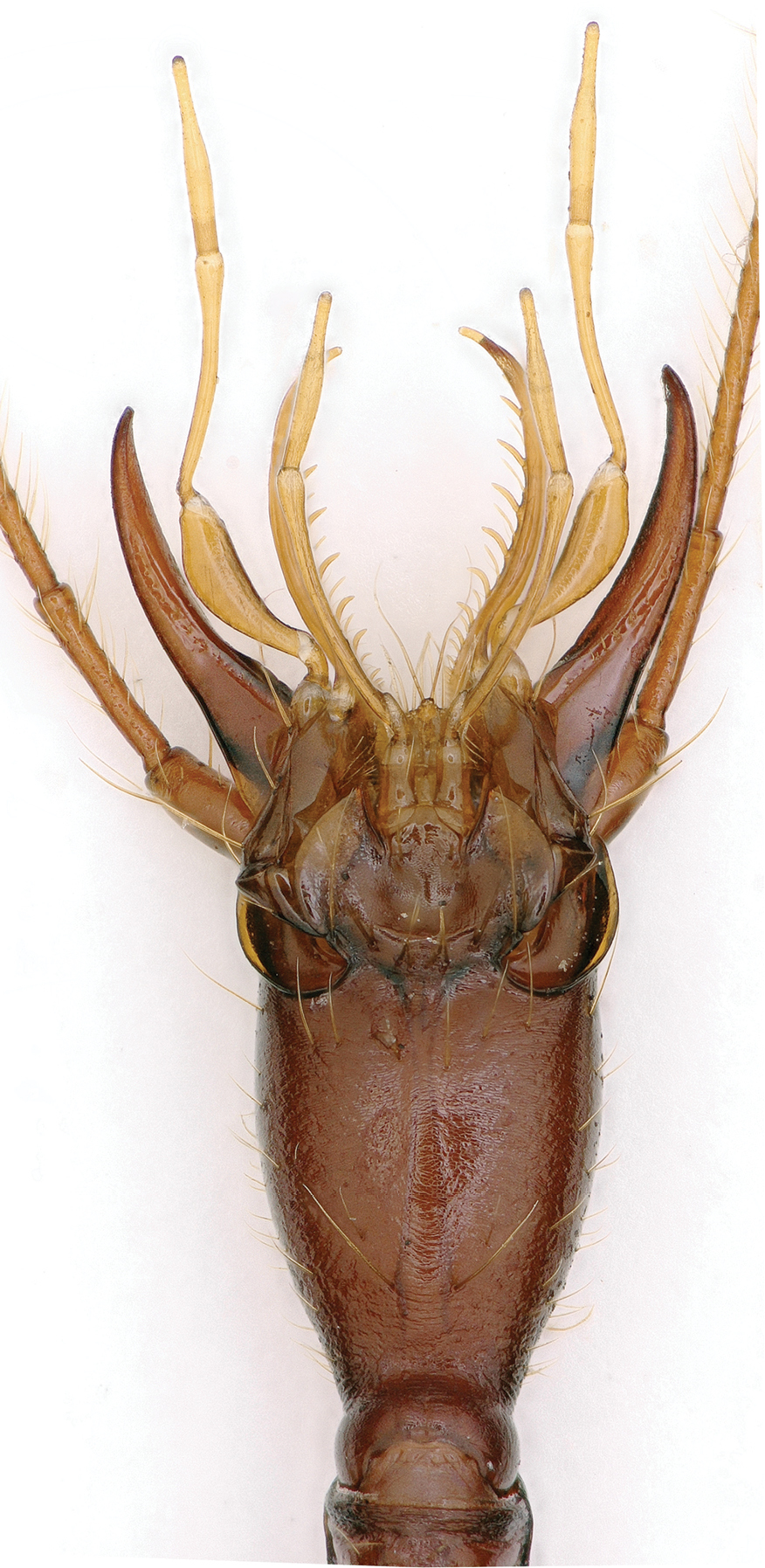
Head of a female
