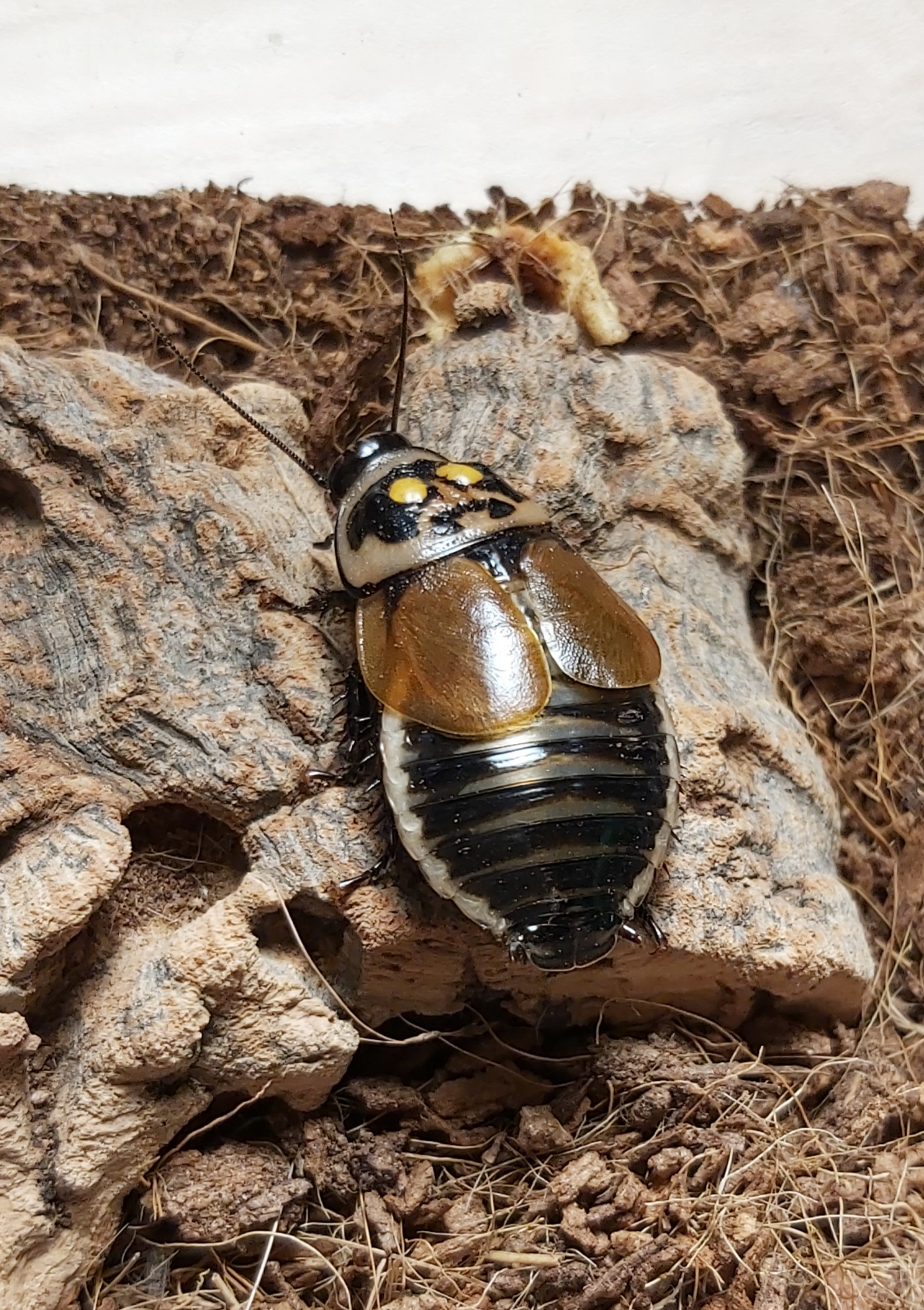
- Male
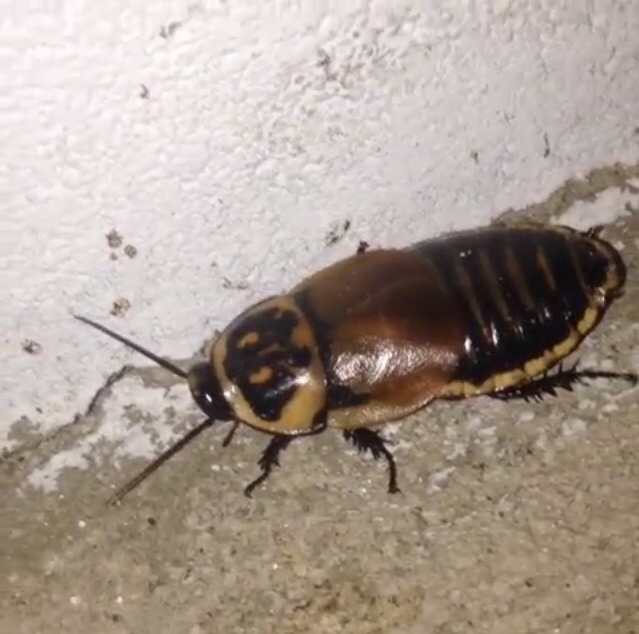
- Female

Scientific classification
- Kingdom: Animalia
- Phylum: Arthropoda
- Clade: Pancrustacea
- Class: Insecta
- Order: Blattodea
- Family: Blaberidae
- Genus: Lucihormetica
- Species: L. verrucosa

Binomial name
- Lucihormetica verrucosa (Brunner von Wattenwyl, 1865)

= Lucihormetica verrucosa =

Species of cockroach

Lucihormetica verrucosa is a species of giant cockroach in the family Blaberidae, commonly known as the warty glowspot cockroach. It is native to Venezuela and Colombia.

== Description ==
L. verrucosa grows to a length of about 4 cm (1.6 in) and is mainly black or dark brown with a white margin to the dorsal sclerites. It is sexually dimorphic, with males being slightly smaller than females and having a pair of large, usually yellow spots on the pronotum. These are covered by a thin translucent cuticle and have traditionally been thought to be luminescent organs. However researchers noticed that when in captivity these cockroaches were fed on carrots, the colour of the spots deepened to orange or even red. On closer examination the surface of the cuticle bears a number of small knobs each bearing a small mechanoreceptor. The upper surface of the spots is partially obscured by a pad of enlarged fat body cells which accumulate carotenoids on a diet of carrots. Insects are unable to synthesize carotenoids, and the presence of orange or red spots may indicate a well-fed, fit individual. The theory of bioluminescence occurring in Blattodea has been refuted multiple times supposed sightings were likely mistaken, or the animals might have suffered a deadly infection of Photorhabdus luminescens. It is hypothesized that the pigmented spots may play a part in male aggression or mate choice by the female, or may provide warning signals, though autofluorescence has been documented, such that the spots will glow when exposed to ultraviolet light as is common for arthropod cuticles.

== Distribution ==
L. verrucosa is native to Venezuela and Colombia.

== Behaviour ==
Both sexes of L. verrucosa have short wings but dwell on the ground and are reluctant to fly. It is mainly nocturnal and hides during the day. It is ovoviviparous, the female giving birth to about twenty dark-coloured nymphs 2 to 3 millimetres (0.079 to 0.118 in) long.

Courtship usually starts with the male stimulating the female, first with his antennae then with his palps. He then pursues her, pushes her, tries to climb on her back and raises his wings. She may run away or she may allow herself to be pushed and starts palpating the male's abdomen with her palps, climbs on the male and allows him to grasp her genitalia, dismounts sideways and turns through 180° so that the pair are linked at the tip of the abdomen. Copulation usually lasts for about an hour. Not every courtship resulted in a mating, the female often turns away halfway through or may climb on the back of the male without proceeding to copulation. Unlike other cockroaches such as the Pacific beetle cockroach (Diploptera punctata) and the orange-headed cockroach (Eublaberus posticus), the females are not receptive just after moulting and it is about twenty days later that they become receptive, by which time their cuticle is well-hardened.
