= Sibon lamari =

Conservation status
- Endangered (IUCN 3.1)

Scientific classification
- Kingdom: Animalia
- Phylum: Chordata
- Class: Reptilia
- Order: Squamata
- Suborder: Serpentes
- Family: Colubridae
- Genus: Sibon
- Species: S. lamari

Binomial name
- Sibon lamari Solórzano, 2001

Species of snake

Sibon lamari is a species of snake in the subfamily Dipsadinae of the family Colubridae. The species is native to Central America.

== Etymology ==
The specific name, lamari, is in honor of American herpetologist William Wylly Lamar.

== Geographic range ==
S. lamari is found in Costa Rica and Panama.

== Habitat ==
The preferred natural habitat of S. lamari is forest, at altitudes of 5–650 m (16–2,133 ft).

== Behavior ==
S. lamari is arboreal.

== Diet ==
S. lamari preys upon snails.

== Reproduction ==
S. lamari is oviparous.
