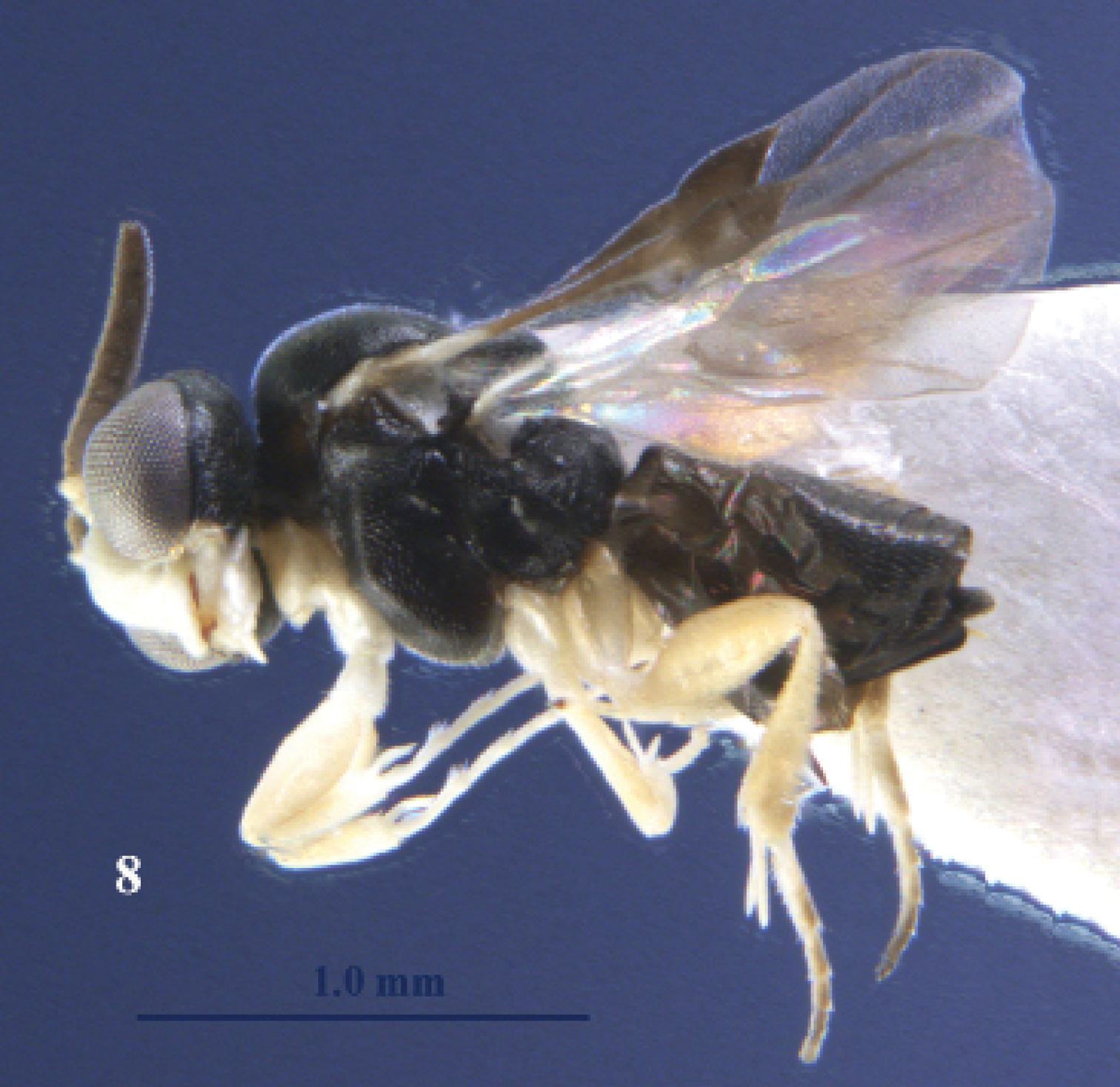

Scientific classification
- Kingdom: Animalia
- Phylum: Arthropoda
- Clade: Pancrustacea
- Class: Insecta
- Order: Hymenoptera
- Family: Braconidae
- Genus: Kollasmosoma
- Species: K. sentum

Binomial name
- Kollasmosoma sentum van Achterberg & Gómez, 2011

= Kollasmosoma sentum =

Species of wasp

Kollasmosoma sentum is a parasitoid wasp in the family Braconidae, which lays its eggs inside adult ants. It was featured as one of "the top 10 new species of 2012" in a list compiled by Conservationists at the Arizona State University International Institute for Species Exploration.

== Distribution ==
Kollasmosoma sentum is a Palearctic species. The first male of K. sentum was discovered in Orgiva in the province of Granada in Spain. The female holotype was discovered later in August 2010 in Madrid, at the site of the Instituto Nacional de Investigación y Tecnología Agraria y Alimentaria followed by the collection of another seven females in September 2010.

== Description ==
Kollasmosoma sentum has a length of 1.8 to 2.1 millimetres (0.071 to 0.083 in) with forewing length from 1.1 to 1.4 millimetres (0.043 to 0.055 in). The antennae of all females have 12 segments. The face is convex and the head is bristly.

Kollasmosoma sentum is black with white features, including the face, clypeus, labrum, malar space (area between the compound eyes and the mandibles), frons (antero-lateral and medial), palps, propleuron, tegulae, basal area of the wing and the front and center legs.

The scape and pedicel of the antenna, and the tarsi of the hind legs are ivory coloured, the tarsi dorsally obscured. The sides of the pronotum have a brown spot laterally; in some individuals the pronotum may be colored brown also extended to the sides. The veins of the nearly transparent wings are brown, the remaining antenna segments, large parts of the humeral plate, the sides of the mesosoma, the parastigma and the pterostigma are colored extended dark brown. The mesosoma is about 10% longer than its height. The first tergite of the metasoma is 0.6 times as long as the width of the apex.

Kollasmosoma sentum can be differentiated from other species of the genus by the following characteristics:

- The outer spine of the tibiae of the hind legs is normally built in females and apically pointed;
- the fifth sternite of the metasoma in females has an apical spine;
- the face is strongly convex;
- the compound eyes are about 3.6 times higher than the temple's width;
- The dorsal side of the propodeum is shorter than the metanotum;
- the pedicel is distinctly pronounced in females; and
- the tarsi of the front legs in the females are 1.9 times as long as the tarsi of the middle legs.

== Behaviour ==
Parasitoidy of the ant Cataglyphis ibericus (Emery, 1906) by K. sentum has been recorded. Female Kollasmosoma wasps, flying singly or in a small group of two to three, scout the entrances of nests of Cataglyphis and areas nearby, during the hottest hours of the day, looking for worker ants on their way out to forage or on the return, laden with food for the nest. These expeditions typically last from half an hour to 90 minutes. Cataglyphis ants move speedily along but have a characteristic pattern of brief halts which are used by the Kollasmosoma for oviposition into the body of the ants.

Cataglyphis ants are wary of these minute parasitoid wasps and, when detected, fend them off using mandibles or with the middle and rear pairs of legs as the wasps appear from the rear. On their part, Kollasmosoma wasps fly rapidly and approach from behind. Cataglyphis ants typically hold their metasoma at an angle which ranges from the horizontal to vertically upward, the latter position being characteristic for the genus. The wasps oviposit on the dorsal or ventral surface of the metasoma, and rarely on the abdominal apex, manoeuvring their body so that the ovipositor thrusts along the posterior-anterior axis of the ant body, a behaviour which suggests that the wasp aims to pierce through the intersegmental membranes.

The oviposition of Cataglyphis ant bodies by female Kollasmosoma wasps is done with great speed, with the complete cycle, comprising first contact, grasping of the ant, and insertion of egg into the metasoma, followed by flight, lasting for an average duration of 0.052 seconds only. (Note: "The whole oviposition behaviour of Kollasmosoma sentum sp. n. (comprising the grasping of the ant by the wasp and the insertion of the ovipositor, until flight; ... lasted a mean of 0.052 seconds (95% confidence interval:...), with a median of 0.050 seconds (interquartile range: 0.047–0.057).") (Note: All this takes "less than a twentieth of a second.")

Popular Science claims it is one of the most efficient of insect "assassins." One observer notes that these wasps may account for ants' "nervous behavior."

It is still unknown how newly hatched wasps survive in the ant colony.
