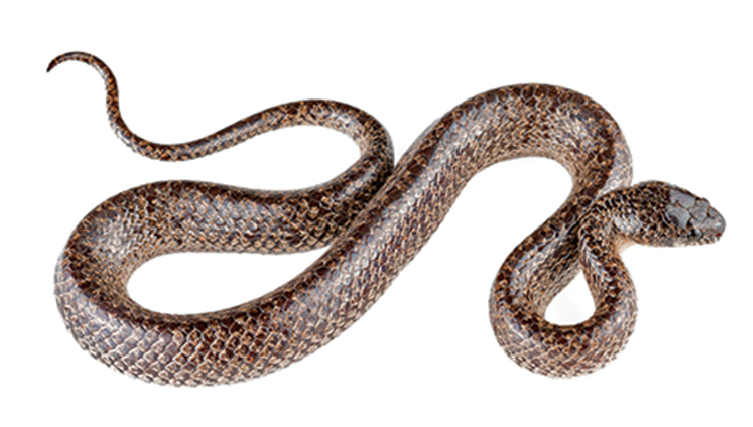

Conservation status
- Data Deficient (IUCN 3.1)

Scientific classification
- Kingdom: Animalia
- Phylum: Chordata
- Class: Reptilia
- Order: Squamata
- Suborder: Serpentes
- Family: Colubridae
- Genus: Sibon
- Species: S. dunni

Binomial name
- Sibon dunni (J. A. Peters, 1957)

= Sibon dunni =

Species of snake

Sibon dunni, also known as Dunn's snail sucker, is a species of snake in the family, Colubridae. It is found in Ecuador.
