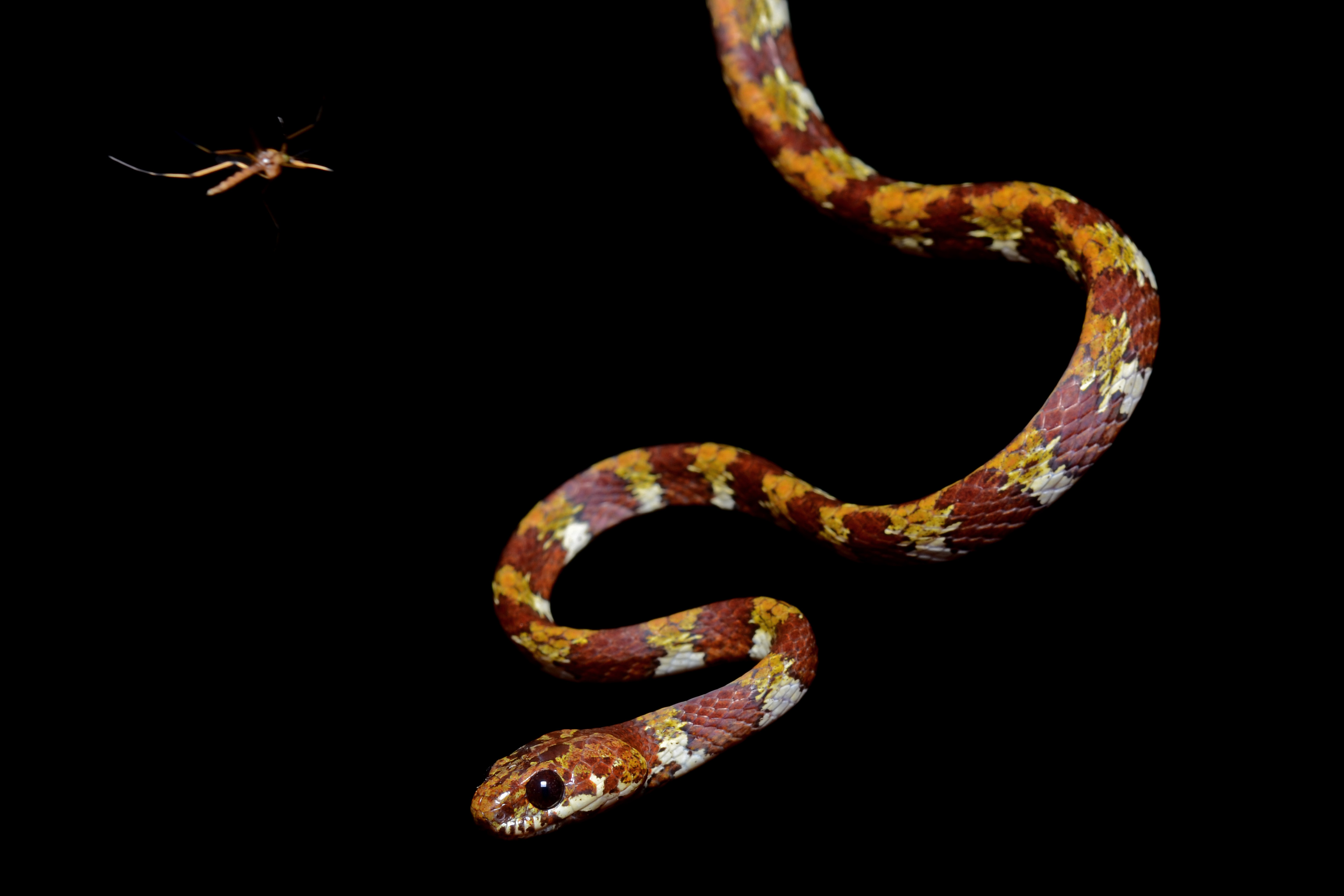

Conservation status
- Least Concern (IUCN 3.1)

Scientific classification
- Kingdom: Animalia
- Phylum: Chordata
- Class: Reptilia
- Order: Squamata
- Suborder: Serpentes
- Family: Colubridae
- Genus: Sibon
- Species: S. longifrenis

Binomial name
- Sibon longifrenis (Stejneger, 1909)

= Sibon longifrenis =

Species of snake

Sibon longifrenis, Stejneger's snail sucker or lichen-colored snail sucker, is a species of snake in the family Colubridae. It is found in Panama, Costa Rica, Honduras and Nicaragua.

The Sibon longifrenis primarily feeds on amphibian eggs, particularly frog eggs, but will also feed on small oligochaetes and mollusks, such as slugs and snails. The absence of amphibian eggs in their diet may result in nutritional deficit and poor body conditions.
