= Sibon ayerbeorum =

Scientific classification
- Kingdom: Animalia
- Phylum: Chordata
- Class: Reptilia
- Order: Squamata
- Suborder: Serpentes
- Family: Colubridae
- Genus: Sibon
- Species: S. ayerbeorum

Binomial name
- Sibon ayerbeorum Vera-Pérez, 2019

Species of snake

Sibon ayerbeorum, also known as the Ayerbes's snail-eater, is a species of snake in the family, Colubridae. It is found in Colombia.
