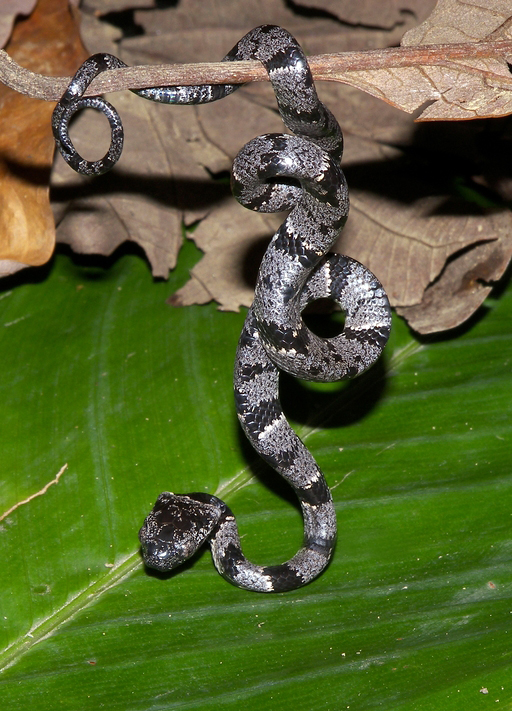

Conservation status
- Least Concern (IUCN 3.1)

Scientific classification
- Kingdom: Animalia
- Phylum: Chordata
- Class: Reptilia
- Order: Squamata
- Suborder: Serpentes
- Family: Colubridae
- Genus: Sibon
- Species: S. nebulatus

Binomial name
- Sibon nebulatus (Linnaeus, 1758)

Synonyms
- Sibon nebulata (Linnaeus, 1758)

= Sibon nebulatus =

Species of snake

Sibon nebulatus, commonly known as the cloudy snail-eating snake, is a species of small, slender arboreal snake which is found in southern Mexico, Central America, northern South America, Isla Margarita, and Trinidad and Tobago.

== Description ==
The body colour of S. nebulatus varies from grey to brown with dark brown irregular ring-like crossbands. These crossbands are edged by fine, irregular, beige spots. The belly ranges from white to beige, speckled with tiny dark brown points. The labial scale on the upper lip behind the eye is enlarged. In cloud forests of northwestern Ecuador, S. nebulatus is often confused with another snake, the Elegant Snail-Eater (Dipsas elegans), which can be distinguished by its pairs of narrow vertical bars between which there is a more pale bar, as opposed to the unpaired vertical bars of S. nebulatus.
