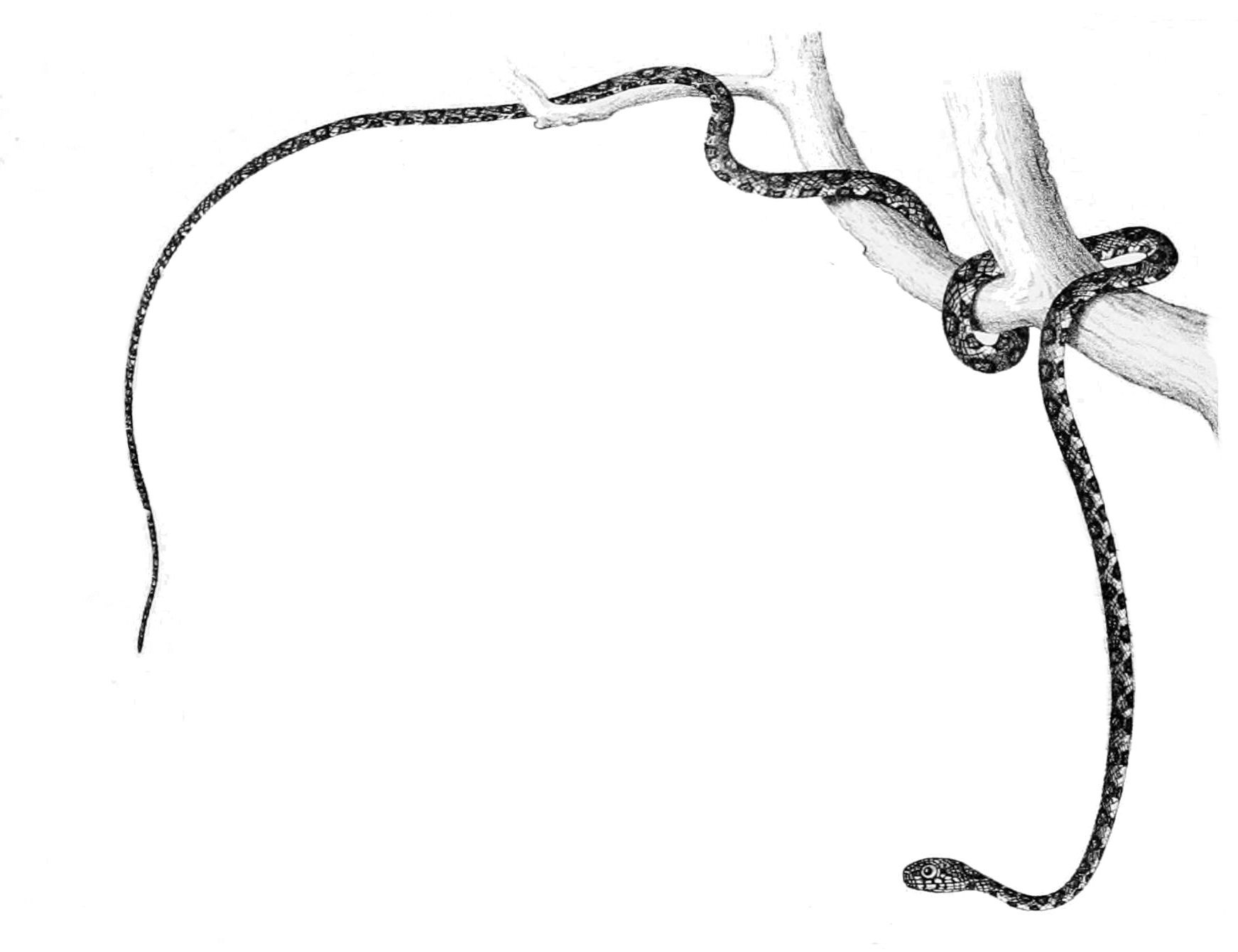

Conservation status
- Least Concern (IUCN 3.1)

Scientific classification
- Kingdom: Animalia
- Phylum: Chordata
- Class: Reptilia
- Order: Squamata
- Suborder: Serpentes
- Family: Colubridae
- Genus: Sibon
- Species: S. argus

Binomial name
- Sibon argus (Cope, 1875)

= Sibon argus =

Species of snake

Sibon argus, also known as the Argus snail sucker, is a species of snake in the family, Colubridae. It is found in Costa Rica and Panama.
