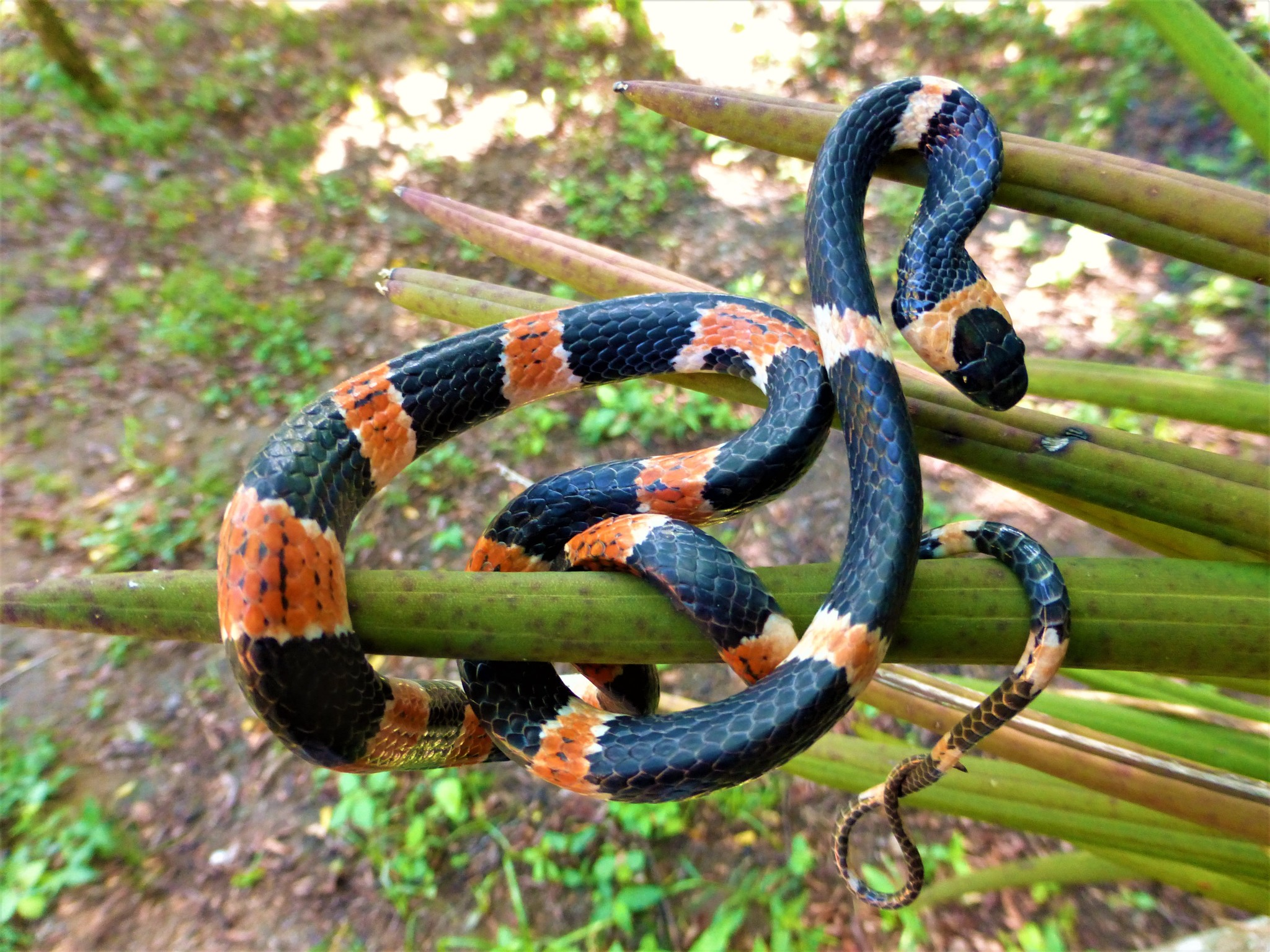

Conservation status
- Least Concern (IUCN 3.1)

Scientific classification
- Kingdom: Animalia
- Phylum: Chordata
- Class: Reptilia
- Order: Squamata
- Suborder: Serpentes
- Family: Colubridae
- Genus: Sibon
- Species: S. anthracops

Binomial name
- Sibon anthracops (Cope, 1868)

= Sibon anthracops =

Species of snake

Sibon anthracops, also known as Cope's snail sucker, is a species of snake in the family, Colubridae. It is found in Costa Rica, Nicaragua, Honduras, Guatemala, and El Salvador.
