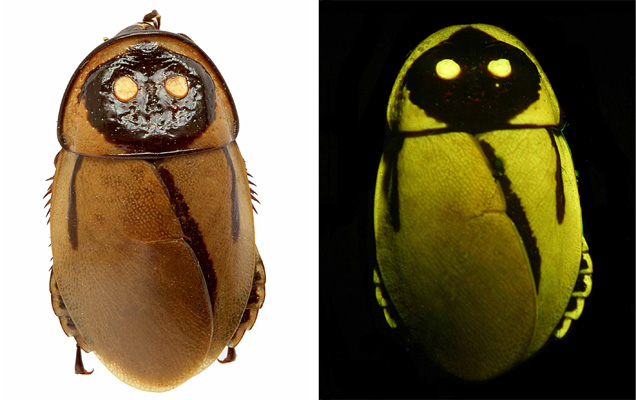

Scientific classification
- Kingdom: Animalia
- Phylum: Arthropoda
- Clade: Pancrustacea
- Class: Insecta
- Order: Blattodea
- Family: Blaberidae
- Genus: Lucihormetica
- Species: L. luckae

Binomial name
- Lucihormetica luckae Vršanský, Fritzsche & Chorvát, 2012

= Lucihormetica luckae =

Giant cockroach species with fluorescent carapace

Lucihormetica luckae is a species of giant cockroach (Blaberidae) from Ecuador.

== Light production ==
Like other species in the genus Lucihormetica, L. luckae's back carapace features one small and two large spots that glow when exposed to light (autofluorescence), perhaps to mimic the appearance of the toxic click beetle (Pyrophorus) that emits light at the same wavelength, in which case this would be an instance of Batesian mimicry. The evidence for genuine bioluminescence in Lucihormetica cockroaches is anecdotal and inconclusive, though there is evidence for autofluorescence as is typical for arthropod cuticles.

== Status ==
The species may be threatened, or even extinct, as only one specimen has ever been collected, some 70 years ago. In addition Tungurahua, the Ecuadorian volcano that served as the species' habitat, entered a new eruptive phase in 1999.

The species was listed among the Top 10 New Species 2012 as selected by the International Institute for Species Exploration at Arizona State University out of more than 140 nominated species.
