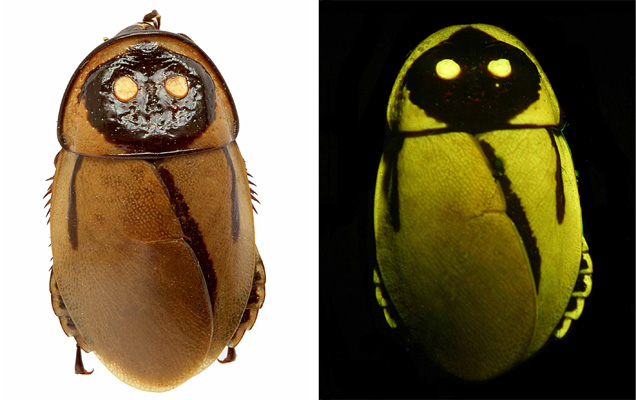
- Lucihormetica luckae

Scientific classification
- Kingdom: Animalia
- Phylum: Arthropoda
- Clade: Pancrustacea
- Class: Insecta
- Order: Blattodea
- Family: Blaberidae
- Subfamily: Blaberinae
- Genus: Lucihormetica; Zompro & Fritzsche, 1999

Species
- See text

= Lucihormetica =

Genus of cockroaches

Lucihormetica is a South American genus of giant cockroaches from the family Blaberidae, collectively referred to as glowspot cockroaches. It had been anecdotally reported that the thoracic spots of males are bioluminescent, but detailed research has conclusively demonstrated otherwise, although autofluorescence has been documented, such that the spots will glow when exposed to ultraviolet light as is typical for artrhopod cuticles. The genus includes both relatively common and rare species: For example, L. verrucosa is sometimes kept in captivity, while eight of the remaining species (as well as an additional undescribed species) only are known from a single specimen each.

== Species ==
The Cockroach Species File lists:

1. Lucihormetica amazonica (Rocha e Silva, 1987)
2. Lucihormetica cerdai (Ramirez-Pérez, 1992)
3. Lucihormetica fenestrata Zompro & Fritzsche, 1999 - type species
4. Lucihormetica grossei Fritzsche, 2003
5. Lucihormetica interna (Walker, 1868)
6. Lucihormetica luckae Vršanský, Fritzsche & Chorvát, 2012
7. Lucihormetica osunai (Ramirez-Pérez, 1992)
8. Lucihormetica seabrai (Rocha e Silva, 1987)
9. Lucihormetica subcincta (Walker, 1868)
10. Lucihormetica tapurucuara (Rocha e Silva, 1979)
11. Lucihormetica verrucosa (Brunner von Wattenwyl, 1865)
12. Lucihormetica yasuniana Vidlicka, 2019
13. Lucihormetica zomproi Fritzsche, 2008
