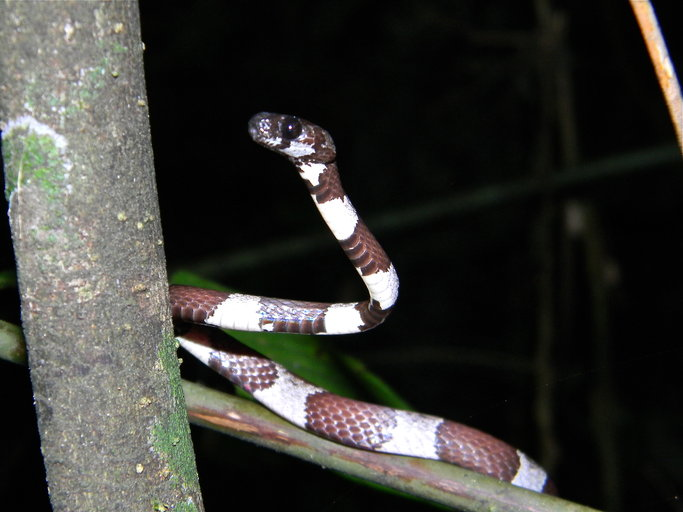

Conservation status
- Least Concern (IUCN 3.1)

Scientific classification
- Kingdom: Animalia
- Phylum: Chordata
- Class: Reptilia
- Order: Squamata
- Suborder: Serpentes
- Family: Colubridae
- Genus: Sibon
- Species: S. dimidiatus

Binomial name
- Sibon dimidiatus (Günther, 1872)

= Sibon dimidiatus =

Species of snake

Sibon dimidiatus, the slender snail sucker, is a species of snake in the family Colubridae. It is found in Central America.
