= Sibon noalamina =

Scientific classification
- Kingdom: Animalia
- Phylum: Chordata
- Class: Reptilia
- Order: Squamata
- Suborder: Serpentes
- Family: Colubridae
- Genus: Sibon
- Species: S. noalamina

Binomial name
- Sibon noalamina Lotzkat et al. 2012

Species of snake

Sibon noalamina is a species of snail-eating snake discovered in 2012 from western Panama. It belongs to the genus Sibon. It has a striking defensive mechanism from predators by mimicking the light and dark stripes of venomous coral snakes.

The species was listed among the Top 10 New Species 2013 discovered in 2012 as selected by the International Institute for Species Exploration at Arizona State University out of more than 140 nominated species. Its distinctiveness is its resemblance to a venomous snake and its presence in an area of anthropogenic exploitation. The selection was publicised on 22 May 2013.

== Nomenclature ==
The specimens, three snakes, were found in the Serranía de Tabasará mountain range where ore mining is extensively degrading and diminishing the natural habitat. Hence the specific name is given as a contraction of the Spanish phrase No a la mina, which in English translates to "No to the mine". This phrase is a campaign slogan to ban mining in the area, where animal habitat is being overexploited.

== Discovery ==
The snake inhabits the mountain range of Serranía de Tabasará in the Comarca Ngöbe-Buglé, an autonomous territory established in 1997 for the indigenous Ngöbe–Buglé people. The mountain is the natural habitat of several amphibians and reptiles, many of which are endemic, thus the mountain is a biodiversity hot spot that remains largely unexplored. Extreme poverty among the human inhabitants has prompted the highest deforestation rate within Panama, where more than one-fifth of the forests were lost in the 1990s. Moreover, the region's enormous ore deposits – especially the copper deposit in the Cerro Colorado area – are heavily subjected to mining. Zoologists of the Senckenberg Research Institute in Frankfurt, Germany made expeditions between 2008 and 2010 to study the rich but exploited biodiversity. They were able to catch three individuals of the new species. The holotype is an adult male collected from headwaters of Río Chiriquí Malí, by Andreas Hertz and Sebastian Lotzkat on 10 August 2010. The paratypes were two juvenile males collected on 29 October 2009, and a juvenile from Cerro Mariposa collected on 28 May 2008.

== Description ==
S. noalamina is quite similar to other colubrid snakes of America such as Dipsas species especially in the pattern of colouration. However, it differs distinctively from other snakes including its related species of Sibon in the specific alignment and shape of the scales. It has only five supralabial scales, the shape of the posterior supralabial are different, and some dorsal rows (3rd to 5th) are keeled in adults. The snake is nocturnal and hunts soft-bodied prey including earthworms and amphibian eggs, in addition to snails and slugs. The contrasting alternating dark rings on light background of the skin are also significantly different from those of other snakes, and consist of 15 dorsal rows throughout the body.

== Significance ==
S. noalamina is quite harmless. However, its elaborate resemblance with a highly venomous coral snake is impressive. As a vulnerable species, it represents an elegant Batesian mimic. It also is a medium for the message of the conservation campaign for biodiversity threats in Panama, as the discoverer Lotzkat remarked, "Sibon noalamina stands with its name against overexploitation of nature and for the conservation of the highland rainforests of western Panama."
