= Telipogon diabolicus =

Conservation status
- Critically Endangered (IUCN 3.1)

Scientific classification
- Kingdom: Plantae
- Clade: Tracheophytes
- Clade: Angiosperms
- Clade: Monocots
- Order: Asparagales
- Family: Orchidaceae
- Subfamily: Epidendroideae
- Genus: Telipogon
- Species: T. diabolicus

Binomial name
- Telipogon diabolicus Kolan., Szlach. & Medina Tr., 2016

Species of orchid

Telipogon diabolicus is a species of orchid in the genus Telipogon. Only a single population of 30 plants are known to exist, on the border between the Putumayo and Nariño departments of southern Colombia. Accordingly, it is classed as "critically endangered" in the International Union for Conservation of Nature's Red List.

The name diabolicus refers to the way its wine-red or maroon gynostemium looks like the head of the devil.

Adult plants are 5.5–9 cm tall.
