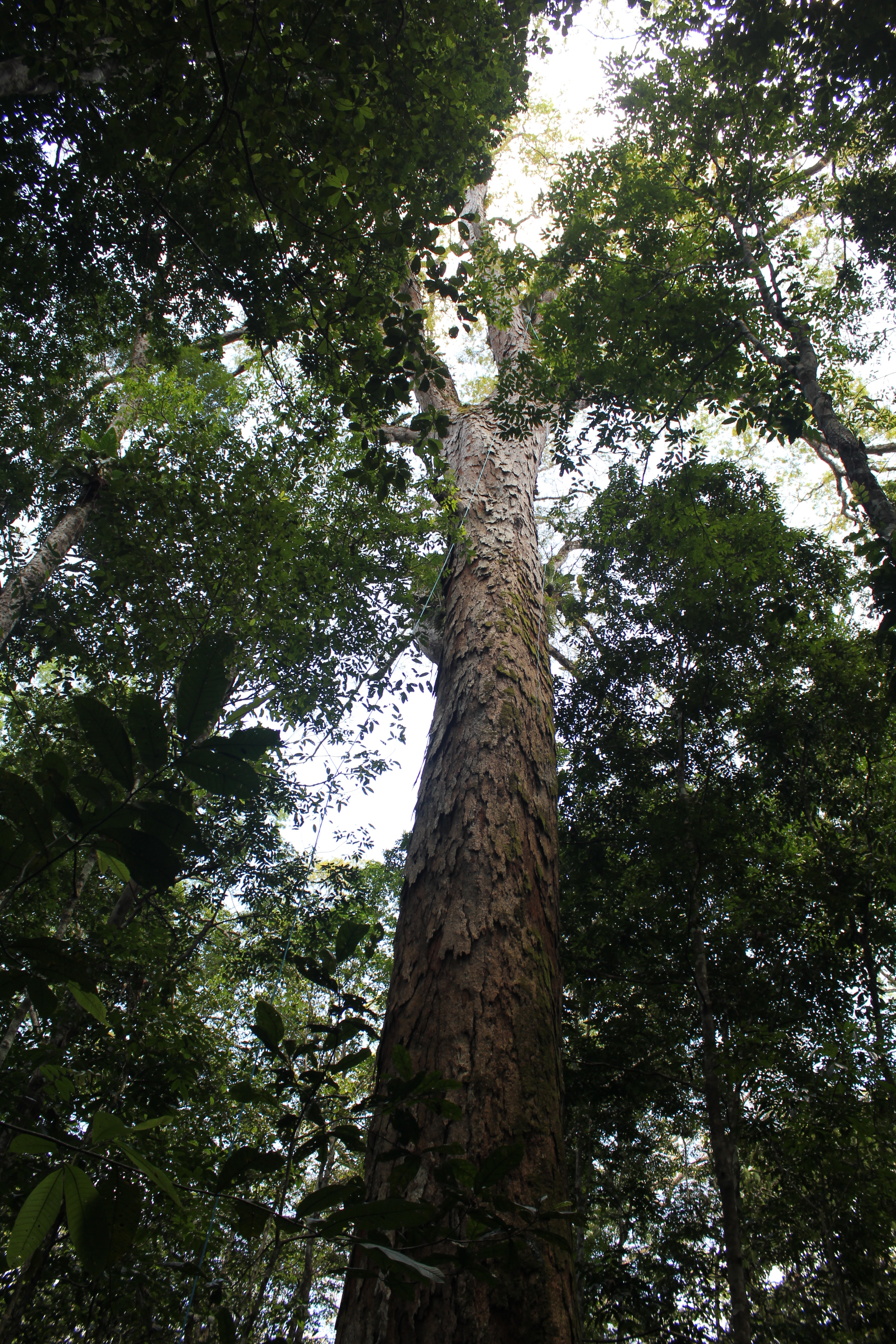
- Dinizia excelsa

Scientific classification
- Kingdom: Plantae
- Clade: Tracheophytes
- Clade: Angiosperms
- Clade: Eudicots
- Clade: Rosids
- Order: Fabales
- Family: Fabaceae
- Subfamily: Caesalpinioideae
- (unranked): Dimorphandra Group A
- Genus: Dinizia; Ducke

Species
- See text.

= Dinizia =

Genus of legumes

Dinizia is a genus of flowering plants in the legume family, Fabaceae. It was believed to be monotypic until 2017, when Dinizia jueirana-facao was described. Dinizia is native to Brazil (North Region and Central-West Region), Guyana and Suriname. Both species are colossal forest trees.

Fossilised leaves and fruit discovered in North America provide evidence of a Dinizia-like ancestor that first occurred in south-eastern North America during the Eocene epoch. The modern genus, however, is confined to South America, where it occurs in non-flooded parts of the Amazonian forests of Guyana, Suriname and seven states of North and Central-West Brazil.

== Species ==
As of December 2019, Plants of the World Online has accepted two species:

- Dinizia excelsa Ducke
- Dinizia jueirana-facao G.P.Lewis & G.S.Siqueira
