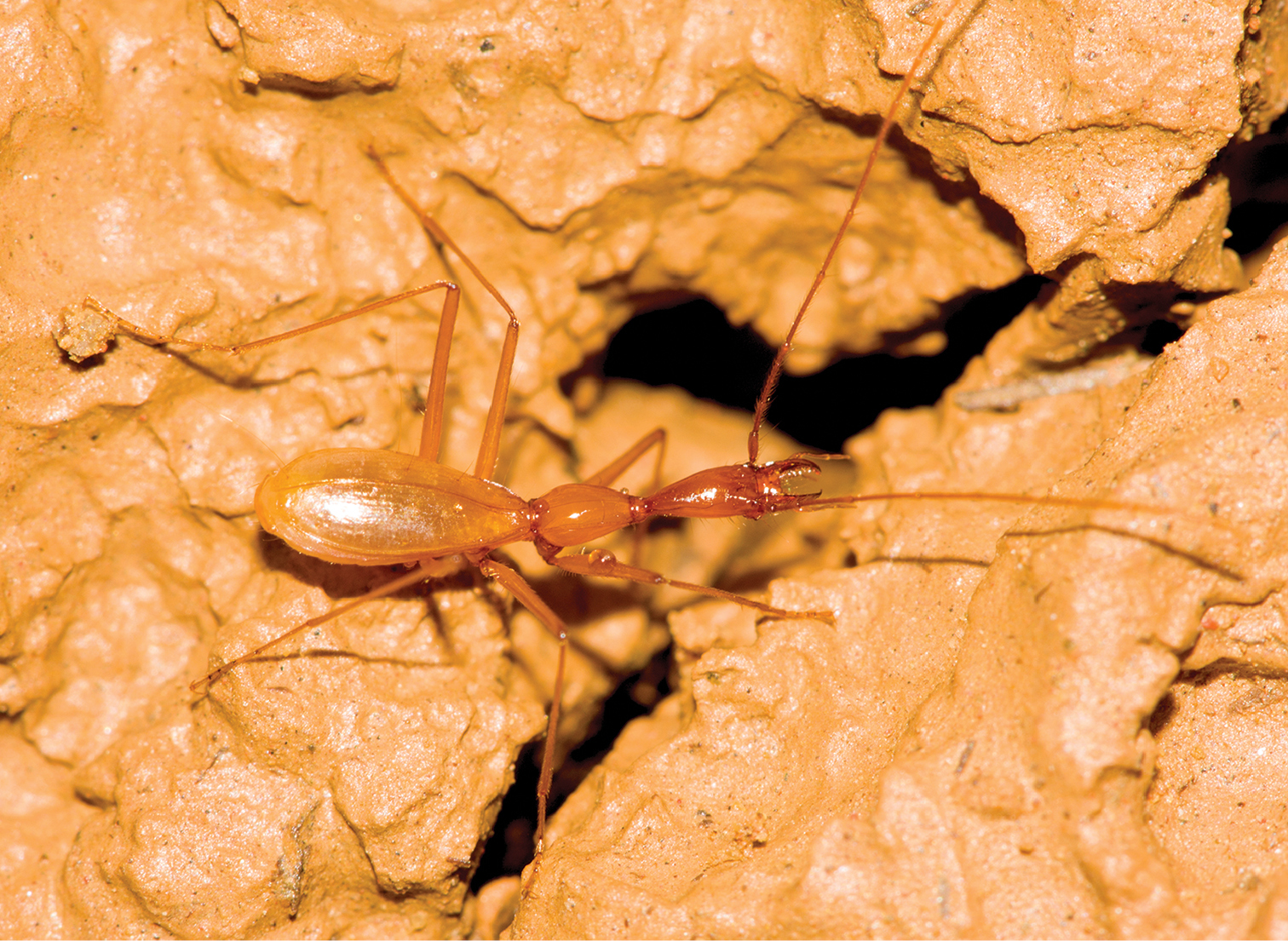
- Dongodytes fowleri

Scientific classification
- Domain: Eukaryota
- Kingdom: Animalia
- Phylum: Arthropoda
- Class: Insecta
- Order: Coleoptera
- Suborder: Adephaga
- Family: Carabidae
- Subfamily: Trechinae
- Tribe: Trechini
- Subtribe: Trechina
- Genus: Dongodytes; Deuve, 1993

Subgenera
- Dongodytes Deuve, 1993; Dongodytodes Tian, 2011

Synonyms
- Dongodytodes Tian, 2011

= Dongodytes =

Genus of beetles

Dongodytes is a genus of beetles in the family Carabidae, first described by Thierry Deuve in 1993.

== Species ==
Dongodytes contains the following thirteen species:

- Dongodytes baxian Tian, 2011
- Dongodytes brevipenis Tian, Yin & Huang, 2014
- Dongodytes deharvengi Tian, 2011
- Dongodytes elongatus Tian, Yin & Huang, 2014
- Dongodytes fowleri Deuve, 1993
- Dongodytes giraffa Deuve, 2005
- Dongodytes grandis Ueno, 1998
- Dongodytes inexpectatus Tian, Yin & Huang, 2014
- Dongodytes jinzhuensis Tian, Yin & Huang, 2014
- Dongodytes lani Tian, Yin & Huang, 2014
- Dongodytes mingruoae Tian, Huang & Jia, 2023
- Dongodytes pingjingae Tian, Huang & Jia, 2023
- Dongodytes tonywhitteni Yang, Huang & Tian, 2018
- Dongodytes troglodytes Tian, Yin & Huang, 2014
- Dongodytes yaophilus Tian, Yin & Huang, 2014
