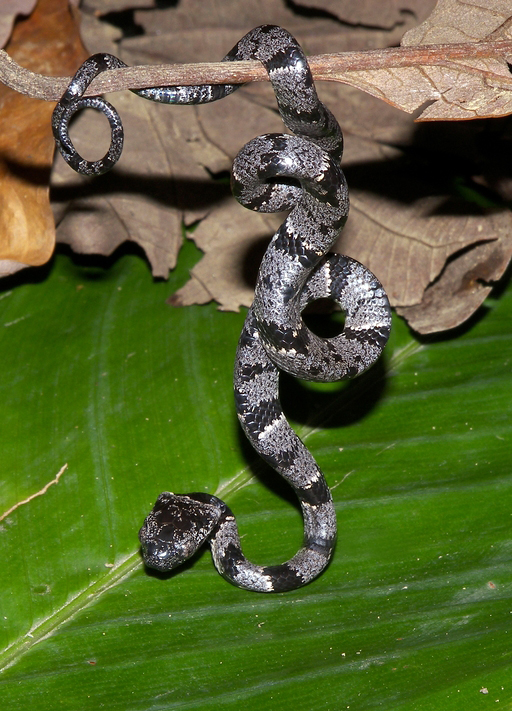
- Sibon nebulatus

Scientific classification
- Kingdom: Animalia
- Phylum: Chordata
- Class: Reptilia
- Order: Squamata
- Suborder: Serpentes
- Family: Colubridae
- Subfamily: Dipsadinae
- Genus: Sibon; Fitzinger, 1826

Type species
- Coluber nebulatus Linnaeus, 1758

Diversity
- 22 species (see text)

= Sibon (snake) =

Genus of snakes

Sibon is a genus of snakes found in northern South America, Central America and Mexico.

== Species ==
There are 22 Sibon species:

- Sibon annulatus (Günther, 1872) - ringed snail sucker
- Sibon anthracops (Cope, 1868) - Cope's snail sucker
- Sibon argus (Cope, 1876) - Argus snail sucker
- Sibon ayerbeorum Vera-Pérez, 2019 - Ayerbes's snail-eater
- Sibon bevridgelyi Arteaga et al., 2018 - Bev Ridgely's snail-eater
- Sibon canopy Arteaga & Batista, 2023
- Sibon carri (Shreve, 1951) - Carr's snail sucker
- Sibon dimidiatus (Günther, 1872) - slender snail sucker
- Sibon dunni J.A. Peters, 1957 - Dunn's snail sucker
- Sibon irmelindicaprioae Arteaga & Batista, 2023
- Sibon lamari Solórzano, 2001
- Sibon leucomelas (Boulenger, 1896) - cloudy snail-eating snake
- Sibon linearis Pérez-Higareda, López-Luna & H.M. Smith, 2002 - lined snail sucker
- Sibon longifrenis (Stejneger, 1909) - Stejneger's snail sucker, lichen-colored snail sucker
- Sibon manzanaresi McCranie, 2007
- Sibon marleyae Arteaga & Batista, 2023
- Sibon merendonensis Rovito, Papenfuss & Vásquez-Almazán, 2012
- Sibon miskitus McCranie, 2006
- Sibon nebulatus (Linnaeus, 1758) - cloudy snail-eating snake
- Sibon noalamina Lotzkat, Hertz & G. Köhler, 2012
- Sibon perissostichon G. Köhler, Lotzkat & Hertz, 2010
- Sibon vieirai Arteaga & Batista, 2023
- Sibon sanniolus (Cope, 1868) - pigmy snail sucker

Nota bene: A binomial authority in parentheses indicates that the species was originally described in a genus other than Sibon.
