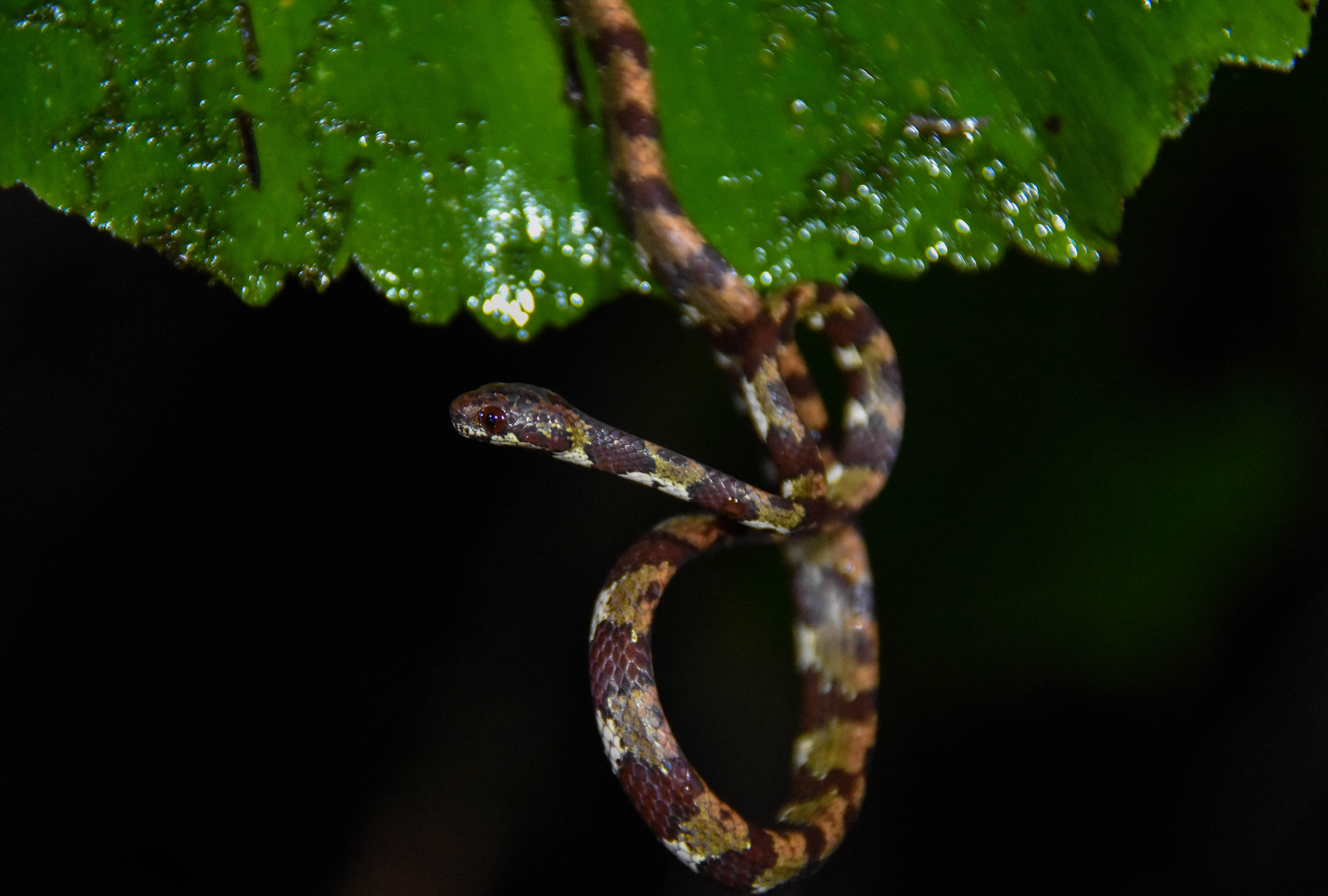

Conservation status
- Least Concern (IUCN 3.1)

Scientific classification
- Kingdom: Animalia
- Phylum: Chordata
- Class: Reptilia
- Order: Squamata
- Suborder: Serpentes
- Family: Colubridae
- Genus: Sibon
- Species: S. annulatus

Binomial name
- Sibon annulatus (Günther, 1872)

= Sibon annulatus =

Species of snake

Sibon annulatus, also known as the ringed snail sucker, is a species of snake in the family, Colubridae. It is found in Costa Rica, Panama, Nicaragua, Honduras, Colombia, and Ecuador.
