= Phytotelmatrichis osopaddington =

Scientific classification
- Kingdom: Animalia
- Phylum: Arthropoda
- Class: Insecta
- Order: Coleoptera
- Suborder: Polyphaga
- Infraorder: Staphyliniformia
- Family: Ptiliidae
- Genus: Phytotelmatrichis
- Species: P. osopaddington

Binomial name
- Phytotelmatrichis osopaddington Darby & Chaboo, 2015

Species of beetle

Phytotelmatrichis osopaddington is a species of beetle in the family Ptiliidae, or the featherwing beetles. It is only known from Peru. It is one of the top 10 new species named in 2015.

== Etymology ==
The specific name osopaddington honours Paddington Bear, born in "darkest Peru". With this, the authors wanted to draw attention to conservation of fragmented habitats of the spectacled bear, and other animals and plants.

== Description ==
It is only 1.03–1.06 mm (0.041–0.042 in) long. It lives in phytotelmata of plants in the order Zingiberales, small pools of water that may form in upright bracts or leaf axils of a plant.
