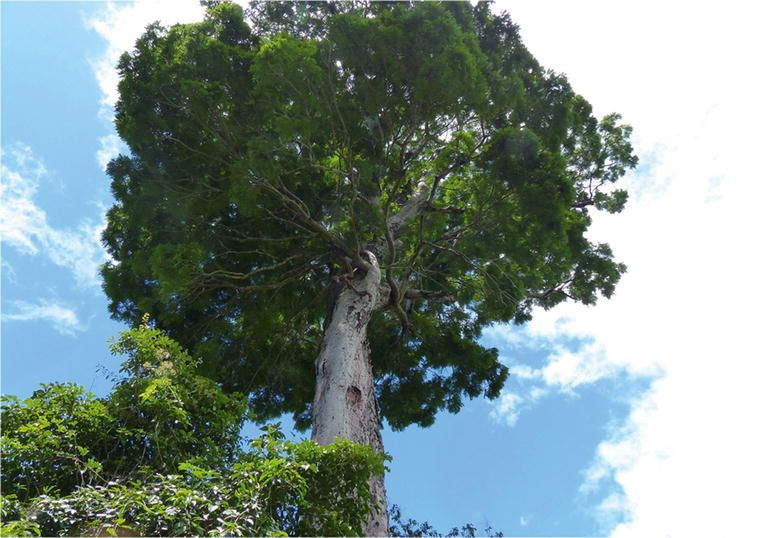

Conservation status
- Critically Endangered (IUCN 3.1)

Scientific classification
- Kingdom: Plantae
- Clade: Tracheophytes
- Clade: Angiosperms
- Clade: Eudicots
- Clade: Rosids
- Order: Fabales
- Family: Fabaceae
- Subfamily: Caesalpinioideae
- Genus: Dinizia
- Species: D. jueirana-facao

Binomial name
- Dinizia jueirana-facao G. P. Lewis & G. S. Siqueira

= Dinizia jueirana-facao =

Species of Brazilian rainforest tree

Dinizia jueirana-facao is a tree in the family Fabaceae which grows in a restricted area of rainforest in Espírito Santo state in Brazil. It was first described by G. P. Lewis & G. S. Siqueira in 2004. Its specific name derives from its local name, "jueirana-facão". There are currently fewer than 25 specimens in existence, making the species critically endangered.

== Physical Features ==
The tree can grow up to 130 feet and weigh over 60 tons.
