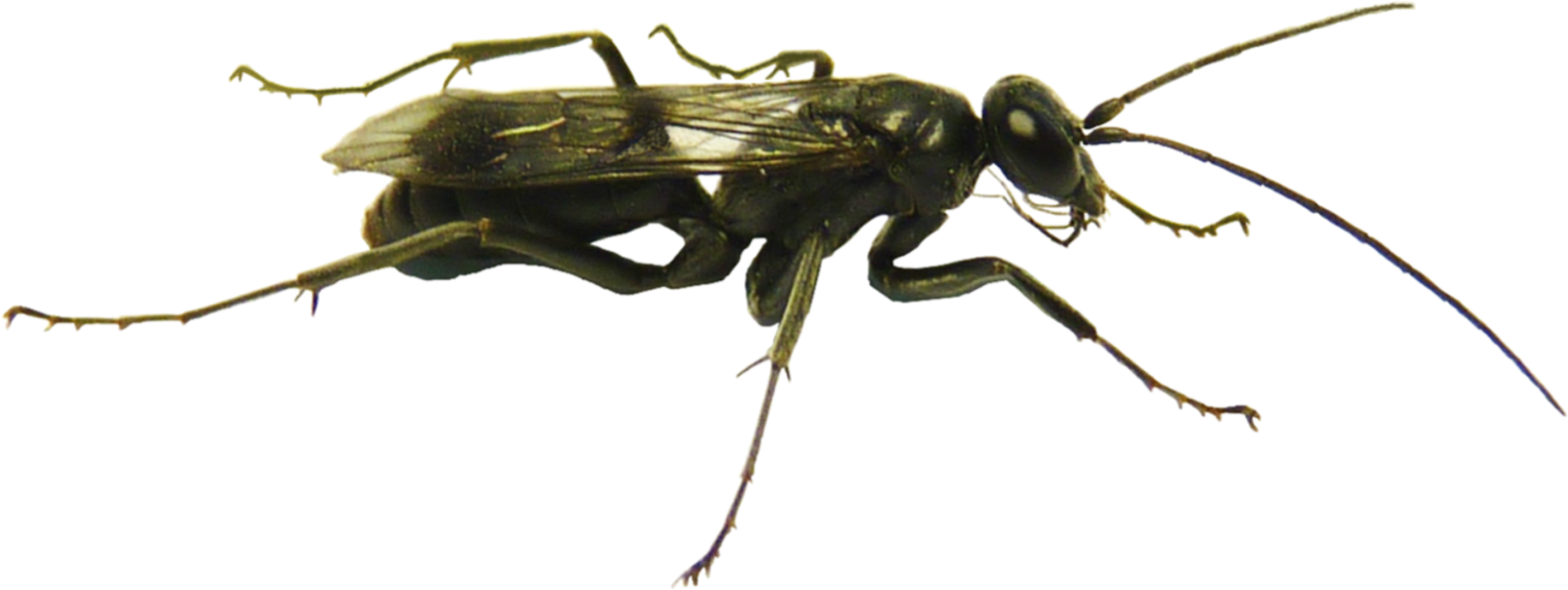

Scientific classification
- Kingdom: Animalia
- Phylum: Arthropoda
- Class: Insecta
- Order: Hymenoptera
- Family: Pompilidae
- Genus: Deuteragenia
- Species: D. ossarium

Binomial name
- Deuteragenia ossarium Ohl, 2014

= Deuteragenia ossarium =

Species of wasp

Deuteragenia ossarium, the bone-house wasp, is a species of pompilid wasp discovered in southeast China in 2014. It was named after graveyard bone-houses or ossuaries, from its characteristic use of a vestibular cell filled with dead ants which is built by the female wasp to close the nest after she lays her eggs.

This technique is theorized to make the species' nests less vulnerable to predatory enemies than nests of other sympatric trap-nesting wasps, possibly by utilizing chemical cues in odors from the dead ants to camouflage the nest from predators, or repel them.

The ant most frequently found in the vestibular cell was Pachycondyla astuta, an aggressive species with a potent sting. D. ossarium parasitism rates were significantly lower than other cavity-nesting wasp species.

Deuteragenia ossarium is a type of wasp that lays its eggs on spiders. The female wasp catches a spider, paralyzes it, and puts it in a hole or tunnel she either finds or digs. Then, she lays one egg on the spider. When the egg hatches, larva slowly eats the spider while staying safe inside the nest. To protect her baby, the mother wasp builds a wall using plants, resin, or dirt before sealing the nest. After that, she leaves, and the baby wasp stays inside, safe, until it grows into an adult and comes out.

In 2015, the International Institute for Species Exploration names it as "Top 10 New Species" for new species discovered in 2014.
