= Akodon spegazzinii =

Conservation status
- Least Concern (IUCN 3.1)

Scientific classification
- Kingdom: Animalia
- Phylum: Chordata
- Class: Mammalia
- Order: Rodentia
- Family: Cricetidae
- Subfamily: Sigmodontinae
- Genus: Akodon
- Species: A. spegazzinii

Binomial name
- Akodon spegazzinii Thomas, 1897
- Collection localities of Akodon spegazzinii

Synonyms
- Akodon alterus Thomas, 1919; Akodon leucolimnaeus Cabrera, 1926; Akodon oenos Braun, Mares, and Ojeda, 2000; Akodon tucumanensis J.A. Allen, 1901

Species of rodent found in Argentina

Akodon spegazzinii, also known as Spegazzini's akodont or Spegazzini's grass mouse, is a rodent in the genus Akodon found in northwestern Argentina. It occurs in grassland and forest at 400 to 3,500 m (1,300 to 11,500 ft) above sea level. After the species was first named in 1897, several other names were given to various populations now included in A. spegazzinii. They are now all recognized as part of a single, widespread and variable species. Akodon spegazzinii is related to Akodon boliviensis and other members of the A. boliviensis species group. It reproduces year-round. Because it is widely distributed and common, Akodon spegazzinii is listed as "least concern" on the IUCN Red List.

Akodon spegazzinii is medium in size for the A. boliviensis species group. The coloration of its upperparts varies considerably, from light to dark and from yellowish to reddish brown. The underparts are yellow-brown to gray. The eyes are surrounded by a ring of yellow fur. The skull contains an hourglass-shaped interorbital region (between the eyes) and various features of the skull distinguish the species from its close allies. Head and body length is 93 to 196 mm (3.7 to 7.7 in) and body mass is 13.0 to 38.0 g (0.46 to 1.34 oz). Its karyotype has 2n = 40 and FN = 40.

== Taxonomy ==
Akodon spegazzinii was first described in 1897 from Salta Province by Oldfield Thomas on the basis of a collection made in late 1896 or early 1897 by mycologist Carlos Luigi Spegazzini, after whom the species was named. Four years later, Joel Asaph Allen named Akodon tucumanensis from Tucumán Province, comparing it to various species now synonymized under Abrothrix olivaceus. Thomas named an additional species, Akodon alterus, from La Rioja Province in 1919, and considered it closely related to A. spegazzinii. A fourth species, Akodon leucolimnaeus, was described by Ángel Cabrera from Catamarca Province in 1926, but after 1932 it was associated with Akodon lactens (now Necromys lactens) as a subspecies.

In 1961, Cabrera listed both spegazzinii and tucumanensis as subspecies of Akodon boliviensis, with alterus as a full synonym of A. boliviensis tucumanensis. In 1990, Philip Myers and colleagues reviewed the Akodon boliviensis species group. They provisionally kept Akodon spegazzinii as a species separate from A. boliviensis, with tucumanensis as a subspecies, and suggested that alterus was likely related to spegazzinii and tucumanensis. Subsequently, the treatment of these species in systematic works became variable. A 1992 paper suggested that alterus and tucumanensis were, at best, very similar to each other, but in 1997, Michael Mares and colleagues listed each of the three as distinct species in a compendium of the mammals of Catamarca, citing differences in habitat and fur coloration. They were followed by Mónica Díaz and Rubén Bárquez in 2007, among others. In 2000 Díaz and colleagues listed alterus and tucumanensis as subspecies of spegazzinii in a review of the mammals of Salta. Guy Musser and Michael Carleton, in the 2005 third edition of Mammal Species of the World, also considered the three to represent the same species, as did Ulyses Pardiñas and colleagues in a 2006 review of Argentinean Akodontini. Meanwhile, Carlos Galliari and Pardiñas had recognized Akodon leucolimnaeus as a true Akodon, not a Necromys, in 1995. Although associated with the Akodon boliviensis group, its precise status remained unclear. The common name "Catamarca akodont" was proposed for this species.

In 1980, Julio Contreras and María Rosi identified an Akodon from the province of Mendoza as Akodon varius neocenus (now Akodon neocenus), but the following year, they identified it as a new species, named Akodon minoprioi in a presentation at a scientific meeting. This name was never formally validated. In 2000, Janet Braun and colleagues formally named this species Akodon oenos and allied it to the Akodon varius species group. The specific name, oenos, is Greek for "wine" and refers to the animal's occurrence in the wine-producing region of Mendoza. The common names "Monte akodont" and "wine grass mouse" were proposed for this species.

In 2010, Pablo Jayat and colleagues reviewed the members of the Akodon boliviensis species group, including A. spegazzinii, in Argentina. They could not find clear differentiation in either morphological or molecular characters between animals belonging to A. alterus, A. leucolimnaeus, A. spegazzinii, and A. tucumanensis, and consequently concluded that they all represent a single species. Although genetic variation is relatively high within A. spegazzinii, there is no clear geographic structure among haplotypes from different regions. The next year, Ulyses Pardiñas and colleagues concluded that A. oenos, which had formerly, and incorrectly, been placed in the A. varius species group, was in fact another synonym of A. spegazzinii. The proliferation of scientific names for this one species occurred because of the terseness of the original description of A. spegazzinii, and a lack of large samples and of appreciation of the substantial variation occurring within A. spegazzinii.

- Akodon boliviensis group
  - - Akodon sylvanus
    - - Akodon polopi
      - - Akodon boliviensis
        - Akodon spegazzinii
  - - Akodon caenosus
    - Akodon lutescens
    - Akodon subfuscus

Relationships within the Akodon boliviensis species group according to analysis of data from the cytochrome b gene

According to phylogenetic analysis of sequences from the mitochondrial cytochrome b gene, Akodon spegazzinii is most closely related to A. boliviensis and more distantly to other members of the A. boliviensis species group, including Akodon polopi and Akodon sylvanus. The boliviensis group is part of the highly diverse genus Akodon and thereby of the tribe Akodontini, which includes about 90 species of South American rodents. Akodontini is one of several tribes within the subfamily Sigmodontinae and the family Cricetidae, which includes hundreds of mainly small rodents distributed chiefly in Eurasia and the Americas.

== Description ==
External image
- Photograph of an example of Akodon spegazzinii

The species is intermediate in size for the Akodon boliviensis species group; it is smaller than A. polopi and A. sylvanus, but larger than A. boliviensis and A. caenosus. The more distantly related A. budini and A. simulator, which occur in the same area, are larger. Akodon spegazzinii is variable in coloration, ranging from light to dark and from reddish to yellowish brown. In general, animals in wetter, lower-lying areas are darker, and those in open, dry environments are paler. There is also variation within populations, and sometimes young mice are darker and lactating females are more reddish. The formerly recognized species Akodon tucumanensis corresponds to the dark, low-altitude populations, while A. leucolimnaeus and A. alterus represent more reddish, high-altitude animals.

The coloration of the upperparts is generally uniform, with some scattered darker hairs. There is a yellow ring around the eyes, which is more prominent than in A. sylvanus. The underparts are not strongly demarcated from the upperparts in color and are yellow-brown to gray. There are some scattered white hairs on the chin. Although this white spot is better developed than in A. sylvanus, A. spegazzinii lacks the conspicuous white spot seen in A. simulator. The color of the feet ranges from white and yellow-brown to gray. Ungual tufts of hairs cover the claws; these hairs are grayish-brown at the bases and whitish at the tips. The amount of hair on the tail is variable, but it is dark brown above and white to yellow-brown below. High-altitude animals tend to have hairier ears and tails.

In the skull, the front part (rostrum) is large, but not as long as in A. budini. The skull is more robust than in the very similar Akodon boliviensis, but less so than in A. simulator. The hourglass-shaped interorbital region (between the eyes) is narrower than in A. caenosus and not as squared as in A. polopi. Members of the Akodon varius group, with which Akodon oenos was formerly associated, tend to have much broader interorbital regions. The braincase is somewhat inflated and bears well-developed temporal and lambdoid crests relative to the situation in A. caenosus; Akodon polopi has even better developed crests.

Although the zygomatic plates (plates of bone at the side of the skull) are variable, their size is generally intermediate for the Akodon boliviensis group and their front margin ranges from straight to a little concave. The zygomatic notches, projections at the front of the plates, are better developed than in A. caenosus and A. sylvanus. The incisive foramina (openings in the front part of the palate) are long, sometimes extending between the first upper molars. Tiny posterolateral palatal pits are located at the back of the palate. The back margin of the palate is squared to rounded, with a spine in the middle (medial process) sometimes present. The opening behind the palate, the mesopterygoid fossa, is of intermediate width, being narrower than in A. sylvanus, A. simulator, and A. budini but broader than in A. caenosus.

The masseteric crests (crests on the outer sides of the mandibles) reach their front ends below the front border of the first molars. Usually, the capsular process (a projection at the back of the mandible housing the root of the lower incisor) is well-developed. The enamel of the upper incisors is yellowish-orange and the incisors are orthodont (with their cutting edge perpendicular to the plane of the toothrow) or slightly opisthodont (with the cutting edge inclined backwards). In contrast, Akodon simulator has more proodont incisors (with the cutting edge oriented forwards) and Akodon neocenus has more opisthodont incisors. The molars are more hypsodont (high-crowned) than in A. caenosus, but are unlike the very hypsodont molars of A. budini. The molar rows are relatively longer than in A. polopi. There are 13 or 14 thoracic (chest), 7 or 8 lumbar (abdomen), and 23 or 26 caudal (tail) vertebrae.

The karyotype includes 40 chromosomes, with a fundamental number of 40 major chromosomal arms and resembles that of other members of the A. boliviensis group. Head and body length is 93 to 196 mm (3.7 to 7.7 in), averaging 158 mm (6.2 in); tail length is 46 to 83 mm (1.8 to 3.3 in), averaging 66 mm (2.6 in); hindfoot length is 18 to 25 mm (0.71 to 0.98 in), averaging 23 mm (0.91 in); ear length is 12 to 21 mm (0.47 to 0.83 in), averaging 14 mm (0.55 in); and body mass is 13.0 to 38.0 g (0.46 to 1.34 oz), averaging 21.6 g (0.76 oz). Like other members of the Akodon boliviensis group, individuals of Akodon spegazzinii continue to grow in adulthood.

== Distribution and ecology ==
Akodon spegazzinii is found in northwestern Argentina, in the provinces of Salta, Catamarca, Tucumán, La Rioja, and Mendoza, at altitudes of 400 to 3,500 m (1,300 to 11,500 ft). Although its main distribution is in the northern provinces of Salta, Tucumán, and Catamarca, there are also scattered records from the more southern provinces of La Rioja and Mendoza, where it is likely restricted to patches of wet habitat. Akodon alterus has been reported from Jujuy, but this record was likely based on misidentified specimens of A. boliviensis, and records of Akodon spegazzinii from Jujuy were based on misidentified A. sylvanus. Akodon spegazzinii is known from a paleontological site in Tucumán Province dated to the latest Pleistocene (Lujanian); it is among the most common species there. The species occurs in the Yungas forest as well as the drier Monte Desert and Puna, where it is found only along streams. In the cloud grasslands of the higher portions of the Yungas, it is the dominant species of sigmodontine rodent.

Although reproduction occurs around the year, there is a peak during the summer (November to April). Molting mostly occurs during autumn and winter (April to August). At one locality in Mendoza, Akodon spegazzinii occurs at an estimated density of 21 individuals per hectare (8.5 per acre) and has a home range size of about 300 m^{2} (3200 sq ft). A number of sigmodontines have been recorded as occurring with A. spegazzinii, including A. caenosus, A. simulator, Neotomys ebriosus, Abrothrix illuteus, Reithrodon auritus, Andinomys edax, and various species of Eligmodontia, Necromys, Calomys, Oligoryzomys, Oxymycterus, and Phyllotis. The tick Ixodes sigelos has been recorded on A. spegazzinii in Tucumán. In addition, the mites Androlaelaps fahrenholzi, Androlaelaps rotundus, and Eulaelaps stabularis and the flea Cleopsylla townsendii are known from the species.

== Conservation status ==
Akodon spegazzinii is listed as "least concern" on the IUCN Red List in view of its wide distribution and apparently stable population; in addition, it occurs in several protected areas. Both Akodon oenos and Akodon leucolimnaeus are listed as "data deficient" with a trend of declining populations; they are said to be threatened by agricultural development.
