= Akodon caenosus =

Conservation status
- Data Deficient (IUCN 3.1)

Scientific classification
- Kingdom: Animalia
- Phylum: Chordata
- Class: Mammalia
- Order: Rodentia
- Family: Cricetidae
- Subfamily: Sigmodontinae
- Genus: Akodon
- Species: A. caenosus

Binomial name
- Akodon caenosus Thomas, 1918
- Distribution in Argentina and Bolivia.

Synonyms
- Akodon puer cænosus Thomas, 1918 (Note: Article 32.5.2 of the International Code of Zoological Nomenclature mandates that specific names first published with a ligature such as æ are to be corrected.); Akodon caenosus: Thomas, 1920; Akodon diminutus Barquez, Díaz, and Goytia, 1994 (Note: Nomen nudum (naked name, not fulfilling the requirements of the International Code of Zoological Nomenclature).); Akodon lutescens caenosus: Anderson, 1997; Akodon aliquantulus Díaz, Barquez, Braun, and Mares, 1999

Species of rodent

Akodon caenosus is a rodent in the genus Akodon found in northwestern Argentina and south-central Bolivia. Since its description in 1918, it has been alternatively classified as a separate species or a subspecies of Akodon lutescens (formerly Akodon puer). The species Akodon aliquantulus, described from some very small Argentine specimens in 1999, is now recognized as a synonym of A. caenosus.

Akodon caenosus is very small, averaging 19.3 g (0.68 oz) in weight, and variable in coloration, but generally brown. The underparts are sharply different in color from the upperparts. The skull has a short rostrum (front part), broad interorbital region (between the eyes), and narrow braincase. The karyotype includes 34 chromosomes. A. caenosus mostly occurs in Yungas vegetation and breeds mainly during the winter. It shares its range with many other sigmodontine rodents, including three other species of Akodon.

== Taxonomy ==
E. Budin collected the first specimen of the species on August 21, 1917, in Jujuy Province, northwestern Argentina, and the next year Oldfield Thomas used the animal as the holotype of a new subspecies of Akodon puer, a Bolivian species. He described the new subspecies Akodon puer cænosus as darker and duller in color than the Bolivian form, but otherwise identical. In 1920, Thomas recognized additional differences between the two after examining more specimens and classified the Argentine form as a separate species, Akodon cænosus. Most subsequent authors followed this arrangement, but since the 1980s some have placed the form (now spelled caenosus) in A. puer again. In 1990, Philip Myers and others reviewed the Akodon boliviensis group, which includes A. puer and A. caenosus, and again considered caenosus as a subspecies of puer. They retained caenosus as a separate subspecific name for the Argentine populations of puer because of its small size, dark fur, and distinctive karyotype. Myers and colleagues had included the name lutescens J.A. Allen, 1901, as a subspecies of Akodon puer Thomas, 1902, and in 1997 Sydney Anderson noted that the older name lutescens should instead be used for the species because of the Principle of Priority; therefore, he utilized the combination Akodon lutescens caenosus for the Argentine subspecies. Through the 1990s and 2000s, authors continued to differ on the classification of caenosus as either a full species or a subspecies or puer (=lutescens).

Two small Akodon collected in 1993 in Tucumán Province, northwestern Argentina, were given the name Akodon diminutus in 1994, but that name is a nomen nudum and therefore not available for use under the International Code of Zoological Nomenclature. In 1999, Mónica Díaz and others described these animals more fully as a new species, Akodon aliquantulus, which they considered closely related to A. puer caenosus. The specific name means "how little" or "how few" in Latin and refers to the small size of the species and the small sample Díaz and colleagues could use. In the 2005 third edition of Mammal Species of the World, Guy Musser and Michael Carleton termed the differentiation between A. aliquantulus and A. lutescens (=puer) "unimpressive" and recommended further taxonomic research. Common names proposed for A. aliquantulus include "Diminutive Akodont" and "Tucumán Grass Mouse".

- Akodon boliviensis group
  - - Akodon sylvanus
    - - Akodon polopi
      - - Akodon boliviensis
        - Akodon spegazzinii
  - - Akodon caenosus
    - Akodon lutescens
    - Akodon subfuscus

Relationships within the Akodon boliviensis species group according to analysis of cytochrome b data.

In 2010, Pablo Jayat and colleagues reviewed the members of the Akodon boliviensis group in Argentina. On the basis of sequences from the mitochondrial cytochrome b gene, they found A. caenosus to be closest to A. lutescens and A. subfuscus, forming a clade that was the sister group to a clade of the remaining species in the A. boliviensis group—A. boliviensis, A. spegazzinii, A. sylvanus, and A. polopi. They classified A. caenosus as a species separate from A. lutescens because the two forms did not form a single clade (A. caenosus was instead closer to A. subfuscus), and because the difference between the cytochrome b sequences of A. lutescens and A. caenosus was relatively high at 3.5%. A. aliquantulus was reduced to a synonym of A. caenosus, because they found no substantial morphometrical differentiation between the two and could not replicate the characters Díaz and colleagues had noted as diagnostic for A. aliquantulus.

== Description ==
Akodon caenosus is the smallest of the Argentine members of the A. boliviensis group–indeed, among the smallest of all species of Akodon. The upperparts are uniformly colored, but their tone is variable: generally ochraceous brown, but approaching yellow, red, or olivaceous in some individuals. Reddish tones occur mostly in lactating females. High-altitude animals are generally lighter, but there is also conspicuous variation within populations. The ears are similar to the upperparts, but some individuals have the sides more rich and clear in color. The underparts are clearly different in color, varying from light gray to yellowish or reddish. There are yellowish rings around the eyes, which are more highly developed in high-altitude populations. There are white to yellowish hairs on the fore- and hindfeet. The tail is variably covered with hair and is dark brown above and white to buffy below.

In the skull, the rostrum (front part) is short, the interorbital region (between the eyes) is broad and hourglass-shaped, and the braincase is small. The zygomatic plate, the flattened front part of the zygomatic arch, is narrow, with poorly developed zygomatic notches at their front, but there is considerable variation in the features of the plate. The incisive foramina (openings in the front part of the palate) extend back to between the first molars. The mesopterygoid fossa, the openings behind the bony palate, is very narrow. In the mandible (lower jaw), the masseteric ridges, which anchor some of the chewing muscles, extend to near the front margin of the first molar. The capsular process, raising in the back part of the mandibular bone that accommodates the root of the incisor, is poorly developed. The upper incisors are orthodont (with the chewing edge in the horizontal plane) to slightly opisthodont (with the chewing edge inclined backward). The molars show some accessory crests and other features, such as the anteroloph on the first upper molar and the mesoloph on the first and second upper molar.

In twelve adult Argentine A. caenosus, total length is 124 to 169 mm (4.9 to 6.7 in), averaging 151 mm (5.9 in); tail length is 46 to 75 mm (1.8 to 3.0 in), averaging 62 mm (2.4 in); hindfoot length is 20 to 26 mm (0.79 to 1.02 in), averaging 21 mm (0.83 in); ear length is 12 to 15 mm (0.47 to 0.59 in), averaging 13 mm (0.51 in); and weight is 10.5 to 27.5 g (0.37 to 0.97 oz), averaging 19.3 g (0.68 oz). The karyotype includes 34 chromosomes with a fundamental number of 40 major arms (2n = 34, FN = 40). The autosomes includes three large and one very small pairs of metacentrics, with two long arms, and twelve small to medium-sized acrocentric pairs, which have a long and a very short arm. The X chromosome is medium-sized and subtelocentric, with a long and a short arm, and the Y chromosome is very small and is acrocentric in Jujuy specimens, but metacentric in those from Tucumán. The karyotype is separated from that of A. lutescens by three Robertsonian translocations.

Members of the Akodon boliviensis group, including A. caenosus, are generally similar and difficult to separate, but they differ in relative cranial measurements and some other characters. A. spegazzinii is larger than A. caenosus; A. sylvanus is darker and has less contrast between the upper- and underparts and less well-developed eye-rings; A. polopi has a squared interorbital region and more well-developed ridges on its skull; and A. boliviensis is paler and has more densely furred ears.

== Distribution and ecology ==
Akodon caenosus is found from northwestern Argentina into south-central Bolivia. In Bolivia, it occurs in Tarija and Chuquisaca Departments. Its Argentine distribution extends from far northern Salta to southern Catamarca at altitudes ranging from 400 to 3,100 m (1,300 to 10,200 ft). It is mostly found in Yungas, but also in the highest levels of the Chaco and the lowest of the Andean mountain grasslands. It occurs together with A. boliviensis, A. sylvanus, A. simulator, and species of Oxymycterus, Calomys, Phyllotis, Oligoryzomys, Necromys, Andinomys, Graomys, and Abrothrix. Breeding occurs throughout the year, but mostly from November to January, during the summer. Molting occurs mostly during the winter and autumn. The oestrid fly Cuterebra apicalis and the flea Hectopsylla gracilis have been recorded from A. caenosus. The mites Androlaelaps fahrenholzi, Androlaelaps rotundus, and Eulaelaps stabularis have been found on A. aliquantulus.

== Literature cited ==
- Anderson, S. 1997. Mammals of Bolivia, taxonomy, and distribution. Bulletin of the American Museum of Natural History 231:1–652.
- Díaz, M.M., Barquez, R.M., Braun, J.K. and Mares, M.A. 1999. A new species of Akodon (Muridae: Sigmodontinae) from northwestern Argentina (subscription required). Journal of Mammalogy 80(3):786–798.
- Duff, A. and Lawson, A. 2004. Mammals of the World: A checklist. New Haven: A & C Black, 312 pp. ISBN 0-7136-6021-X
- Dunnum, J.; Vargas, J.; Bernal, N.; Zeballos, H.; Vivar, E.; Patterson, B.; Jayat, J.; D'elia, G. (2016). "Akodon lutescens". IUCN Red List of Threatened Species. 2016 e.T753A22381474. doi:10.2305/IUCN.UK.2016-3.RLTS.T753A22381474.en.
- International Commission on Zoological Nomenclature. 1999. International Code of Zoological Nomenclature. Fourth edition. London: The International Trust for Zoological Nomenclature. ISBN 0-85301-006-4
- Jayat, J.P., Ortiz, P.E., Salazar-Bravo, J., Pardiñas, U.F.J. and D'Elía, G. 2010. The Akodon boliviensis species group (Rodentia: Cricetidae: Sigmodontinae) in Argentina: species limits and distribution, with the description of a new entity (abstract). Zootaxa 2409:1–61.
- Lareschi, M., Autino, A.G., Díaz, M.M., and Barquez, R.M. 2003. New host and locality records for mites and fleas associated with wild rodents from northwestern Argentina. Revista de la Sociedad Entomológica de Argentina 62(3–4):60–64.
- Lareschi, M., Sanchez, J.P., Ezquiaga, M.C., Autino, A.G., Díaz, M.M. and Barquez, R.M. 2010. Fleas associated with mammals from northwestern Argentina, with new distributional reports (subscription required). Comparative Parasitology 77(2):207–213.
- Musser, G.G. and Carleton, M.D. 2005. Superfamily Muroidea. Pp. 894–1531 in Wilson, D.E. and Reeder, D.M. (eds.). Mammal Species of the World: a taxonomic and geographic reference. 3rd ed. Baltimore: The Johns Hopkins University Press, 2 vols., 2142 pp. ISBN 978-0-8018-8221-0
- Myers, P., Patton, J.L. and Smith, M.F. 1990. A review of the boliviensis group of Akodon (Muridae: Sigmodontinae) with emphasis on Perú and Bolivia. Miscellaneous Publications of the Museum of Zoology, University of Michigan 177:1–89.
- Pinto, C.M. and Claps, G.L. 2005. First record of Cuterebra almeidai (Guimaraes and Carrera) from Argentina, new host records for Cuterebra apicalis Guerin-Meneville, and list of Cuterebra (Diptera: Oestridae) in the collection of the Instituto-Fundacion Miguel Lillo, Tucuman, Argentina. Proceedings of the Entomological Society of Washington 107(3):572–575.
- Thomas, O. 1918. On small mammals from Salta and Jujuy collected by Mr. E. Budin. Annals and Magazine of Natural History (9)1:186–193.
- Thomas, O. 1920. A further collection of mammals from Jujuy. Annals and Magazine of Natural History (9)5:188–196.
