= Tunga =

Tunga may refer to:

== Places ==
- Tunga, Leyte, a municipality in the Philippines
- Tunga River, a river in India
- The Gaelic name for the village of Tong, Lewis, in the Western Isles of Scotland
- The Gaelic name for the village of Tongue, Highland, in the northwest of Scotland
- Tunga Spur, a rock formation in Antarctica
- Tunka Suka or Tunga Suca, a mountain in Peru
- Tálknafjörður, a town formerly called Tunga, in Iceland

== People ==
- Alp Er Tunga, a mythical hero in Turkish literature
- Michy Batshuayi Tunga, footballer
- Tunga (artist) (1952–2016), Brazilian sculptor and performance artist

== Other uses ==
- Tunga (flea), a genus of burrowing fleas
- Tunga rakau or tunga haere, Maori names for huhu beetle larvae
- Battle of Tunga, or Battle of Lalsot in India in 1787
