= Hectopsylla =

Scientific classification
- Kingdom: Animalia
- Phylum: Arthropoda
- Clade: Pancrustacea
- Class: Insecta
- Order: Siphonaptera
- Family: Hectopsyllidae
- Genus: Hectopsylla

Species
- See text.

Genus of fleas

Hectopsylla is a genus of fleas in the family Hectopsyllidae that parasitize non-volant mammals, birds, and bats. The genus comprises thirteen species, six of which were described in whole or part by Karl Jordan between 1906–1942. Two of the species in Hectopsylla, H. psittaci and H. pulex, go under common names, with H. psittaci identified as the sticktight flea and H. pulex identified as the chiggerflea. Hastritter and Méndez (2000) consider the genus Rhynchopsyllus a junior synonym of the genus.

== Taxonomy ==
Hastritter and Méndez (2000) state that Rhynchopsyllus is a junior synonym of Hectopsylla. The type species, by monotypy, is H. psittaci.

Pulicoidea

- Pulicoidea
  - Hectopsyllidae
    - Hectopsylla
      - Hectopsylla psittaci
      - Hectopsylla pulex
    - Neotunga
    - Rhynchopsyllus
    - Tunga
  - Pulicidae

Cladogram table showing Hectopsylla in the superfamily Pulicoidea, with select species (note: not a phylogenetic tree)

== Species ==
External images
- Annotated image of a flea, taken from Jerome Goddard, Flea-Borne Diseases
- Species of Hectopsylla, including H. narium, H. knighti, H. psittaci and H. pulex, taken from Blank et al. 2007
- The chiggerflea H. pulex attached to a male lesser long-nosed bat, taken from Hastriter et al. 2014

H. gracilis, H. narium, and H. pascuali were observed in the Chubut, Río Negro, and Neuquén provinces, respectively, in Argentina

There are thirteen species in the genus Hectopsylla.

- Hectopsylla broscus (Jordan & Rothschild, 1906)

H. broscus is described as similar to H. coniger, but the bristles of the head are longer, with the proportion of the second segment of the maxillary palpus to the fourth segment being 7:11 in H. broscus and 8:10 in H. coniger. The angle of its frons were described as strongly rounded. In the thorax, the metasternite and pro-processes are narrower, with the meta-thoracic epimerum having three bristles, but rarely four or two. The tarsi of the legs are longer than in H. coniger, with the fifth segment especially being longer. Separate from a vertical row of bristles near the eighth tergite were three or four additional bristles, with the additional bristles not present in H. coniger. A series of twelve female specimen of H. broscus were found on Humboldt's hog-nosed skunk Conepatus humboldtii in Central Pampa, Argentina, in or prior to 1906.

- Hectopsylla coniger (Jordan & Rothschild, 1906)

The species can be recognized by the fifth tarsal segment over both sexes, the sexual organs of the male, and the metathoracical epimerum of the female, which is curved. On the head, the frons of the female is "strongly angulate", with the male frons rounded strongly. The metathorax's episternum produces into a triangular process in both sexes. In number, the bristles on its legs are fewer than that of H. psittaci, and its hind femur is shorter than H. psittaci. One male specimen and fourteen female specimen were collected from the hog-nosed skunk Conepatus arequipae in Pampa Olliga, Bolivia, in October 1901.

- Hectopsylla cypha (Jordan, 1942)

H. cypha was first described by Karl Jordan in 1942.

- Hectopsylla eskeyi (Jordan, 1933)

H. eskeyi was first described by Jordan in 1933.

- Hectopsylla gemina (Jordan, 1939)

H. gemina was first described by Jordan in 1939.

- Hectopsylla gracilis (Mahnert, 1982)

H. gracilis was first described based on a collection of specimen from Eligmodontia typus as well as collection from unidentified rodents from Puerto Madryn, Chubut Province, Argentina; its name derives from the slender process of its metepimeron. The species can be identified by a short, broadly triangular maxillary, with a short genal lobe and, normally, four bristles on its metepimeron. H. gracilis keys near H. ekeyi, H. suarezi, and H. cypha. It is differentiated from those species by its metepimeron, the shorter process of its lateral metanotal area, and the number of bristles on its abdominal terga. The species has been observed on Akodon caenosus.

- Hectopsylla knighti (Traub & Gammons, 1950)

Its description was based on a sole female specimen taken from an unknown species of swift in Michoacán, Mexico. H. knighti was the first species in Hectopsylla to be described outside of South America.

- Hectopsylla narium (Blank et al., 2007)

The species was found on 204 of 308 nestlings of the burrowing parrot Cyanoliseus patagonus patagonus observed near El Cóndor, Río Negro Province, Patagonia. "Freshly-emerged" H. narium adults can jump up to 25 centimetres (9.8 in) horizontally, and vivaciously crawl. Once anchored on skin of the host, females of the species become sessile. Males of the species were observed in the nostrils of the burrowing parrot, but never feeding on nestlings; males and females mated in nasal cavities. The presence of the species in nasal cavities effectuated breathing difficulties in the parrot. Females stuck on nestlings until their death.

- Hectopsylla pascuali (Beaucournu and Alcover, 1990)

H. pascuali was first described in a 1989 paper that examined 973 fleas from Neuquén Province, Argentina. One male and four females were recorded, with three females taken from the Andean long-clawed mouse Chelemys macronyx in Arroyo Chapelco.

- Hectopsylla psittaci (von Frauenfeld, 1860)

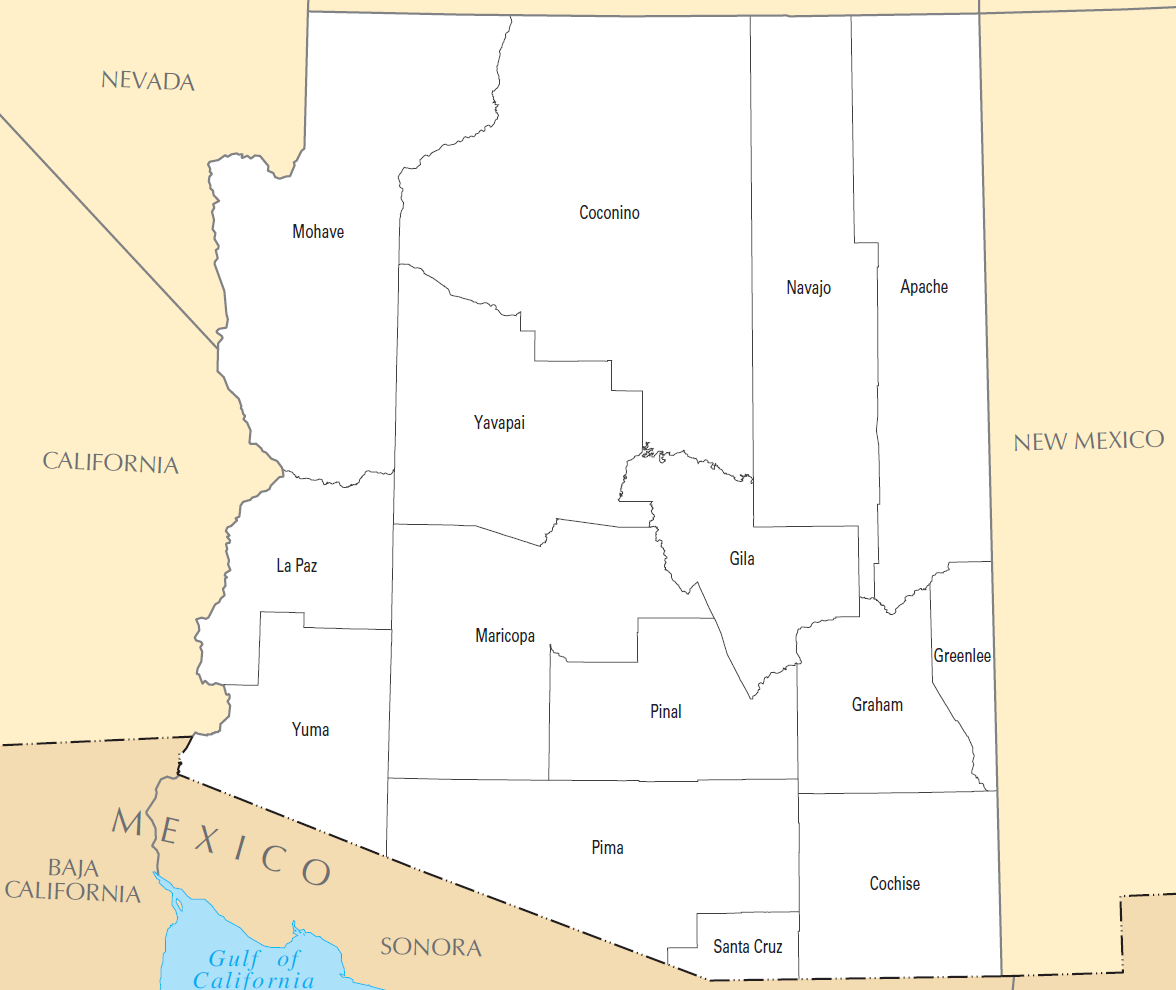
H. pulex has been found in Cochise County, Arizona

H. psittaci is also referred to by the common name "stick-tight flea" or "sticktight flea". The flea has been observed from northern Chile on Markham's storm petrel Hydrobates markhami to Marin County, California on the American cliff swallow Petrochelidon pyrrhonota; based on their age, the American cliff swallows on which the fleas were found had migrated at least once from their winter range in Uruguay, central Argentina, Paraguay, and Brazil, which lead the authors to state their presence might have been a natural introduction of the flea to California. H. psittaci was found on shama and dhyal birds in the London Zoological Gardens, an apparent result of introduction from an American bird, and on various live pigeons that used zoos as a source for food and shelter. Its maxilla is curved slightly forward and short, compared to the long maxilla in H. pulex. The female frons is longer than the male frons. In the thorax, its epimerum is round above, and narrows ventrally; in the abdomen, segments two to seven of the sternites lack bristles. Its claw has a "distinct basal projection."

- Hectopsylla pulex (Haller, 1880)

In the United States, H. pulex has been found on the lesser long-nosed bat Leptonycteris yerbabuenae in Cochise County, Arizona. H. pulex is also referred to by the common name "chiggerflea" or "chigger flea".

- Hectopsylla stomis (Jordan, 1925)

H. stomis was first described by Jordan in 1925.

- Hectopsylla suarezi (C. Fox, 1929)

H. suarezi, also known as H. suarez, was first described by Fox in 1929.
