= Kuvsletta Flat =

Icy area near Queen Maud Land, Antarctica

Kuvsletta Flat (73°50′S 5°14′W) is a small, flattish, ice-covered area between Utrinden Point and Framranten Point, near the southwest end of the Kirwan Escarpment in Queen Maud Land, Antarctica. It was mapped by Norwegian cartographers from surveys and air photos by the Norwegian–British–Swedish Antarctic Expedition (1949–52) and additional air photos (1958–59), and named Kuvsletta (the hump plain).
