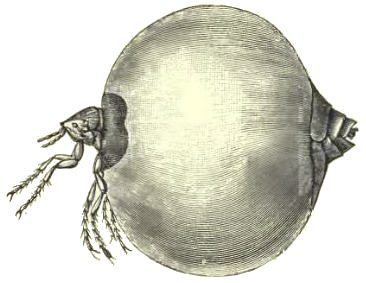

Scientific classification
- Kingdom: Animalia
- Phylum: Arthropoda
- Clade: Pancrustacea
- Class: Insecta
- Order: Siphonaptera
- Family: Hectopsyllidae
- Genus: Tunga
- Species: T. penetrans

Binomial name
- Tunga penetrans (Linnaeus, 1758)

= Tunga penetrans =

Jigger flea

Species of flea

Tunga penetrans is a species of flea also known as the jigger, jigger flea, chigoe, chigo, chigoe flea, chigo flea, nigua, sand flea, or burrowing flea. It is a parasitic insect found in most tropical and sub-tropical climates. In its parasitic stage it can cause significant health issues for its hosts, including humans and certain other mammals. An infestation of T. penetrans is called tungiasis. Jiggers are often confused with chiggers, which are a type of mite and not related. The species is native to Central and South America, and has also been introduced to sub-Saharan Africa.

Synonyms for Tunga penetrans include Sarcopsylla penetrans, Pulex penetrates, and many others.

== Description ==
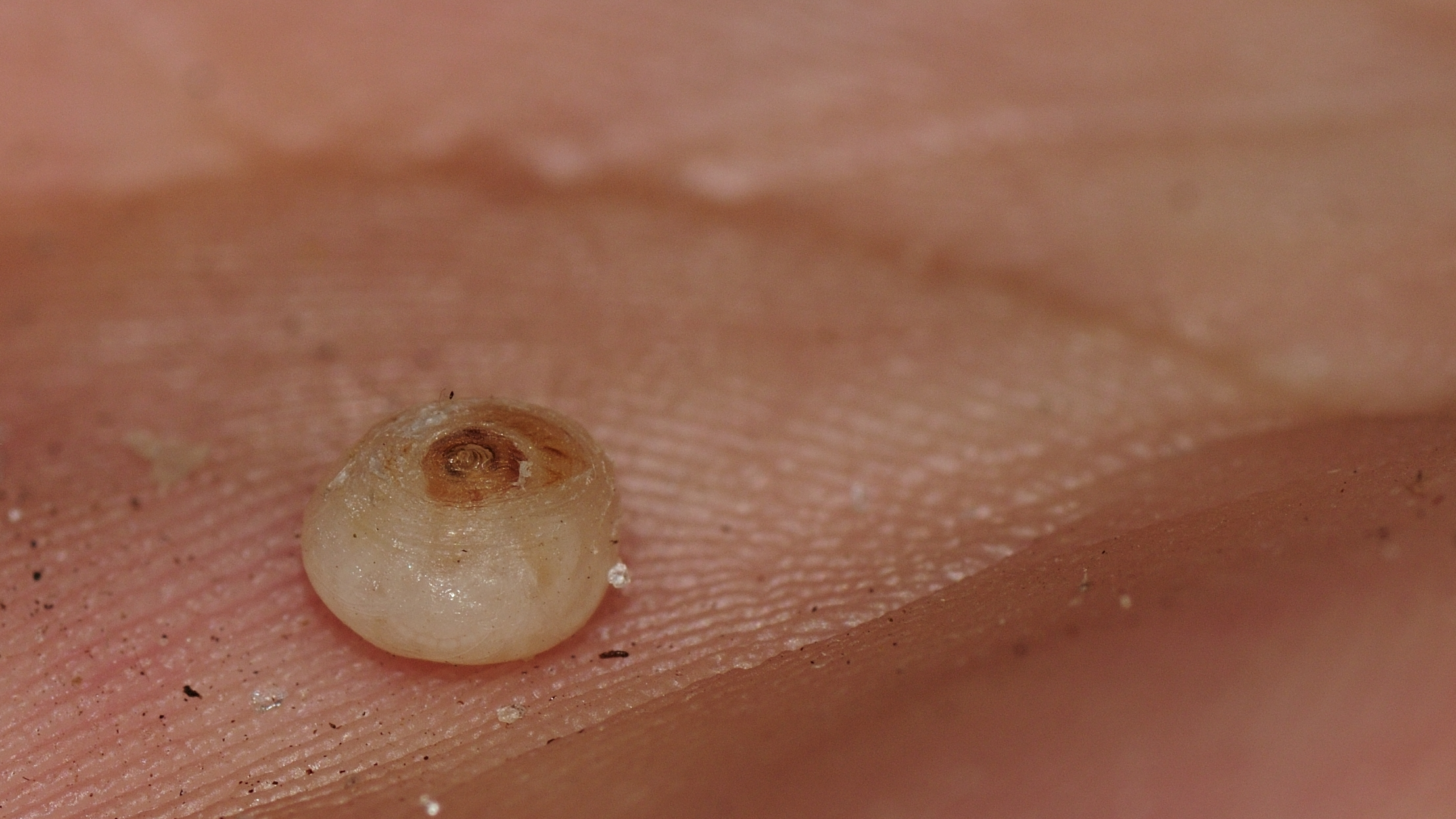
Tunga penetrans

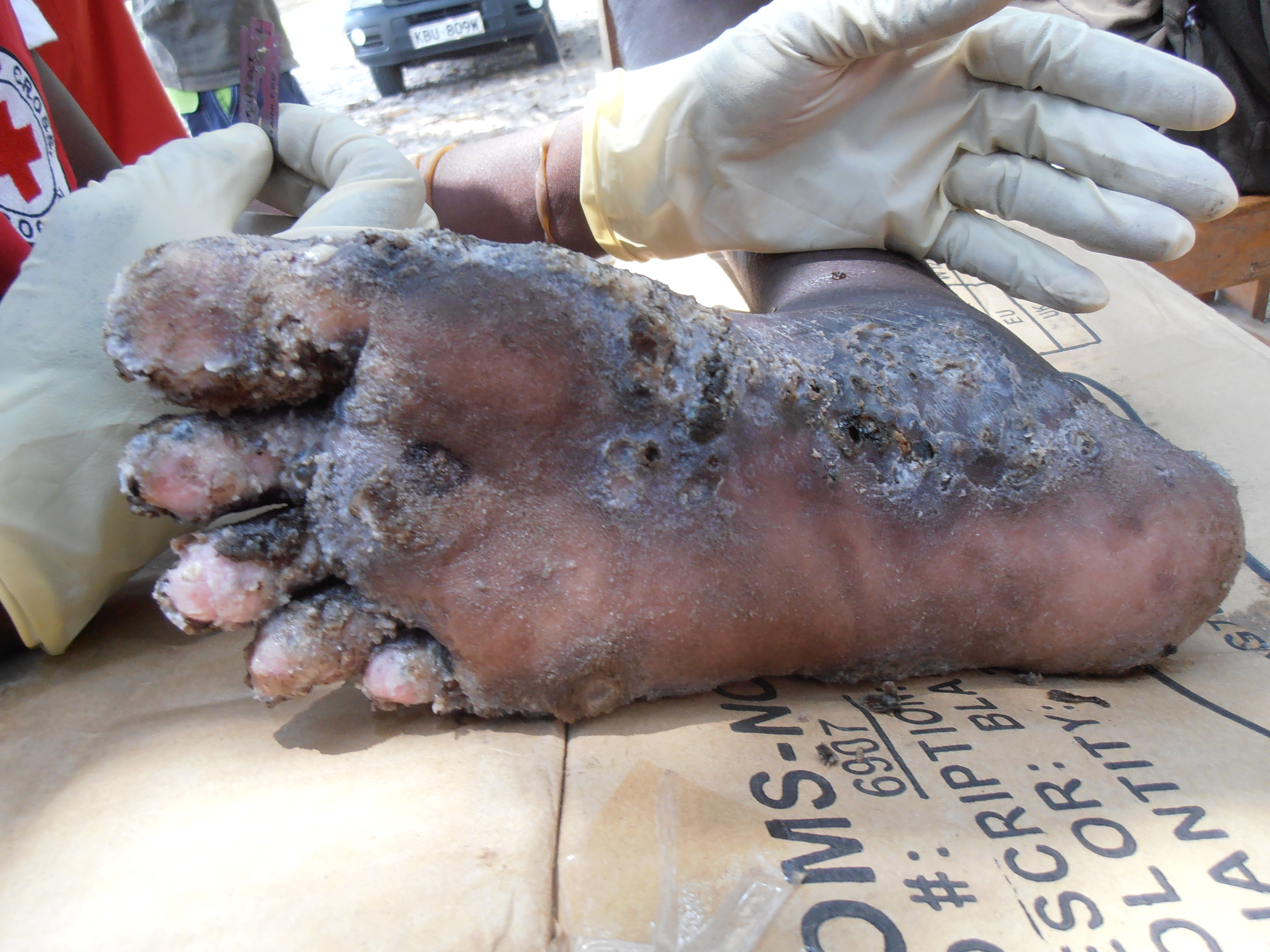
Jigger (sand flea) infested foot

T. penetrans is a small flea around 1 mm (0.039 in) in length. Adults have an angled head and lack pronotal and genal ctenidia. To facilitate reproduction males have a long intromittent organ, one of the largest in relation to body size.

=== Distinction ===
The colloquial name jigger may be confused with chigger, a parasitical mite. However, the jigger is a type of flea (Order Siphonaptera). The chigger is a minute arachnid. Mites penetrate the skin and feed on skin cells that are broken down through an enzyme they secrete from their mouth, but they will then leave the host. The adult and the larval forms both feed on other animals. This is not the case with T. penetrans, as only the adults feed on mammals, and the mature female remains in the host for the rest of her life.

== Distribution ==
T. penetrans is native to South America but is found globally in tropical and sub-tropical areas. T. penetrans has become a parasite of concern in sub-Saharan Africa.

== Hosts ==
Host species for T. penetrans'

- Artiodactyla: Bos taurus (cow), Sus domesticus (pig), Capra hircus (goat), Ovis aries (sheep), Dicotyles tajacu (peccary), Lama glama (llama), Lama vicugna (vicuña), Potamochoerus porcus (red river hog)
- Carnivora: Canis familiaris (dog), Felis catus (cat), Panthera onca (jaguar)
- Cingulata (armadillos): Dasypus novemcinctus (nine-banded armadillo), D. hybridus (southern long-nosed armadillo), Chaetophractus villosus (big hairy armadillo)
- Primate: Homo sapiens (human), Papio sp. (baboon)
- Rodentia: Cuniculus paca (lowland paca), Dasyprocta punctata (Central American agouti), Mus musculus (house mouse), Mus musculoides (Temminck's mouse), Rattus rattus (black rat), Rattus norvegicus (brown rat), Cavia porcellus (guinea pig), Cavia aperea (Brazilian guinea pig), Myoprocta acouchy (red acouchi), Hystrix (porcupine)

== Environment ==
For the most part, the chigoe flea lives 2–5 cm below sand, an observation which helps explain its overall distribution. The temperature is generally too hot for the larvae to develop on the surface of the sand and the deeper sand does not have enough oxygen.

In a study of off-host stages, samples were taken from the top of the soil (to a maximum depth of 1 cm). The presence of T. penetrans in a soil sample was unaffected by soil temperature, air temperature or air humidity. No life stages of T. penetrans were found in any outdoor sample.

There is an observable drop in infestations during the wet season.

== Life cycle ==
T. penetrans has a life cycle similar to other fleas, except for adult females that burrow into the skin of a host and engorges itself on blood and other fluids expanding in size to up to 80 times in a period of 8 to 10 days. The flea leaves an opening which enables respiration, sexual reproduction, and expelling eggs into soil.

T. penetrans eggs, on average, are 0.6 mm long, The larva will hatch from the egg within one to six days, assuming the environmental conditions (e.g., moisture, humidity, etc.) are favorable.

After hatching, the flea will progress through two instar phases. This is unique in that most fleas go through three. Over the course of that development, the flea will first decrease in size from its just-hatched size of 1.5 mm to 1.15 mm (first instar) before growing to 2.9 mm (second instar).

About six to eight days after hatching, the larva pupates and builds a cocoon around itself. Because it lives mostly on and below the surface of sand, sand is used to stabilize the cocoon and help to promote its development. An environmental disturbance such as rain or a lack of sand have been shown to decrease incidence, most likely due to decreasing the environmental factors (i.e., sand) on which the flea depends for overall growth. Barring any disturbances to the cocoon, an adult flea will emerge from the puparium after 9–15 days.

=== In vivo development ===
In a seminal paper on the biology and pathology of Tunga penetrans, Eisele et al. (2003) provided and detailed the five stages of tungiasis, thereby detailing the in vivo development of the female chigoe flea for the first time. In dividing the natural history of the disease, the Fortaleza Classification formally describes the last part of the female flea's life cycle where it burrows into its host's skin, expels eggs, and dies.

Stage 1 is characterized by the penetration of the skin by the female chigoe flea. Running along the body, the female uses its posterior legs to push its body upward by an angle between 45 and 90 degrees. Penetration then starts, beginning with the proboscis going through the epidermis.

By stage 2 (days 1–2), penetration is complete and the flea has burrowed most of its body into the skin. Only the anus, the copulatory organs, and four rear air holes in fleas called stigmata remain on the outside of the epidermis. The anus will excrete feces that is thought to attract male fleas for mating, described in a later section. The hypertrophic zone between tergites 2 and 3 in the abdominal region begins to expand a day or two after penetration and takes the appearance of a life belt. During this time, the flea begins to feed on the host's blood.

Stage 3 is divided into two substages, the first of which being 2–3 days after penetration is complete. In 3a, maximum hypertrophy is achieved and the flea's midsection swells to the size of a pea.

Due to the expanding flea, the outer layer of the skin is stretched thin, resulting in the appearance of a white halo around the black dot (rear end of the flea) at the center of the lesion. The black dot is the flea's exposed hind legs, respiratory spiracles and reproductive organs.

In 3b, the chitin exoskeleton of tergites 2 and 3 increase in thickness and gives the structure the look of a mini caldera. Egg release is common in substage 3b, as are fecal coils. The eggs tend to stick to the skin. At about the 3rd week after penetration, stage 4 begins, which is also divided into two substages. In 4a, the flea loses its signs of vitality and appears near death. As a result, the lesion shrinks in size, turns brown, and appears wrinkled. The death of the flea marks the beginning of substage 4b (around day 25 post-penetration) as the body begins to eliminate the parasite through skin repair mechanisms (e.g. shedding and subsequent skin repair). At this phase, the lesion is seen as brown or black.

If the flea is left within the skin, dangerous complications can occur including secondary infections from trapped bacteria such as Staphylococcus, Streptococcus, enterobacteriaceae, and Clostridium tetani. Lingering effects may include loss of toenails and toe deformation. These seem to be commonplace especially where heavy infestations combine with unsanitary conditions and poverty.

== History ==
Tungiasis was endemic in pre-Columbian Andean society for centuries before discovery of T. penetrans as native to the West Indies. The first European description was published in 1526 by Gonzalo Fernández de Oviedo y Valdés, where he discussed the skin infestation and its symptoms on crew members from Columbus's Santa Maria after they were shipwrecked on Haiti. Through ship routes and further expeditions, the chigoe flea was spread to the rest of the world, particularly to the rest of Latin America and Africa. The spread to greater Africa occurred throughout the 17th and 19th centuries, specifically in 1873 when the infected crewmen of the Thomas Mitchell's ship introduced it into Angola, having sailed from Brazil.

== Tungiasis ==
Female T. penetrans embed themselves within the skin of a host and this can cause tungiasis. A large quantity of T. penetrans burrowing into an animal cause secondary bacterial infections with severe cases requiring amputation and death occurring in the most extreme cases.

=== Treatment ===
There are no drugs currently available with proven effectiveness. Surgical extraction still remains the treatment of choice in patients with a low parasite load, such as tourists returning from endemic areas. The only approach to reduce tungiasis-associated morbidity in heavily affected individuals is the application of a repellent to prevent the penetration of sand fleas.

== See also ==
- Tungiasis
