= Kuvungen Hill =

Hill in Queen Maud Land, Antarctica

Kuvungen Hill (73°50′S 5°9′W) is a hill just southeast of Framranten Point, near the southwest end of the Kirwan Escarpment in Queen Maud Land, Antarctica. It was mapped and named by Norwegian cartographers from surveys and air photos by the Norwegian–British–Swedish Antarctic Expedition (1949–52) and additional air photos (1958–59).

Framranten Point extends northwestward from the hill.
