= Tungiasis =

- Other names: Nigua, Pio and Bicho de pie, or Pique or Sand flea disease
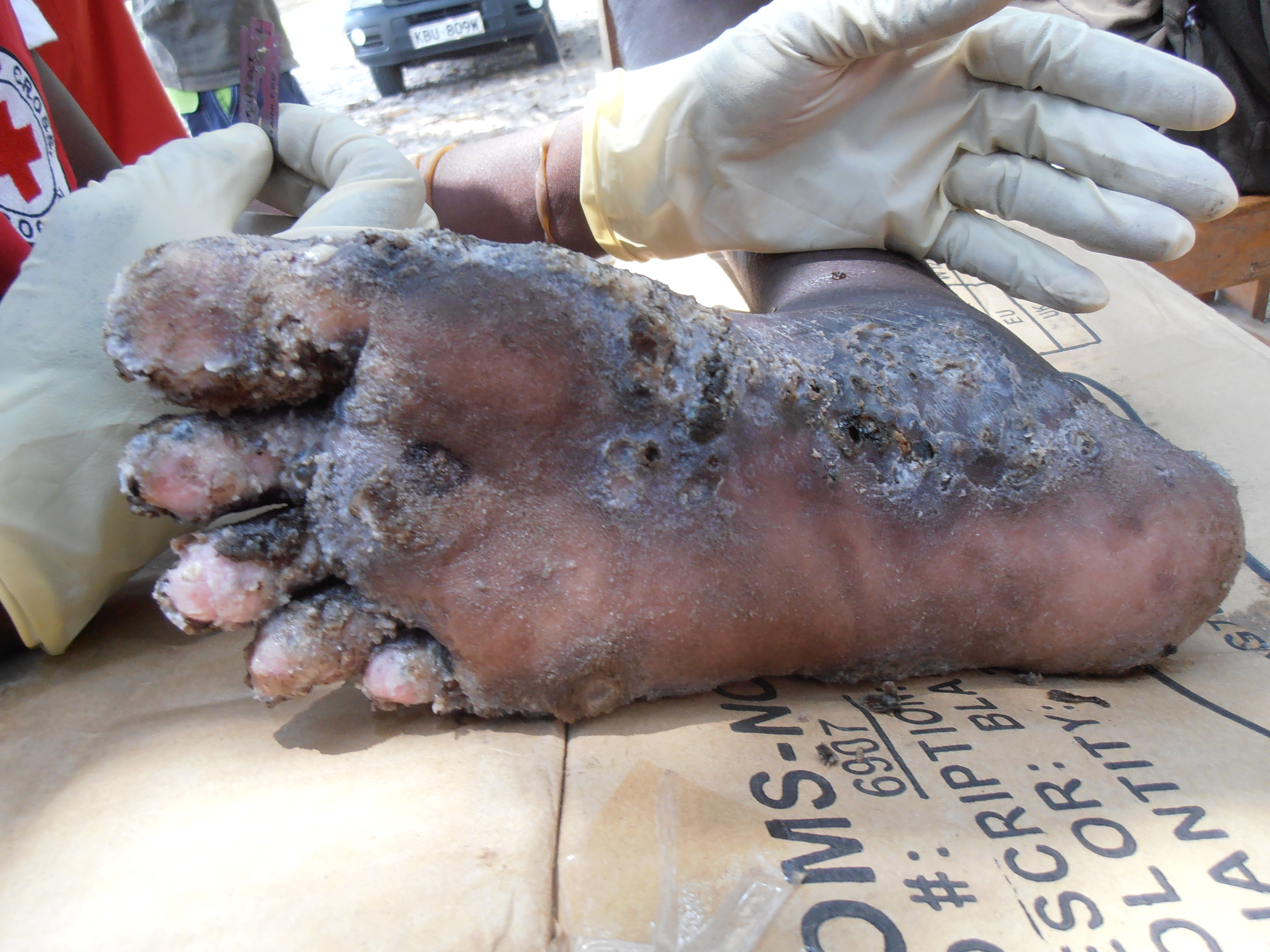
- Tungiasis on the foot
- Specialty: Infectious diseases

Tungiasis is an inflammatory skin disease caused by infection with the female ectoparasitic Tunga penetrans, a flea also known as the chigoe, chigo, chigoe flea, chigo flea, jigger, nigua, sand flea, or burrowing flea (and not to be confused with the chigger, a different arthropod). The flea and the disease that it causes are found in the tropical parts of Africa, the Caribbean, Central and South America, and India. Tunga penetrans is the smallest known flea, measuring 1 mm across. It is also known in Latin America as the nigua and bicho de pie (Spanish) or bicho de pé (Portuguese), literally "foot bug". Tunga penetrans is a member of the genus Tunga, which comprises 13 species.

Tungiasis causes skin inflammation, severe pain, itching, and a lesion at the site of infection that is characterized by a black dot at the center of a swollen red lesion, surrounded by what looks like a white halo. Desquamation of the skin is always seen, especially after the flea expands during hypertrophy.

As of 2009, tungiasis is present worldwide in 88 countries with varying degrees of incidence. This disease is of special public health concern in highly endemic areas such as Nigeria, Trinidad and Tobago, and Brazil, where its prevalence, especially in poor communities, has been known to approach 50%.

The chigoe flea is properly classified as a member of the order Siphonaptera as it is a flea. Although commonly referred to as chiggers, true chiggers are mites, which are minute arachnids. Mites penetrate the skin and feed on skin cells that are broken down by an enzyme they secrete from their mouthparts, but they do not lay eggs in the host as T. penetrans does. Moreover, in mites, the adult and the larval forms both feed on other animals. This is not the case with T. penetrans, as only the adults feed on mammals and it is only the female that stays attached to the host.

Tunga penetrans is also known by the following names: chigoe flea, sand flea, nigua, chigger flea, jigger flea, bicho de pé, pico, sikka, kuti, and piqui, among many others.

Another species of Tunga, T. trimamillata causes tungiasis in Ecuador and Peru.

== Signs and symptoms ==
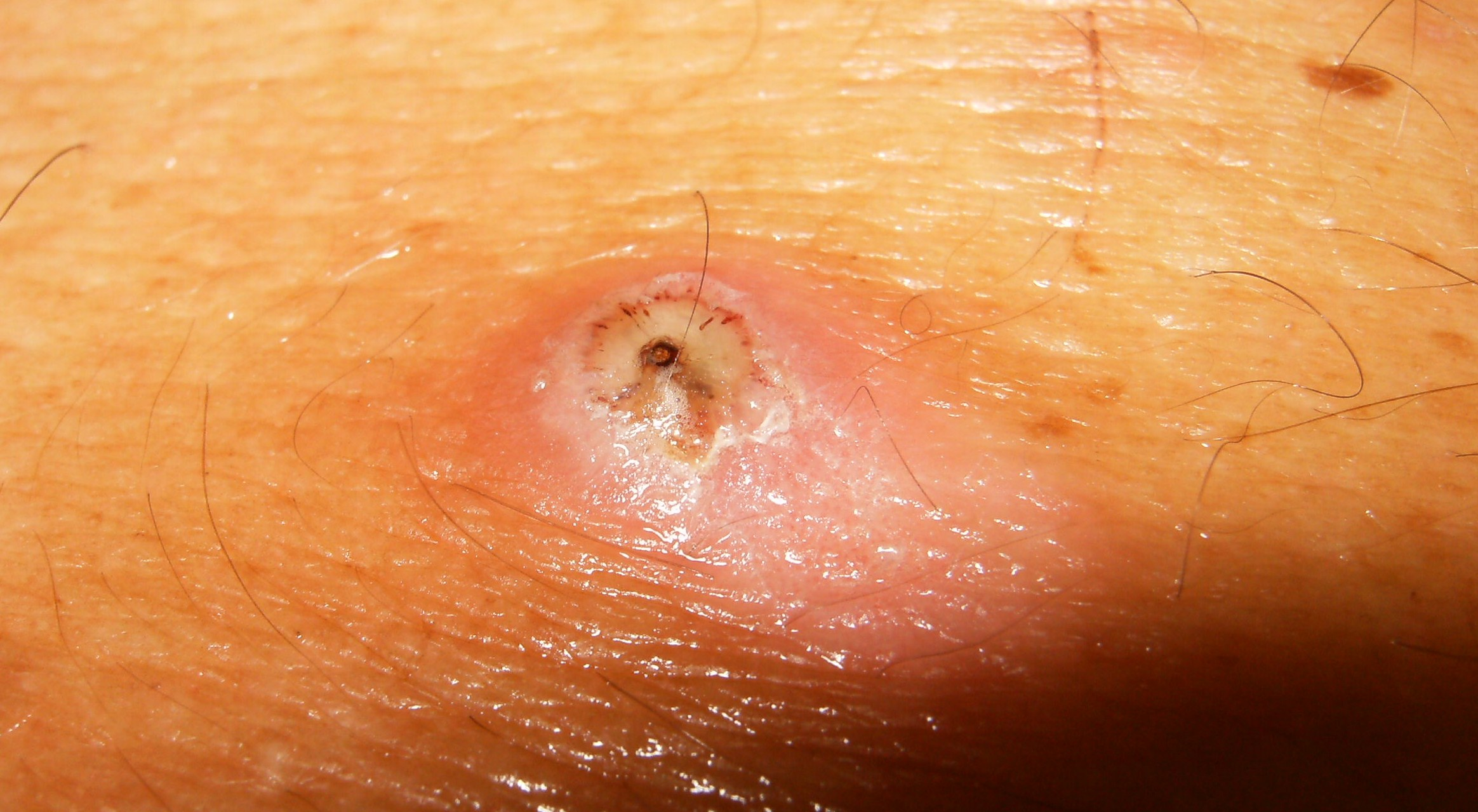
Tunga penetrans in human skin

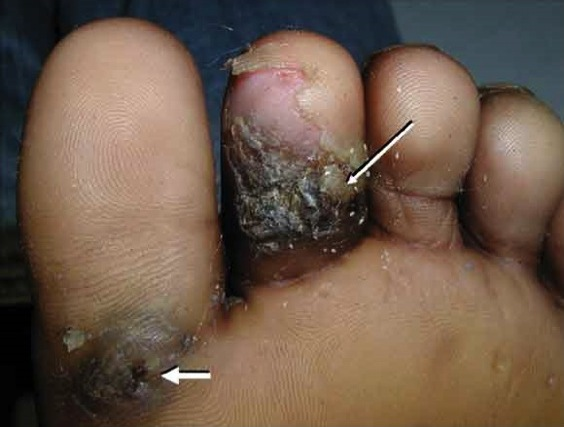
Typical Tunga penetrans presentation under human toes

The symptoms of this disease include:

- Severe pruritus
- Pain
- Inflammation and swelling
- Lesions and ulcerations, with black dots in the center

If a Tunga infection is left untreated, secondary infections, such as bacteremia, tetanus, necrosis and gangrene, may be expected.

In all cases, tungiasis by itself only caused morbidity, though secondary infection may lead to mortality. The life cycle section presents the Fortaleza stages from the flea's developmental perspective. The discussion is specific to symptoms of human infection. The clinical presentation in humans follows the Fortaleza Classification as the stage of infection will determine the symptoms present. The following discussion will give an overview of the symptoms beginning in stage 2 because patients are not likely to present themselves at the early stages of infection, mostly because the flea's burrowing is usually not felt. This may be due to a keratolytic enzyme secreted during stage 1.

The patient with a single flea may present as early as stage 2 when, though the erythema is barely perceptible, a boring pain and the curious sensation of unpleasant itching occur. This inflammatory reaction is the initial immunological response to the infestation. Heavily infested patients may not notice a stage 2 infection due to the other fleas' causing irritation as well. Feces may be seen, but this is more common in the 3rd stage. Around the third day after penetration, erythema and skin tenderness are felt, accompanied by pruritus (severe itching) and a black furuncular nodule surrounded by a white halo of stretched skin caused by the expansion of the flea. Fecal coils may protrude from the center of the nodule where the flea's anus is facing upward. They should be washed off quickly as the feces may remain in the skin unless removed. During this 3a substage, pain can be severe, especially at night or, if the nodule is on the foot, while walking. Eggs will also begin to be released and a watery secretion can be observed. The radical metamorphosis during the 3rd to 6th day after penetration, or neosomy, precedes the formation of a small caldera-like rim rampart as a result of the increased thickness of the flea's chitin exoskeleton. During the caldera formation, the nodule shrinks a bit and it looks as if it is beginning to dry out; this takes 2 weeks and comprises substage 3b.

At the third week after penetration and substage 4a, the eggs' release will have stopped and the lesion will become smaller and more wrinkled. As the flea is near death, fecal and water secretion will stop altogether. Pain, tenderness, and skin inflammation will still be present. Around the 25th day after penetration, the lesion looks like a black crust and the flea's carcass is removed by host repair mechanisms and the skin begins to heal. With the flea gone, inflammation may still persist for a while.

Although patients would not present within the 5th stage of tungiasis as the flea would be dead and no longer in the body, this stage is characterized by the reorganization of the skin (1–4 weeks) and a circular residue of 5–10 mm in diameter around the site in penetration. An intraepithelial abscess, which developed due to the presence of the flea, will drain and later heal. Although these disease residues would persist for a few months, tungiasis is no longer present.

In severe cases, ulcers are common, as well as complete tissue and nail deformation. A patient may be unable to walk due to severe pain if too many of the lesions are present in the feet. Suppuration (pus formation), tissue death, auto-amputation of digits (via ainhum), and chronic lymphedema may also be seen.

If the patient is not vaccinated, tetanus is often a complication due to secondary infection. Necrosis and gangrene are other common complications of severe infestation and superinfection. Staphylococcus aureus and Wolbachia endobacteria can be transmitted by the chigoe flea, as well as nearly 150 other different pathogens. For these reasons, the chigoe flea should be removed as soon as possible.

=== Incubation ===
Because of the relatively rapid onset of tungiasis, the incubation period tends to be short. Although some reddening around the site of penetration occurs, the first symptoms are perceived in stage 2 as itching and severe pain, usually a day after penetration.

== Cause ==
Tungiasis is caused by chigoe fleas (the term transmission does not apply because Tunga penetrans is itself responsible for the disease.) The preponderance of tungiasis lesions on the toes may be because chigoe flea is a poor jumper, attaining only a height of 20 cm. But the reality is more complex; for example, the jumping ability cannot explain why hands are the second-most affected body part. Lesions on the hands are better explained by playing in the sand and noting that hands are often used to remove sand from other parts of the body. The occurrence of tungiasis lesions on the toes, between them, and on the soles can be easily explained because most of the victims are poor, walk barefoot, and live in places where the sand (home to chigoe fleas) constitutes the floor. Rate of incidence therefore is greatly increased in poor communities and populations because of the lack of adequate housing. This occurs in significantly higher proportions during the peak of the dry season in local communities.

Tungiasis in humans and some domestic animals can also be caused by Tunga trimamillata, which is known to exist in Ecuador and Peru.

=== Reservoirs and transmission ===
T. penetrans has been documented to use various warm-blooded animals as reservoir hosts, including humans, pigs, dogs, cats, rats, sheep, cattle, donkeys, monkeys, birds, and elephants. These hosts directly propagate the disease by being the origin of the next generation of fleas. Once the female flea expels 100–200 eggs, the cycle of transmission begins again.

=== Lifecycle ===
T. penetrans eggs, on average, are 604 μm long, The larva will hatch from the egg within one to six days, assuming the environmental conditions (e.g., moisture, humidity, etc.) are favorable. After hatching, the flea will progress through two instar phases. This is unique in that most fleas go through three, instead. Over the course of that development, the flea will first decrease in size from its just-hatched size of 1,500 μm to 1,150 μm (first instar) before growing to 2,900 μm (second instar).

About 6 to 8 days after hatching, the larva pupates and builds a cocoon around itself. Because it lives mostly on and below the surface of the sand, sand is used to stabilize the cocoon and help to promote its development. An environmental disturbance such as rain or a lack of sand have been shown to decrease incidence, most likely due to decreasing the environmental factors (i.e., sand) on which the flea depends for overall growth. Barring any disturbances to the cocoon, an adult flea will emerge from the puparium after 9–15 days.

In the adult phase, the flea will occasionally feed on unsuspecting animals. Only once the female burrows into the skin can reproduction occur, as the male and female show no interest in each other in the wild. The male flea dies after copulation. The female flea continues in vivo ectodevelopment, described in stages by the Fortaleza classification of tungiasis.

=== Fortaleza classification ===
In a seminal paper on the biology and pathology of Tunga penetrans, Eisele et al. (2003) provided and detailed the five stages of tungiasis, thereby detailing the in vivo development of the female chigoe flea for the first time. In dividing the natural history of the disease, the Fortaleza Classification formally describes the last part of the female flea's life cycle where it burrows into its host's skin, expels eggs, and dies. Due to the nature of the discussion, overlap with other sections, particularly the one on symptoms, is unavoidable.

Stage 1 is characterized by the penetration of the skin by the female chigoe flea. Running along the body, the female uses its posterior legs to push its body upward by an angle of 45–90 degrees. Penetration then starts, beginning with the proboscis going through the epidermis.

By stage 2 (day 1–2), penetration is complete and the flea has burrowed most of its body into the skin. Only the anus, the copulatory organs, and four rear air holes in fleas called stigmata remain on the outside of the epidermis. The anus will excrete feces that is thought to attract male fleas for mating, described in a later section. The hypertrophic zone between tergites 2 and 3 in the abdominal region begins to expand a day or two after penetration and takes the appearance of a life belt. During this time, the flea begins to feed on the host's blood.

Stage 3 is divided into two substages, 3a and 3b. Stage 3a is 2–3 days after penetration is complete. In substage 3a, the flea's midsection swells, balloon-like, to the size of a pea. This expansion of the flea causes its integument to be stretched thin, a process called physogastrism. The swelling ends in the condition of physogastry, and results in the appearance of a white halo around a black dot at the center of the lesion. That dot is the rear end of the flea. In substage 3b, the chitin exoskeleton of tergites 2 and 3 increase in thickness, which gives the structure the look of a miniature caldera. Egg release is common in substage 3b, as are fecal coils. The eggs tend to stick to the skin.

At about the 3rd week after penetration, stage 4 begins, which is also divided into two substages. In 4a, the flea loses its signs of vitality and appears near death. As a result, the lesion shrinks in size, turns brown, and appears wrinkled. The death of the flea marks the beginning of substage 4b (around day 25 post-penetration) as the body begins to eliminate the parasite through skin repair mechanisms (e.g. shedding and subsequent skin repair). At this phase, the lesion is seen as brown or black.

By the 5th stage of tungiasis, the carcass of the T. penetrans flea has been expelled and there are circular skin residues of the infection that remain. There are only lingering symptoms at this time, described in the next section.

=== Morphology ===
In a study of 1000 freshly ejected T. penetrans eggs, it was found that females are generally smaller than males for all criteria. In some cases, though, females had a bigger epipharynx and maxillar palpus. Due to its burrowing activity, the chigoe flea has developed a well-developed lacinia and epipharynx that is used to penetrate the skin. Overall, the fleas' head is relatively flattened, which again aids in burrowing through the epidermal and dermal layers.

Investigators have also found that adult T. penetrans have different morphologies with respect to the shape of their head. Some have a rounded head, others have head shapes that resemble ski ramps more than anything else; still, others demonstrate head shapes that are very linear with a slight bulge at the nose. These morphologies were seen to be host-specific, as only fleas of some head-types were found in specific hosts. This, along with genetic differences among the T. penetrans fleas that infect different host animals, may suggest that there are several species of closely related species have been grouped taxonomically under one binomial nomenclature.

Though the chigoe flea resembles most others in morphology, the flea has a hypertrophic region between tergites 2 and 3. As stated in Eisele et al. (2003), tergites 2 and 3, as well as the abdominal sternites, stretch considerably and are bent apart. Chitinous clasps that are built for the abdominal enlargement surround these regions and hold onto the hypertrophic zone, giving them the appearance of a three-leafed clover. (See image 7 of the life cycle diagram.) Surprisingly, the rest of the flea, including the head and the thorax, do not change in shape.

With the rapid expansion of the flea, the morphology of the flea is now vastly different. It has gone from the smallest flea in the world to a bulging mass that measures 5–10 mm in diameter. This results in a volume that is 2000 to 3000 times what it used to be.

=== Reproduction ===
Females have a depression or groove at their abdominal end whereas the males have their protrusive copulatory organs in that same region. These morphological differences reflect the way the male and female copulate. In the first step toward copulation, the female penetrates an organism in an ungravid state. It is only there that the male will find her and copulate. Copulation of adults has not been observed in the wild. With the female reproductive organs pointing outward, the male will place his reproductive organs "in direction to the upright abdominal end of the female" to copulate. Having copulated for only a few seconds to 2 minutes, the male will then begin to search for another female. After copulation is complete, the male will die, although sometimes he will take a blood meal before doing so. Eggs will be expelled whether or not they have been fertilized.

The chigoe flea eggs' average length is 604 μm and the just hatched larvae, in their first instar, have an average length of 1,500 μm. At the second and last instar (T. penetrans is unique among the fleas in that it only has two, instead of three, instars.) the larvae decrease in size to 1,150 μm after growing to at least 2,900 μm. The development from instar 1 to instar 2 lasts less than one day.

On the whole, Tunga penetrans does not do very well in terms of its Darwinian fitness. In a laboratory setting in which different mediums were provided for larval growth, the rate of survival from egg to adult in the best medium was 1.05%. Only 15% of the eggs were found to develop into larvae, and of those, only 14% formed a cocoon. Moreover, only half of the pupae reached the adult phase, resulting in gender disequilibrium. Although these results reflect a laboratory setting, the general lack of success for T. penetrans's reproductive (opportunistic) R-strategy is surprising given the number of fleas that a single person can attract. The low survival rate suggests that a concentrated public health effort directed at any point in the flea's life cycle is likely to deal a crippling blow to the overall population of the flea in the area.

== Diagnosis ==
There are no diagnostic tests for tungiasis. This is most likely because the parasite is ectoparasitic with visible symptoms. Identification of the parasite through removal, and a patient's traveling history, should suffice for diagnosis, though the latter is clearly more useful than the former. Localization of the lesion may be a useful diagnostic method for the clinician. A biopsy may be done, though again, it is not required for diagnosis.

== Prevention ==
Due to the high number of hosts, eradication of tungiasis is not feasible, at least not easily so. Public health and prevention strategies should then be done with elimination as the target. Better household hygiene, including having a cemented rather than a sand floor, and washing it often, would lower the rates of tungiasis significantly.

Though vaccines would be useful, due to the ectoparasitic nature of chigoe flea, they are neither a feasible nor an effective tool against tungiasis. Nevertheless, due to the high incidence of secondary infection, those at risk of tungiasis should get vaccinated against tetanus. A better approach is to use repellents that specifically target the chigoe flea. One very successful repellent is called Zanzarin, a derivative of coconut oil, jojoba oil, and aloe vera. In a recent study involving two cohorts, the infestation rates dropped 92% on average for the first one and 90% for the other. Likewise, the intensity of the cohorts dropped by 86% and 87% respectively. The non-toxic nature of Zanzarin, combined with its "remarkable regression of the clinical pathology" make this a tenable public health tool against tungiasis.

The use of pesticide, like DDT, has also led to elimination of the Tunga penetrans, but this control/prevention strategy should be utilized very carefully, if at all, because of the possible side effects such pesticides can have on the greater biosphere. In the 1950s, there was a worldwide effort to eradicate malaria. As part of that effort, Mexico launched the Campaña Nacional para la Erradicación de Paludismo, or the National Campaign for the Eradication of Malaria. By spraying DDT in homes, the Anopheles a genus of mosquitoes known to carry the deadly Plasmodium falciparum was mostly eliminated. As a consequence of this national campaign, other arthropods were either eliminated or significantly reduced in number, including the reduviid bug responsible for Chagas disease (American Trypanosomiasis) and T. penetrans. Controlled, in-home spraying of DDT is effective as it gives the home immunity against arthropods while not contaminating the local water supplies and doing as much ecological damage as was once the case when DDT was first introduced.

While other species gradually gained resistance to DDT and other insecticides that were used, T. penetrans did not; as a result, the incidence of tungiasis in Mexico is very low when compared to the rest of Latin America, especially Brazil, where rates in poor areas have been known to be as high or higher than 50%. There was a 40-year period with no tungiasis cases in Mexico. It was not until August 1989 that three Mexican patients presented with the disease. Though there were other cases of tungiasis reported thereafter, all were acquired in Africa.

== Treatment ==
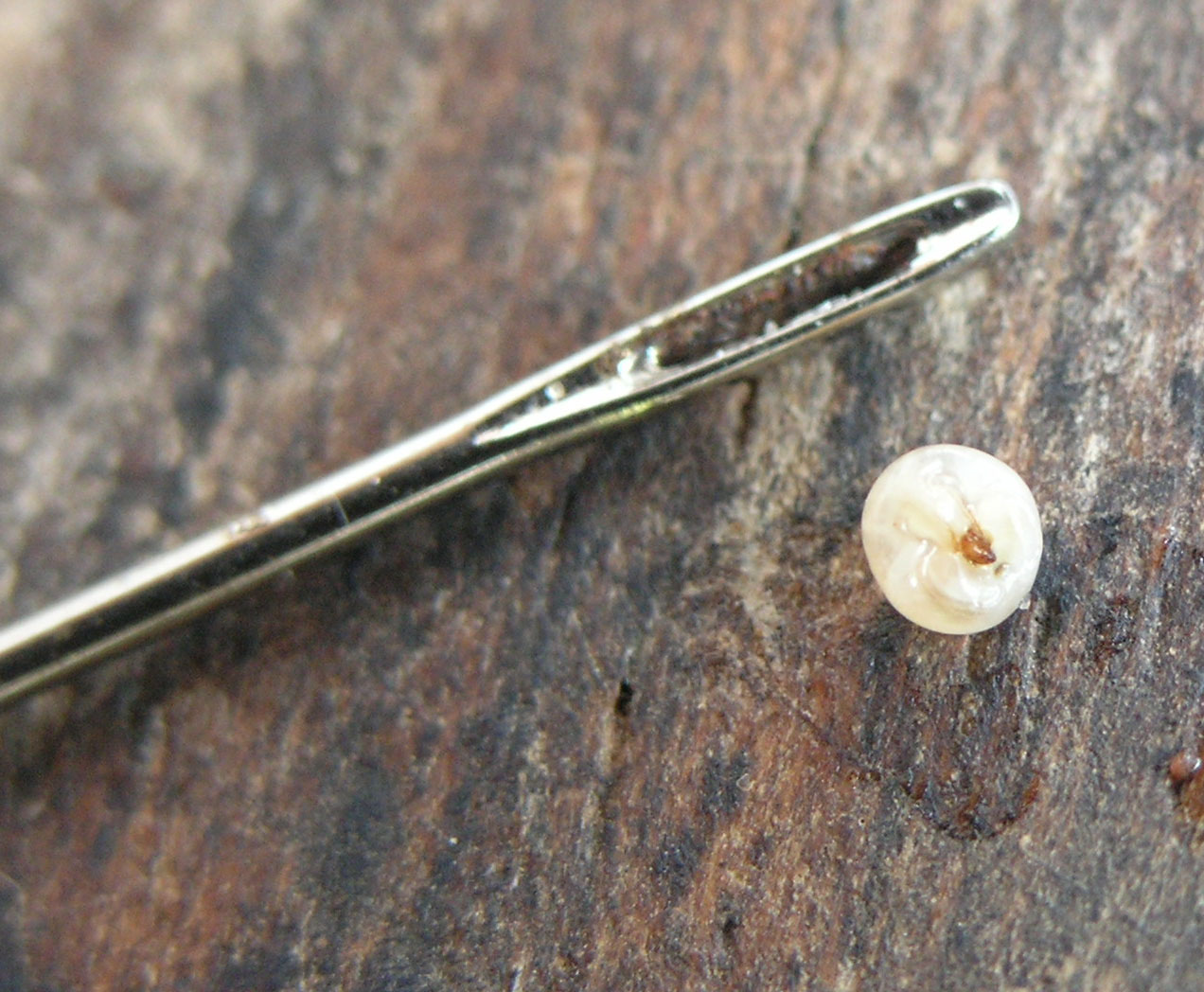
Removed parasite

As the disease is self-limiting, at least when exposure to the parasite is limited, management is mostly confined to treatment. Due to the secondary infection that can cause serious medical issues, the recommended course of action upon diagnosis is a surgical extraction of the fleas followed by the application of a topical antibiotic. Care should be taken to avoid tearing the flea during the extraction procedures as severe inflammation will result. The same will occur if part of the flea is left behind. Sterile equipment should always be used, as contaminated instruments could act as mechanical vectors for pathogens to enter the body.

There is no drug that has proven to be effective against embedded fleas. Oral niridazole was once considered a therapeutic drug, but well-designed studies are lacking and, given the severe adverse effects, this is one drug that is likely to cause more harm than good. However, it has some anecdotal evidence of lysing the fleas altogether. Oral ivermectin is considered by some in endemic areas to be a panacea against the fleas but studies using high doses have failed to validate this hypothesis. Other drugs such as topical ivermectin and metrifonate have been somewhat successful, but not enough to be significant. [2,5] For superinfections, trimethoprim, sulfamethoxazole, metronidazole, amoxicillin, (with/without clavulanate) have been used successfully, though these treat only secondary infections.

Successful topical treatments also include cryotherapy and electrodesiccation of the lesion. If formaldehyde, chloroform, or DDT are used topically, care should be taken when dealing with the resulting morbidity. The T. penetrans flea can also be suffocated using occlusive petrolatum, while Vaseline will kill the organism as well, most likely due to suffocation as the stigmata would be covered. The gum of the mammee apple (Mammea americana), a fruit that also goes by the name Saint Domingo apricot, has also been used to kill the chigoe flea, though this has not been reported in the main T. penetrans literature.

Topical treatment with low-viscosity dimethicone silicone oils, commonly used for head lice, is an emerging and effective method for suffocating parasites without the use of toxins. The World Health Organization has recognized this treatment as both highly effective and safe, based on extensive research and its application in severe cases of parasitic infestations. These low-cost oils have demonstrated a strong track record in the global treatment of even treatment-resistant head lice, making them a promising option for addressing this neglected tropical disease.

Even without treatment, the burrowed fleas will die within five weeks and are naturally sloughed off as the skin sheds.

== Epidemiology ==
For the most part, the chigoe flea lives 2–5 cm below the sand, an observation which helps explains its overall distribution. The temperature is generally too hot for the larvae to develop on the surface of the sand and the deeper sand does not have enough oxygen. This preferred ecological niche offers a way to decrease transmission among humans by investing in concrete grounds as opposed to the sand that is usually used in shacks and some favelas. Indeed, Nany et al. (2007) report that "In shacks with concreted ground being cleaned every day with water, Tunga [penetrans] larvae were hardly found."

In a longitudinal study conducted from March 2001 to January 2002, incidence of tungiasis was found to vary significantly with the local seasons of an endemic community in Brazil. In particular, the study found that "occurrence of tungiasis varies throughout the year and seems to follow local precipitation patterns. Maximum and minimum prevalence rates differed by more than a factor of three." The authors suggest that the correlation is due to the high humidity in the soil impairing larval development during the rainy season, as well as the more obvious reason that rain may simply wash away all stages of T. penetrans due its small size of 1 mm.

Acting as both biological vectors and definitive hosts, humans have spread Tunga penetrans from its isolated existence in the West Indies to all of Latin America and most of Africa via sea travel. Since the chigoe flea technically has no reservoir species and the female will cause tungiasis to any mammalian organism it can penetrate, this means the flea will have a relatively large number of hosts and victims. Epidemiologically, this is important as tungiasis often causes secondary infections.

== History ==
Tungiasis had been endemic in pre-Columbian Andean society for centuries before discovery of T. penetrans as native to the West Indies. The first case of tungiasis was described in 1526 by Gonzalo Fernández de Oviedo y Valdés, where he discussed the skin infection and its symptoms on crew members from Columbus's Santa Maria after they were shipwrecked on Haiti. Through ship routes and further expeditions, the chigoe flea was spread to the rest of the world, particularly to the rest of Latin America and Africa. The spread to greater Africa occurred throughout the 17th and 19th centuries, specifically in 1872 when the infected crewmen of the ship Thomas Mitchell introduced it into Angola by illegal dumping of sand ballast, having sailed from Brazil.
