= Gommen Valley =

Ice-filled valley in Antarctica

Gommen Valley (73°53′S 5°17′W) is an ice-filled valley between Tunga Spur and Kuven Hill, near the southwest end of the Kirwan Escarpment in Queen Maud Land, Antarctica. It was mapped by Norwegian cartographers from surveys and air photos by the Norwegian–British–Swedish Antarctic Expedition (1949–52) and from additional air photos (1958–59), and named Gommen (the gum).
