= Kuven Hill =

Hill in Queen Maud Land, Antarctica

Kuven Hill (73°52′S 5°15′W) is a prominent hill between Gommen Valley and Kuvsletta Flat, near the southwest end of the Kirwan Escarpment in Queen Maud Land, Antarctica. It was mapped by Norwegian cartographers from surveys and air photos by the Norwegian–British–Swedish Antarctic Expedition (1949–52) and additional air photos (1958–59), and named Kuven (the hump).
