= Utrinden Point =

Utrinden Point (73°50′S 5°18′W) is a rock point at the northwest side of Kuven Hill, near the southwest end of the Kirwan Escarpment in Queen Maud Land. Mapped by Norwegian cartographers from surveys and air photos by NGSAE (1949–52) and additional air photos (1958–59), and named Utrinden (the outer ridge).
