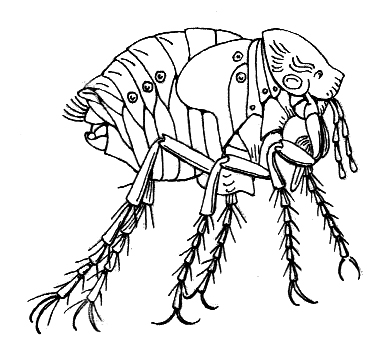
- Tunga penetrans

Scientific classification
- Kingdom: Animalia
- Phylum: Arthropoda
- Clade: Pancrustacea
- Class: Insecta
- Order: Siphonaptera
- Suborder: Pulicomorpha
- Superfamily: Pulicoidea
- Family: Hectopsyllidae; Baker, 1904

Genera
- Tunga (incl. Tunga penetrans); Hectopsylla

Synonyms
- Hectopsyllinae Baker, 1904 (but see text); Sarcopsyllidae Taschenberg, 1880; Sarcopsyllinae Taschenberg, 1880; Tungidae Fox, 1925 (1880); Tunginae Fox, 1925 (1880)

= Hectopsyllidae =

Family of fleas

Hectopsyllidae is a small family of fleas, containing only the genera Tunga and Hectopsylla. They were formerly known as Tungidae, and by authorities that demote the Pulicoidea to family rank they are treated as subfamily Hectopsyllinae (formerly Tunginae). Only two genera with some handfuls of species are placed here nowadays, making further subdivision of the family unnecessary.

These fleas usually parasitize terrestrial mammals, and in a few cases birds and bats. Hectopsylla narium was found to live inside the nostrils of the burrowing parrot (Cyanoliseus patagonus patagonus). The females are by and large immobile and will remain attached to the same place for prolonged periods of time, possibly until they die. Females are neosomatic, meaning that they swell up greatly while producing new cuticle, resulting in structures known as neosomes.

The closest living relatives of the Hectopsyllidae are the common fleas, Pulicidae. The Hectopsyllidae differ from these by the following characteristics:

- Antennal club with punctiform sensilla
- Dorsal and medial setae on the abdominal terga of the female reduced
- Left and right sensilia separated midways and with eight sensory pits
- Proximal arm of ninth sternite lobe-shaped
- Well-sclerotized and crisply outlined lateral lamina of the aedeagal apodeme

In addition, they have reduced setae on the antennal flagellum, but this may be an adaptation bearing little phylogenetic information.
