= Tunga Spur =

Ridge of Queen Maud Land

Coordinates: 73°54′S 5°20′W

Tunga Spur is a prominent rock spur extending from the Kirwan Escarpment just southwest of Gommen Valley, in Queen Maud Land. Mapped by Norwegian cartographers from surveys and air photos by Norwegian-British-Swedish Antarctic Expedition (NBSAE) (1949–52) and additional air photos (1958–59), and named Tunga (the tongue).
