= Incisor procumbency =

Orientation of the upper incisor in rodents

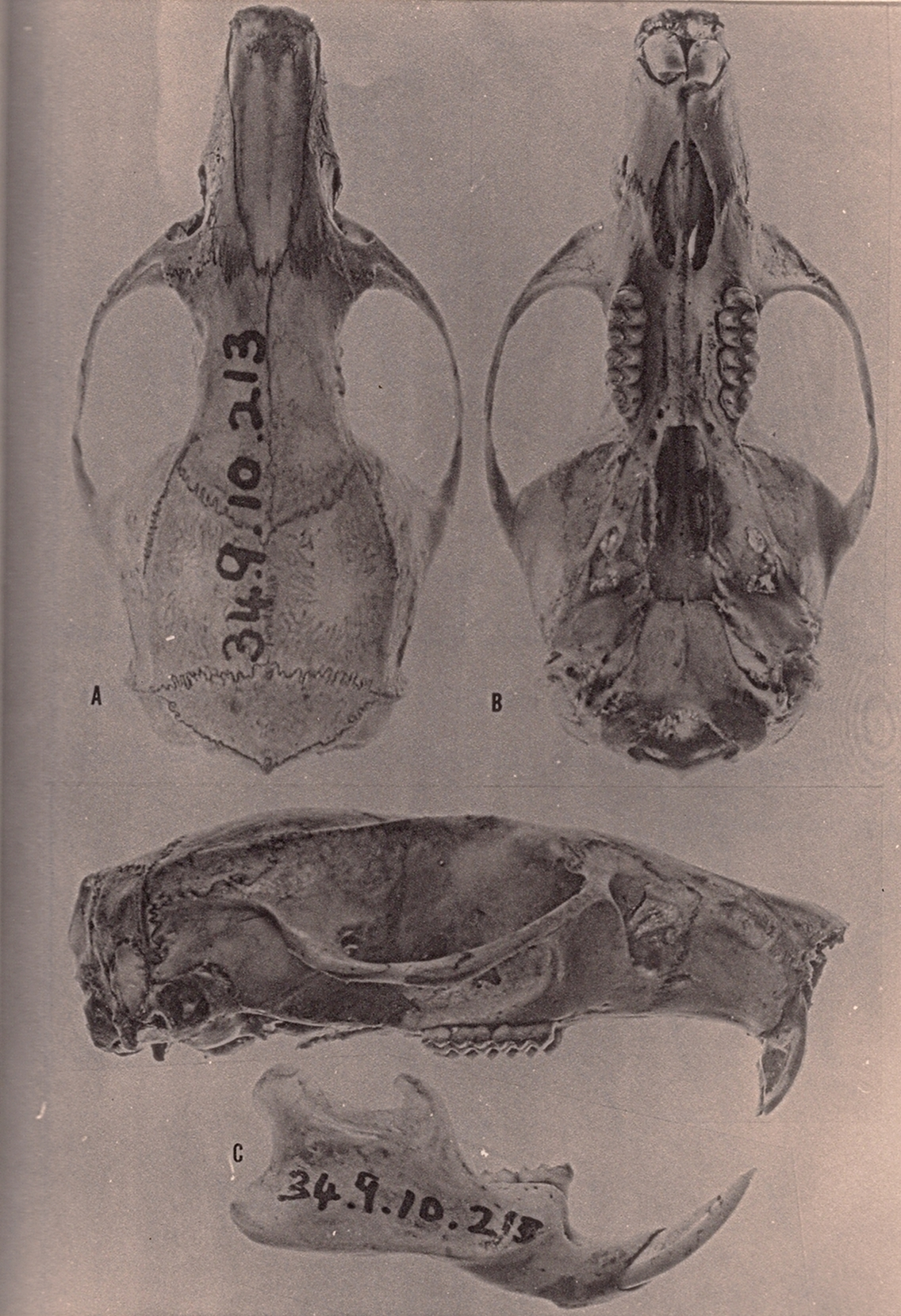
Mindomys hammondi has orthodont upper incisors.

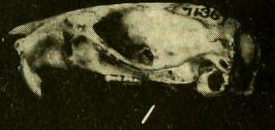
The marsh rice rat (Oryzomys palustris) has opisthodont upper incisors.

In rodents, incisor procumbency refers to the orientation of the upper incisor, defined by the position of the cutting edge of the incisor relative to the vertical plane of the incisors. Proodont (or procumbent) incisors have the cutting edge in front of the vertical plane, orthodont teeth have it perpendicular to the plane, opisthodont incisors have it behind the plane, and hyper-opisthodont teeth have the cutting edge even behind the back of the alveolus of the incisor.

Phyllotini are mostly opisthodont, but Auliscomys and Galenomys are orthodont and have sometimes even been described as proodont, and Eligmodontia, Loxodontomys, and some species of Calomys are hyper-opisthodont. Irenomys, Reithrodon, and Neotomys, formerly classified as phyllotines, are also hyper-opisthodont. Oryzomyini are also mostly opisthodont, but Amphinectomys savamis, Handleyomys fuscatus, Melanomys caliginosus, Mindomys hammondi, Scolomys melanops, and Sigmodontomys aphrastus are orthodont.

== Literature cited ==
- Steppan, S.J. 1995. Revision of the tribe Phyllotini (Rodentia: Sigmodontinae), with a phylogenetic hypothesis for the Sigmodontinae. Fieldiana Zoology 80:1–112.
- Weksler, M. 2006. Phylogenetic relationships of oryzomyine rodents (Muroidea: Sigmodontinae): separate and combined analyses of morphological and molecular data. Bulletin of the American Museum of Natural History 296:1–149.
