= Framranten Point =

Headland in Antarctica

Framranten Point (73°49′S 5°13′W) is a rocky point that extends northwestward from Kuvungen Hill, near the southwest end of the Kirwan Escarpment in Queen Maud Land, Antarctica. It was mapped by Norwegian cartographers from surveys and air photos by the Norwegian–British–Swedish Antarctic Expedition (1949–52) and from additional air photos (1958–59), and named Framranten.
