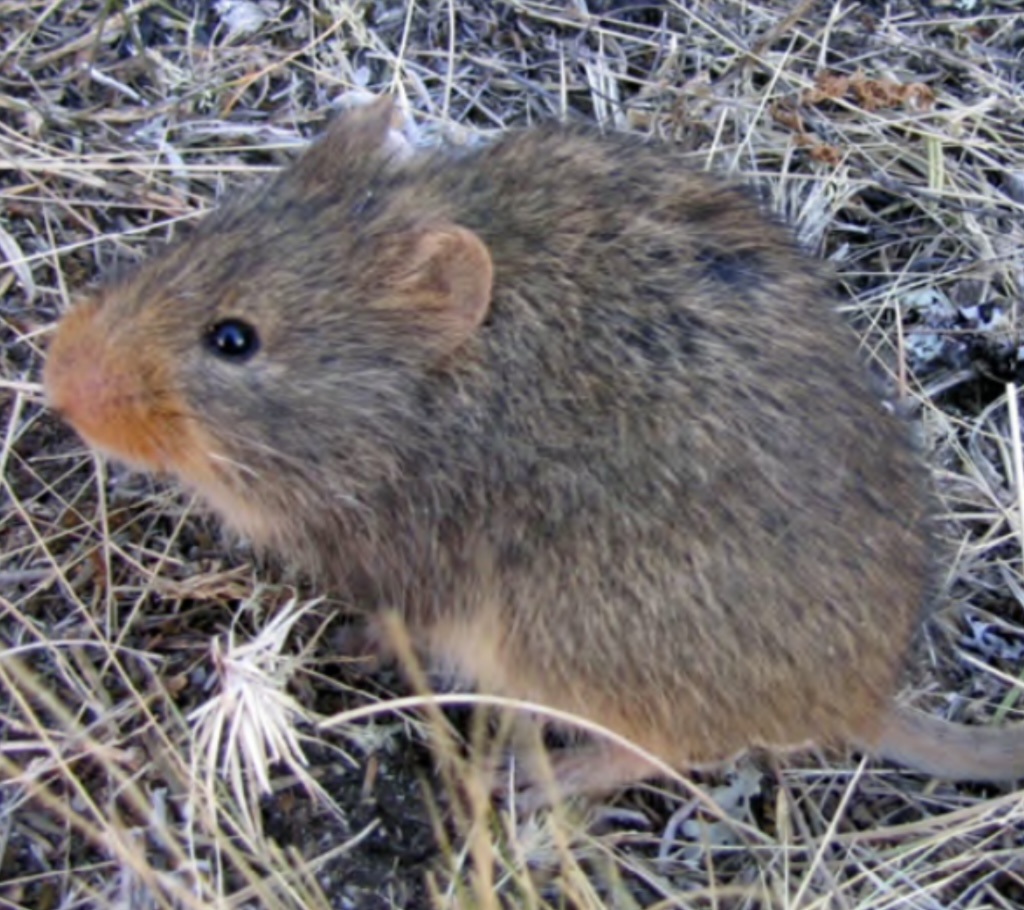
- Neotomys ebriosus

Conservation status
- Least Concern (IUCN 3.1)

Scientific classification
- Kingdom: Animalia
- Phylum: Chordata
- Class: Mammalia
- Order: Rodentia
- Family: Cricetidae
- Subfamily: Sigmodontinae
- Tribe: Phyllotini
- Genus: Neotomys; Thomas, 1894
- Species: N. ebriosus

Binomial name
- Neotomys ebriosus Thomas, 1894

= Andean swamp rat =

Species of rodent

The Andean swamp rat (Neotomys ebriosus) is a species of rodent in the family Cricetidae. It is the only species in the genus Neotomys. It is found in Argentina, Bolivia, Chile, and Peru.
