= Akodon sylvanus =

Conservation status
- Least Concern (IUCN 3.1)

Scientific classification
- Kingdom: Animalia
- Phylum: Chordata
- Class: Mammalia
- Order: Rodentia
- Family: Cricetidae
- Subfamily: Sigmodontinae
- Genus: Akodon
- Species: A. sylvanus

Binomial name
- Akodon sylvanus Thomas, 1921
- Known collection localities of Akodon sylvanus

Species of rodent

Akodon sylvanus, also known as the forest grass mouse or woodland akodont, is a species of rodent in the family Cricetidae. It is found only in a small part of northwestern Argentina.
