= Puno grass mouse =

Conservation status
- Least Concern (IUCN 3.1)

Scientific classification
- Kingdom: Animalia
- Phylum: Chordata
- Class: Mammalia
- Order: Rodentia
- Family: Cricetidae
- Subfamily: Sigmodontinae
- Genus: Akodon
- Species: A. subfuscus

Binomial name
- Akodon subfuscus Osgood, 1944

Species of rodent

The Puno grass mouse (Akodon subfuscus) is a species of rodent in the family Cricetidae. It is found in Bolivia and Peru.
