= Akodon polopi =

Conservation status
- Least Concern (IUCN 3.1)

Scientific classification
- Kingdom: Animalia
- Phylum: Chordata
- Class: Mammalia
- Order: Rodentia
- Family: Cricetidae
- Subfamily: Sigmodontinae
- Genus: Akodon
- Species: A. polopi

Binomial name
- Akodon polopi Jayat, Ortiz, Salazar-Bravo, Pardiñas & D'Elía, 2010

Species of rodent

Akodon polopi is a species of rodent in the family Cricetidae. It is found in Argentina.
