= Tunga (flea) =

Scientific classification
- Kingdom: Animalia
- Phylum: Arthropoda
- Class: Insecta
- Order: Siphonaptera
- Family: Hectopsyllidae
- Genus: Tunga; Jarocki, 1838

Genus of fleas

Tunga is a genus of fleas belonging to the family Hectopsyllidae.

The genus has almost cosmopolitan distribution.

Species:

- Tunga bondari Wagner, 1932
- Tunga caecata (Enderlein, 1901)
- Tunga penetrans Linnaeus, 1758
