= Altiplano grass mouse =

Conservation status
- Least Concern (IUCN 3.1)

Scientific classification
- Kingdom: Animalia
- Phylum: Chordata
- Class: Mammalia
- Order: Rodentia
- Family: Cricetidae
- Subfamily: Sigmodontinae
- Genus: Akodon
- Species: A. lutescens

Binomial name
- Akodon lutescens J. A. Allen, 1901

Synonyms
- Akodon puer

Species of rodent

The Altiplano grass mouse (Akodon lutescens) is a species of rodent in the family Cricetidae. It is found in Bolivia, and Peru.
