= Turbine hall (disambiguation) =

A turbine hall is a building or room in a power plant. Examples of current or former turbine halls include:

- The Turbine Hall (Tate Modern), exhibition space
- Portland General Electric Turbine Hall, historic power plant now part of the Oregon Museum of Science and Industry
