= Oregon Museum of Science and Industry =

Science and technology museum in Portland, Oregon

- Location within Portland, Oregon
- Established: November 5th, 1944; 81 years ago
- Location: Portland, Oregon, U.S.
- Coordinates: 45°30′30″N 122°39′56″W
- Type: private: science, industry
- Visitors: 778,457 (2002)
- President: Erin Graham
- Public transit access: OMSI/SE Water station AB SE Water/OMSI Trimet bus routes FX2, 9, 17, and 19
- Website: omsi.edu

The Oregon Museum of Science and Industry (OMSI, /ˈɒmziː/ OM-zee) is a science and technology museum aimed at children and teens in Portland, Oregon, United States. It contains three auditoriums, including a large-screen theatre, planetarium, and exhibition halls with hands-on permanent exhibits focused on natural sciences, industry, and technology. OMSI also regularly utilizes transient exhibits focusing on other disciplines.

== History ==
Beginning in 1903, odd artifacts were displayed in hallways and alcoves in Portland City Hall arranged by Colonel L. L. Hawkins. When the collection was evicted in 1936, about 12,000 artifacts were stored throughout the city.

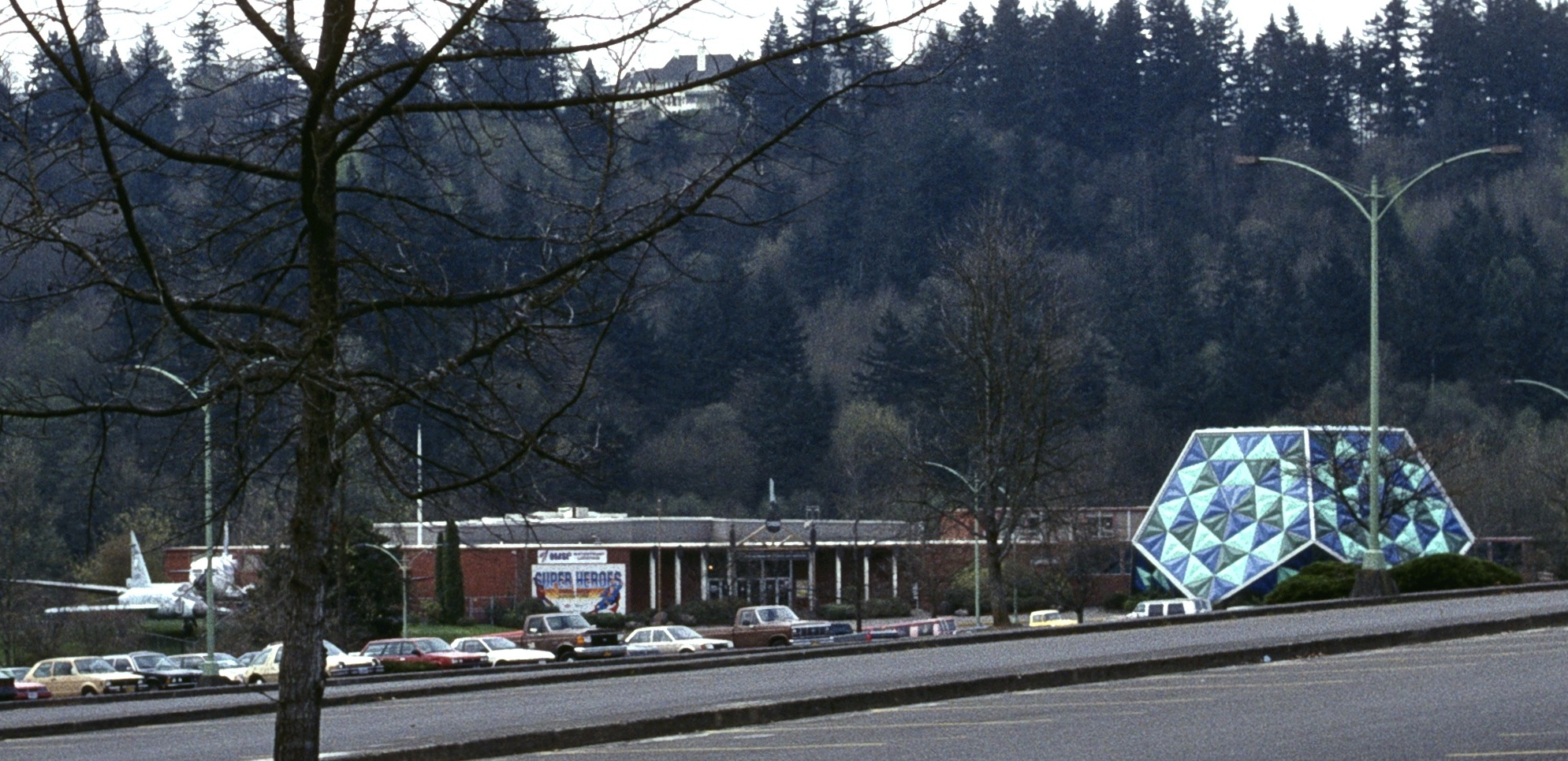
The former location of OMSI from 1958 to 1992, pictured in 1994 as the OMSI Educational Resource Center, with planetarium building in front

On November 5, 1944, the Oregon Museum Foundation was founded with the mission of establishing an Oregon Museum of History, Science, and Industry. It displayed its first collection of natural history objects at the Portland Hotel. Subsequent small exhibits occurred around town to generate interest and donations. In 1949, a house at 908 NE Hassalo St. was donated by Ralph B Lloyd, the Lloyd of the Lloyd District and Lloyd Center to establish the museum. Within a year, the Pacific Northwest's first public planetarium opened in a dome on the front lawn.

By 1955, OMSI's annual attendance had grown to 25,000. The need for expansion led volunteers to build a new site at Washington Park, achieving the original goal of establishing a hands-on museum. It opened to the public on August 3, 1958, following a formal dedication by the governor on June 7. A planetarium was again included. The new building at the southwest corner of what was then Hoyt Park (now part of Washington Park) was located adjacent to the then-new site of the Portland Zoo (now the Oregon Zoo), which began a one-year phased move in the same month as the new OMSI was dedicated. The two attractions remained neighbors, sharing a parking lot, until 1992. The planetarium at the Washington Park site was originally a 90-seat facility housed in a temporary dome; in 1967, it was replaced by a larger 142-seat facility in a distinctive dodecahedral (12-sided) building equipped with a new projector.

=== 1992 move ===
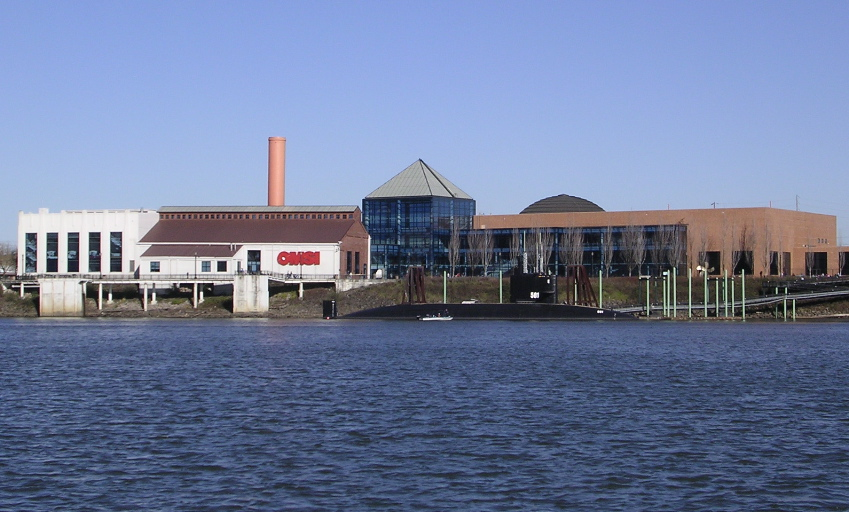
OMSI viewed from the Willamette River

By the mid-1980s, 600,000 people per year were visiting the building, which was designed for only 100,000. Expansion at the Washington Park site was deemed infeasible, and in 1986 it was announced that the museum would move to a new location on the east bank of the Willamette River, where a much larger building would be constructed. Property that included the historic Station L power plant was donated by Portland General Electric, and building construction was paid for by a fundraising campaign. In 1992, OMSI opened at the new site, which continues to be the current location. (The building at the Washington Park site later in 2001 became the Portland Children's Museum.) The construction integrated the existing PGE turbine building and included the creation of a 330-seat OMNIMAX theater. The facility also includes a 200-seat planetarium with Digistar 3 technology.

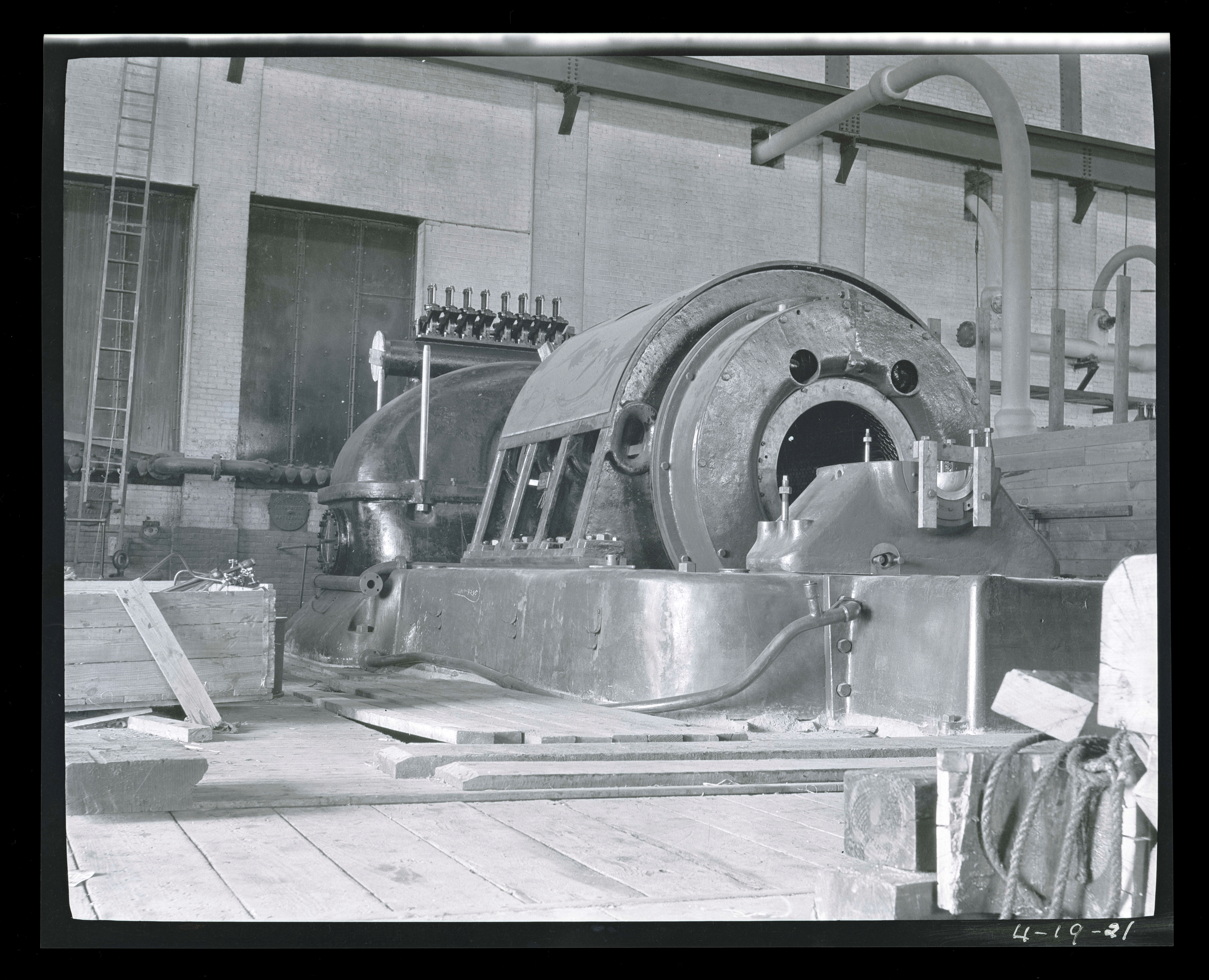
Turbine being assembled

=== 21st century ===
In 2004, the Turbine Hall was closed from September through November for renovations in which the Discovery Space and Technology Lab changed places and a new Inventors Ballroom was added. Also added were a small staging area for public exhibit demonstrations and a bridge connecting a new metal staircase with the mezzanine exhibits.

The museum started planning for an expansion of the facility in 2006. In 2008, OMSI began finalizing the plans for the expansion, which was estimated to cost about $500 million and would double the size of the museum. They began working to secure the funds for the expansion in 2009, but decided to hold off on the plans in 2010 after the poor economy had made it difficult to try to raise funds for the project. In 2023, the city of Portland Design Commission approved a new hub in Central Eastside. This hub would be designed for science learning, arts, and culture. These plans would renovate a 10-block district and construct 1,200 units of housing space (with a focus on Indigenous heritage) and public green space.

The OMNIMAX dome theater, an IMAX theatre located within the premises, closed in September of 2013 to be converted into a traditional flat-screen theatre. The current screen is classified as a Premium large format (PLF) screen, measuring approximately four stories in height.The theatre was officially renamed to the 'Empirical Theater' and reopened in December 2013.

As part of the COVID-19 pandemic, the museum received between $2 million and $5 million in federally backed small business loans from Heritage Bank as part of the Paycheck Protection Program.

== Exhibits and attractions ==
OMSI has five different specialized exhibit halls, a planetarium, and a submarine exhibit.

=== USS Blueback ===
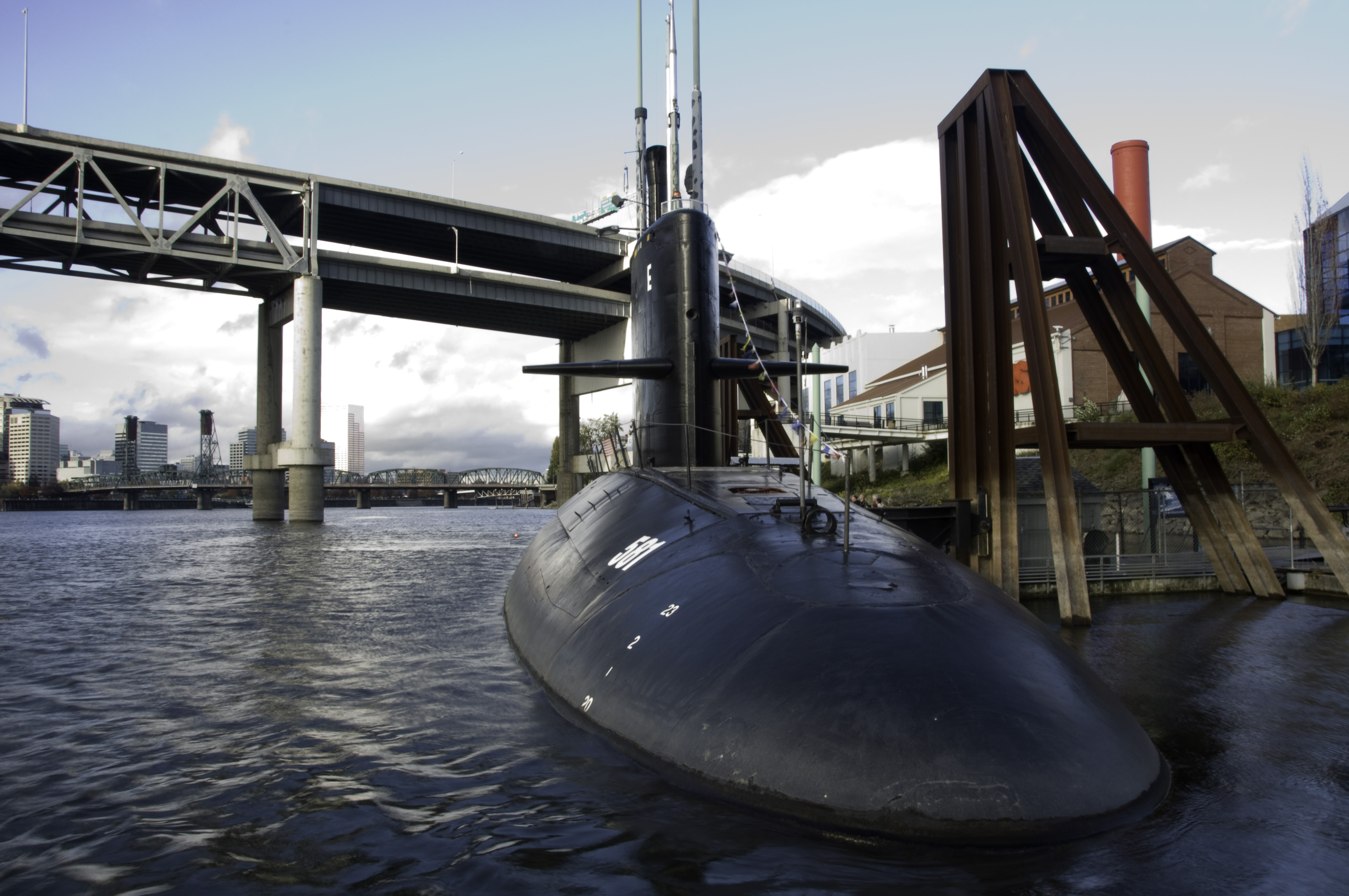
The USS Blueback submarine at rest on the Willamette River in front of OMSI. The Marquam and Hawthorne bridges are in the background.

The USS Blueback (SS-581) was purchased by OMSI in February 1994. This submarine appeared in the 1990 film The Hunt for Red October before being towed to its present location, a pier adjacent to the museum. It was opened to the public on May 15, 1994, and was added to the National Register of Historic Places in September 2008. The propeller is a National Submarine Memorial located outside of the main museum area, beside the Eastbank Esplanade. The submarine is available for daily guided tours and sleepovers.

=== Featured Exhibit Hall ===
The Featured Exhibit Hall is used for temporary exhibits created by OMSI or those brought in from museums around the world. Past exhibits have included "Grossology" (Winter–Spring 2001), "Giants of the Gobi" (1997), "A T-rex named Sue" (September 2001 – January 2002), and "CSI: The Experience" (May–September 2009). Gunther von Hagens' Body Worlds 3, opened on June 7, 2007, and closed on October 7, 2007. By late September 2007, the exhibit had received 300,000 visitors, setting the record as OMSI's most visited traveling exhibit. In September 2015, OMSI hosted the National Guitar Museum's exhibition "GUITAR: The Instrument That Rocked the World."

List of featured and traveling exhibits at OMSI
Start date	End date	Exhibit	Links	References/notes
March 1, 1997	September 1, 1997	Giants of the Gobi		
Winter 2001	Spring 2001	Grossology	Website	
September 2001	January 2002	A T-Rex Named Sue	Website	
June 7, 2007	October 7, 2007	Gunther von Hagens's Body Worlds 3	Website	
May 2009	September 2009	CSI: The Experience	Website	(Note: Web page no longer works due to lack of Adobe Flash Player support)
December 2009	January 2011	Samson the Colossal T. Rex Discovery		
January 30, 2010	May 31, 2010	Space: A Journey to Our Future	Website	
July 2, 2011	September 18, 2011	Game On 2.0	Website	
September 2012	January 6, 2013	Grossology	Website	
September 2015	January 10, 2016	GUITAR: The Instrument That Rocked The World	Website	
October 2, 2015	January 3, 2016	Genome: Unlocking Life's Code	Website	
February 13, 2016	May 8, 2016	Game Masters	Website	
June 18, 2016	January 8, 2017	Journey to Space	Website	
February 18, 2017	May 29, 2017	The Art of the Brick	Website	
June 24, 2017	October 22, 2017	Pompeii		
November 18, 2017	February 19, 2018	Illusion: Nothing Is as It Seems	Website	
March 17, 2018	September 3, 2018	Robot Revolution	Website	
October 6, 2018	January 27, 2019	Discovery of King Tut		
February 23, 2019	September 2, 2019	The Science Behind Pixar	Website	
October 5, 2019	February 17, 2020	Christopher Marley's Exquisite Creatures	Website	
March 20, 2021	September 6, 2021	Dinosaurs Revealed	Website	
March 2022	September 2022	The World of Leonardo da Vinci	Website	
October 8, 2022	April 9, 2023	Marvel: Universe of Super Heroes	Website	
May 13, 2023	January 28, 2024	Orcas: Our Shared Future	Website	
March 2, 2024	September 8, 2024	Tyrannosaurs – Meet the Family	Website	
October 10, 2024	Feb. 17, 2025	Exquisite Creatures Revealed	Website	
March 15, 2025	Sept. 1, 2025	Jurassic World by Brickman	Website	
March 21, 2026	October 18, 2026	TITANIC: The Artifact Exhibition	Website	

=== Turbine Hall ===
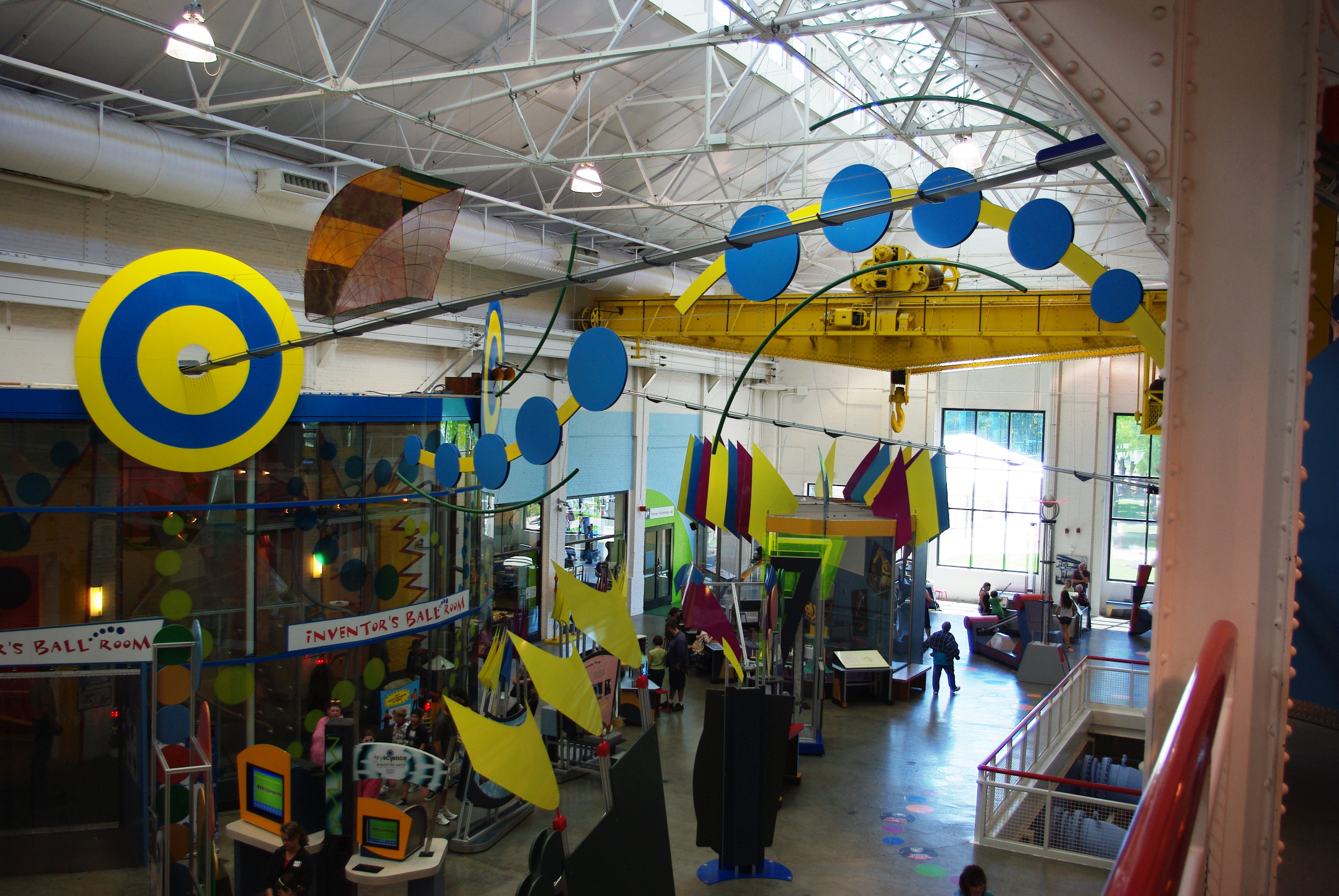
Turbine Hall

The Turbine Hall is named for the large retired steam turbine from its days as a PGE power plant. It features exhibits about engineering, physics, chemistry, and space travel. The Turbine Hall has two floors. On the main floor are the large exhibits and enrichment areas. On the mezzanine there are smaller exhibits.

The Innovation Station includes hands-on exhibits related to technology and invention. Laboratories for physics, chemistry, technology, and laser holography are connected to the Turbine Hall.

The Chemistry Lab is the first hands-on wet chemistry laboratory in the nation. There are six stations that allow visitors to learn about chemical interactions by participating in experiments that share a common theme. Themes rotate weekly and include the chemistry of toys, the nature of matter, biochemistry, environmental chemistry, industrial chemistry, chemical reactions, everyday chemistry, and crime scene chemistry. Chemical reaction demonstrations are given daily and are often related to the weekly theme.

Physics Lab exhibits include a Van de Graaff generator (a static electricity generator), motion detectors, electrical circuits, Morse code, magnets, computers that simulate basic properties of physics, and musical instruments.

The Laser/Holography Lab, which is open for approximately one hour every day, presents 30-minute demonstrations constructing a hologram.

The Vernier Technology Lab investigates the impact of technology on society. Rotating interactive exhibits allow visitors to investigate technologies such as robots and computers, security technology, biomedical technology, communications technology, and household technology. Visitors can also use a wide variety of educational software on internet-connected computers.

=== Life Sciences Hall ===
The Life Sciences Hall, on the second floor of the museum, offers exhibits about biology. These include a collection of preserved fetuses at nearly every stage of development, from a few weeks after conception to full-term, and the exhibit Amazing Feats of Aging, which is concerned with the biology of aging. One of the features of this exhibit is the Age Machine, a computer program that allows visitors to capture and then "age" a picture of themselves. The Life Sciences Hall also contains the Life Science Laboratory and the Earth Science Hall.

The Life Sciences Laboratory houses a wide variety of live animals, such as rats, walking sticks, chameleons, Madagascar hissing cockroaches, other mammals, reptiles, amphibians, and insects. Volunteers and staff members demonstrate and lead a variety of a group activities such as owl pellet dissections and exploration of the differences between male and female skulls and pelvises.

=== Earth Science Hall ===
The Earth Science Hall, located on the second floor, features geology-oriented exhibits and two specialized laboratories. The Watershed Laboratory gives visitors an experience in constructing an erosion cycle out of a physical model of a river. Visitors can learn about the life cycle of salmon and investigate microscopic organisms from local waterways through a video microscope. Visitors to the Paleontology Laboratory watch staff members and volunteers excavating fossils, such as dinosaur bones.

=== Science Playground ===
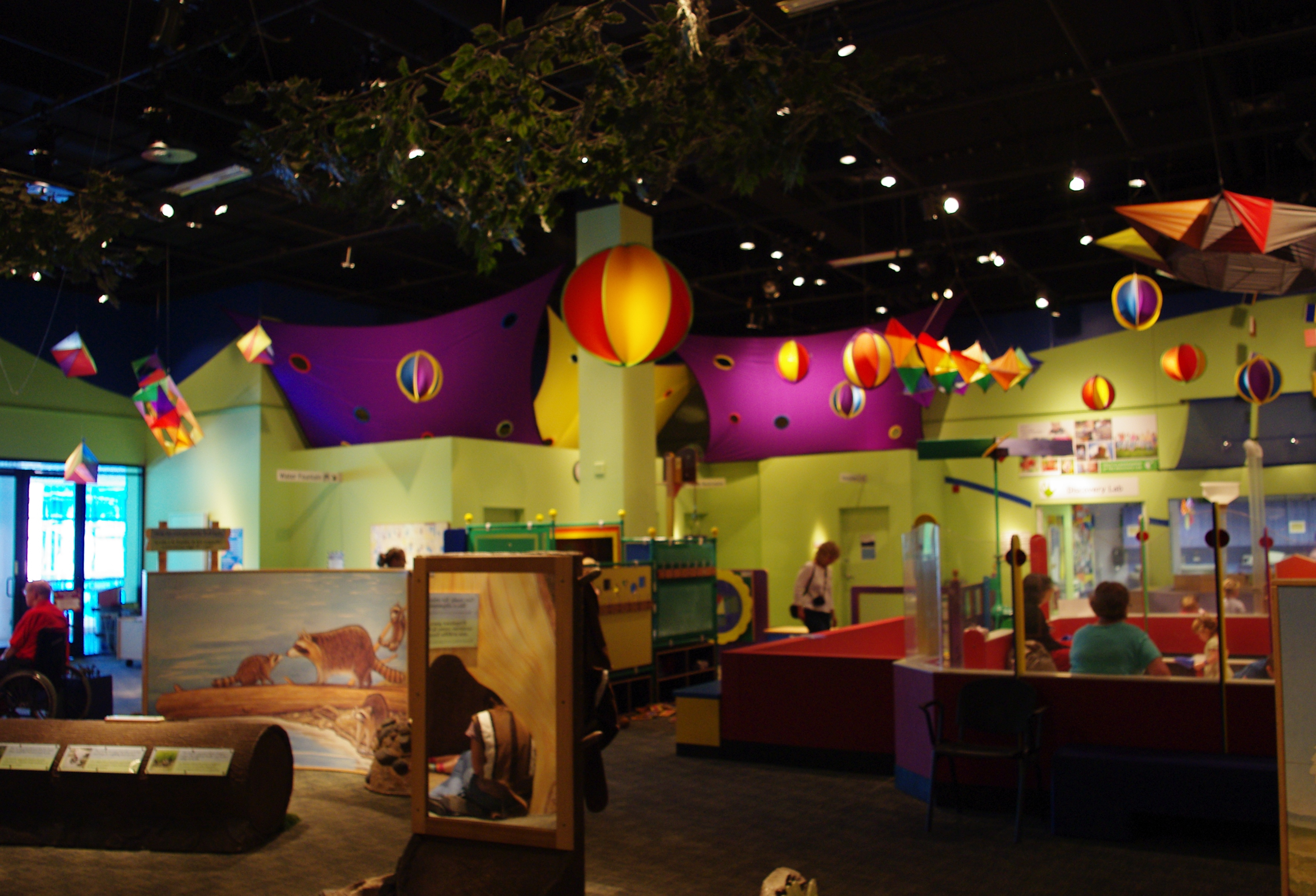
The Science Playground on the second level in 2010

The Science Playground, in the early childhood education area on the second floor of the museum, is designed for families with newborn to six-year-old children. The area is fully enclosed and designed to keep children visible and secure, while giving them freedom to explore at will. Its purpose is to give children the opportunity to develop interactive scientific learning through play. It contains a variety of experimental stations intended to encourage natural curiosity including a stimulating infant area, a giant sandbox, a water area, a reading area, and physical science exhibits. The area is staffed by trained specialists in early childhood education. There is also a Parent Resource Corner with reference materials on topics ranging from the developing brain to behavior intervention techniques.

The Animal Secrets exhibit encourages children and parents to explore the hidden habitats and lives of forest animals. Visitors can crawl through the roots of a discovery tree, look for animals in a cave and a chipmunk den, play in a woodland stream, and be a naturalist for a day. Animal Secrets features English and Spanish text panels.

The Discovery Laboratory offers rotating experiments and activities such as exploring Flubber or ice cube painting. Themed Discovery Drawers encourage parents to teach their own children about the contents. OMSI is a member of Nanoscale Informal Science Education Network, and participates in NanoDays.

=== Planetarium ===
Computer-aided astronomy and laser light shows are performed daily in the Harry C. Kendall Planetarium (previously the M. J. Murdock Sky Theater).

=== Best Buy Teen Tech Center ===
On February 1, 2020, the Best Buy Teen Tech Center opened. As a partnership between Best Buy and The Clubhouse Network, the Teen Tech Center is a free, out-of-school space for teens to explore their ideas, develop skills, and express themselves through technology. Available technology includes programming, filmmaking, music production, and graphic design.

=== Theory Eatery ===
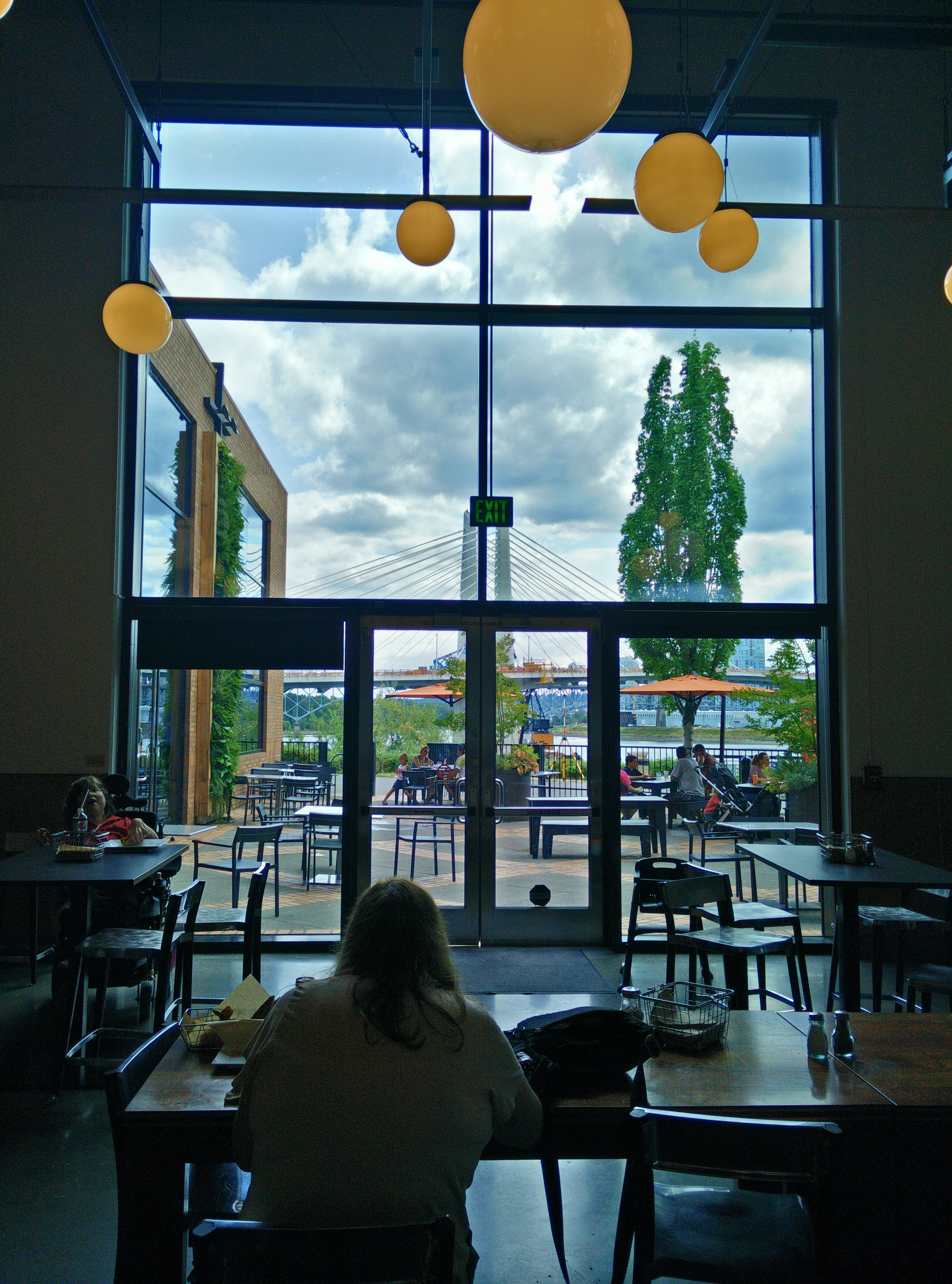
View of the Tilikum Crossing from inside the Theory Eatery, 2014

Theory Eatery, or simply Theory, is an American cuisine restaurant opened on January 30, 2013, as an addition to OMSI. Located alongside the Willamette River in the Central Eastside Industrial District, the restaurant has 9,100 square feet (850 m^{2}) of dining space. Mark Patel, former developer director of OMSI, was behind the creation of the restaurant, which is operated by Bon Appétit Management Company. The restaurant is part of the museum, also offering exhibits, science demonstrations, and public and private events. The former head chef was Ryan Morgan. In 2023, Theory reopened under Epicurean Group management.

Theory is located off of the Willamette River, with views of the Tilikum Crossing, Marquam Bridge, and the downtown Portland skyline. In November 2013, the restaurant was redesigned, and included a new 10 ft × 50 ft (3 m × 15 m) mural of photographed ingredients arranged with formulas in the background, designed by OMSI graphic artist Melissa Hicks.

== Auditoriums ==
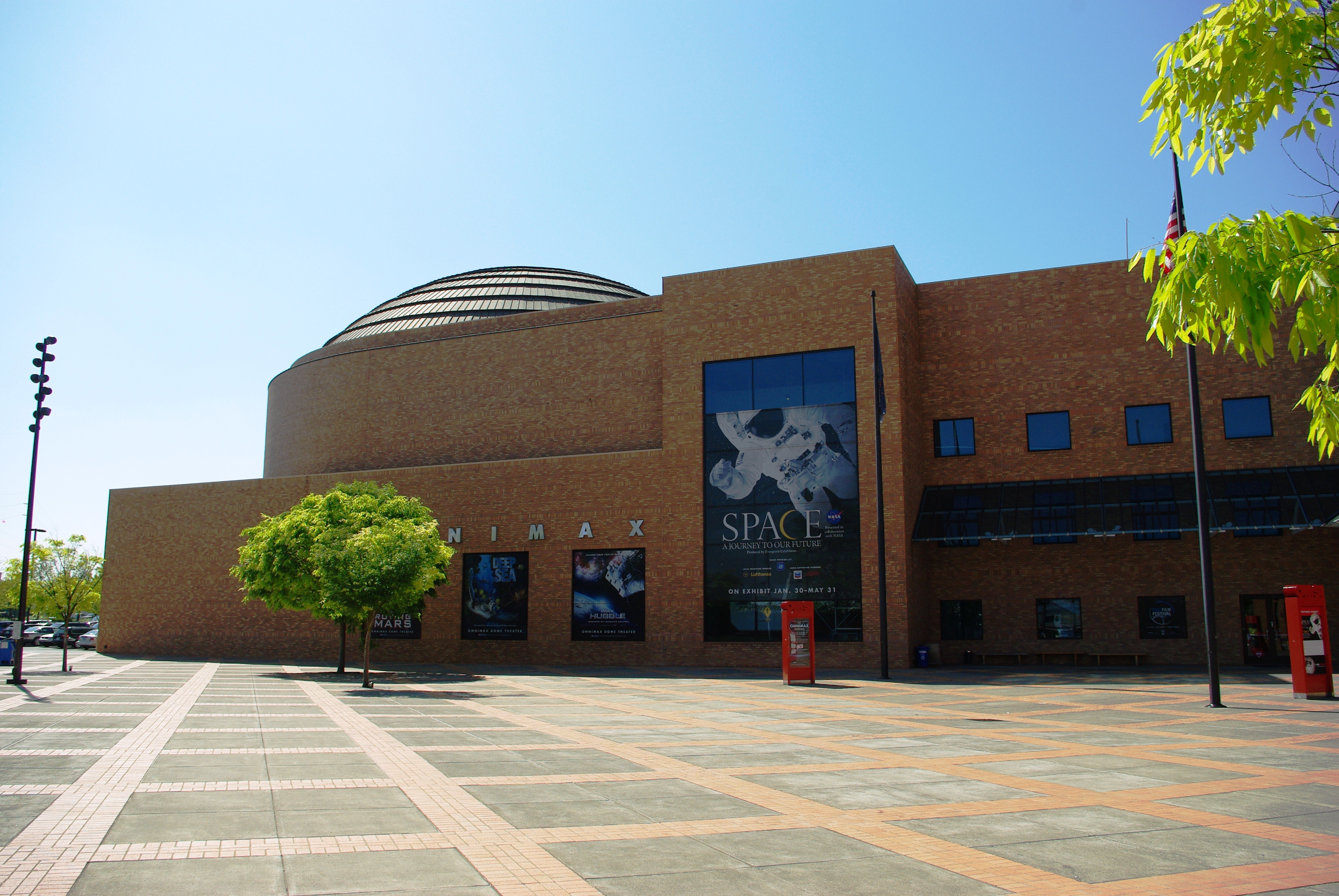
Exterior of the former OMNIMAX theater, which closed in 2013 for conversion to a flat-screen theater

OMSI contains both an ultra-large-screen theater (which replaced an OMNIMAX theater in 2013) and a large auditorium with a stage where annual events such as science fairs occur. Science fairs that take place in the main auditorium include OHSU's Brain Awareness, Safety Safari, and the Reptile and Amphibian Show. The auditorium is also used for private events.

== Educational outreach ==
OMSI operates the largest science museum outreach program in the country. The museum offers presentations in schools, summer science camp programs for individuals, and outdoor school programs for school groups on the Oregon Coast at Camp Gray and in the John Day Fossil Beds National Monument at Hancock Field Station. OMSI is a frequent site for field trips, primarily for grades K-12, from all over the region. OMSI also runs several educational star parties in the Portland area at L.L. "Stub" Stewart State Park and Rooster Rock State Park for events such as the solstice and meteor showers, which helps teach the public about astronomy during this outreach.

OMSI offers Science Communication Fellowships for current STEM professionals. This program is open to industry or academic researchers or science professionals interested in improving their scientific communication, which includes university faculty, graduate students, technicians, or other individuals in science-, engineering-, health-, or technology-related positions. Fellows who are chosen participate in a series of communication training workshops and develop their own hands-on demonstration based on their work. Lastly, fellows participate in OMSI's Meet a Scientist program to engage with the museum visitors with their demonstration.

== Funding and volunteer support ==
OMSI is a non-profit organization and is funded by admissions, member contributions, public and private donations, community agencies, federal grants, and fundraising events. The largest OMSI fundraising event each year is the OMSI Gala, a black-tie party in May where visitors gather to show support for science education.

Although it is staffed with full- and part-time employees, much of the museum is dependent on volunteers who perform many of the same duties as staff members such as greeting visitors, customer service, and performing exhibit demonstrations. The volunteers include high school and college students as well as other community members. Volunteers serve in a wide range of areas within the museum, both onstage and off. After 50 hours of service, all volunteers receive a free one-year museum membership.

The Teen Science Alliance, OMSI's youth volunteer program, takes place both during the summer and during the school year. As a part of the program, participants attend weekly classes focusing on developing communication and customer service skills and practice these skills by performing demonstrations on the museum floor. Participants also develop an original science demonstration for presentation to the public at the end of each session.

== See also ==
- California Museum of Science and Industry, Los Angeles
- Culture of Portland, Oregon
- Museum of Science and Industry (Chicago)
- Museum of Science & Industry (Tampa), Florida
- Portland Festival of Cinema, Animation & Technology
- Portland Winter Light Festival
