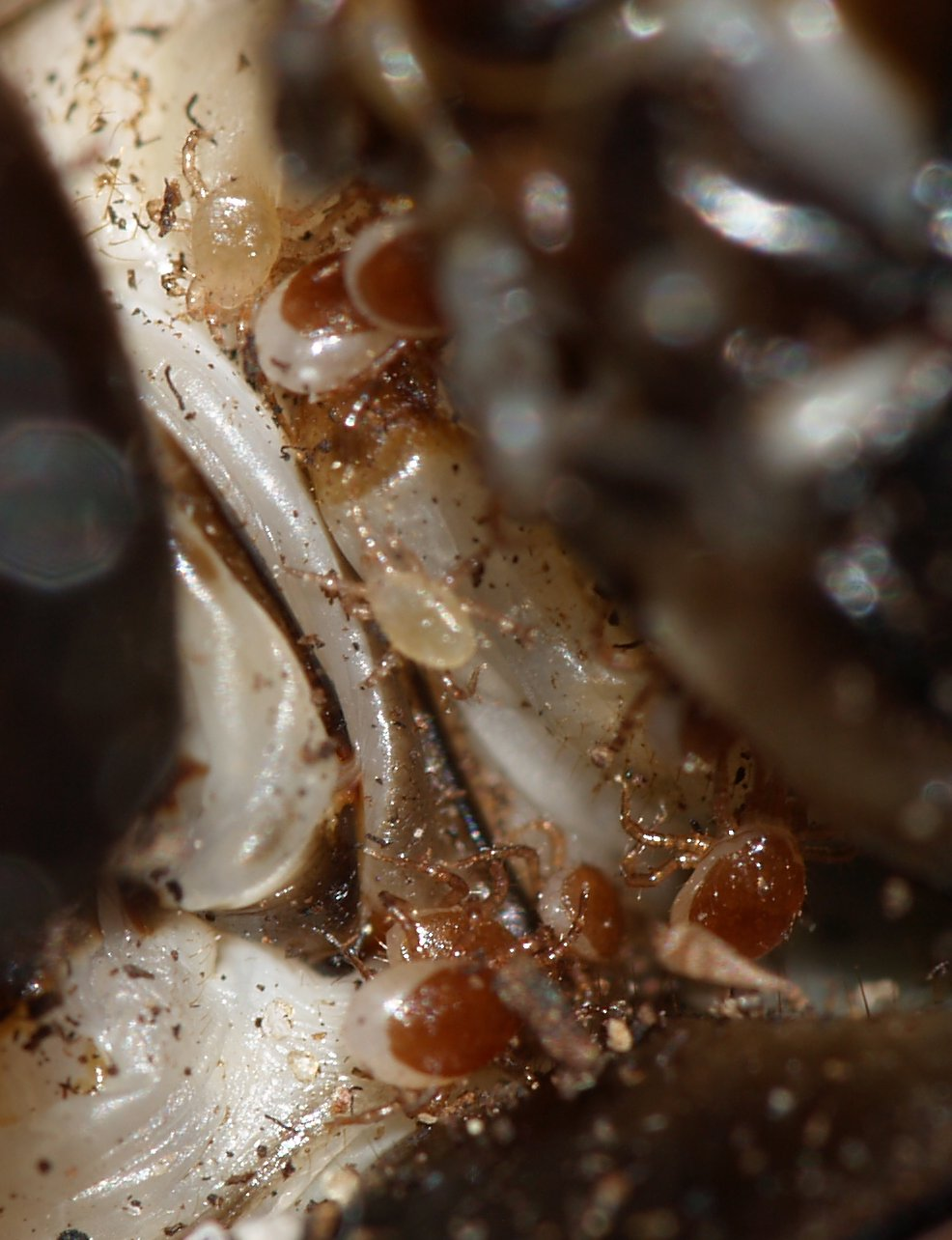
- Adults and juveniles

Scientific classification
- Domain: Eukaryota
- Kingdom: Animalia
- Phylum: Arthropoda
- Subphylum: Chelicerata
- Class: Arachnida
- Order: Mesostigmata
- Family: Laelapidae
- Genus: Androlaelaps
- Species: A. schaeferi

Binomial name
- Androlaelaps schaeferi (Till, 1969)

Synonyms
- Gromphadorholaelaps schaeferi

= Androlaelaps schaeferi =

Species of mite

Androlaelaps schaeferi (formerly known as Gromphadorholaelaps schaeferi) is a mite that lives on the Madagascar hissing cockroach (Gromphadorhina portentosa). While it was formerly believed that it sucks body fluid from its host, coloring experiments have shown that this is false. Instead, it takes part in its host's meal. They are usually concentrated between the host's legs and around the spiracles.
