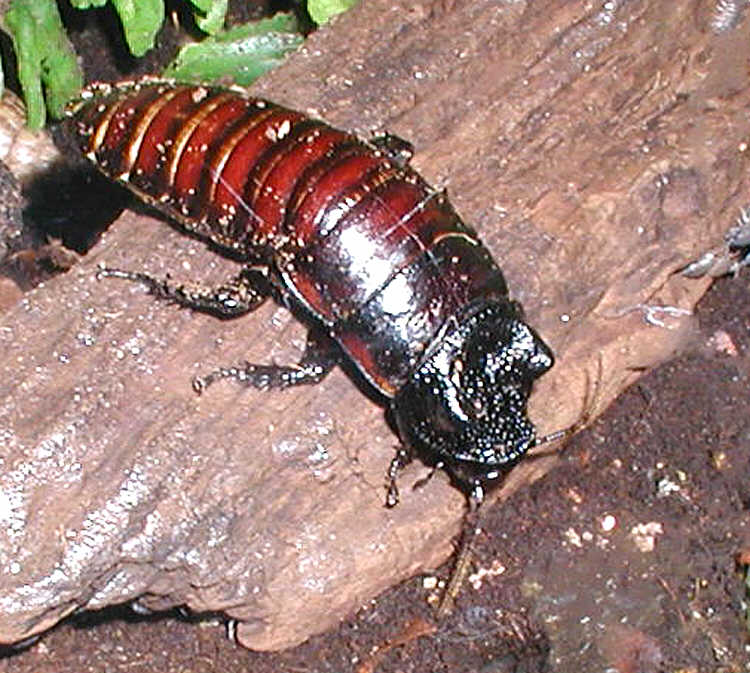

Scientific classification
- Kingdom: Animalia
- Phylum: Arthropoda
- Clade: Pancrustacea
- Class: Insecta
- Order: Blattodea
- Family: Blaberidae
- Genus: Gromphadorhina
- Species: G. oblongonota

Binomial name
- Gromphadorhina oblongonota van Herrewege, 1973

= Gromphadorhina oblongonota =

Species of cockroach

Gromphadorhina oblongonota (often misspelled oblongata or oblongonata), the wide-horned hisser, is a large, flightless species of hissing cockroach from southern Madagascar, and one of four members of the genus Gromphadorhina. This species is common in the pet trade, but it is difficult to distinguish from G. portentosa and is commonly confused with it, although oblongonota tends to be significantly larger and somewhat darker than portentosa.

== As pets ==
All four known Gromphadorhina species are widely kept as exotic pets, with G. portentosa being arguably the most common. Many pet dealers, unaware of the fact that there are four species in the genus, classify their stock as portentosa, even though they are selling oblongonota, mixtures of portentosa and oblongonota, or hybrids of these two species.
