= Portland Festival of Cinema, Animation & Technology =

Annual festival in Portland, Oregon, U.S.

- Logo
- Frequency: Annually
- Venue: Oregon Museum of Science and Industry
- Location: Portland, Oregon
- Country: United States
- Website: pdxfestofcinema.com

The Portland Festival of Cinema, Animation & Technology (PFCAT), formerly the International Festival of Cinema & Technology, is an annual festival in Portland, Oregon, United States. Previously a touring production, the festival has been held in Portland since 2022. It focuses on animation and film, with activities such as screenings, panels and presentations, as well as networking events. PFCAT takes place at the Oregon Museum of Science and Industry (OMSI).

The 2023 festival had 119 films from 22 countries; 110 of the screenings were world or regional premieres. Bill Plympton also appeared at the event. The 2025 event had 150 films and animations from 30 countries.

== See also ==
- Culture of Portland, Oregon
- List of film festivals in the United States
