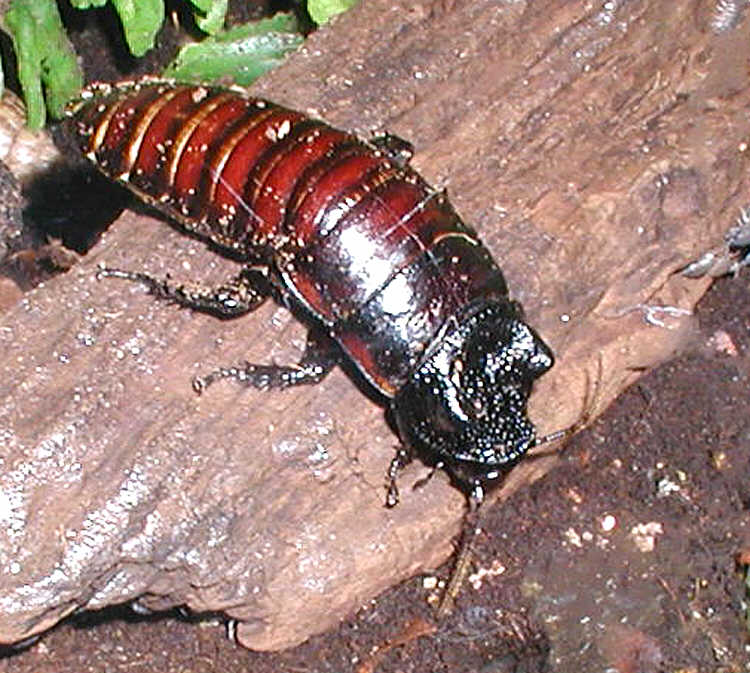
- Gromphadorhina oblongonota

Scientific classification
- Kingdom: Animalia
- Phylum: Arthropoda
- Clade: Pancrustacea
- Class: Insecta
- Order: Blattodea
- Family: Blaberidae
- Subfamily: Oxyhaloinae
- Tribe: Gromphadorhini

Genera
- Aeluropoda; Ateloblatta; Elliptorhina; Gromphadorhina; Leozehntnera; Princisia

= Gromphadorhini =

Tribe of cockroaches

Gromphadorhini, the hissing cockroaches, is a tribe of large, flightless cockroaches comprising 20 known species in six genera. All but one are from the island of Madagascar, where they inhabit wood, leaf litter or rocky crevices in forest or woodland; the one exception, Elliptorhina lefeuvri, being from Europa Island off the coast of Madagascar. Many of the species are popular in the pet trade.

Their common name, hissing cockroaches, refers to them being capable of producing sound by forcing air through their abdominal spiracles. Species in this tribe typically range from about 3.5 to 10 cm (1.5–4 in) in length, and the largest, Gromphadorhina and Princisia, are some of the world's largest cockroaches. Despite their size, nine of the twenty known species of hissing roaches were not recognized until their scientific descriptions in 1973.

== As pets ==
Members of at least four of the genera (Aeluropoda, Elliptorhina, Gromphadorhina, and Princisia) are regularly kept as exotic pets. Although G. portentosa is considered the best known, and most popular pet, this is debatable since G. oblongonota and G. picea (along with hybrids) are commonly confused with it by pet dealers.
