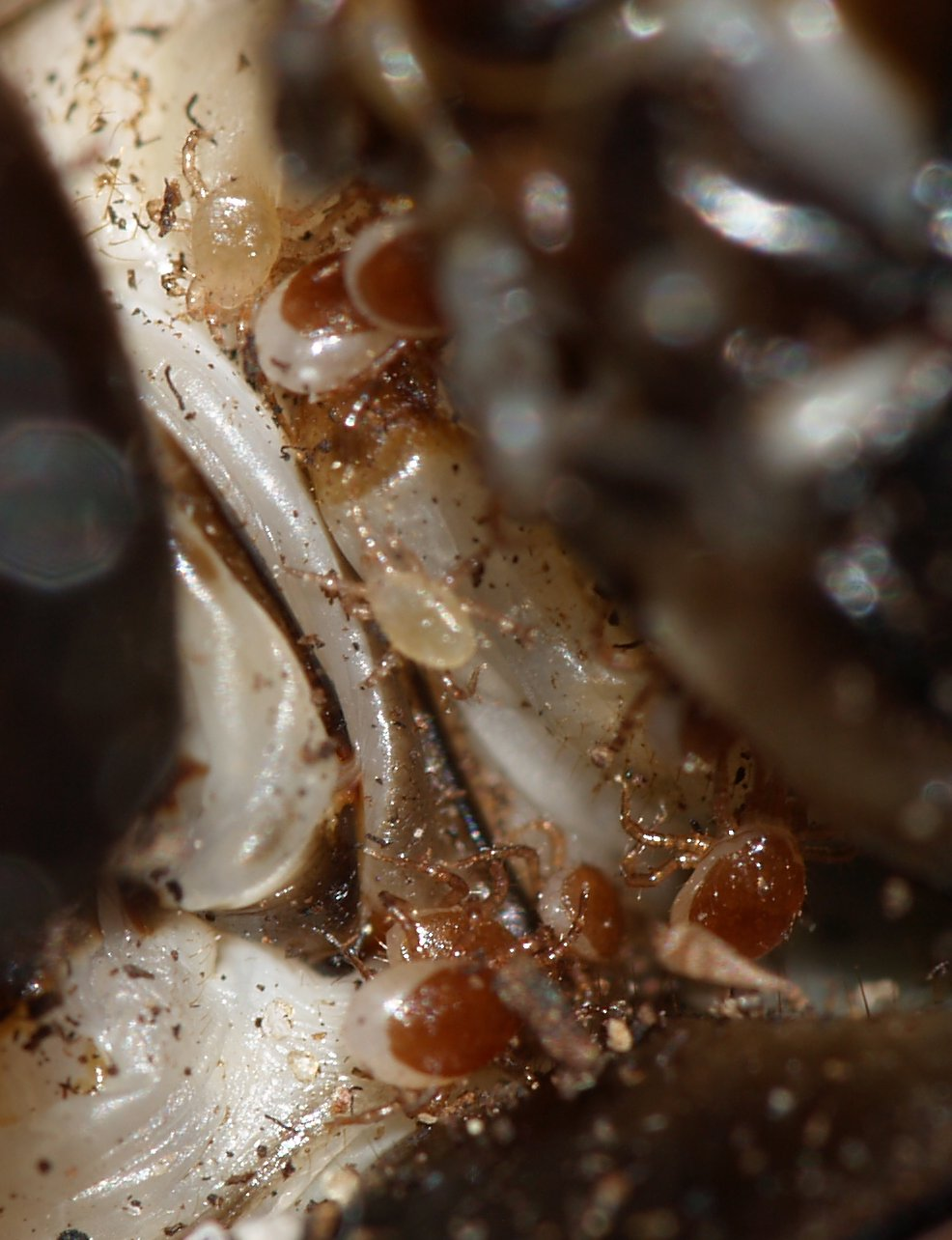
- Androlaelaps schaeferi

Scientific classification
- Domain: Eukaryota
- Kingdom: Animalia
- Phylum: Arthropoda
- Subphylum: Chelicerata
- Class: Arachnida
- Order: Mesostigmata
- Family: Laelapidae
- Genus: Androlaelaps; Berlese, 1903

= Androlaelaps =

Genus of mites

Androlaelaps is a genus of mites in the family Laelapidae.

== Species ==
- Androlaelaps alexandrini (Fox, 1946)
- Androlaelaps setosus (Fox, 1946)
- Androlaelaps angustotactus Karg, 1994
- Androlaelaps anomalis (Wang, Liao & Lin, 1981)
- Androlaelaps anourosorecis (Gu & Wang, 1981)
- Androlaelaps anticlea (Domrow, 1972)
- Androlaelaps bayoumi Basha & Yousef, 2001
- Androlaelaps bellasoma (Sakamoto, Jorgensen & Herrin, 1979)
- Androlaelaps benedictae Fain & Hart, 1988
- Androlaelaps bidens (Domrow, 1980)
- Androlaelaps boleensis (Ye & Ma, 1996)
- Androlaelaps brevicaudae Karg, 1990
- Androlaelaps brevitrematicus Karg, 1990
- Androlaelaps calypso (Domrow, 1966)
- Androlaelaps capillatus Karg, 1993
- Androlaelaps capromydis de-la-Cruz, 1981
- Androlaelaps casalis (Berlese, 1887)
- Androlaelaps casaloides Karg, 1993
- Androlaelaps caurinus (Sakamoto, Jorgensen & Herrin, 1979)
- Androlaelaps cehengensis (Gu, 1983)
- Androlaelaps chaetospinicus (Sakamoto, Jorgensen & Herrin, 1979)
- Androlaelaps chersonesi (Domrow, 1980)
- Androlaelaps circularis (Ewing, 1933)
- Androlaelaps cleptusa (Domrow, 1972)
- Androlaelaps concurrens Berlese, 1918
- Androlaelaps crocidura (Sakamoto, Jorgensen & Herrin, 1979)
- Androlaelaps crowei (Jameson, 1947)
- Androlaelaps cryptomius Radford, 1939
- Androlaelaps cubicularis (Berlese, 1887)
- Androlaelaps cuicensis Gettinger, 1997
- Androlaelaps debilis (Jameson, 1950)
- Androlaelaps deomys Fain & Hart, 1988
- Androlaelaps desmodilliscus (Sakamoto, Jorgensen & Herrin, 1979)
- Androlaelaps domesticus (Berlese, 1887)
- Androlaelaps domrowi (Womersley, 1958)
- Androlaelaps ebsi (Sakamoto, Jorgensen & Herrin, 1979)
- Androlaelaps elongatus Berlese, 1918
- Androlaelaps euryplatamus Yang & Li, 1992
- Androlaelaps extremitatis Karg, 1991
- Androlaelaps extremus Karg, 1990
- Androlaelaps fahrenholzi (Berlese, 1911)
- Androlaelaps flagellatus (Womersley, 1958)
- Androlaelaps foenalis (Berlese, 1887)
- Androlaelaps fragilis (Chen, Bai & Gu, 1995)
- Androlaelaps hattenae (Domrow, 1963)
- Androlaelaps hermaphrodita (Berlese, 1887)
- Androlaelaps hollisteri (Ewing, 1925)
- Androlaelaps ilhacardosoi Gettinger & Martins-Hatano, 2003
- Androlaelaps jamesoni (Furman, 1955)
- Androlaelaps kathuensis Jordaan, 1988
- Androlaelaps kivuensis Fain & Hart, 1988
- Androlaelaps laertes (Domrow, 1972)
- Androlaelaps latiporus (Bai & Gu, 1993)
- Androlaelaps lehfini Oyoun & El-Kady, 1995
- Androlaelaps longoventris Karg, 1978
- Androlaelaps machadoi (Till, 1972)
- Androlaelaps machaeratus (Domrow, 1957)
- Androlaelaps malachela (Sakamoto, Jorgensen & Herrin, 1979)
- Androlaelaps marmosops Martins-Hatano, Gettinger & Bergallo, 2001
- Androlaelaps marsupialis (Berlese, 1910)
- Androlaelaps marsupialis Berlese, 1910
- Androlaelaps martini (Jameson, 1951)
- Androlaelaps minutiventralis (Gu, 1983)
- Androlaelaps novemspinosus Li, Yang & Zhang, 1998
- Androlaelaps orientalis Ibrahim & Abdel-Samad, 1990
- Androlaelaps pachyptilae (Zumpt & Till, 1956)
- Androlaelaps palaniae (Domrow, 1981)
- Androlaelaps paracasalis (Ryke, 1963)
- Androlaelaps parahirsti (Sakamoto, Jorgensen & Herrin, 1979)
- Androlaelaps parasingularis Gu & Wang, 1996
- Androlaelaps paraxeri Fain & Hart, 1988
- Androlaelaps penelope (Domrow, 1964)
- Androlaelaps petauristae (Gu & Wang, 1980)
- Androlaelaps pilosus Baker, 1991
- Androlaelaps praeporus (Gu & Wang, 1981)
- Androlaelaps pulchriventris Karg, 1978
- Androlaelaps pumilionis Karg, 1993
- Androlaelaps qinghaiensis (Yang & Gu, 1985)
- Androlaelaps quartus (Domrow, 1961)
- Androlaelaps rahmi Fain & Hart, 1988
- Androlaelaps rohaniae (Domrow, 1980)
- Androlaelaps sanduensis (Gu & Wang, 1981)
- Androlaelaps schaeferi (Till, 1969)
- Androlaelaps sciuricola Fain & Hart, 1988
- Androlaelaps sclerotarsus (Gu & Bai, 1995)
- Androlaelaps sikapusi (Sakamoto, Jorgensen & Herrin, 1979)
- Androlaelaps singularis Wang & Li, 1965
- Androlaelaps singuloides Gu & Duan, 1991
- Androlaelaps sisyphus (Domrow, 1981)
- Androlaelaps spinosus (Furman, 1955)
- Androlaelaps subpavlovskii Liu, Ma & Ding, 2000
- Androlaelaps subterraneus (Berlese, 1920)
- Androlaelaps taterakempi (Sakamoto, Jorgensen & Herrin, 1979)
- Androlaelaps telemachus (Domrow, 1964)
- Androlaelaps trifurcatoides Yan & Ma, 1999
- Androlaelaps ulixes (Domrow, 1972)
- Androlaelaps ulysses (Domrow, 1961)
- Androlaelaps verneri Dusbabek, Daniel & Till, 1982
- Androlaelaps yiliensis (Ye & Ma, 1996)
- Androlaelaps zhongweiensis (Bai, Chen & Wang, 1987)
- Androlaelaps ziegleri Karg, 1991
