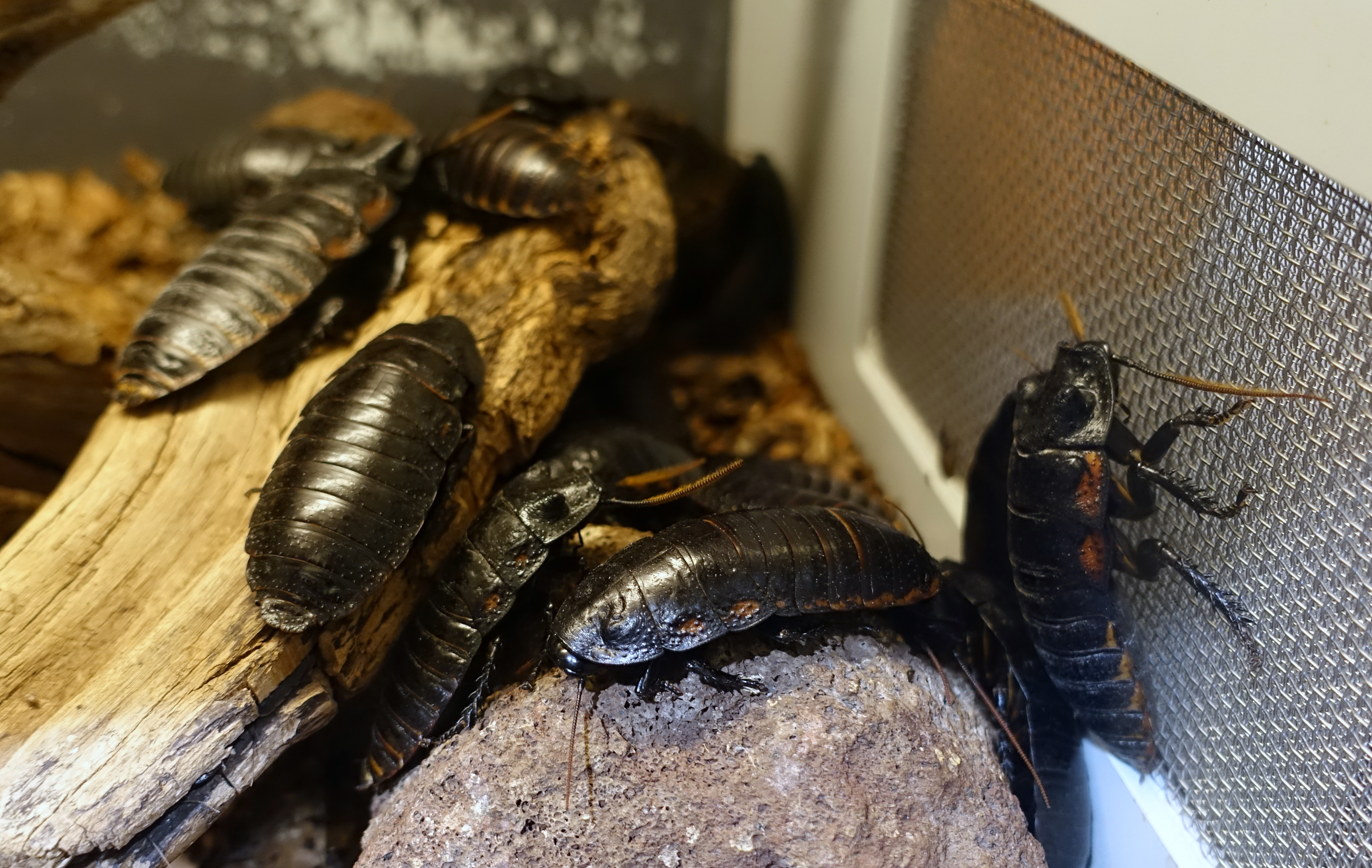

Scientific classification
- Domain: Eukaryota
- Kingdom: Animalia
- Phylum: Arthropoda
- Class: Insecta
- Order: Blattodea
- Family: Blaberidae
- Subfamily: Oxyhaloinae
- Tribe: Gromphadorhini
- Genus: Princisia van Herrewege, 1973
- Species: P. vanwaerebeki

Binomial name
- Princisia vanwaerebeki van Herrewege, 1973

= Princisia =

Species of large cockroach

Princisia vanwaerebeki, commonly known as the vibrant hisser, is a large, flightless species of hissing cockroach in the family Blaberidae, and the only member of the genus Princisia. It is endemic to southeastern Madagascar, and sometimes seen in the pet trade.

It is named in honour of two people: Karlis Princis for the genus name and Daniel van Waerebek, a helminthologist in Antananarivo, for the specific (species) name. It is a very large species, growing between 5.6 and 10 cm (2.2 and 3.9 in) in length. Larger specimens are usually male. Females usually live up to three years. It is one of several species of cockroach sometimes infected by Blabericola migrator, a parasitic alveolate.
