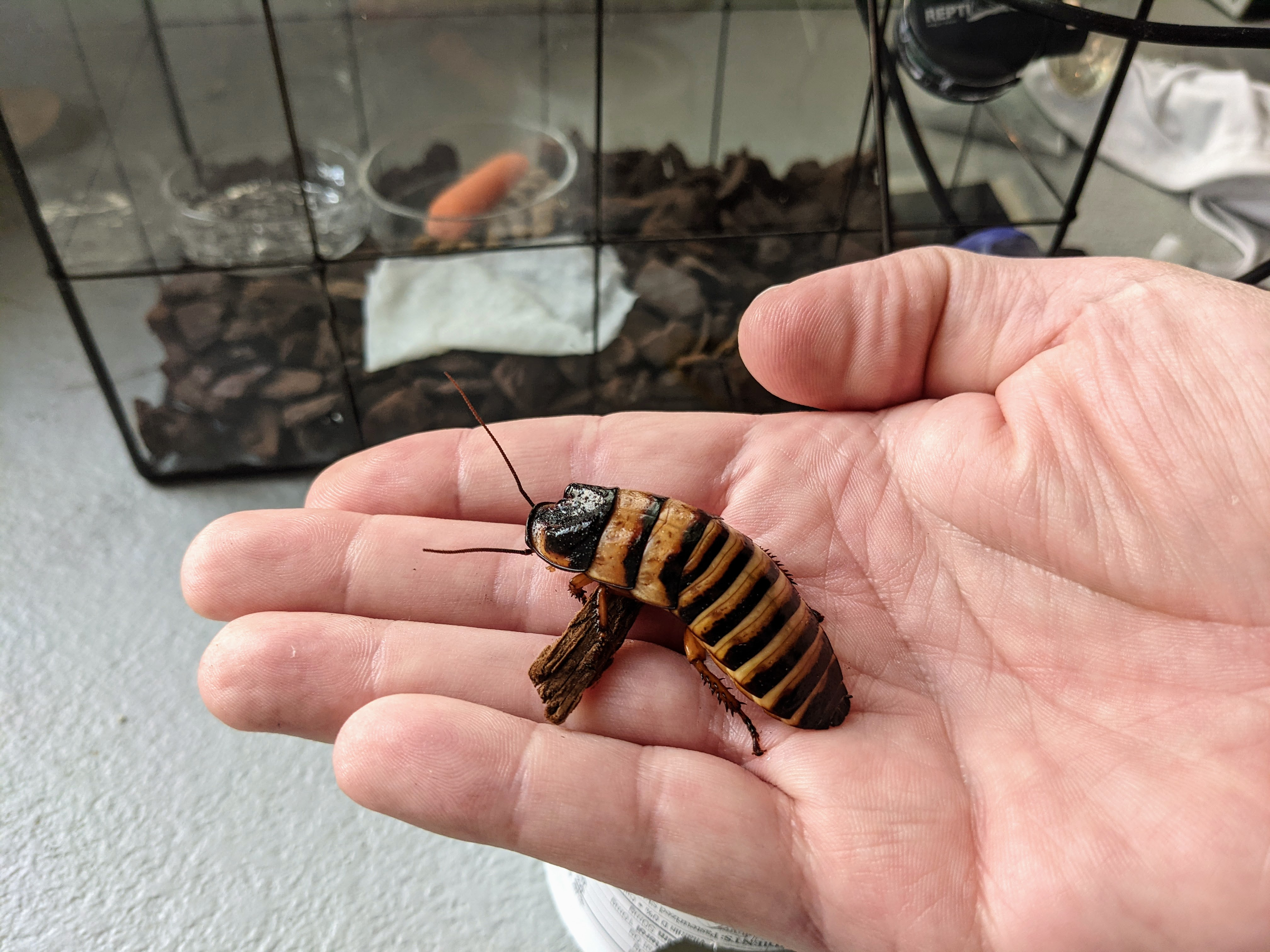
- Elliptorhina javanica

Scientific classification
- Kingdom: Animalia
- Phylum: Arthropoda
- Clade: Pancrustacea
- Class: Insecta
- Order: Blattodea
- Family: Blaberidae
- Subfamily: Oxyhaloinae
- Tribe: Gromphadorhini
- Genus: Elliptorhina van Herrewege, 1973

Species
- Elliptorhina brunneri Elliptorhina chopardi Elliptorhina coquereliana Elliptorhina davidi Elliptorhina javanica Elliptorhina laevigata Elliptorhina lefeuvri Elliptorhina oblonga Elliptorhina problematica Elliptorhina testacea

= Elliptorhina =

Genus of cockroaches

Elliptorhina is a genus of large, flightless cockroaches that are part of the tribe Gromphadorhini (hissing cockroaches). There are ten known species, nine of those found on the island of Madagascar and one, Elliptorhina lefeuvri, found on Europa Island. Some of its species are regularly seen in the pet trade.
