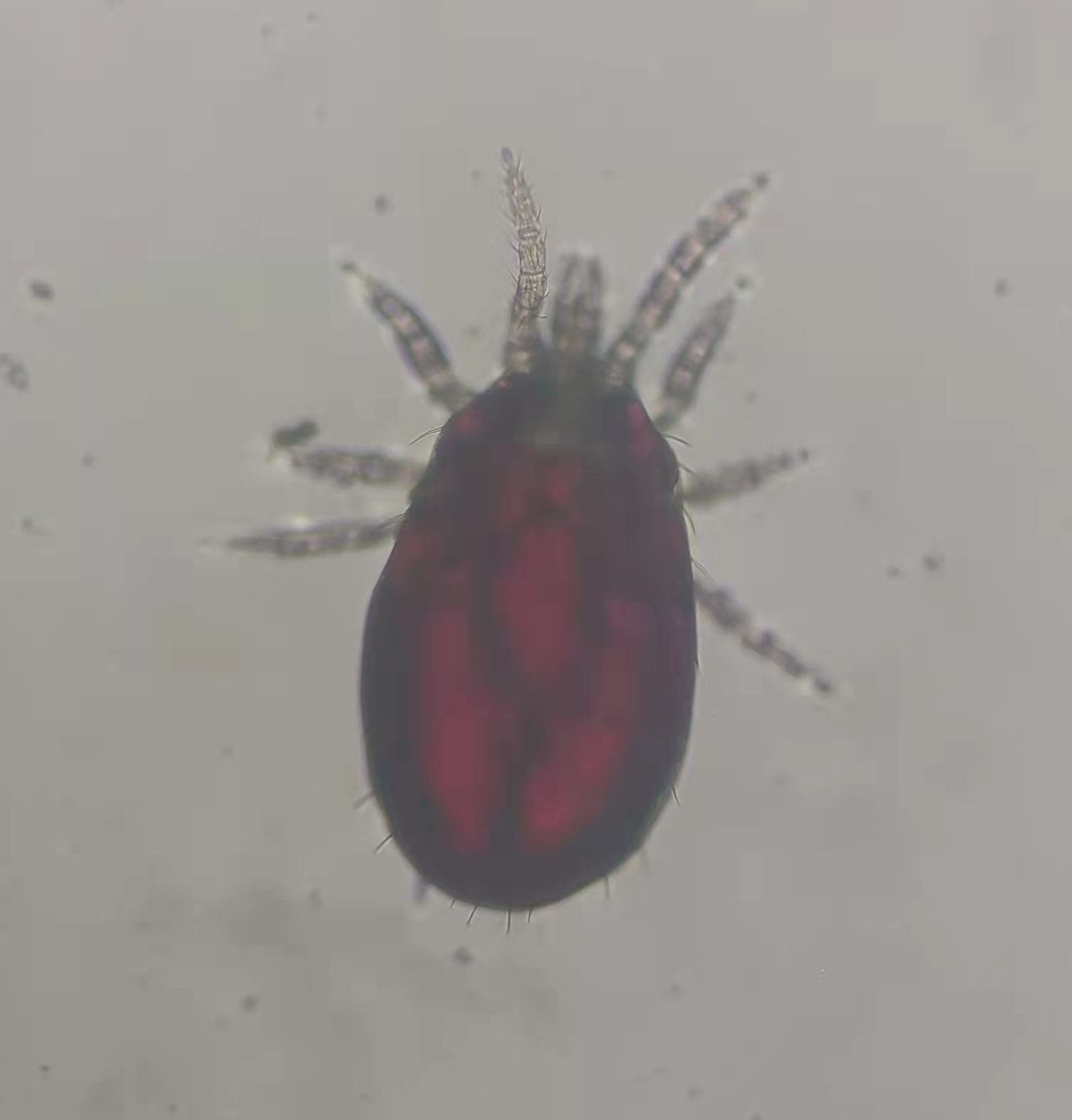

Scientific classification
- Domain: Eukaryota
- Kingdom: Animalia
- Phylum: Arthropoda
- Subphylum: Chelicerata
- Class: Arachnida
- Order: Mesostigmata
- Family: Laelapidae
- Genus: Androlaelaps
- Species: A. fahrenholzi

Binomial name
- Androlaelaps fahrenholzi (Berlese, 1911)

Synonyms
- Atricholaelaps sigmodoni Strandtmann, 1946; Haemolaelaps scalopi Keegan, 1946; Laelaps californicus Ewing, 1925; Laelaps glasgowi Ewing, 1925; Laelaps stegemani Hefley, 1935; Laelaps virginianus Ewing, 1925; Liponyssus setiger Ewing, 1920

= Androlaelaps fahrenholzi =

Species of mite

Androlaelaps fahrenholzi is a species of mite in the genus Androlaelaps of the family Laelapidae. It occurs throughout the contiguous United States, where it has been recorded on the following mammals:

- Arborimus albipes
- Arborimus longicaudus
- Bassariscus astutus
- Blarina brevicauda
- Blarina carolinensis
- Callospermophilus lateralis
- Chaetodipus hispidus
- Condylura cristata
- Corynorhinus townsendii
- Cryptotis parva
- Cynomys ludovicianus
- Didelphis virginiana
- Dipodomys elator
- Dipodomys elephantinus
- Dipodomys ordii
- Dipodomys venustus
- Geomys pinetis
- Glaucomys sabrinus
- Glaucomys volans
- Lemmiscus curtatus
- Marmota monax
- Mephitis mephitis
- Microtus chrotorrhinus
- Ictidomys tridecemlineatus
- Microtus longicaudus
- Microtus montanus
- Microtus ochrogaster
- Microtus oregoni
- Microtus pennsylvanicus
- Microtus pinetorum
- Microtus richardsoni
- Microtus townsendii
- Mus musculus
- Mustela erminea
- Mustela frenata
- Mustela nivalis
- Myodes californicus
- Myodes gapperi
- Napaeozapus insignis
- Neofiber alleni
- Neotamias amoenus
- Neotamias minimus
- Neotoma cinerea
- Neotoma floridana
- Neotoma fuscipes
- Neotoma lepida
- Neotoma magister
- Neotoma micropus
- Neovison vison
- Neurotrichus gibbsii
- Ochrotomys nuttalli
- Ondatra zibethicus
- Onychomys leucogaster
- Otospermophilus beecheyi
- Oryzomys palustris
- Parascalops breweri
- Perognathus fasciatus
- Perognathus parvus
- Peromyscus boylii
- Peromyscus crinitus
- Peromyscus gossypinus
- Peromyscus leucopus
- Peromyscus maniculatus
- Peromyscus truei
- Podomys floridanus
- Poliocitellus franklinii
- Procyon lotor
- Rattus norvegicus
- Reithrodontomys megalotis
- Scalopus aquaticus
- Scapanus latimanus
- Scapanus orarius
- Scapanus townsendii
- Sciurus carolinensis
- Sciurus niger
- Sigmodon hispidus
- Sorex bendirii
- Sorex cinereus
- Sorex fumeus
- Sorex longirostris
- Sorex pacificus
- Sorex palustris
- Sorex trowbridgii
- Sorex vagrans
- Spilogale putorius
- Sylvilagus floridanus
- Sylvilagus palustris
- Synaptomys borealis
- Synaptomys cooperi
- Tamias striatus
- Tamiasciurus hudsonicus
- Taxidea taxus
- Thomomys talpoides
- Urocitellus beldingi
- Urocitellus brunneus
- Urocitellus richardsonii
- Urocitellus townsendii
- Urocitellus washingtoni
- Urocyon cinereoargenteus
- Xerospermophilus tereticaudus
- Zapus hudsonius
- Zapus princeps
- Zapus trinotatus

== See also ==
- List of parasites of the marsh rice rat

== Literature cited ==
- Whitaker, J.O., Walters, B.L., Castor, L.K., Ritzi, C.M. and Wilson, N. 2007. Host and distribution lists of mites (Acari), parasitic and phoretic, in the hair or on the skin of North American wild mammals north of Mexico: records since 1974. Faculty Publications from the Harold W. Manter Laboratory of Parasitology, University of Nebraska, Lincoln 1:1–173.
