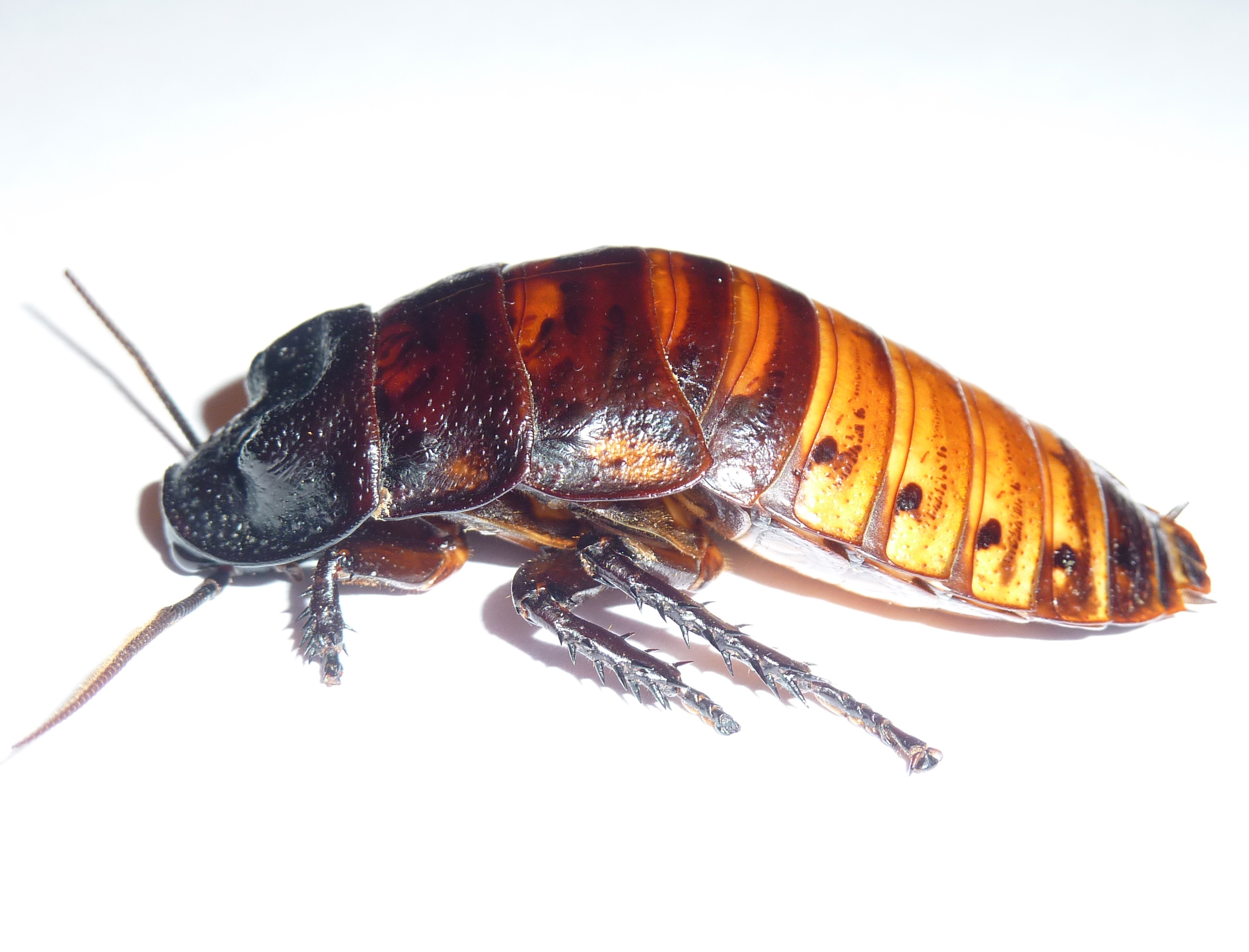
- Gromphadorhina portentosa

Scientific classification
- Kingdom: Animalia
- Phylum: Arthropoda
- Clade: Pancrustacea
- Class: Insecta
- Order: Blattodea
- Family: Blaberidae
- Subfamily: Oxyhaloinae
- Tribe: Gromphadorhini
- Genus: Gromphadorhina; Brunner von Wattenwyl, 1865

Synonyms
- Gromphadorrhina

Audio
- Hissing of Madagascar hissing cockroach

= Gromphadorhina =

Genus of cockroaches

Gromphadorhina is a genus of large, flightless cockroaches from southern Madagascar; they are typical of the tribe Gromphadorhini (hissing cockroaches) and common in the pet trade. In the older literature, the name is sometimes misspelled as Gromphadorrhina.

== Species ==
The Cockroach Species File lists:

1. Gromphadorhina grandidieri Kirby, 1904
2. Gromphadorhina oblongonota van Herrewege, 1973
3. Gromphadorhina picea van Herrewege, 1973
4. Gromphadorhina portentosa (Schaum, 1853) - type species (as Hormetica portentosa Schaum)

== As pets ==
All four Gromphadorhina species are widely kept as exotic pets, where the most well-known species is the Madagascar hissing cockroach, (G. portentosa), though this is debatable as at least two other species in the genus are commonly confused with it; G. oblongonota and G. picea.
