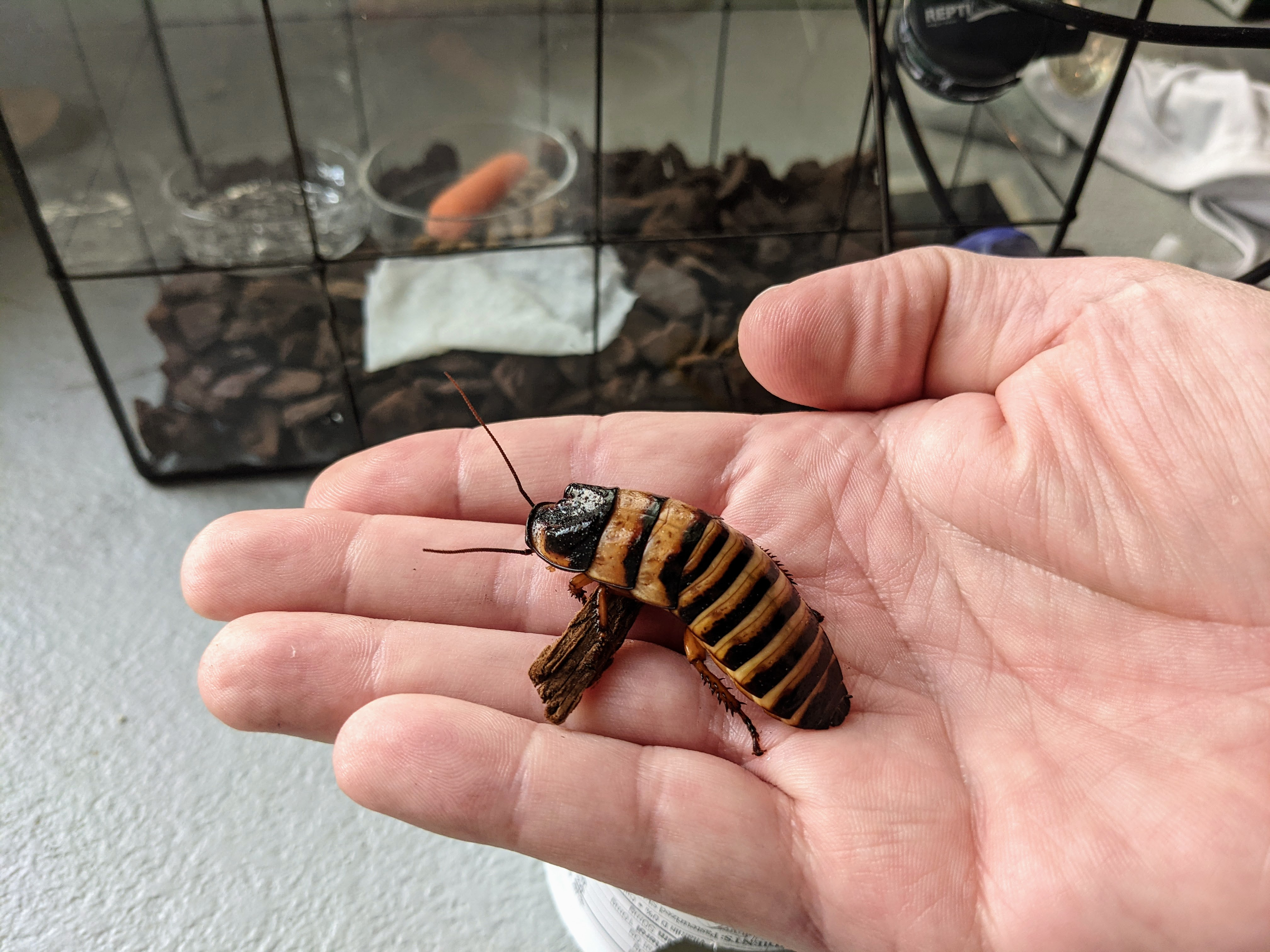

Scientific classification
- Kingdom: Animalia
- Phylum: Arthropoda
- Clade: Pancrustacea
- Class: Insecta
- Order: Blattodea
- Family: Blaberidae
- Genus: Elliptorhina
- Species: E. javanica

Binomial name
- Elliptorhina javanica (Hanitsch, 1930)

Synonyms
- Gromphadorhina javanica Hanitsch, 1930

= Elliptorhina javanica =

Species of cockroach

Elliptorhina javanica, also known as the Halloween hisser, or Halloween Madagascar Hissing Cockroach is a large species of wingless cockroach native to the island of Madagascar.

== Description ==
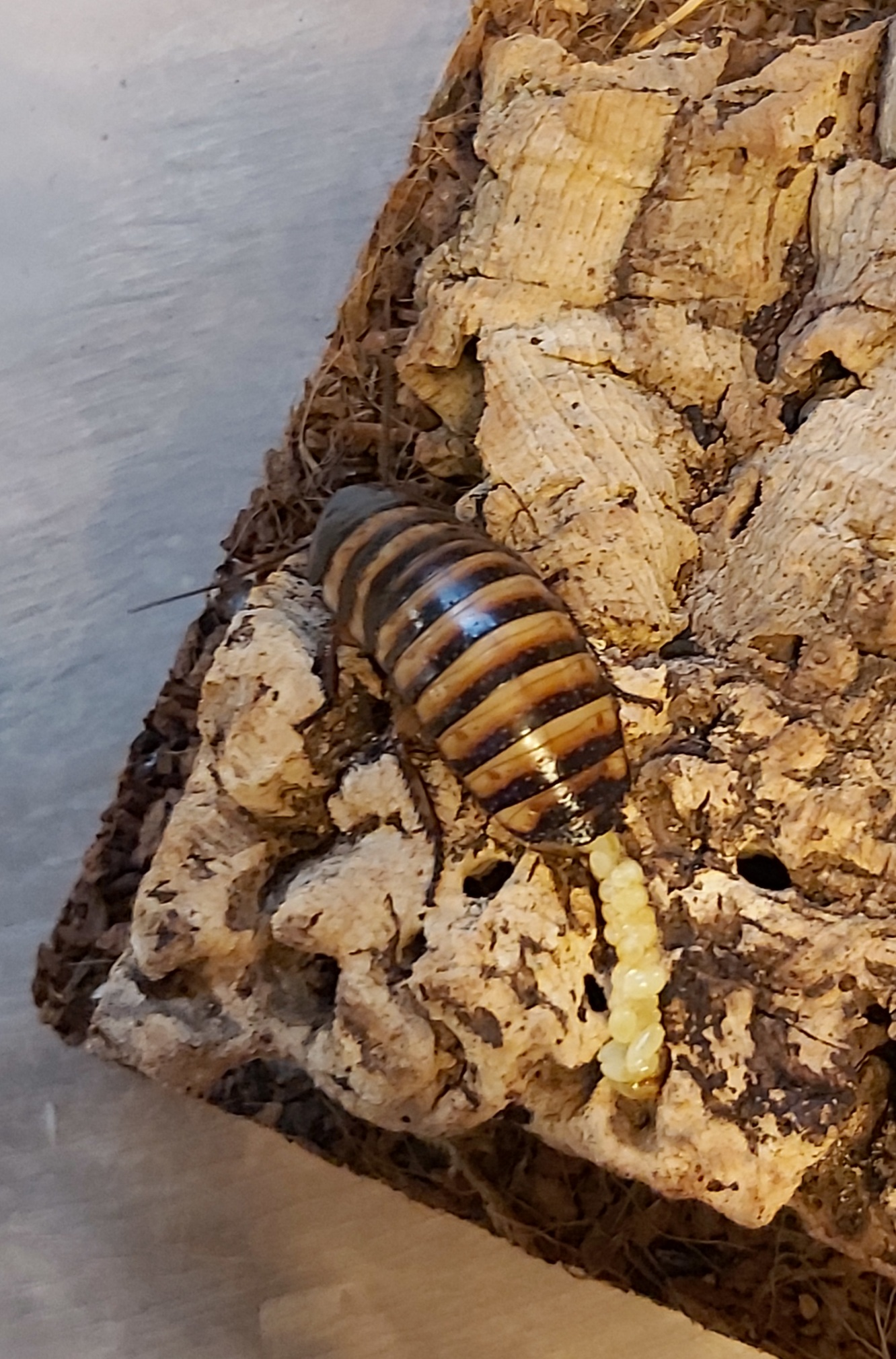
Female with an ootheca

Its common name derives from its black and orange-yellow striped coloration and its hissing sound when disturbed, which is produced when they forcefully expel air through the specially-adapted respiratory openings (spiracles) on the fourth segment of their body. Body length varies around 35–50 mm for females, and 40–50 mm in males.
