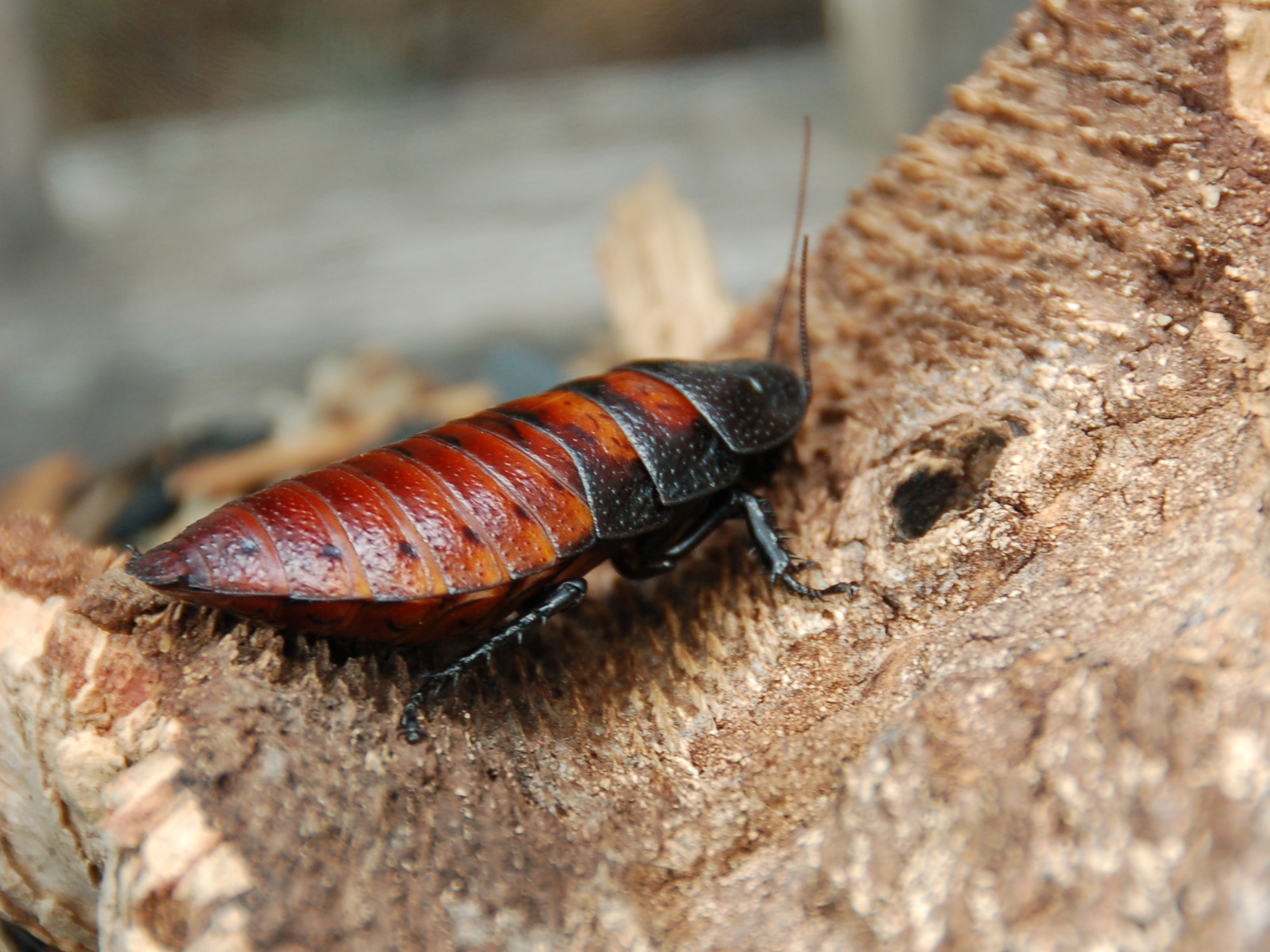
- Female Madagascar hissing cockroach on a piece of wood

Scientific classification
- Kingdom: Animalia
- Phylum: Arthropoda
- Clade: Pancrustacea
- Class: Insecta
- Order: Blattodea
- Family: Blaberidae
- Genus: Gromphadorhina
- Species: G. portentosa

Binomial name
- Gromphadorhina portentosa (Schaum, 1853)

Audio

= Madagascar hissing cockroach =

Species of cockroach

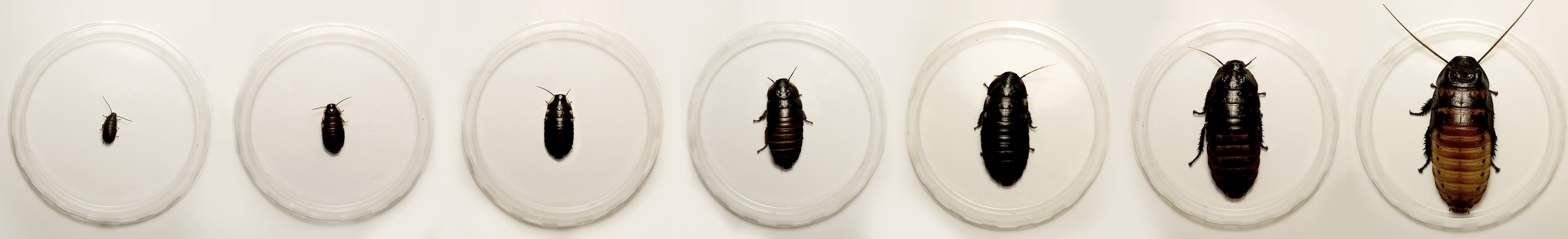
Gromphadorhina portentosa growth stages

The Madagascar hissing cockroach (Gromphadorhina portentosa), also known as the hissing cockroach, Malagasy hissing cockroach or simply hisser, is one of the largest species of cockroach, reaching 5 to 7.5 centimetres (2 to 3 inches) at maturity. They are native to the island of Madagascar, where they are commonly found in rotting logs. It is one of some 20 known species of large hissing roaches from Madagascar, many of which are kept as pets, and often confused with one another by pet dealers; in particular, G. portentosa is commonly confused with G. oblongonota and G. picea.

Unlike most cockroaches, they are wingless. The "hissing" sound (expelling air through their bodies) is their primary defense, to frighten potential predators, as they cannot fly and are easily captured. They are excellent climbers and can scale smooth glass. Males can be distinguished from females by their thicker, hairier antennae and the very pronounced bumps on the pronotum. Females carry the ootheca internally and release the young nymphs only after the offspring have emerged within them (this is known as ovoviviparity). As in some other wood-inhabiting roaches, the parents and offspring will commonly remain in close physical contact for extended periods of time. In captivity, they have been known to live up to 5 years. They feed primarily on vegetable material.

== Taxonomy ==
In 1842, German explorer Wilhelm Peters set off on a voyage to Mozambique, during which he collected many specimens of a wide variety of species. Upon returning to Germany, he deposited many of these specimens in the collection of the Museum für Naturkunde Berlin, where they would later be studied by various biologists. German entomologist Hermann Rudolph Schaum studied some of the insects collected by Peters, and noticed that one of the specimens, a large cockroach found in the Bay of Saint-Augustin, Madagascar, matched no species known to science at the time. Schaum determined that this cockroach must be a new species, and gave it the scientific name Hormetica portentosa. This specimen would later be studied again by Swiss entomologist Carl Brunner von Wattenwyl, who found that it differed significantly enough from other known cockroaches that it should be given its own genus separate from them. He therefore established the genus Gromphadorhina in 1865, renaming the species as Gromphadorhina portentosa and designating it as the type species of this genus.

== Hissing ==
As the common name suggests, the Madagascar hissing cockroach is characterized by its "hissing" sound, which some people claim sounds more like a rattlesnake's tail or a rainstick. This is their primary method of warding off potentially insectivorous predators. The sound is produced as the insect forcefully expels air out of their specialized respiratory spiracles (orifices), mainly those that are located on the insect fourth body segment (abdomen), although spiracles are found, more or less, on all segments of their abdomen. The Madagascar hissing cockroach is the only member of their group of cockroaches that can make audible sounds. Compared to crickets, this exact mode of sound production is atypical, as most insects that make noises do so by rubbing together various body parts ("stridulation"), such as the hind legs. Some long-horned beetles, e.g., the giant Fijian long-horned beetle, hiss by squeezing air out from under their elytra, but this does not involve the spiracles. In hissing cockroaches, the sound takes three forms: the disturbance hiss, the female-attracting hiss, and the aggressive or fighting hiss. All cockroaches from the fourth instar (fourth molting cycle) and older are capable of the disturbance hiss. Only males use the female-attracting hiss and fighting hiss; the latter is used between males to settle territory disputes over breeding rights. The hissing makes them a popular pet; initially, they will make the noises when picked up, though they quickly calm down and adjust to being handled and observed up-close.

== Associations with other animals ==
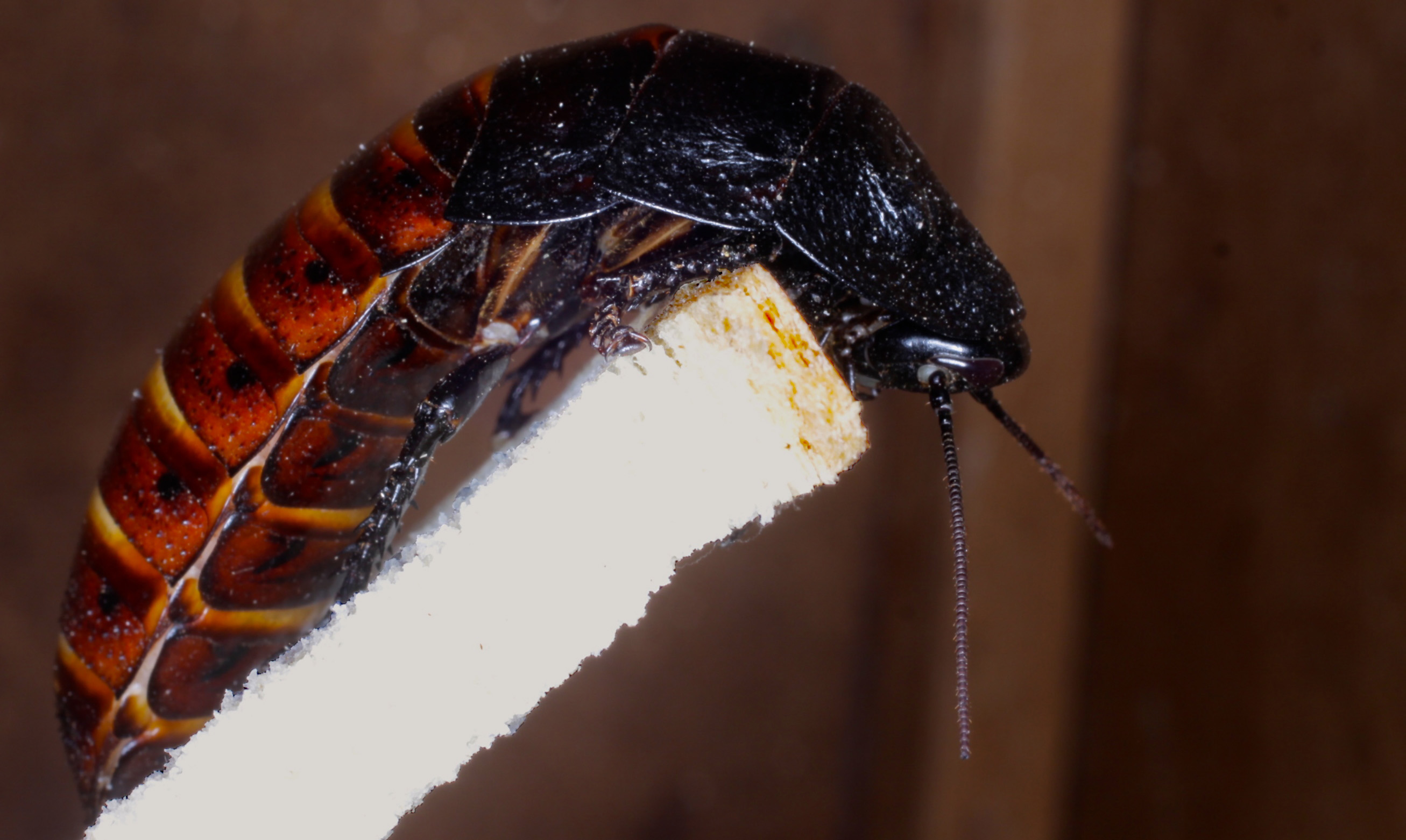
Hissing cockroach

The mite species Androlaelaps schaeferi lives on this species of cockroach along the undersides and bases of the legs and takes some of its host's food as well as consuming particulates along the host's body. As these mites do not harm the cockroaches they live upon, they are commensals, not parasites, unless they build up to abnormal levels and start starving their host. Recent studies have shown that these mites also may have beneficial qualities for the cockroaches, in that they clean the surfaces of the cockroaches of pathogenic mold spores, which in turn increases the life expectancy of the cockroaches.

== Popular culture ==
The Madagascar hissing cockroach has been known to be featured in Hollywood movies, prominently in Bug (1975), as cockroaches who could set fires by rubbing their legs together, and in Damnation Alley (1977) as post-nuclear-war mutant armor-plated "killer" cockroaches. In Starship Troopers, a sci-fi satire film about future humans' war against an alien species called "The Bugs", a teacher is shown encouraging her students to step on this species as part of a TV propaganda broadcast.

In 1984, a guest named Adam Zweig appeared on Late Night with David Letterman, demonstrating his pet Madagascar cockroach "climbing the tightrope over the fires of hell and the pit of doom".

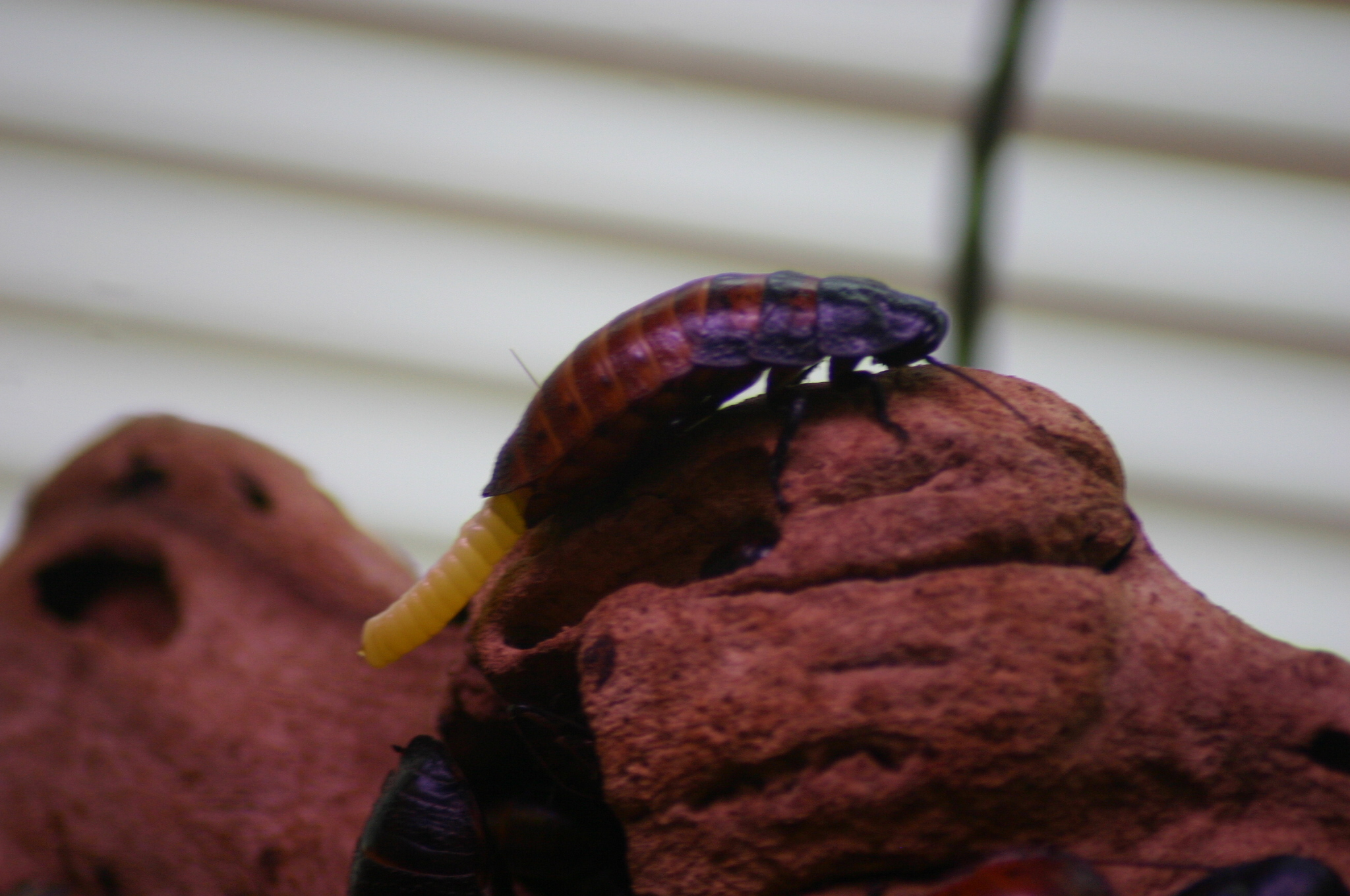
Airing out ootheca

A Madagascar hissing cockroach was used by artist Garnet Hertz as the driver of a mobile robotic artwork.

They were frequently used in the reality television series Fear Factor, where in one episode of the 2002 series, featuring celebrities competing for charity, the host, Joe Rogan, ate one as part of a wager with contestant Alison Sweeney of Days of Our Lives after she had what Rogan has since described as "the greatest freak-out in Fear Factor history" after panicking during a stunt. While normally she would be eliminated, as the show was for charity, it was decided that if she ate three worms she would advance to the final stunt regardless. In addition, Rogan would eat a cockroach as part of the bet.

The species also made an appearance in the movie Men in Black in 1997. This was later parodied in the comedy Team America: World Police (2004), where a cockroach emerges from a Kim Jong-il puppet's body after his death, enters a tiny spaceship, and flies away.

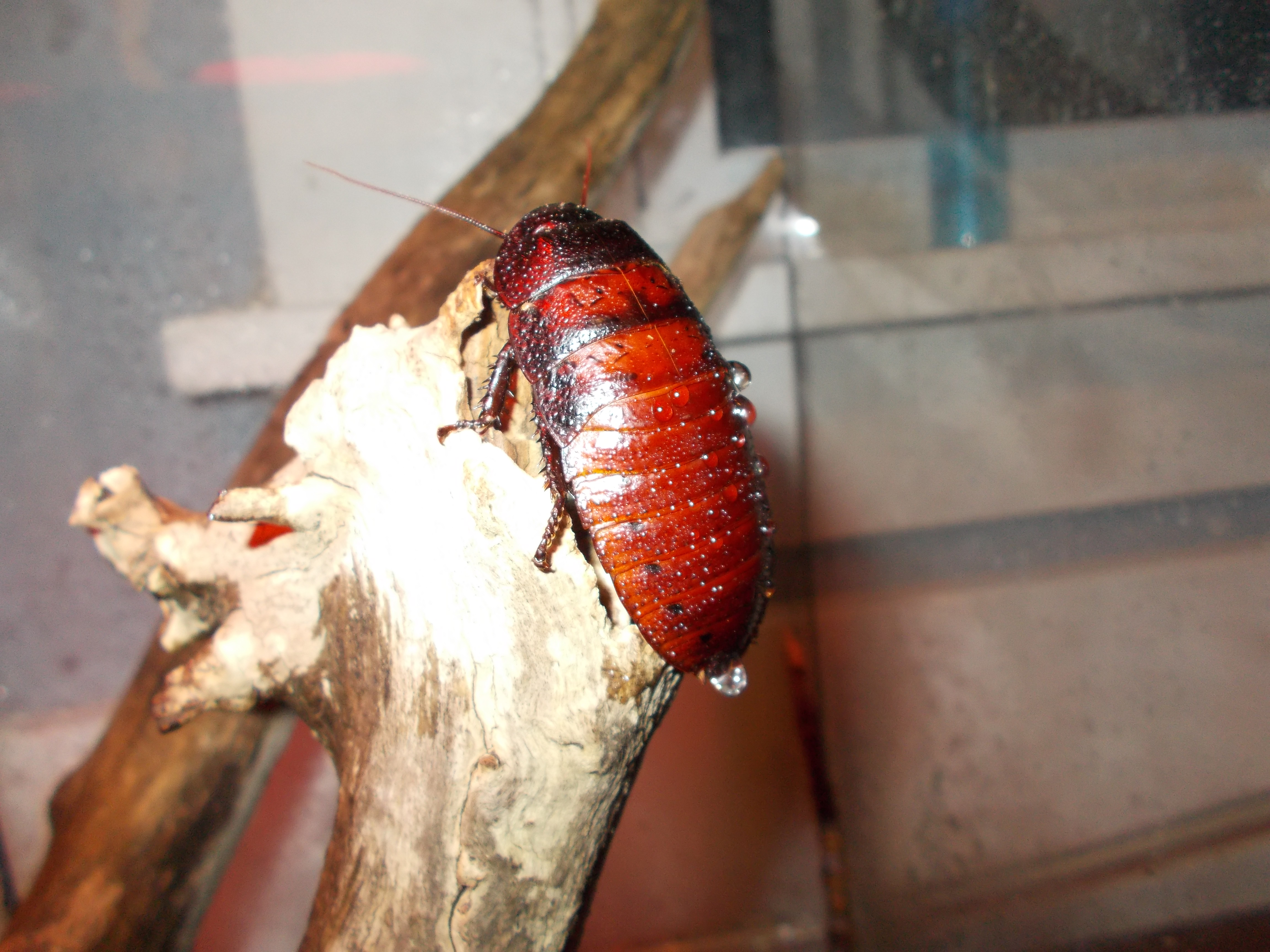

In September 2006, amusement park Six Flags Great America announced that it would be granting unlimited line-jumping privileges (for all rides) to anyone who could eat a live Madagascar hissing cockroach, as part of a Halloween-themed promotion for their annual FrightFest. Furthermore, if a contestant managed to beat the previous world record (eating 36 cockroaches in 1 minute), they would receive season passes, for four people, for the 2007 season. Despite any protein or additional nutrients, cockroaches contain a mild neurotoxin that numbs the mouth and makes it difficult to swallow. The promotion ended on October 29, 2006.

Since 2011 the Bronx Zoo has held a roach-naming and gifting program themed for Valentine's Day allowing their Madagascar hissing cockroaches to be named by benefactors. Funds raised are donated to Wildlife Conservation Society, the parent nonprofit organization of the zoo.

== As pets ==
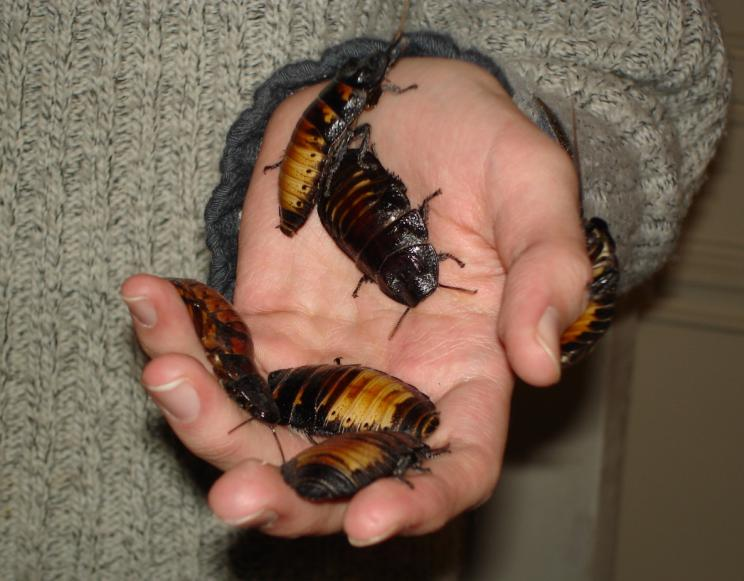
Hissing roaches kept as pets

Madagascar cockroaches can be kept as exotic pets. They require a small living area with an area for them to hide because they dislike light sources. The cockroaches prefer warmth and cannot function in cold weather. Due to their propensity to climb, the living area must be tested to see if they can climb it as they do in their natural environment. Fish tanks with screens work best but it is also wise to coat the top few inches with petroleum jelly to keep them from getting out of the habitat that they are kept in. They can live on fresh vegetables along with any kind of pellet food that is high in protein, such as dry dog food.

In the US, some states require permits before this species can be kept as a pet or in breeding colonies. The state of Florida requires such a permit. This is because of the similarity between Madagascar and Florida in climate, which makes them potentially invasive. In fact, during outreach programs, the University of Florida's Department of Entomology and Nematology, which has such a permit, allows only males to be taken out of the laboratory. This is to prevent the possible introduction of a pregnant female into the environment. It is also possible to raise them to feed other pets, as they are reasonably high in protein.
