= Portland General Electric Company Station "L" Group =

Historic building complex in Portland, Oregon, U.S.

- Formerly listed on the U.S. National Register of Historic Places
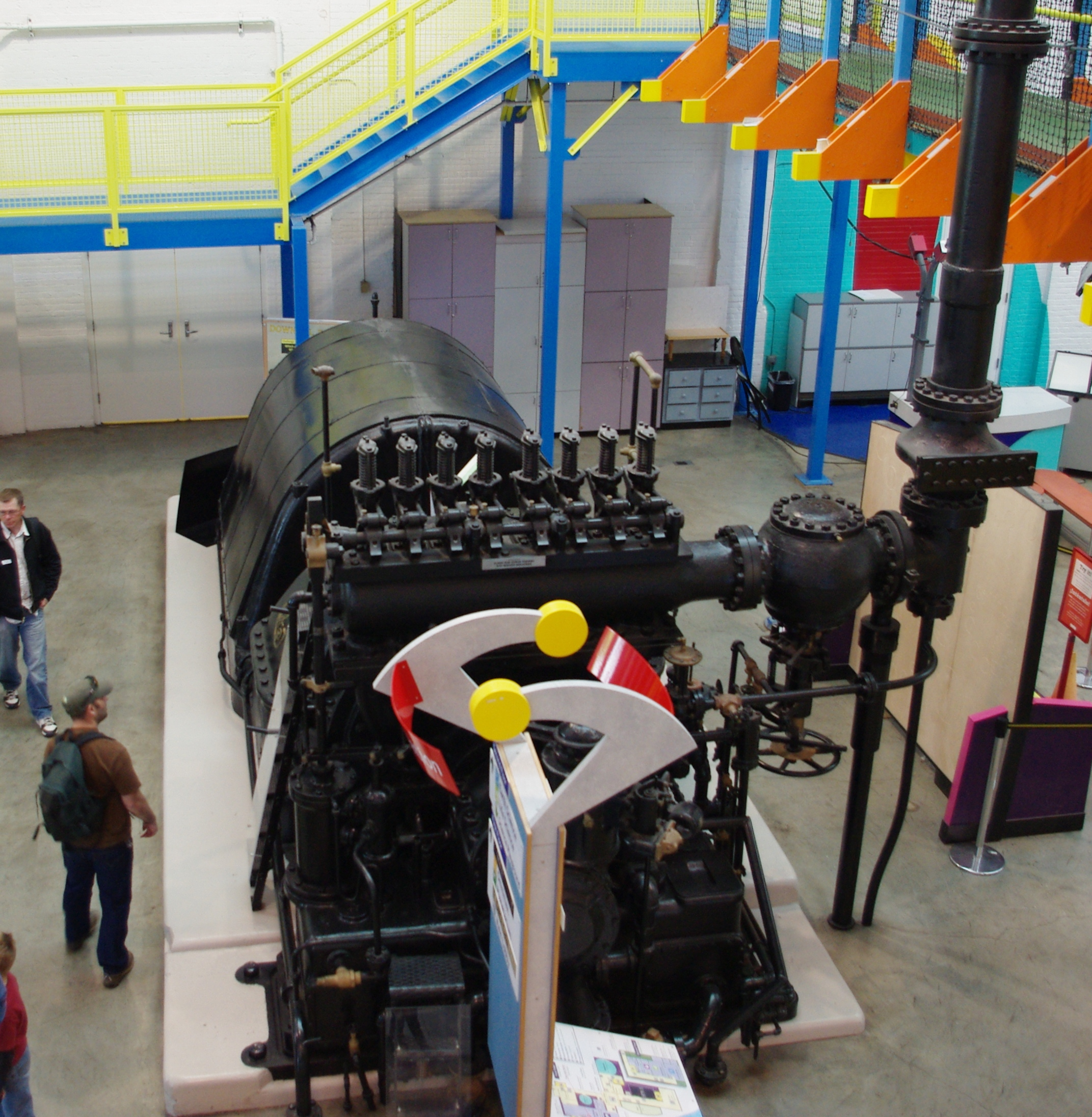
- Turbine Hall, formerly part of Station L, at OMSI

- Location within Portland, Oregon Location within Oregon Location within the United States
- Location: 1841 SE Water Avenue; Portland, Oregon
- Coordinates: 45°30′31″N 122°39′59″W
- Area: 4.7 acres (1.9 ha)
- Built: 1910–1929
- Architectural style: Industrial
- NRHP reference No.: 85003090

Significant dates
- Added to NRHP: December 2, 1985
- Removed from NRHP: December 2, 2020

The Portland General Electric Company Station "L" Group in southeast Portland in the U.S. state of Oregon was a cluster of six industrial buildings listed on the National Register of Historic Places. Built between 1910 and 1929 by Portland General Electric (PGE), it was added to the register in 1985. In 1986, PGE gave Station L and 18.5 acres (7.5 ha) of land to the Oregon Museum of Science and Industry (OMSI). The Station L turbine is a central feature of OMSI's Turbine Hall. The complex was listed on the National Register in 1985, and was delisted in 2020.

Station L was on the east bank of the Willamette River just south of the Marquam Bridge. The parcel of land on which the six historic one- or two-story structures rested occupied 4.7 acres (1.9 ha) of a larger property owned by PGE. All six were used to house equipment for generating electricity.

Five of the listed buildings—the turbine room, the LP boiler room, the Lincoln Substation, the HP boiler room addition, and the 1929 powerhouse extension—were structurally connected. The sixth building, the Stephens Substation, was slightly northeast of the connected buildings. At the time of nomination to the National Register in 1985, the structural condition of the buildings varied from very poor to very good. Major equipment in these buildings in 1985 included an overhead crane, a turbine generator, electric switchgear, furnaces, conveyors, elevated walkways, concrete storage racks, boilers, and pipes. Taken as a whole, the group was the "last relatively complete major wood-fired steam-powered generating station in the Pacific Northwest".

== History ==
Station L was built on property that had belonged to James B. Stephens, a barrel maker who emigrated to the Oregon Country in 1844. After buying land along the Willamette River from John McLoughlin, Stephens built a house and a boat dock, established a river ferry, and in 1861 laid out the city of East Portland on the property. Rails for the Oregon Central Railroad were delivered by steamboat to Stephen's dock and laid through East Portland in 1869.

In 1892, to provide electricity for streetcars and lighting for a growing population, three Portland-area businessmen—Parker F. Morey, Henry Failing, and Frederick Van Voorhies Holman—formed PGE. About a month after it was created, PGE acquired the Willamette Falls Electric Company, which generated hydroelectricity at Willamette Falls in Oregon City, and began buying or building thermal power stations at various locations in the vicinity of Portland. Among these stations, labeled A through M, Station L was one. It was located near the Inman-Poulson Lumber Company, which supplied wood waste to fuel the station's steam boilers and which used electricity to run its machines. This arrangement continued through 1954, when the lumber company went out of business. Although Station L's boilers were converted to burn oil or natural gas instead of wood waste, its electricity became more expensive to produce than the hydroelectricity that PGE could buy from the Bonneville Power Administration. PGE put the station on "cold standby" in 1964 and shut it completely in 1975.

Station L
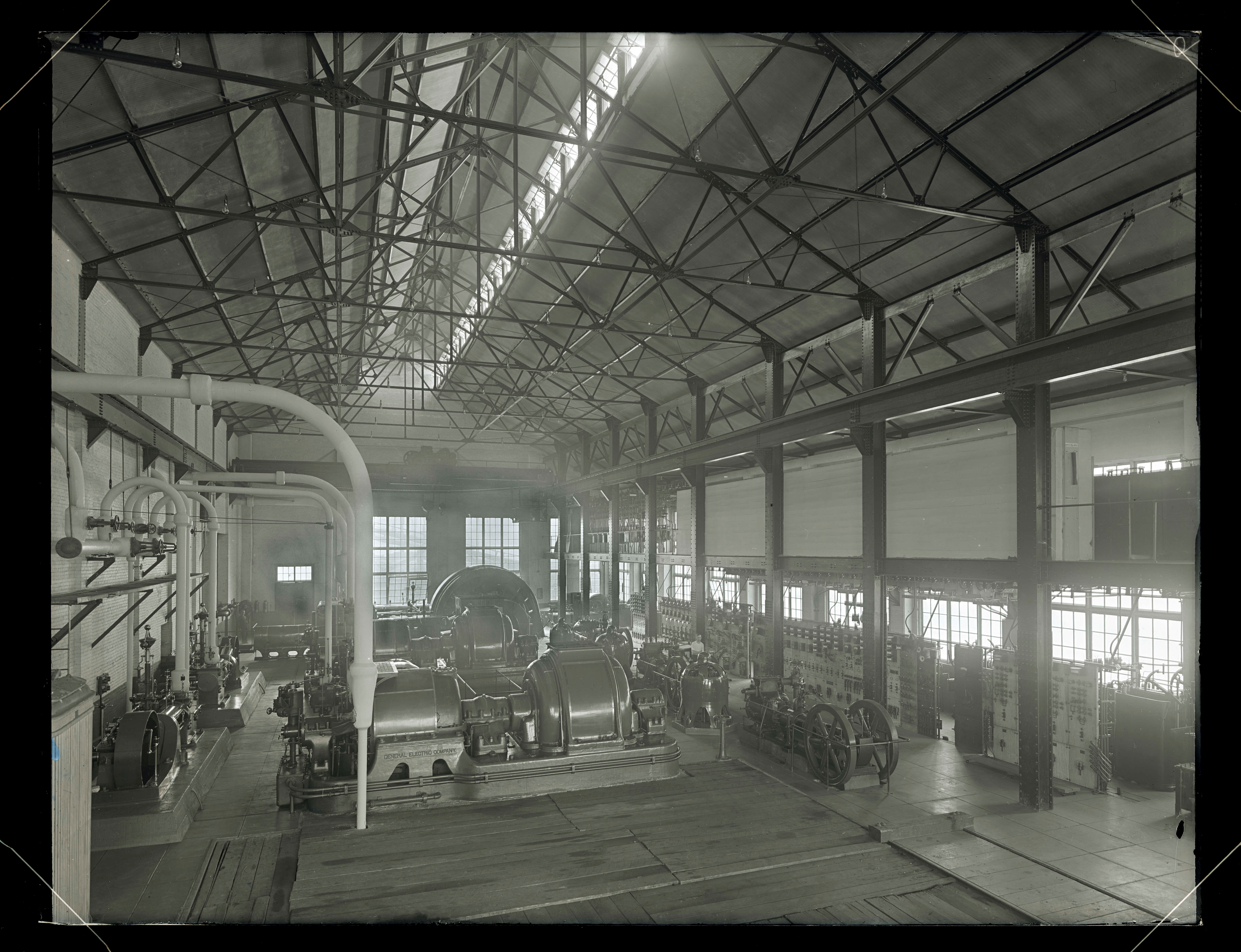
Interior view of Station L's turbine hall

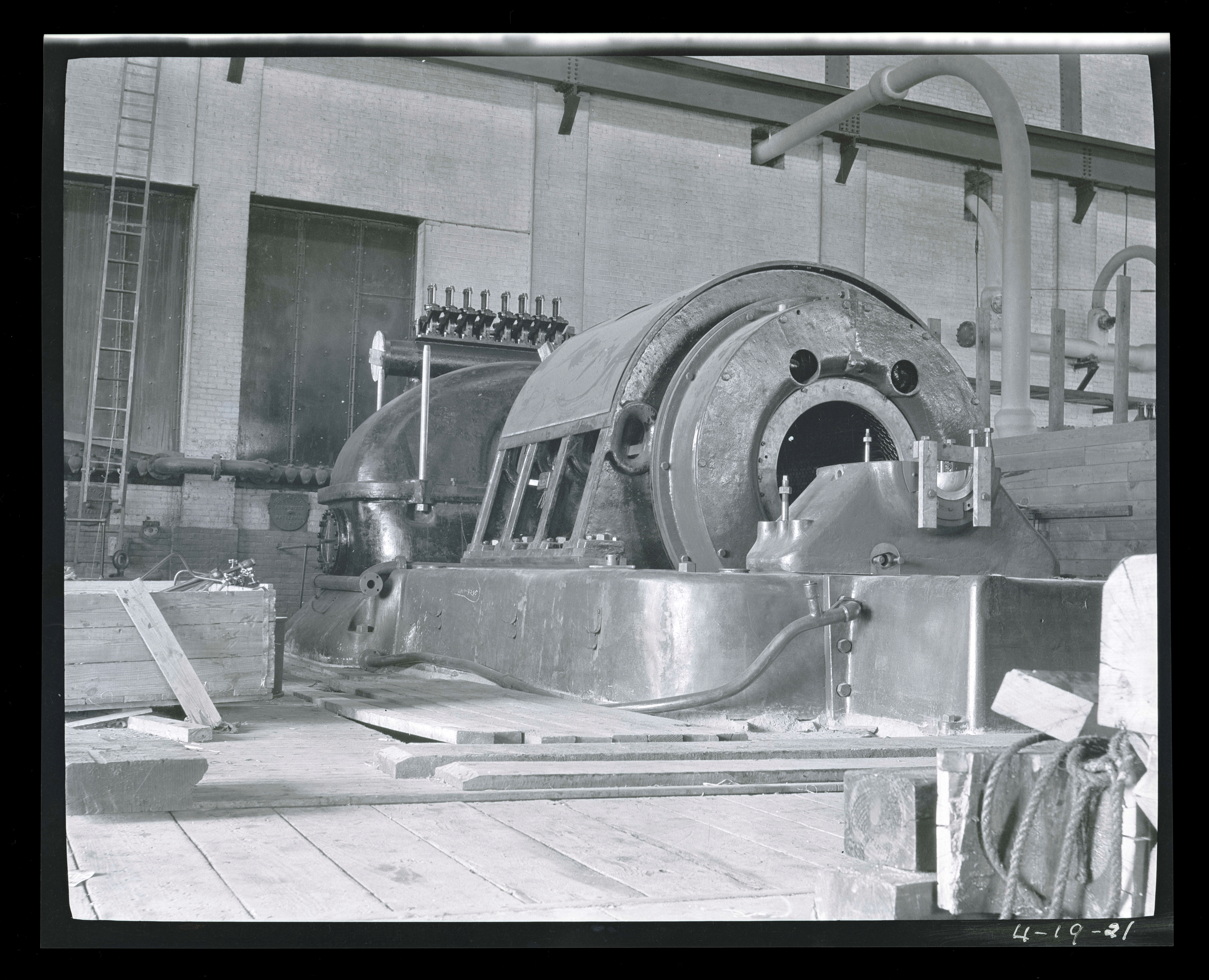
Turbine being assembled

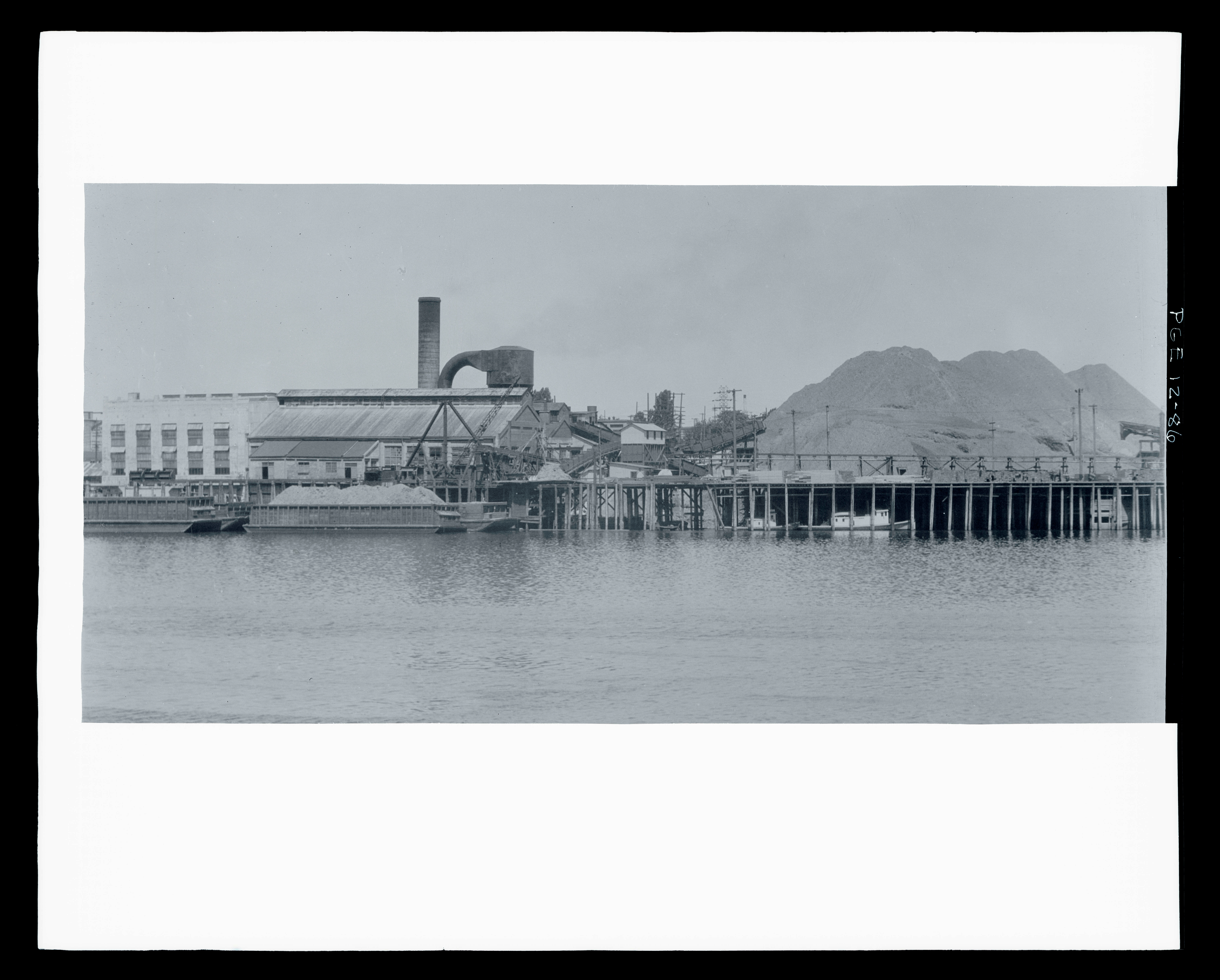
Exterior view

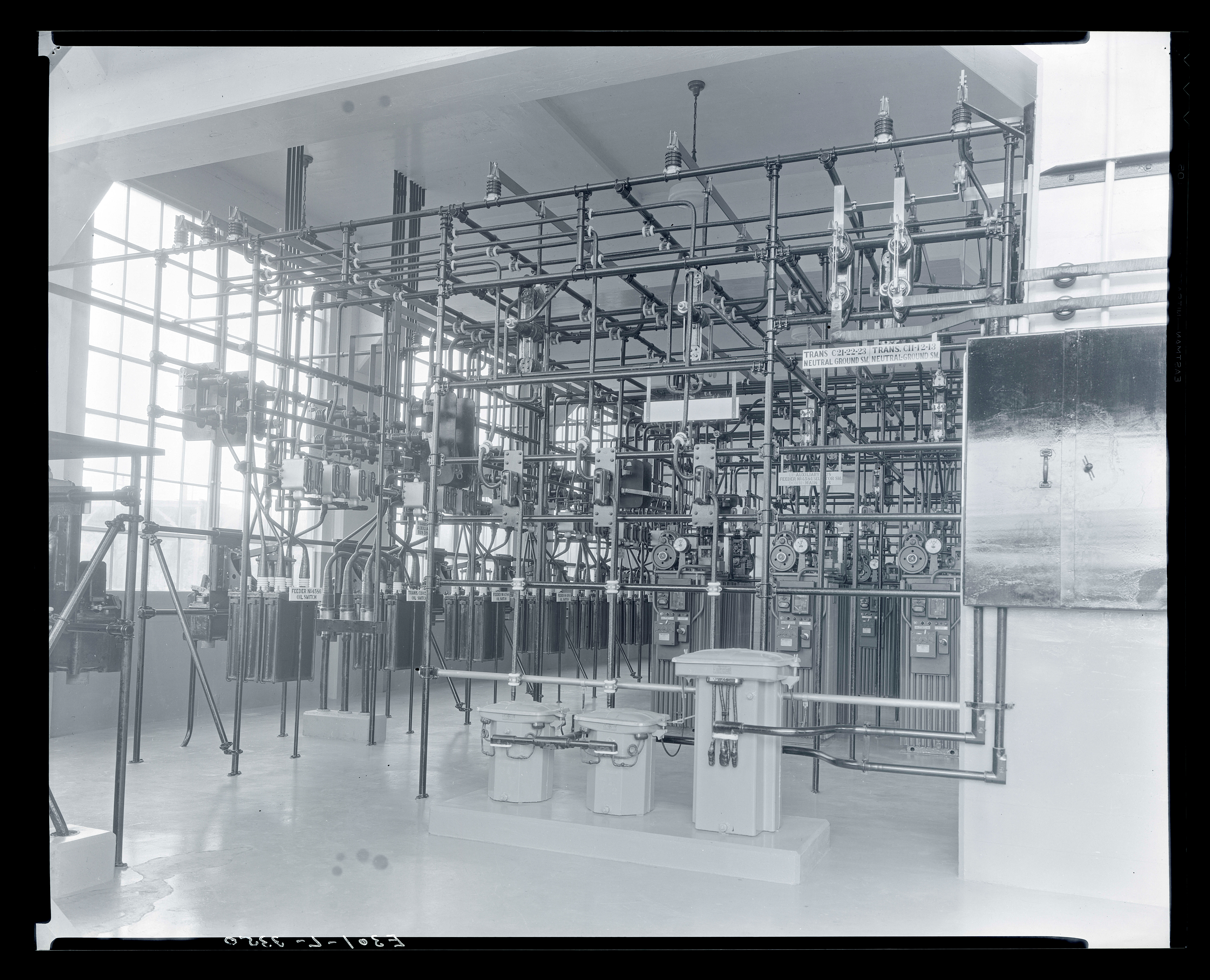
Interior view

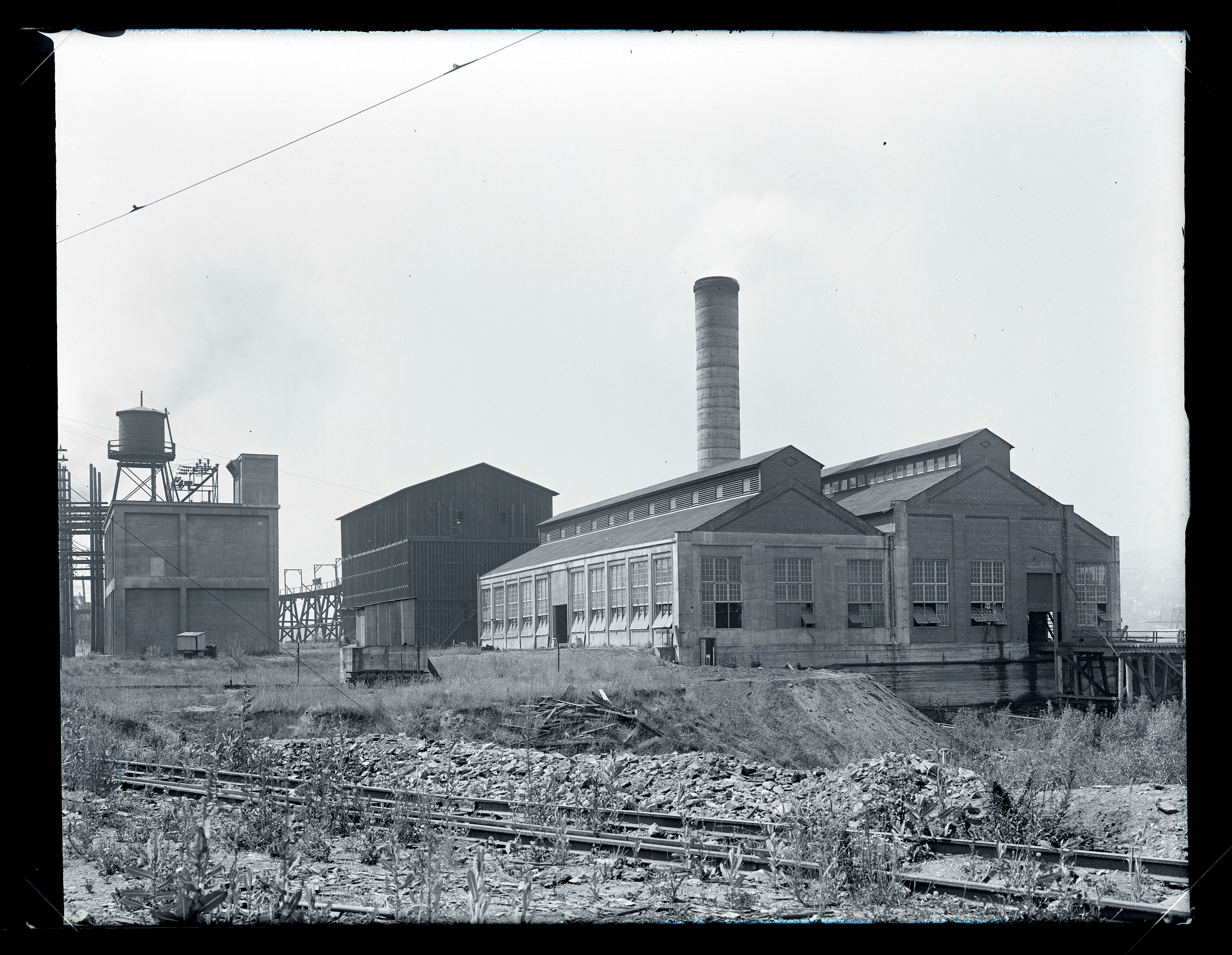
Exterior view

== See also ==
- National Register of Historic Places listings in Southeast Portland, Oregon
