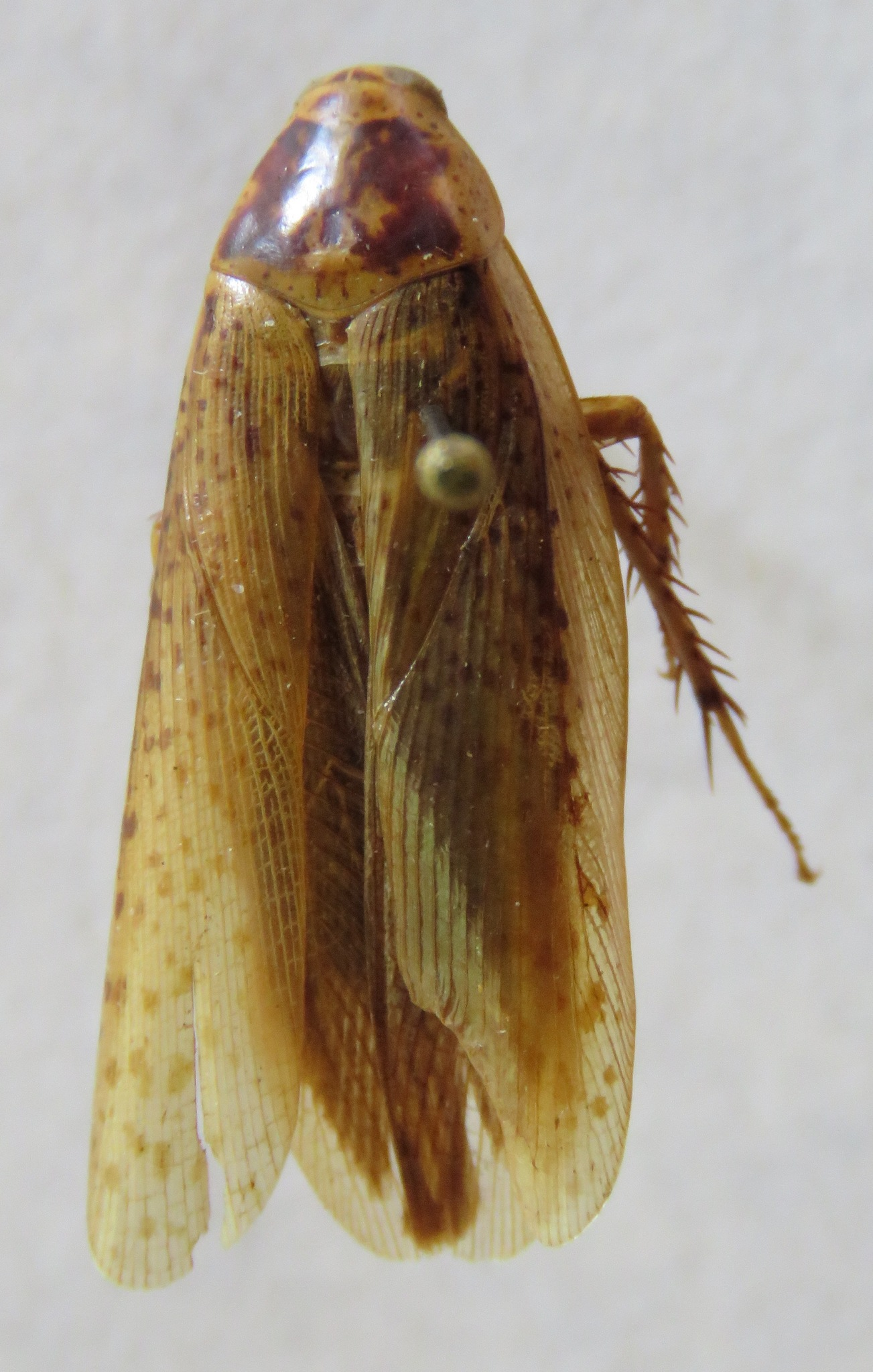
- Epilampra mexicana

Scientific classification
- Kingdom: Animalia
- Phylum: Arthropoda
- Clade: Pancrustacea
- Class: Insecta
- Order: Blattodea
- Family: Blaberidae
- Subfamily: Epilamprinae
- Genus: Epilampra; Burmeister, 1838

= Epilampra =

Genus of cockroaches

Epilampra is a genus of cockroach in the family Blaberidae. There are more than 70 described species in the genus Epilampra.

== Species ==
These 71 species belong to the genus Epilampra:

- Epilampra abdomennigrum (De Geer, 1773)
- Epilampra acutipennis (Serville, 1838)
- Epilampra amapae Rocha e Silva & Gurney, 1962
- Epilampra amoena Rocha e Silva, 1965
- Epilampra anderi Princis, 1946
- Epilampra azteca Saussure, 1868
- Epilampra basistriga Walker, 1868
- Epilampra belli Fisk & Schal, 1981
- Epilampra berlandi Hebard, 1921
- Epilampra bivittata Saussure, 1864
- Epilampra brasiliensis (Fabricius, 1775)
- Epilampra bromeliacea Princis, 1965
- Epilampra bromeliadarum (Caudell, 1914)
- Epilampra burmeisteri (Guérin-Méneville, 1857)
- Epilampra caizana Giglio-Tos, 1897
- Epilampra caliginosa Walker, 1868
- Epilampra campestris Rocha e Silva & Aguiar, 1978
- Epilampra carsevennae Bonfils, 1975
- Epilampra castanea Brunner von Wattenwyl, 1865
- Epilampra cicatricosa (Rehn, 1903)
- Epilampra cinerascens Brunner von Wattenwyl, 1865
- Epilampra colorata Rocha e Silva & Gurney, 1962
- Epilampra columbiana Saussure, 1895
- Epilampra conferta Walker, 1868
- Epilampra conspersa Burmeister, 1838
- Epilampra crassa Saussure, 1868
- Epilampra crossea Saussure, 1864
- Epilampra cubensis Bolívar, 1888
- Epilampra egregia Hebard, 1926
- Epilampra exploratrix (Gurney, 1942)
- Epilampra fugax (Bonfils, 1969)
- Epilampra fusca Brunner von Wattenwyl, 1865
- Epilampra grisea (De Geer, 1773)
- Epilampra guianae Hebard, 1926
- Epilampra gundlachi Rehn & Hebard, 1927
- Epilampra haitensis Rehn & Hebard, 1927
- Epilampra heusseriana Saussure, 1864
- Epilampra heydeniana Saussure, 1864
- Epilampra hualpensis Uribe, 1978
- Epilampra imitatrix Saussure & Zehntner, 1893
- Epilampra insularis Bolívar, 1888
- Epilampra involucris Fisk & Schal, 1981
- Epilampra irmleri Rocha e Silva & Aguiar, 1978
- Epilampra jorgenseni (Rehn, 1913)
- Epilampra josephi Giglio-Tos, 1898
- Epilampra latifrons Saussure & Zehntner, 1893
- Epilampra limbalis Brancsik, 1901
- Epilampra maculicollis (Serville, 1838)
- Epilampra maculifrons Stål, 1860
- Epilampra maya Rehn, 1903 (maya cockroach)
- Epilampra mexicana Saussure, 1862
- Epilampra mimosa Rocha e Silva & Aguiar, 1978
- Epilampra mona Rehn & Hebard, 1927
- Epilampra opaca Walker, 1868
- Epilampra pereirae Lopes, Oliveira & Assumpção, 2014
- Epilampra quisqueiana Rehn & Hebard, 1927
- Epilampra rothi Fisk & Schal, 1981
- Epilampra sabulosa Walker, 1868
- Epilampra sagitta Hebard, 1929
- Epilampra savinierii [temporary name]
- Epilampra shelfordi Hebard, 1919
- Epilampra sodalis Walker, 1868
- Epilampra substrigata Walker, 1868
- Epilampra tainana Rehn & Hebard, 1927
- Epilampra taira Hebard, 1926
- Epilampra taracuae Princis, 1948
- Epilampra testacea Brunner von Wattenwyl, 1865
- Epilampra thunbergi Princis, 1949
- Epilampra unistilata Fisk & Schal, 1981
- Epilampra wheeleri Rehn, 1910
- Epilampra yersiniana Saussure, 1864
