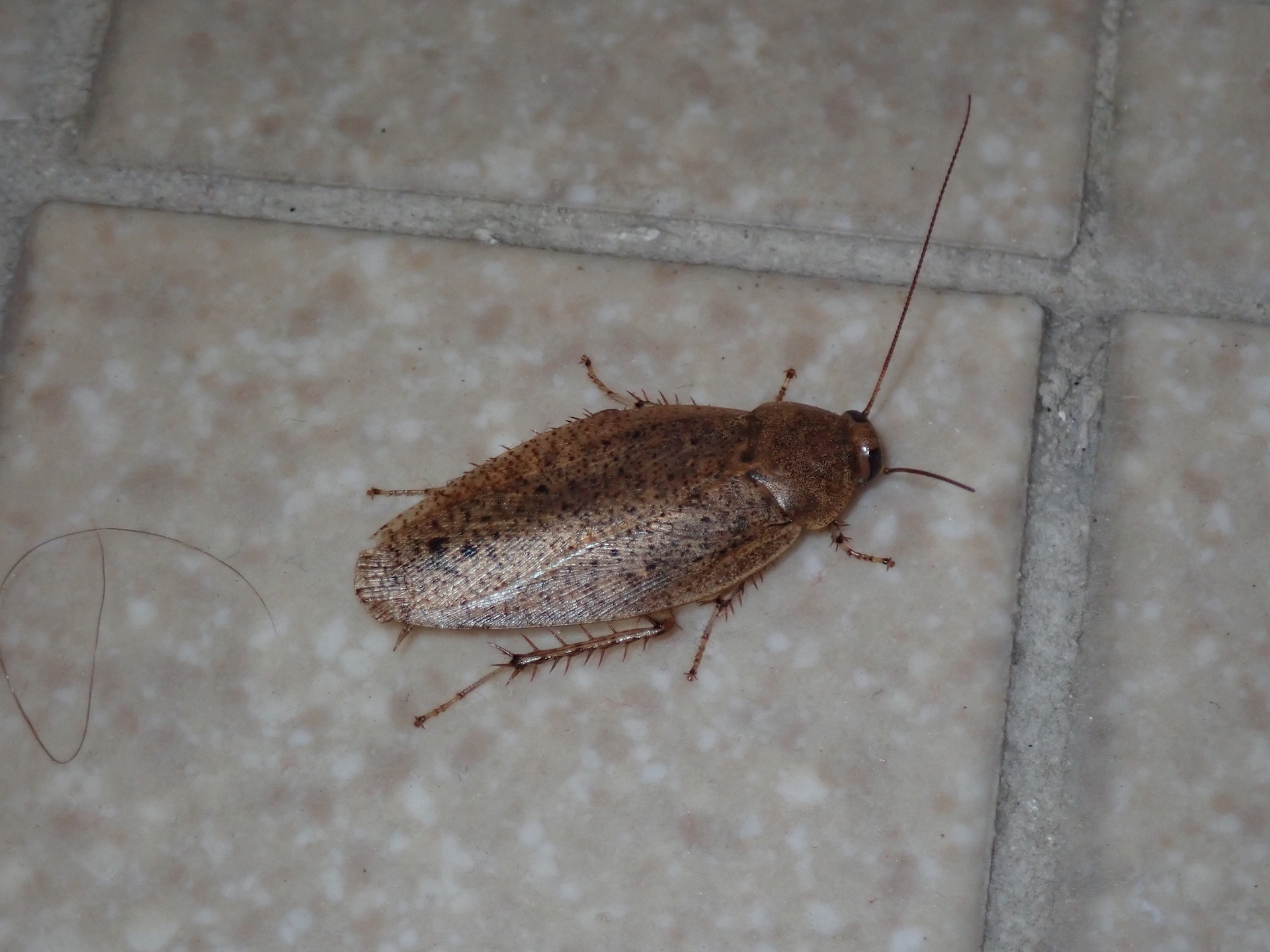

Scientific classification
- Kingdom: Animalia
- Phylum: Arthropoda
- Clade: Pancrustacea
- Class: Insecta
- Order: Blattodea
- Family: Blaberidae
- Subfamily: Epilamprinae
- Genus: Epilampra
- Species: E. maya

Binomial name
- Epilampra maya Rehn, 1903

= Epilampra maya =

Species of cockroach

Epilampra maya, the Maya cockroach, is a species of cockroach in the family Blaberidae. It is found in Central America and North America.
