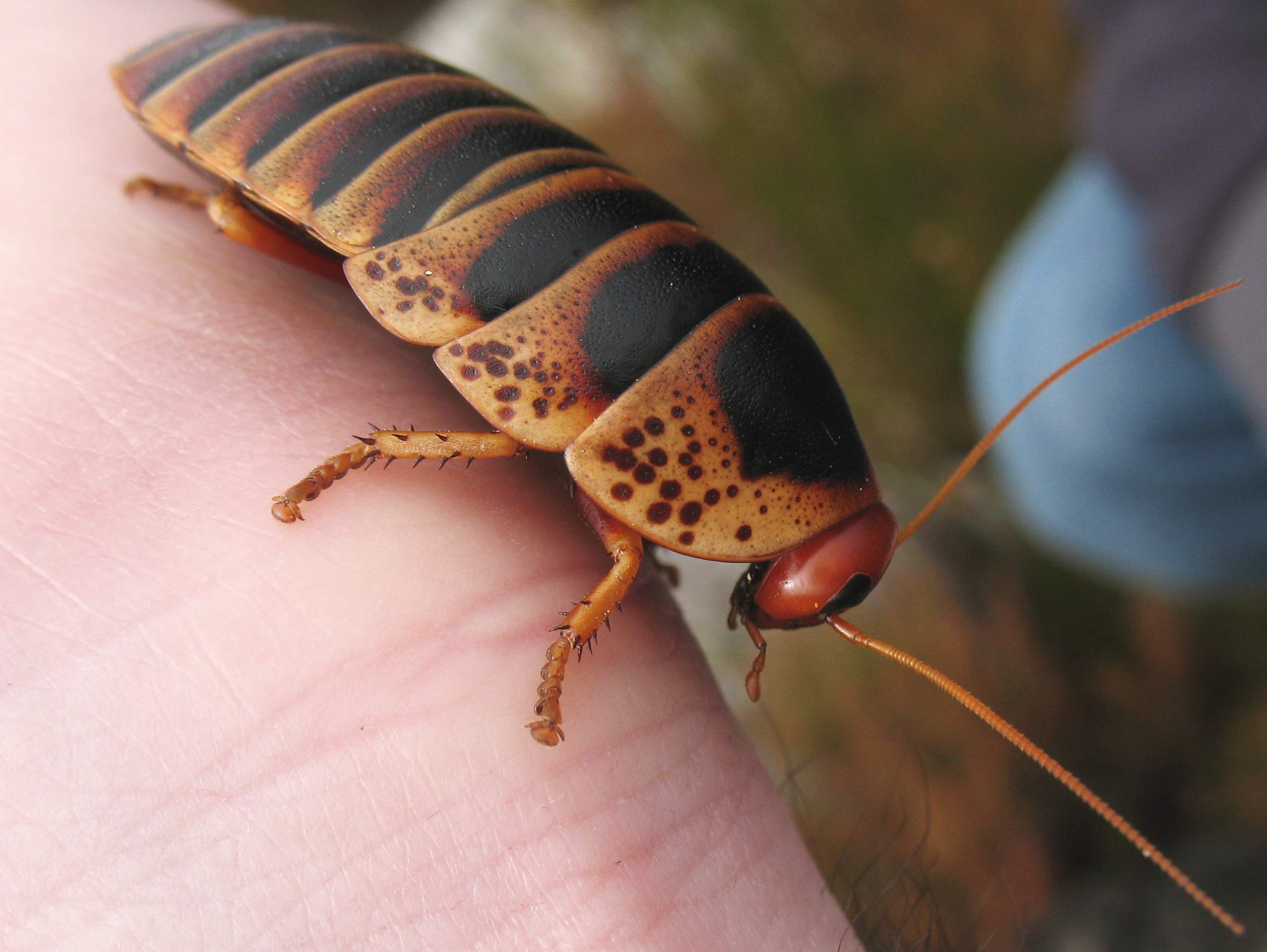
- CockroachSwartbos.

Scientific classification
- Domain: Eukaryota
- Kingdom: Animalia
- Phylum: Arthropoda
- Class: Insecta
- Order: Blattodea
- Family: Blaberidae
- Subfamily: Epilamprinae
- Genus: Aptera; Saussure, 1864

= Aptera (cockroach) =

Genus of cockroaches

Aptera is a genus of cockroaches belonging to the subfamily Epilamprinae (family Blaberidae).

The species of this genus are found in South Africa.

== Species ==
GBIF lists:

1. Aptera brindlei Anisyutkin & Yushkova, 2017
2. Aptera fusca (Thunberg, 1784)
3. Aptera munda (F.Walker, 1868)
