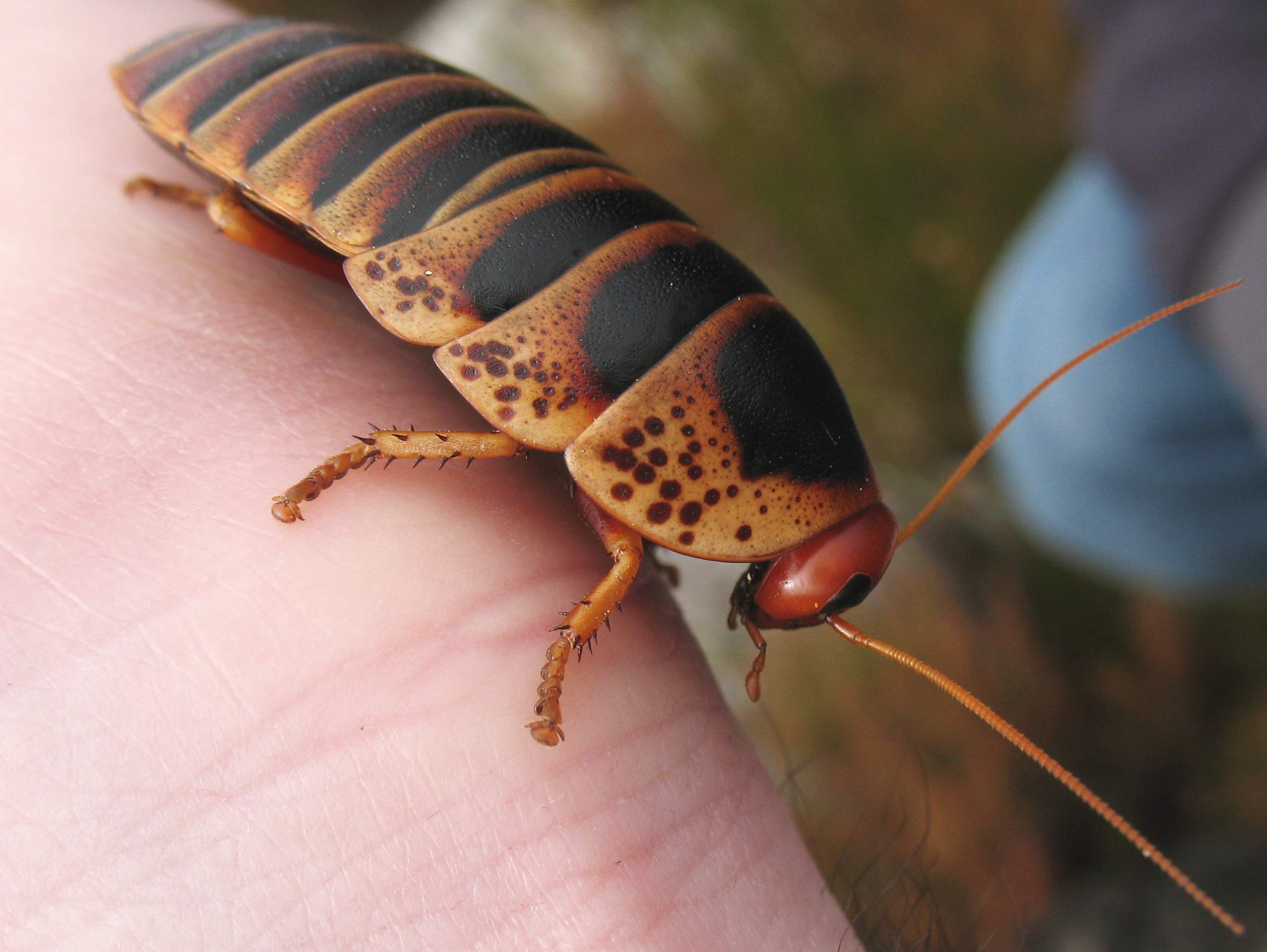

Scientific classification
- Domain: Eukaryota
- Kingdom: Animalia
- Phylum: Arthropoda
- Class: Insecta
- Order: Blattodea
- Family: Blaberidae
- Genus: Aptera
- Species: A. fusca

Binomial name
- Aptera fusca (Thunberg, 1784)

= Aptera fusca =

Species of cockroach

Aptera fusca, the Cape Mountain cockroach, giant cockroach or Table Mountain cockroach, is a large cockroach which is widespread on low vegetation in open areas in the fynbos biome of the Western Cape region of South Africa. Adult females can be from 30 to 40 millimetres (1.2 to 1.6 in) long. Males are slightly smaller (body length 29 millimetres (1.1 in)) and have dark brown wings, which are absent in females. It is stoutly built, with a reddish head and brown to black body segments with prominent yellow margins. The femora are heavily spined, with the hind tibiae having two very broad ridges with only two rows of spurs. They are nocturnal and herbivorous. Unusually for insects, it gives birth to 18–24 live offspring and protects the young for a while after giving birth. Family groups are found in late summer and autumn: a brood of black nymphs, a wingless female and two or more males, all living in a hidden crack. When alarmed, it raises its abdomen into the air and squeaks loudly; it also releases a foul-smelling liquid from glands on the back when handled and alarmed, producing an indelible brown stain on skin. The only other species in the genus Aptera, A. munda, is rare, and is found in the Richtersveld.
