= List of Orthoptera and allied insects of Great Britain =

The following is a list of the grasshoppers, crickets and allied insect species recorded in Britain. The orders covered by this list are:

- Orthoptera – grasshoppers and crickets
- Dermaptera – earwigs
- Blattodea – cockroaches

This article lists the native species only. A number of other species have been found in the wild as vagrants or introduced species. Many of the Orthopteran common names were synthesised from older sources or coined where necessary by Dr. D. R. Ragge.

== Order Orthoptera (grasshoppers and crickets) ==
=== Suborder Ensifera (crickets) ===
==== Family Tettigoniidae (bush-crickets) ====
- Oak bush-cricket, Meconema thalassinum
- Southern oak bush-cricket, Meconema meridionale (since 2001)
- Great green bush-cricket, Tettigonia viridissima
- Wart-biter, Decticus verrucivorus
- Dark bush-cricket, Pholidoptera griseoaptera
- Grey bush-cricket, Platycleis albopunctata
- Bog bush-cricket, Metrioptera brachyptera
- Roesel's bush-cricket, Roeseliana roeselii
- Long-winged conehead, Conocephalus fuscus
- Short-winged Conehead, Conocephalus dorsalis
- Speckled bush-cricket, Leptophyes punctatissima

==== Super-family Grylloidea ====
Family Gryllidae

- House cricket, Acheta domesticus
- Field cricket, Gryllus campestris

Family Mogoplistidae

- Scaly cricket, Pseudomogoplistes squamiger

Family Trigonidiidae

- Wood cricket, Nemobius sylvestris

==== Family Gryllotalpidae (mole-crickets) ====
- Mole cricket, Gryllotalpa gryllotalpa

=== Suborder Caelifera (grasshoppers and allies) ===
==== Family Tetrigidae (groundhoppers) ====
- Cepero's groundhopper, Tetrix ceperoi
- Slender groundhopper, Tetrix subulata
- Common groundhopper, Tetrix undulata

==== Family Acrididae (grasshoppers) ====
- Large marsh grasshopper, Stethophyma grossum - rare and restricted to the New Forest and Dorset
- Stripe-winged grasshopper, Stenobothrus lineatus
- Lesser mottled grasshopper, Stenobothrus stigmaticus (Isle of Man only)
- Woodland grasshopper, Omocestus rufipes
- Common green grasshopper, Omocestus viridulus
- Field grasshopper, Chorthippus brunneus
- Heath grasshopper, Chorthippus vagans
- Lesser marsh grasshopper, Chorthippus albomarginatus
- Meadow grasshopper, Pseudochorthippus parallelus
- Rufous grasshopper, Gomphocerippus rufus
- Mottled grasshopper, Myrmeleotettix maculatus

== Order Blattodea (cockroaches) ==
=== Family Blattellidae ===
- Dusky cockroach, Ectobius lapponicus
- Tawny cockroach, Ectobius pallidus
- Lesser cockroach, Capraiellus panzeri

== Order Dermaptera (earwigs) ==
=== Family Spongiphoridae ===
- Lesser earwig, Labia minor

=== Family Forficulidae ===
- Short-winged earwig, Apterygida media
- Chelidurella acanthopygia
- Common earwig, Forficula auricularia
- Lesne's earwig, Forficula lesnei

== See also ==
- List of Orthopteroid genera containing species recorded in Europe
