= Chorthippus jutlandica =

Conservation status
- Least Concern (IUCN 3.1)

Scientific classification
- Kingdom: Animalia
- Phylum: Arthropoda
- Class: Insecta
- Order: Orthoptera
- Suborder: Caelifera
- Family: Acrididae
- Genus: Chorthippus
- Species: C. jutlandica

Binomial name
- Chorthippus jutlandica Fogh Nielsen, 2003

Species of grasshopper

Chorthippus jutlandica, the Jutland bow-winged grasshopper, is a species of grasshopper in the subfamily Gomphocerinae. It is endemic to sparsely vegetated coastal sand dunes in an area covering only 87 km^{2} (34 sq mi) between Blåvandshuk and Hvide Sande in western Jutland, Denmark, but it is common (often the most common grasshopper species in its range and habitat) and not considered to be under any threat.

Unusual for a very well-surveyed small country, the species was only scientifically described in 2003, having long been confused with its similar relatives, especially C. biguttulus. It was first noticed in the early 1990s that some grasshoppers in the area had a different song. It is extremely similar to C. biguttulus, C. brunneus and C. mollis (of which only C. brunneus overlaps in range with C. jutlandica) and only males can be reliably separated by details of their forewings and the sound of their stridulation ("song"). C. jutlandica likely is the result of hybrid speciation with the ancient parent species being C. biguttulus and C. brunneus. Today C. jutlandica is essentially reproductively isolated from C. brunneus because females' are uninterested in the other species' song; captive studies have shown that female C. jutlandica are interested in the song of male C. biguttulus, but any interbreeding in the wild is prevented by their separate distributions.
