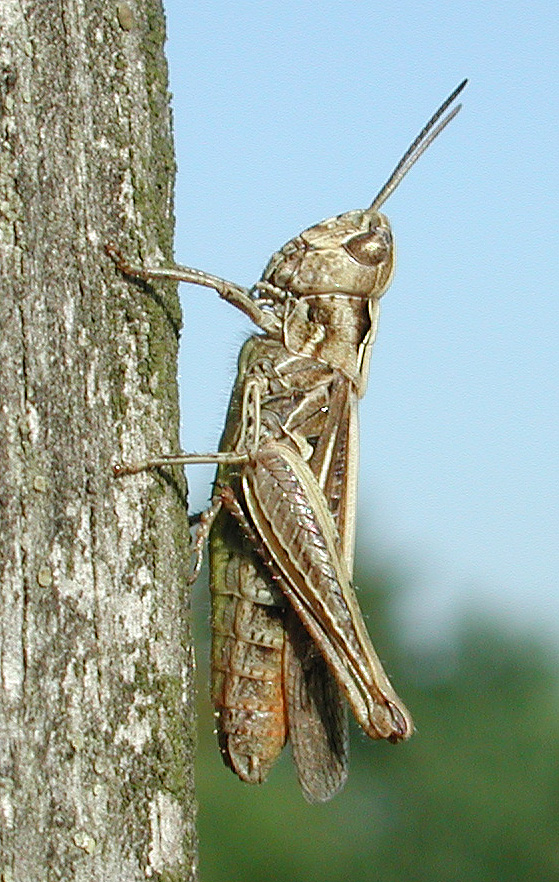
- Chorthippus biguttulus female

Scientific classification
- Kingdom: Animalia
- Phylum: Arthropoda
- Class: Insecta
- Order: Orthoptera
- Suborder: Caelifera
- Family: Acrididae
- Genus: Chorthippus
- Species: C. biguttulus

Binomial name
- Chorthippus biguttulus (Linnaeus, 1758)

= Chorthippus biguttulus =

Species of grasshopper

Close-Up of a Chorthippus biguttulus

Chorthippus biguttulus, the bow-winged grasshopper, is one of the most common species of grasshopper found in the dry grassland of northern and central Europe. It is part of a group of species (biguttulus-group) that are very difficult to identify morphologically. Chorthippus biguttulus was previously classified (with C. brunneus and C. mollis) as a single species Stauroderus variabilis. The three species were distinguished using song characteristics.

== Distribution ==
The range of the bow-winged grasshopper extends from the Finland and Scandinavia in the north to the Alps and Pyrenees in the south, and goes well into Asia including Japan.

== Physical appearance ==
Females grow to approximately 2 cm (0.79 in) and are larger than males that grow to approximately 1.5 cm (0.59 in). Males often have a red tip to the abdomen while females do not. They can be extremely variable in colour from green to black-brown to rose.

C. brunneus, C. bigguttulus and C. mollis are morphologically distinguished by the size of the costal and subcostal fields of the wings. They are more easy recognised by their song patterns.

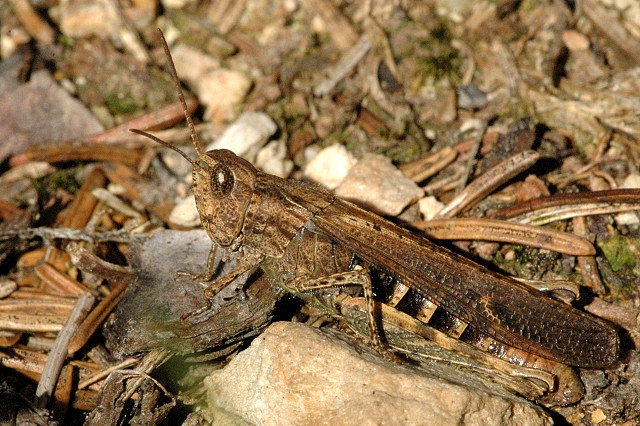
Female Chorthippus biguttulus

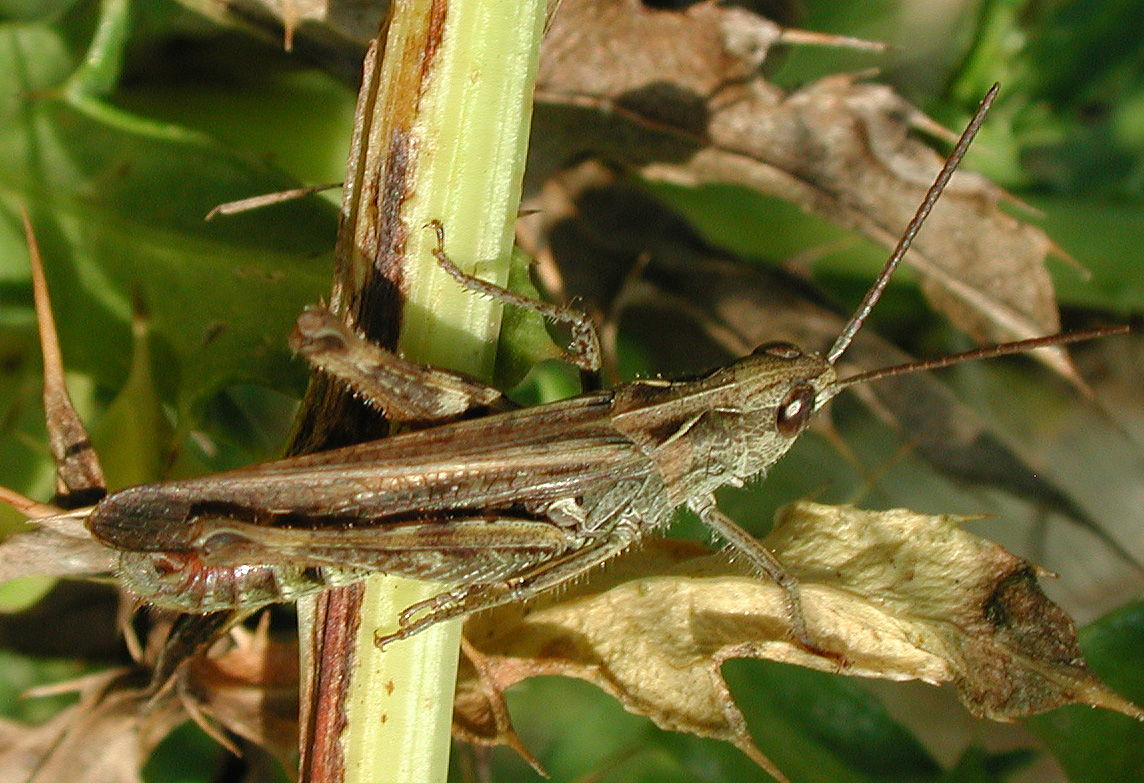
Male Chorthippus biguttulus

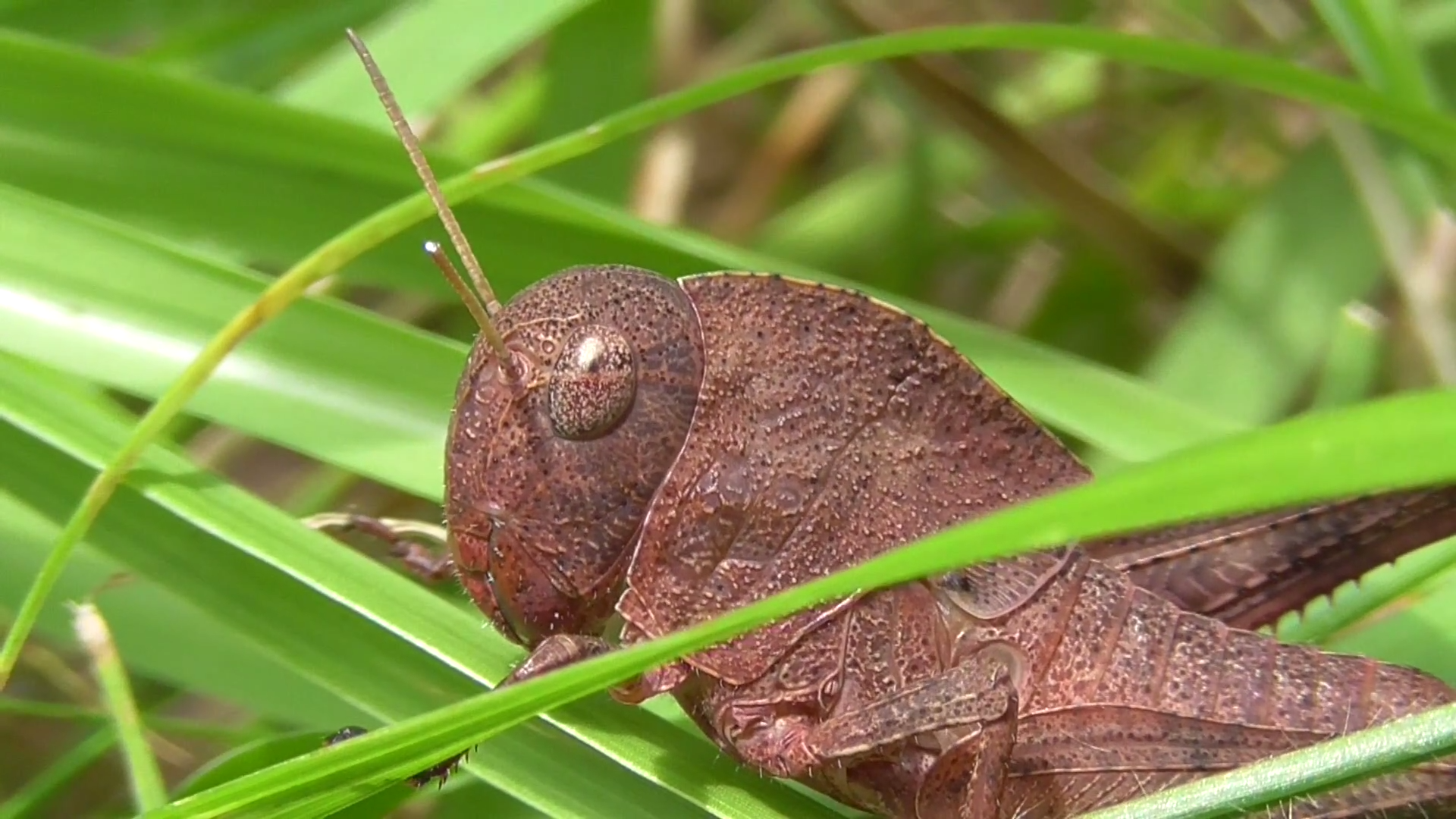
In Tokyo, Japan. They can appear reddish-brown depending on their environment

Chorthippus biguttulus stridulation
Song of Chorthippus biguttulus

Sound of Chorthippus biguttulus
Field recording in the Netherlands 28s

== Calling songs ==
Female C. biguttulus appear to be able to integrate information from male calling songs. An unattractive song subunit has far more impact than an attractive song subunit, an observation consistent with theories of sexual selection because an unattractive song helps females avoid potentially costly interaction with unsuitable mating partners if the song belongs to another species or indicates a low-quality male.
