= Bruneria yukonensis =

Scientific classification
- Domain: Eukaryota
- Kingdom: Animalia
- Phylum: Arthropoda
- Class: Insecta
- Order: Orthoptera
- Suborder: Caelifera
- Family: Acrididae
- Tribe: Gomphocerini
- Genus: Bruneria
- Species: B. yukonensis

Binomial name
- Bruneria yukonensis Vickery, 1969

Species of grasshopper

Bruneria yukonensis, the Yukon slant-faced grasshopper, is a species of slant-faced grasshopper in the family Acrididae. It is endemic to Yukon, Canada.
