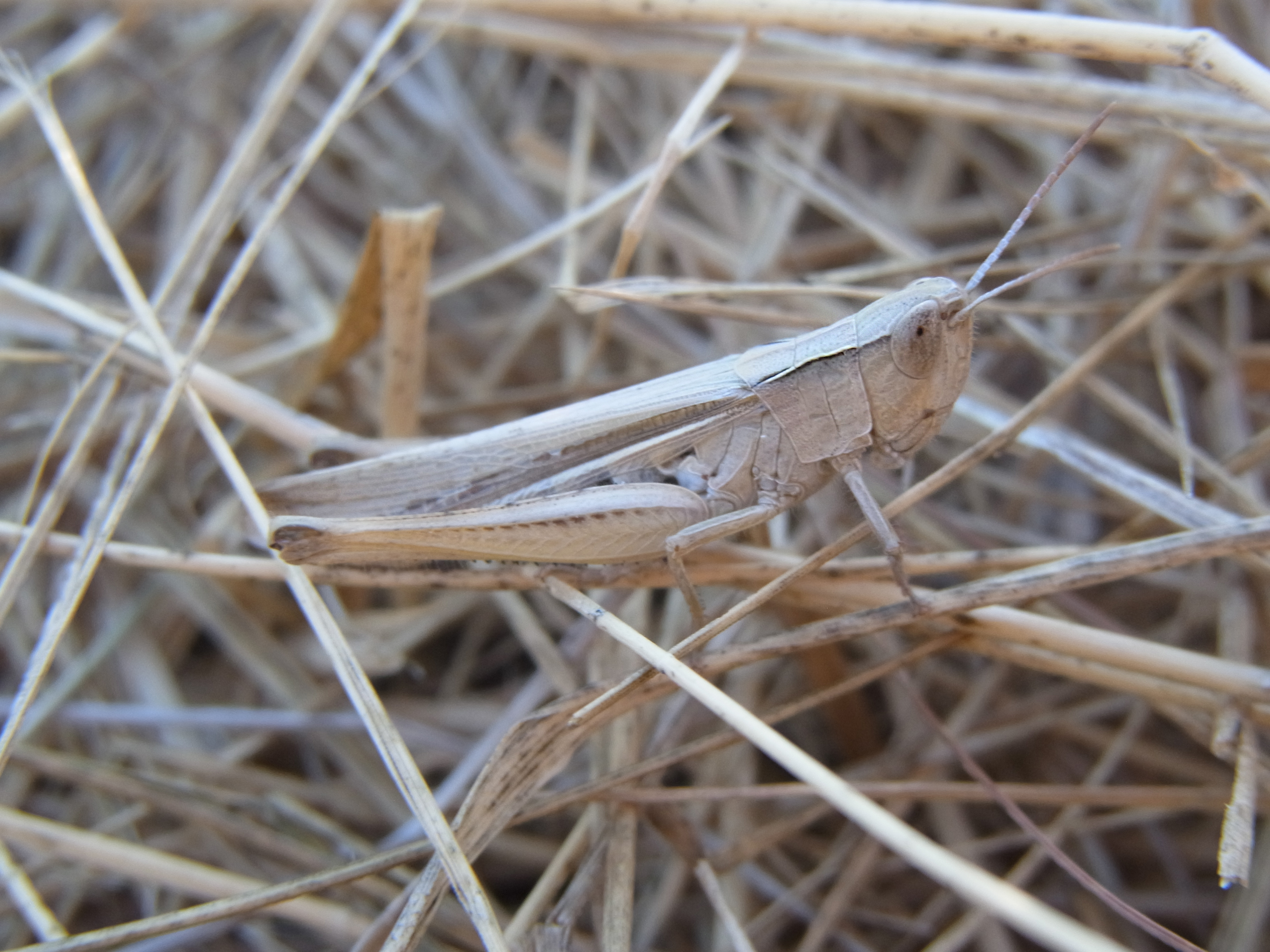
- Chorthippus bornhalmi, Greece

Scientific classification
- Kingdom: Animalia
- Phylum: Arthropoda
- Clade: Pancrustacea
- Class: Insecta
- Order: Orthoptera
- Suborder: Caelifera
- Family: Acrididae
- Subfamily: Gomphocerinae
- Tribe: Gomphocerini
- Genus: Chorthippus
- Species: C. bornhalmi

Binomial name
- Chorthippus bornhalmi Harz, 1971

= Chorthippus bornhalmi =

Species of insect

Video of a Chorthippus bornhalmi

Chorthippus bornhalmi is a species of slant-faced grasshopper in the family Acrididae. It is found in southern Europe and southwest Asia.
