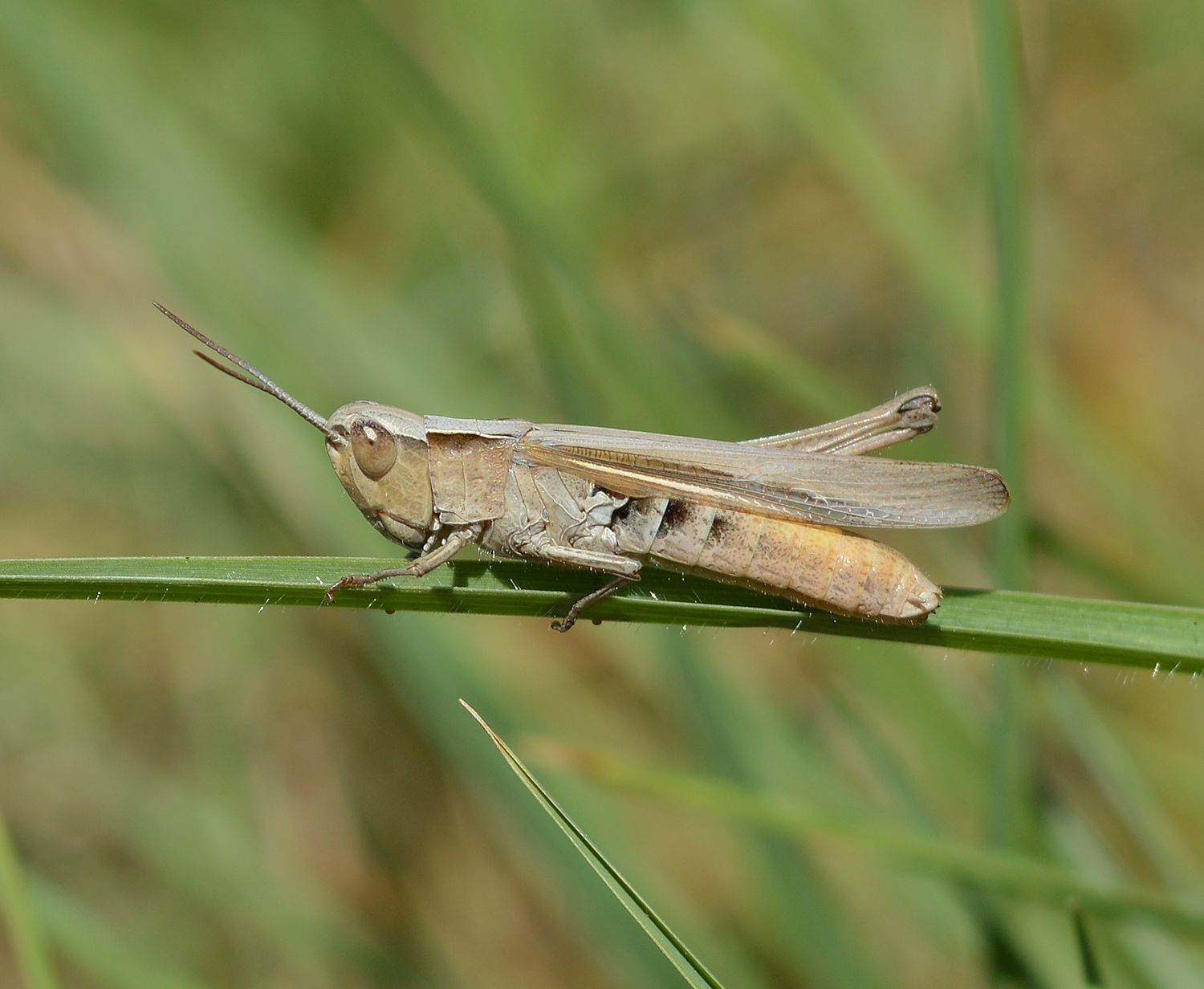
- Chorthippus dichrous, Greece

Scientific classification
- Kingdom: Animalia
- Phylum: Arthropoda
- Clade: Pancrustacea
- Class: Insecta
- Order: Orthoptera
- Suborder: Caelifera
- Family: Acrididae
- Subfamily: Gomphocerinae
- Tribe: Gomphocerini
- Genus: Chorthippus
- Species: C. dichrous

Binomial name
- Chorthippus dichrous (Eversmann, 1859)

= Chorthippus dichrous =

Species of insect

Chorthippus dichrous is a species of slant-faced grasshopper in the family Acrididae. It is found in the Palearctic.

Close-Up of a Chorthippus dichrous
