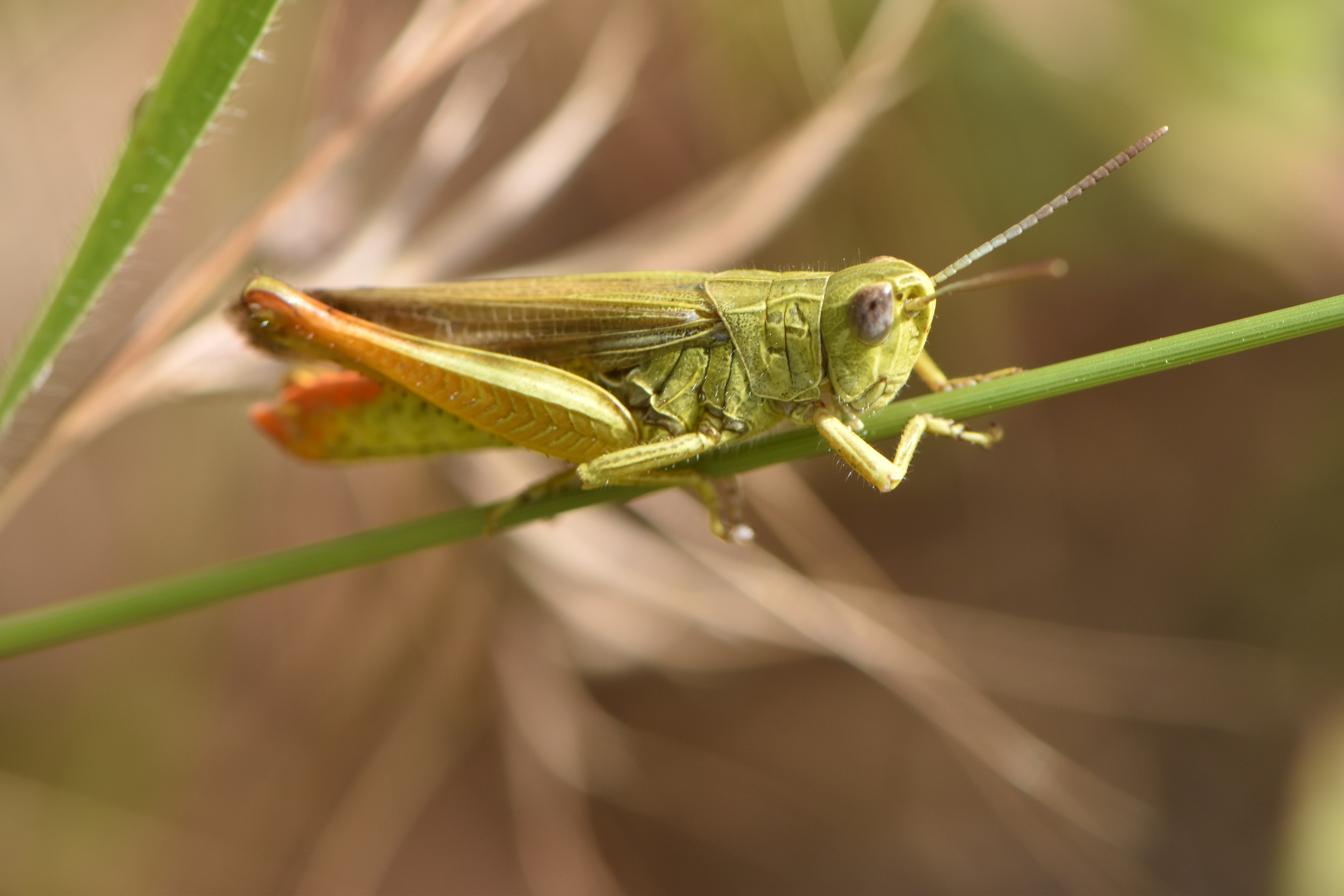
- Chorthippus apicalis

Scientific classification
- Kingdom: Animalia
- Phylum: Arthropoda
- Clade: Pancrustacea
- Class: Insecta
- Order: Orthoptera
- Suborder: Caelifera
- Family: Acrididae
- Subfamily: Gomphocerinae
- Tribe: Gomphocerini
- Genus: Chorthippus
- Species: C. apicalis

Binomial name
- Chorthippus apicalis (Herrich-Schäffer, 1840)

= Chorthippus apicalis =

Species of grasshopper

Chorthippus apicalis is a species of slant-faced grasshopper in the family Acrididae, found on the Iberian Peninsula.

== Subspecies ==
These subspecies belong to the species Chorthippus apicalis:

- Chorthippus apicalis abbreviatus (Bolívar, 1914)
- Chorthippus apicalis apicalis (Herrich-Schäffer, 1840)
