= Bruneria shastana =

Scientific classification
- Domain: Eukaryota
- Kingdom: Animalia
- Phylum: Arthropoda
- Class: Insecta
- Order: Orthoptera
- Suborder: Caelifera
- Family: Acrididae
- Tribe: Gomphocerini
- Genus: Bruneria
- Species: B. shastana

Binomial name
- Bruneria shastana (Scudder, 1881)

Species of grasshopper

Bruneria shastana, the Shasta slant-faced grasshopper, is a species of slant-faced grasshopper in the family Acrididae. It is found in North America.
