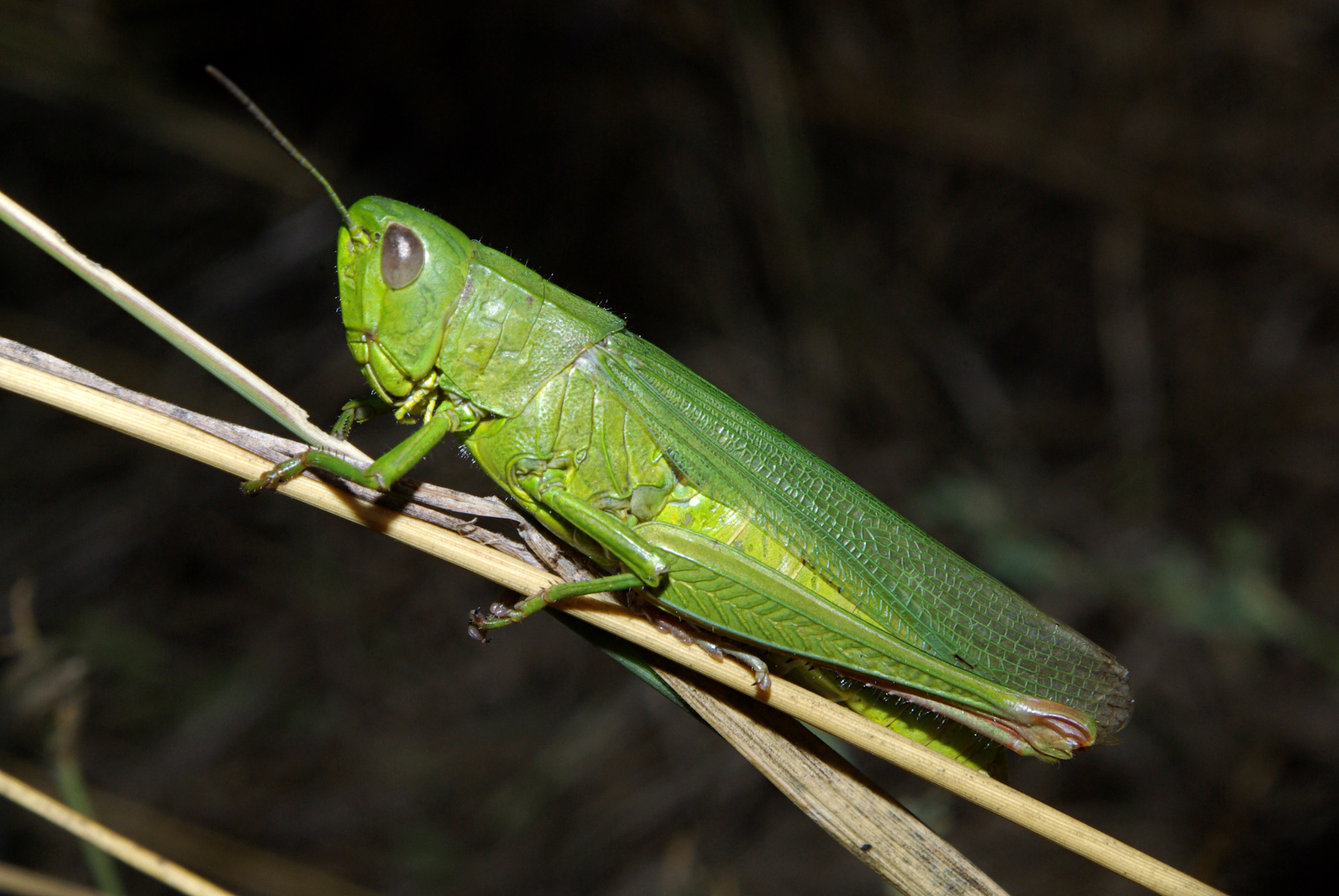
- Chorthippus jucundus, Spain

Scientific classification
- Kingdom: Animalia
- Phylum: Arthropoda
- Clade: Pancrustacea
- Class: Insecta
- Order: Orthoptera
- Suborder: Caelifera
- Family: Acrididae
- Subfamily: Gomphocerinae
- Tribe: Gomphocerini
- Genus: Chorthippus
- Species: C. jucundus

Binomial name
- Chorthippus jucundus (Fischer, 1853)

= Chorthippus jucundus =

Species of grasshopper

Chorthippus jucundus is a species of slant-faced grasshopper in the family Acrididae. It is found in Europe.
