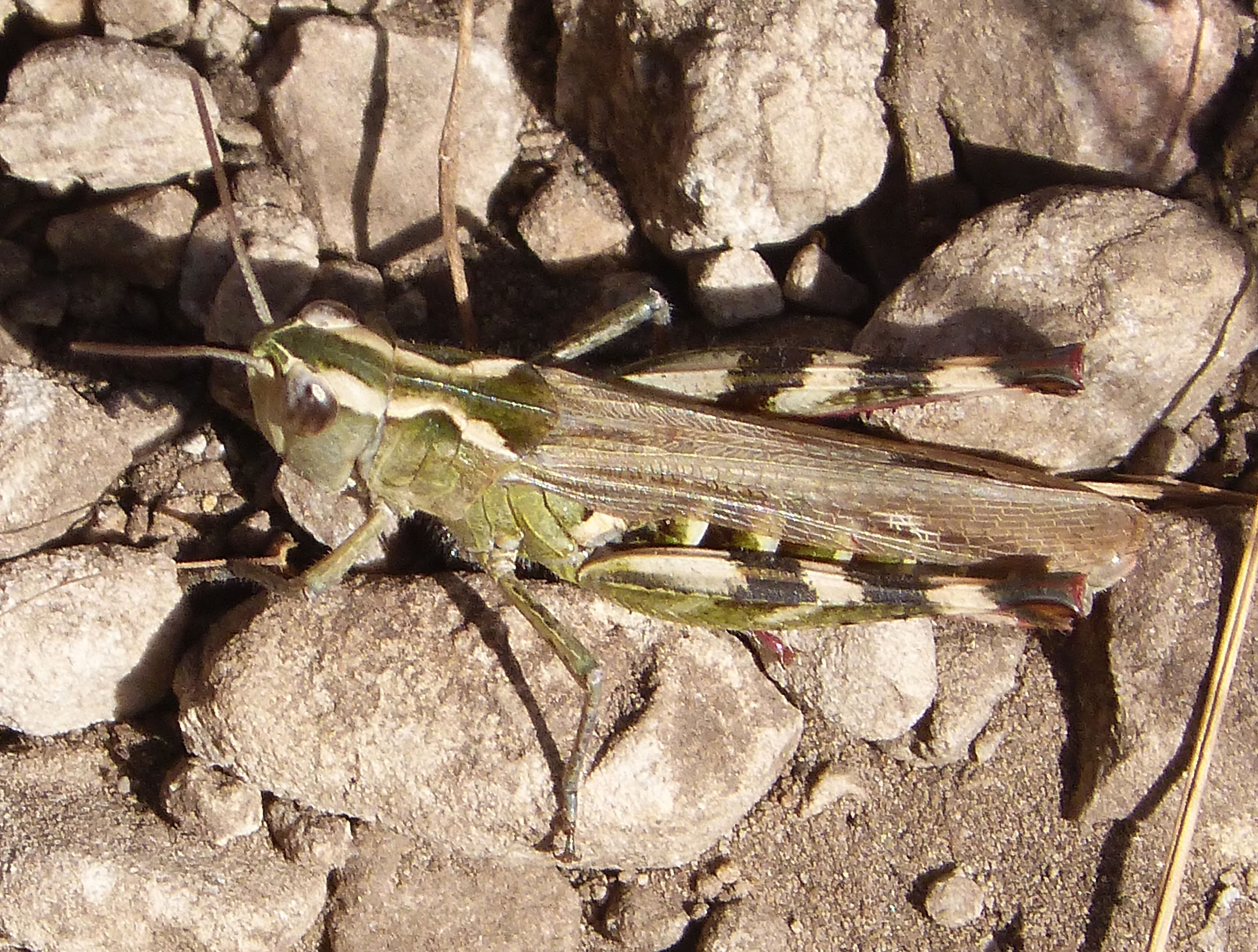
- Chorthippus binotatus, two-marked grasshopper, Spain

Scientific classification
- Kingdom: Animalia
- Phylum: Arthropoda
- Clade: Pancrustacea
- Class: Insecta
- Order: Orthoptera
- Suborder: Caelifera
- Family: Acrididae
- Subfamily: Gomphocerinae
- Tribe: Gomphocerini
- Genus: Chorthippus
- Species: C. binotatus

Binomial name
- Chorthippus binotatus (Charpentier, 1825)

= Chorthippus binotatus =

Species of grasshopper

Chorthippus binotatus, the two-marked grasshopper, is a species of slant-faced grasshopper in the family Acrididae. It is found in Europe.

== Subspecies ==
These subspecies belong to the species Chorthippus binotatus:

- Chorthippus binotatus armoricanus (Defaut, 2015)
- Chorthippus binotatus atlasi Defaut, 1987
- Chorthippus binotatus binotatus (Charpentier, 1825)
