= Mesasippus =

Scientific classification
- Domain: Eukaryota
- Kingdom: Animalia
- Phylum: Arthropoda
- Class: Insecta
- Order: Orthoptera
- Suborder: Caelifera
- Family: Acrididae
- Subfamily: Gomphocerinae
- Tribe: Gomphocerini
- Genus: Mesasippus; Tarbinsky, 1931

Genus of grasshoppers

External image
- Image at Acrida.nsu.ru

Mesasippus is a genus of grasshoppers in the tribe Gomphocerini, erected by Yu S, Tarbinsky in 1931. Species have been recorded from eastern Europe through to central China.

== Species ==
The Orthoptera Species File lists:

1. Mesasippus ammophilus Bey-Bienko, 1948
2. Mesasippus arenosus (Bey-Bienko, 1930) (2 subspecies)
3. Mesasippus barsukiensis Mistshenko, 1951
4. Mesasippus divergens (Bey-Bienko, 1930)
5. Mesasippus fuscovittatus (Tarbinsky, 1927)
6. Mesasippus geophilus (Bey-Bienko, 1930)
7. Mesasippus kozhevnikovi (Tarbinsky, 1925) - type species (as Chorthippus kozhevnikovi Tarbinsky = M. kozhevnikovi kozhevnikovi, the nominate subspecies out of 3)
8. Mesasippus nudus (Umnov, 1931)
9. Mesasippus scitus Mistshenko, 1951
10. Mesasippus tarbagataicus Sergeev & Bugrov, 1988
