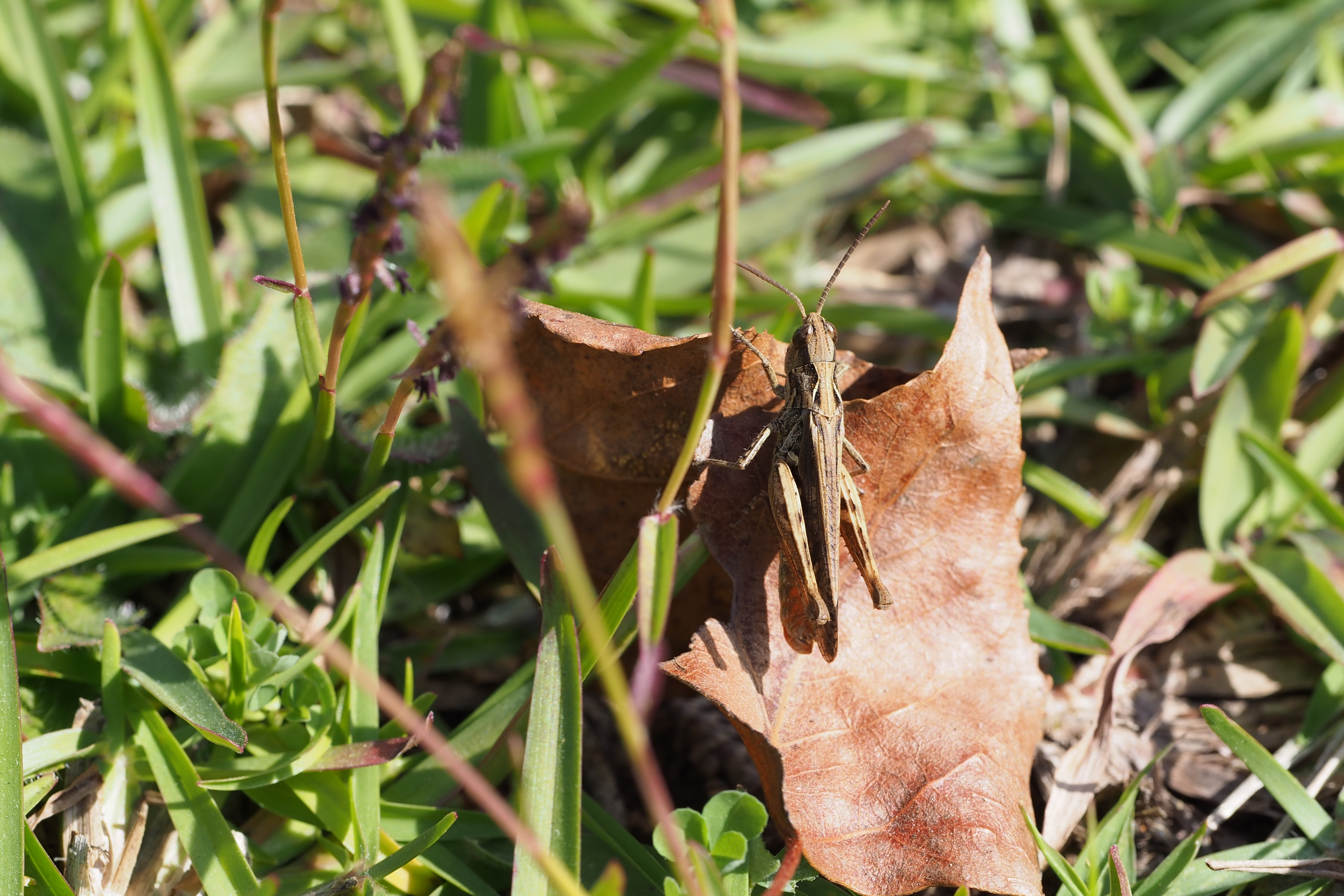
- Chorthippus maritimus, Japan

Scientific classification
- Kingdom: Animalia
- Phylum: Arthropoda
- Clade: Pancrustacea
- Class: Insecta
- Order: Orthoptera
- Suborder: Caelifera
- Family: Acrididae
- Subfamily: Gomphocerinae
- Tribe: Gomphocerini
- Genus: Chorthippus
- Species: C. maritimus

Binomial name
- Chorthippus maritimus Mistshenko, 1951

= Chorthippus maritimus =

Species of grasshopper

Chorthippus maritimus is a species of slant-faced grasshopper in the family Acrididae. It is found in Asia.

== Subspecies ==
These subspecies belong to the species Chorthippus maritimus:

- Chorthippus maritimus huabeiensis Xia & Jin, 1982
- Chorthippus maritimus insularis (Storozhenko, 2002)
- Chorthippus maritimus jacutus (Storozhenko, 2002)
- Chorthippus maritimus karakalensis Sychev & Woznessenskij, 1995
- Chorthippus maritimus maritimus Mistshenko, 1951
- Chorthippus maritimus saitorum (Ishikawa, 2002)
