= Chorthippus pullus =

- Close-uUp of a Chorthippus pullus

Scientific classification
- Kingdom: Animalia
- Phylum: Arthropoda
- Clade: Pancrustacea
- Class: Insecta
- Order: Orthoptera
- Suborder: Caelifera
- Family: Acrididae
- Genus: Chorthippus
- Species: C. pullus

Binomial name
- Chorthippus pullus (Philippi, 1830)

Audio
- Song

Species of grasshopper

Chorthippus pullus is a species belonging to the family Acrididae, subfamily Gomphocerinae. It is found across much of Europe
