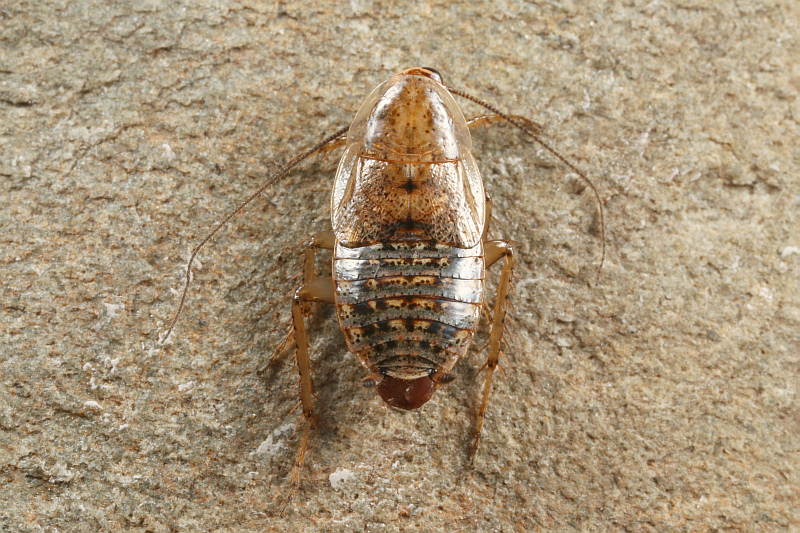
- Capraiellus panzeri

Scientific classification
- Kingdom: Animalia
- Phylum: Arthropoda
- Clade: Pancrustacea
- Class: Insecta
- Order: Blattodea
- Family: Ectobiidae
- Subfamily: Ectobiinae
- Genus: Capraiellus; Harz, 1976

= Capraiellus =

Genus of cockroaches

Capraiellus is a genus of European, non-cosmopolitan cockroaches in the family Ectobiidae.

== Species ==
The Cockroach Species File describes the following:

1. Capraiellus panzeri (Stephens, 1835) - type species
  - synonym Ectobius panzeri nigripes Fernandes, 1962
2. Capraiellus tamaninii (Galvagni, 1972)

Note: Capraiellus haeckelii (Bolívar, 1876) (synonym Ectobius panzeri servillei Fernandes, 1962) is a nomen dubium.
