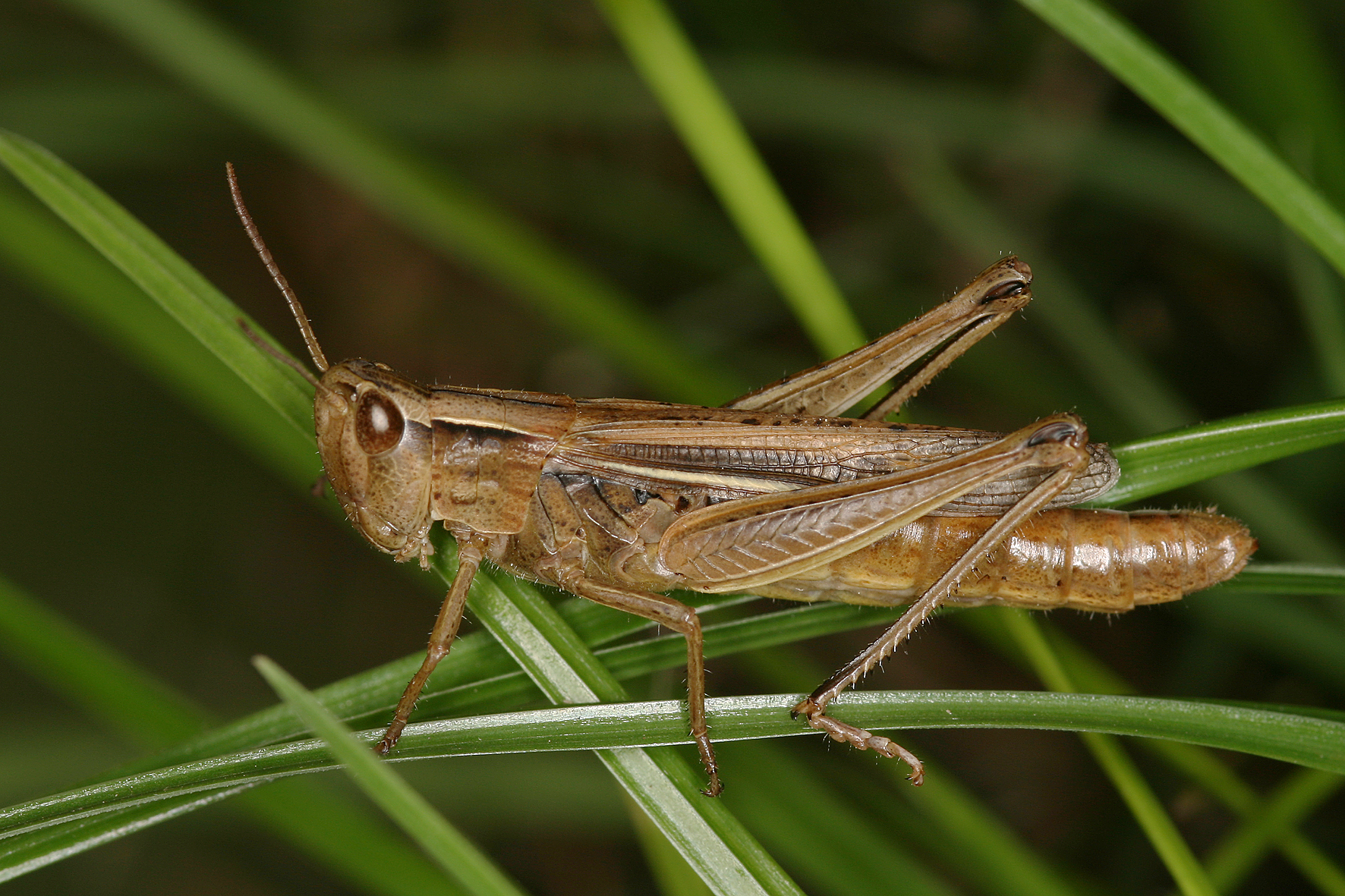

Conservation status
- Least Concern (IUCN 3.1)

Scientific classification
- Kingdom: Animalia
- Phylum: Arthropoda
- Class: Insecta
- Order: Orthoptera
- Suborder: Caelifera
- Family: Acrididae
- Genus: Chorthippus
- Species: C. oschei

Binomial name
- Chorthippus oschei Vedenina & Helversen, 2009
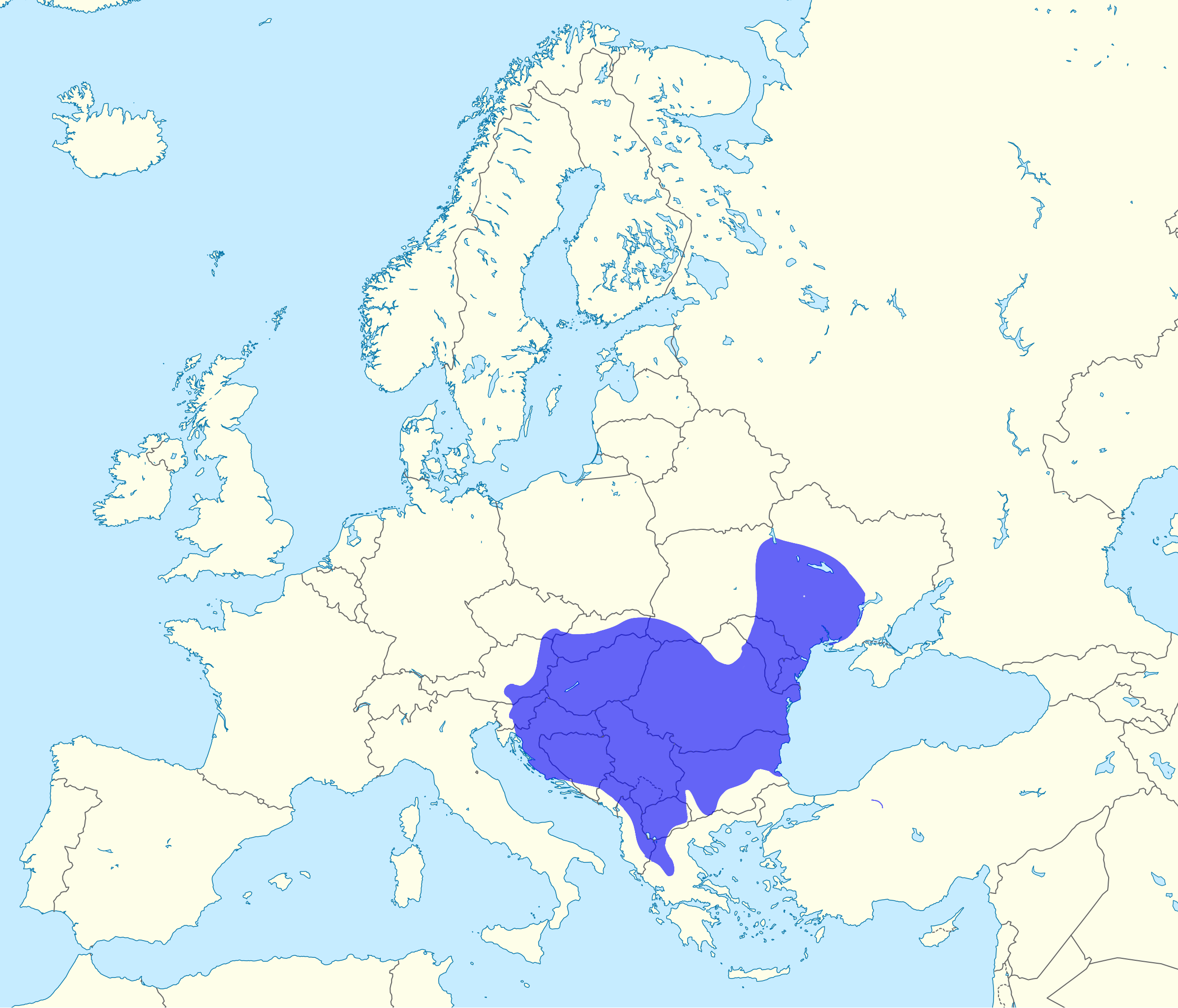

= Chorthippus oschei =

Species of grasshopper

Chorthippus oschei, also known as the Carpathian dancing grasshopper, is a grasshopper native to Europe.

== Subspecies ==
- Chorthippus oschei oschei (Vedenina & Helversen, 2009)
- Chorthippus oschei pusztaensis (Vedenina, 2009)

== Distribution ==
It is found across Europe in countries like Ukraine, Moldova, Romania, Bulgaria, North Macedonia, Greece, Albania, Montenegro, Serbia, Bosnia and Hercegovina, Croatia, Slovenia, Austria, Hungary, Slovakia and Czech Republic.
