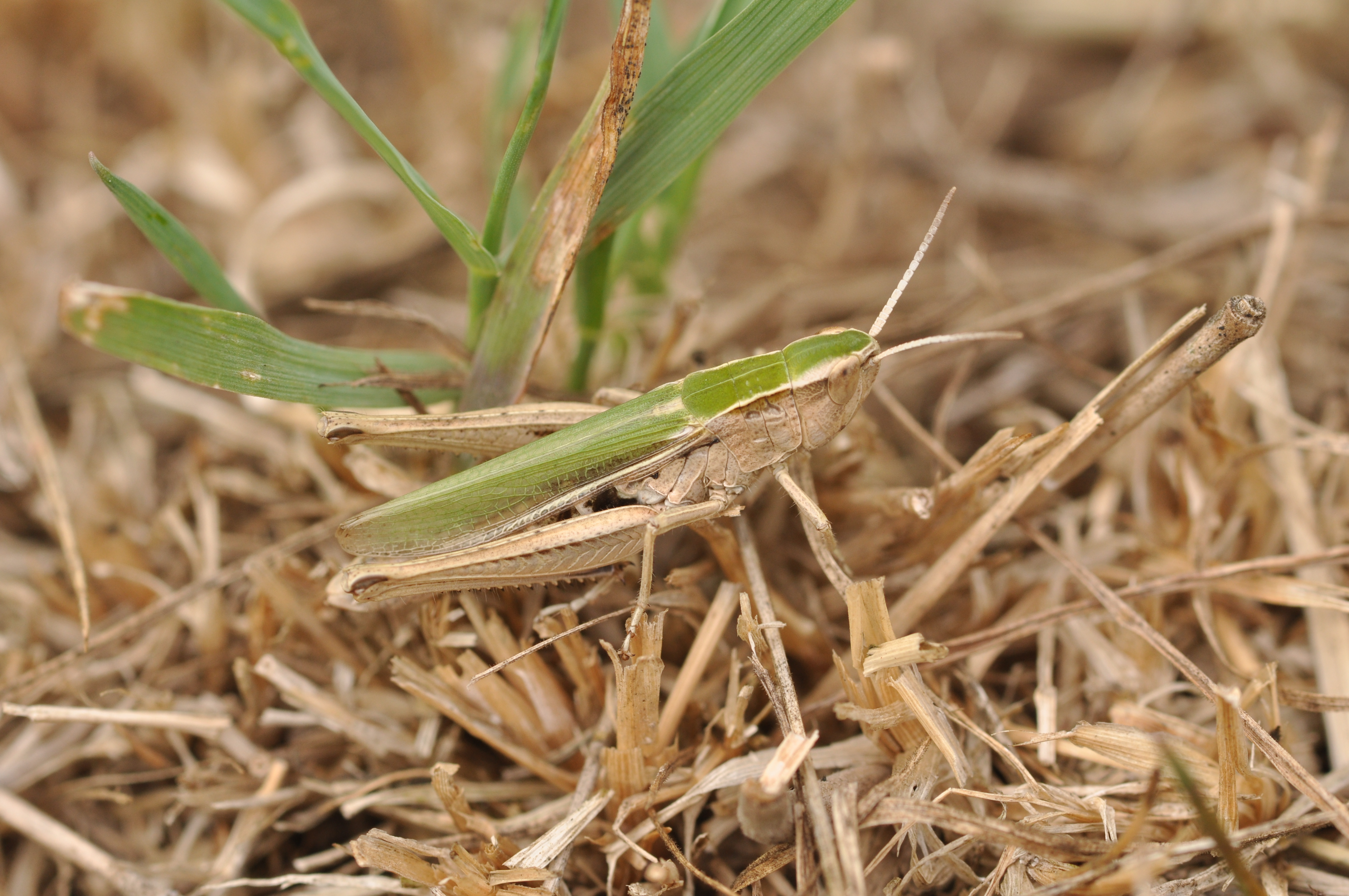
- Female showing white wing stripe

Scientific classification
- Domain: Eukaryota
- Kingdom: Animalia
- Phylum: Arthropoda
- Class: Insecta
- Order: Orthoptera
- Suborder: Caelifera
- Family: Acrididae
- Genus: Chorthippus
- Species: C. albomarginatus

Binomial name
- Chorthippus albomarginatus (De Geer, 1773)

= Chorthippus albomarginatus =

Species of grasshopper

Chorthippus albomarginatus typical stridulation
Typical song of Chorthippus albomarginatus from a field recording, 9.7s

Sound of Chorthippus albomarginatus
Field recording in the Netherlands, 45s

Chorthippus albomarginatus stridulation
Song of Chorthippus albomarginatus from a lab recording, 7min 46s

Close-Up of a Chorthippus albomarginatus

Chorthippus albomarginatus, the lesser marsh grasshopper, is a common grasshopper of European grassland both damp-marshy and (despite its name) dry, including salt-marsh and coastal habitats.

== Distribution ==
The range of the lesser marsh grasshopper extends from Finland and southern Scandinavia in the north to Spain and Italy in the south. It was once present only in the southern parts of the UK but has been expanding its range northwards.

== Physical appearance ==
Females grow to approximately 20 millimetres (0.8 in) and are larger than males which grow to approximately 15 mm (0.6 in). The female almost always has a longitudinal white stripe on the wing whereas the male rarely does.

The region behind the head is referred to as the "pronotal side-keels" and the bars are approximately parallel in this species. Although quite similar, it can be distinguished from the meadow grasshopper Chorthippus parallelus, which also has straight pronotal side-keels, by several characteristics. These include its ability to fly, a white stripe on the female's wing, and a more pointed snout. It often tends to be less brightly coloured and more straw-brown than Chorthippus parallelus.

Both sexes can be extremely variable in colour from green to brown.

== Song and reproduction ==
The song is very similar to Chorthippus brunneus, though perhaps a little slower, with 2–6 chirps each lasting approximately half a second. There can be an 'alternation song' between competing males. Females lay eggs at the base of grass blades.

== Development ==
More rapid development of C. albomarginatus (maturation at a younger age) was found to be associated with higher DNA damage. The association of increased DNA damage with shorter developmental times suggests that there is a trade-off between genetic integrity and growth rate. Although rapid growth would likely provide a fitness advantage, the increased production of reactive oxygen species associated with rapid development would probably make the individual more subject to oxidative DNA damage with negative consequences later in life.
