= Gomphoceridius =

Scientific classification
- Domain: Eukaryota
- Kingdom: Animalia
- Phylum: Arthropoda
- Class: Insecta
- Order: Orthoptera
- Suborder: Caelifera
- Family: Acrididae
- Genus: Gomphoceridius; Bolívar, 1914
- Species: G. brevipennis

Binomial name
- Gomphoceridius brevipennis (Brisout de Barneville, 1858)

Synonyms
- Acridium brevipennis Brisout de Barneville, 1858; Chorthippus brevipennis (Brisout de Barneville, 1858); Gomphocerus brevipennis (Brisout de Barneville, 1858); Gomphocerippus brevipennis (Brisout de Barneville, 1858)

Genus of grasshoppers

Gomphoceridius is a monotypic genus of grasshoppers containing the species Gomphoceridius brevipennis and placed in the subfamily Gomphocerinae, tribe Gomphocerini.

The species is found in western, mainland Europe, with a notable populations in the Pyrenees.
