= Chorthippus bozdaghi =

Conservation status
- Critically Endangered (IUCN 3.1)

Scientific classification
- Kingdom: Animalia
- Phylum: Arthropoda
- Class: Insecta
- Order: Orthoptera
- Suborder: Caelifera
- Family: Acrididae
- Genus: Chorthippus
- Species: C. bozdaghi

Binomial name
- Chorthippus bozdaghi Uvarov, 1934

Species of grasshopper

Chorthippus bozdaghi, commonly known as the Bozdagh grasshopper, is a critically endangered species of grasshopper endemic to the Bozdağ Mountains of western Turkey.

== Taxonomy and history ==
Chorthippus bozdaghi was described by Boris Uvarov in 1934 alongside Chorthippus ilkazi, another Turkish endemic which he considered closely related to C. bozadaghi. The holotype specimen was an adult male collected in 1931 by Uvarov himself from the Bozdağ Mountains. In 1975 it was placed in the Chorthippus subgenus Glyptobothrus.

== Distribution and habitat ==
Chorthippus bozdaghi is known only from the subalpine zone of the Bozdağ Mountains of İzmir Province in western Anatolia, Turkey. It occurs in moist shrubland at altitudes of 1,490–1,770 m (4,890–5,810 ft). The associated plant community of this habitat includes Astragalus flavescens, Astragalus pungens, Asyneuma limonifolium, Bromus tomentellus, Festuca valesiaca, Osyris alba, and Vincetoxicum tmoleum.

== Conservation status ==
Chorthippus bozdaghi is listed as critically endangered on the International Union for the Conservation of Nature Red List under criteria B1ab(i,ii,iii) and B2ab(i,ii,iii), based on its small, isolated range and damaged habitat. The population appears to be decreasing, have retreated further up the mountain over time. It is threatened by afforestation, agriculture, climate change, and the conversion of its habitat into arable land.
