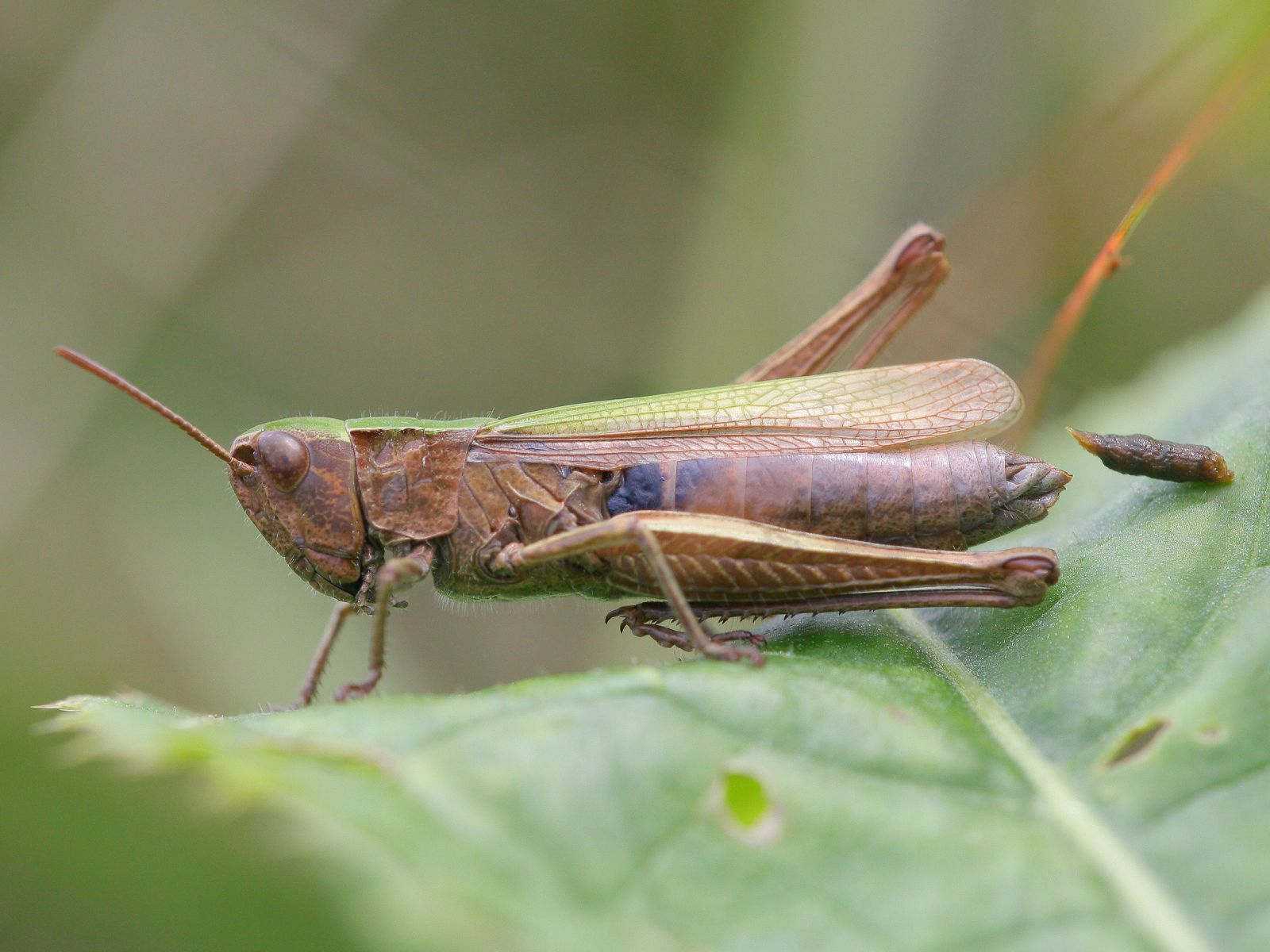
- Chorthippus dorsatus female Germany

Scientific classification
- Kingdom: Animalia
- Phylum: Arthropoda
- Clade: Pancrustacea
- Class: Insecta
- Order: Orthoptera
- Suborder: Caelifera
- Family: Acrididae
- Genus: Chorthippus
- Species: C. dorsatus

Binomial name
- Chorthippus dorsatus (Zetterstedt, 1821)

Audio
- Song

= Chorthippus dorsatus =

Species of grasshopper

Chorthippus dorsatus is a species belonging to the family Acrididae, subfamily Gomphocerinae. It is found across the Palearctic. The species lives in Central Europe usually at altitudes 500–800 meters, in Switzerland it rises to 1800, in Bulgaria also over 2200 meters. Humid to moist meadows are preferred, especially around moors, but the species is also found on moderately dry meadows. Heavily agricultural or fertilized meadows are avoided.

Close-up of a Chorthippus dorsatus
