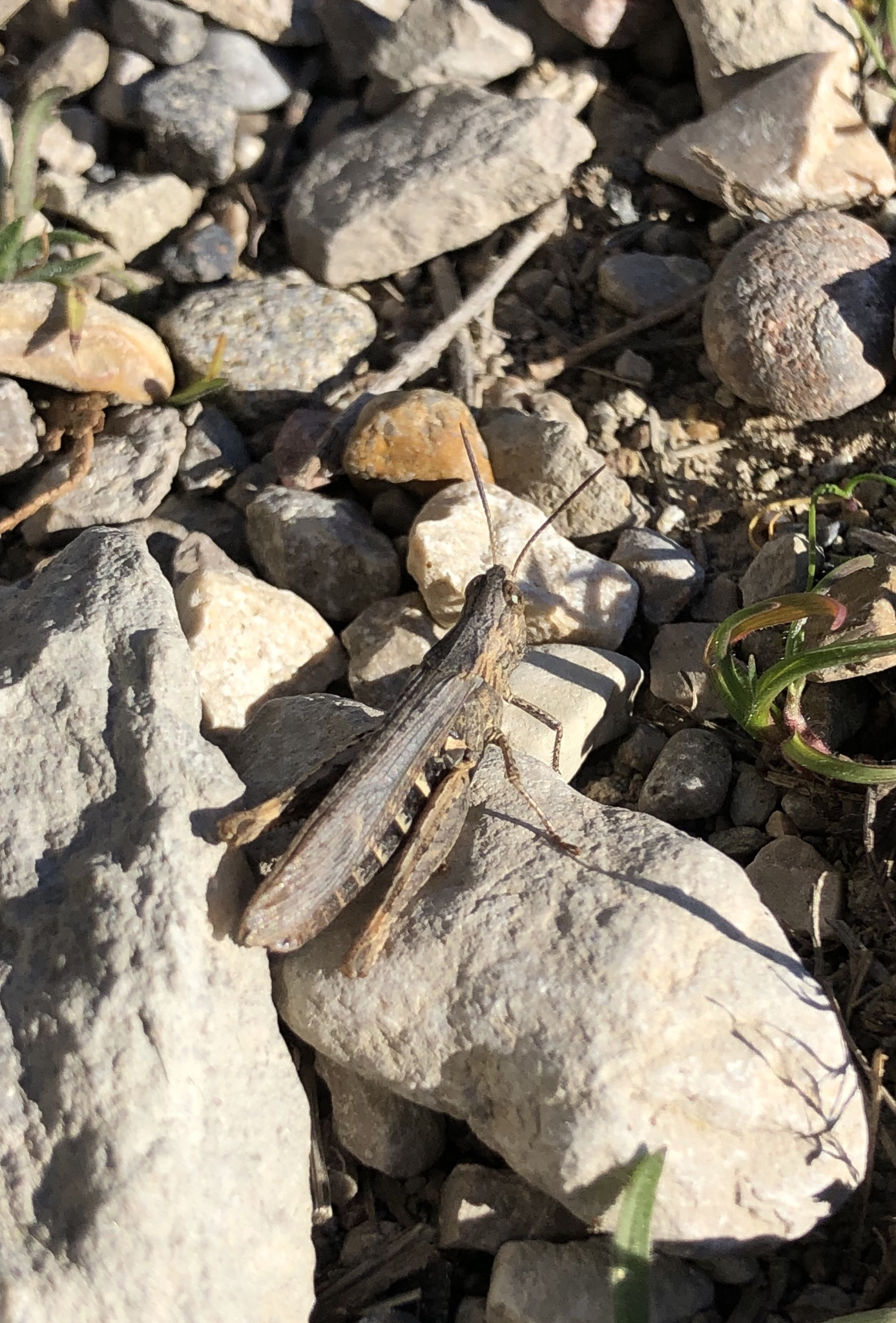
- Chorthippus jacobsi, Iberian field grasshopper, Spain

Conservation status
- Least Concern (IUCN 3.1)

Scientific classification
- Kingdom: Animalia
- Phylum: Arthropoda
- Clade: Pancrustacea
- Class: Insecta
- Order: Orthoptera
- Suborder: Caelifera
- Family: Acrididae
- Genus: Chorthippus
- Species: C. jacobsi

Binomial name
- Chorthippus jacobsi Harz, 1975

= Chorthippus jacobsi =

Species of grasshopper

Chorthippus jacobsi, the Iberian field grasshopper, is a species of slant-faced grasshopper in the family Acrididae. It is found on the Iberian Peninsula.

The IUCN conservation status of Chorthippus jacobsi is "LC", least concern, with no immediate threat to the species' survival. The IUCN status was assessed in 2016.
