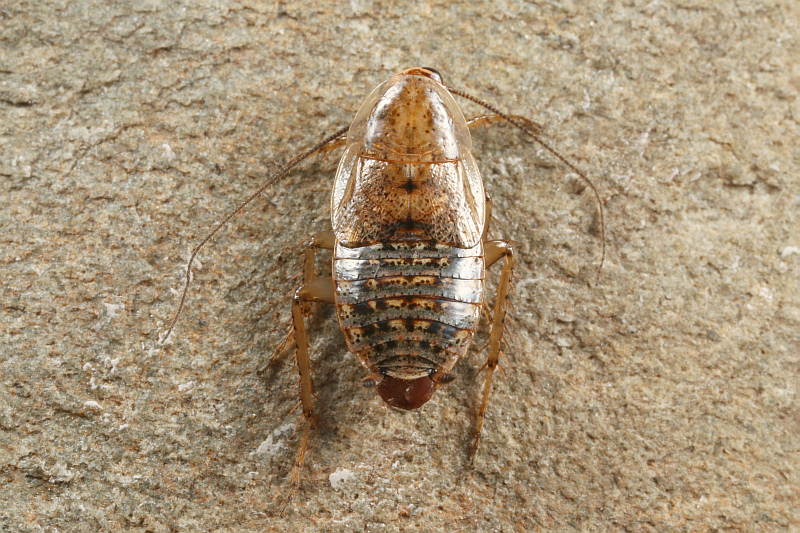

Scientific classification
- Kingdom: Animalia
- Phylum: Arthropoda
- Clade: Pancrustacea
- Class: Insecta
- Order: Blattodea
- Family: Ectobiidae
- Genus: Capraiellus
- Species: C. panzeri

Binomial name
- Capraiellus panzeri (Stephens, 1835)

Synonyms
- Blatta arenicola Fischer, 1853; Capraiellus haeckelii (Bolívar, 1876); Ectobius ericetorum Wesmaël, 1838; Ectobius nigripes Stephens, 1835; Ectobius panzeri nigripes Fernandes, 1962

= Capraiellus panzeri =

Species of cockroach

Capraiellus panzeri is a species of non-cosmopolitan cockroach in the subfamily Ectobiinae: commonly known by its original (genus) name Ectobius panzeri.

This European species extends into NW Africa and is localised in southern Britain, where it may be called the lesser cockroach. Recent work indicated that Ectobius panzeri panzeri (i.e. as found in Britain) should be placed in the genus Capraiellus and this has now been confirmed.

== See also ==
- List of Orthoptera and allied insects of Great Britain
