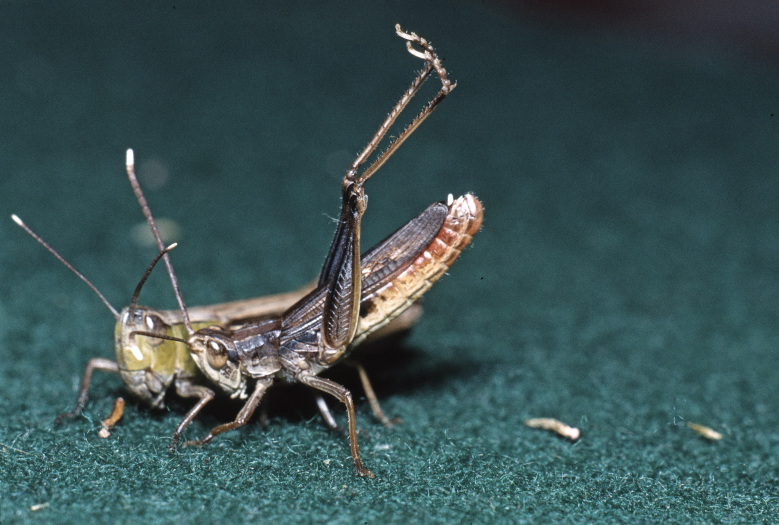

Conservation status
- Endangered (IUCN 3.1)

Scientific classification
- Kingdom: Animalia
- Phylum: Arthropoda
- Clade: Pancrustacea
- Class: Insecta
- Order: Orthoptera
- Suborder: Caelifera
- Family: Acrididae
- Genus: Chorthippus
- Species: C. lacustris

Binomial name
- Chorthippus lacustris (Thunberg, 1815)

= Chorthippus lacustris =

Epirus dancing grasshopper

Species of grasshopper

Chorthippus lacustris, the Epirus dancing grasshopper, is a species of grasshopper belonging to the genus Chorthippus. This species is native to northwest Greece and is endangered.

== Habitat ==
This species lives in wet temporary grasslands and needs high soil humidity. The Epirus dancing grasshopper's habitat is currently threatened mainly by the urbanization of northwest Greece. Only five populations of this species remain in the world.

== Conservation ==
The Epirus dancing grasshopper is currently listed as endangered on the IUCN red list and is on the verge of extinction. There are five remnant known populations. Deforestation and urbanization has caused this species to create habitat fragmentation which makes it difficult for separate populations to reproduce with each other. These species are particularly vulnerable to habitat loss due to their narrow ecological niche. Drainage, intensive cattle grazing and land conversion to agricultural fields are other threats the grasshopper faces. As of 2016, it lived in three protected areas of the Natura 2000 network in Epirus; no conservation efforts were being made to protect the species there.

== Bibliography ==
- Center for International Forestry Research (CIFOR) (2014). Learning our Lessons: A Review of Alternative Livelihood Projects in Central Africa (Report). Center for International Forestry Research. doi:10.17528/cifor/data.00083.
- "species Chorthippus (Chorthippus) lacustris La Greca & Messina, 1975: Orthoptera Species File". orthoptera.speciesfile.org.
- Stefanidis, Apostolos (December 2022). "Saving the last dance: conservation actions for the Epirus grasshopper Chorthippus lacustris".
- Hochkirch, Axel (2020). "Grasshopper conservation in Europe" (PDF). The Third European Congress of Orthoptera Conservation in Leiden, the Netherlands: 95 – via R & R Felix.
