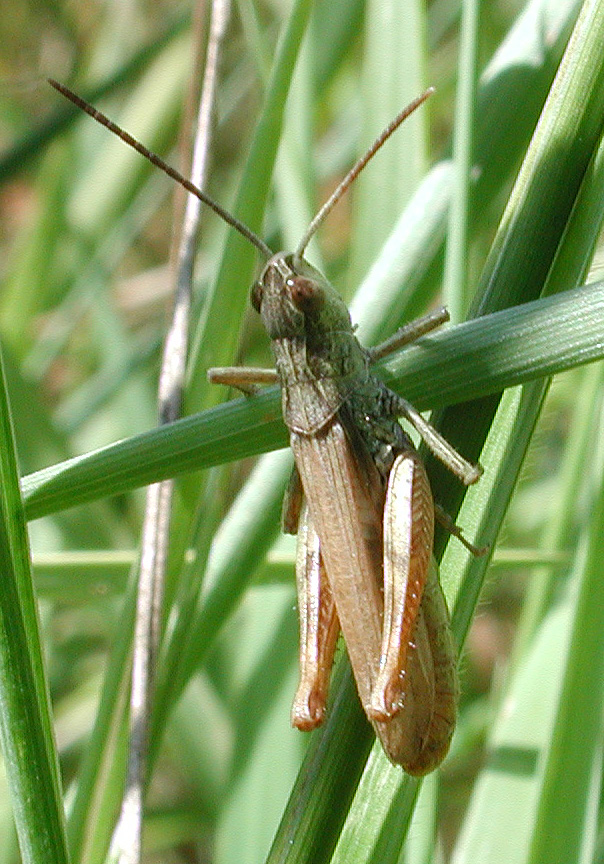
- Chorthippus apricarius male Germany

Scientific classification
- Kingdom: Animalia
- Phylum: Arthropoda
- Clade: Pancrustacea
- Class: Insecta
- Order: Orthoptera
- Suborder: Caelifera
- Family: Acrididae
- Genus: Chorthippus
- Species: C. apricarius

Binomial name
- Chorthippus apricarius (Linnaeus, 1758)

Audio
- Song

= Chorthippus apricarius =

Species of grasshopper

Close-up of a Chorthippus apricarius

Chorthippus apricarius is a species of grasshopper in the subfamily Gomphocerinae. It is found across most of Europe.
