= Bruneria =

Scientific classification
- Kingdom: Animalia
- Phylum: Arthropoda
- Class: Insecta
- Order: Orthoptera
- Suborder: Caelifera
- Family: Acrididae
- Subfamily: Gomphocerinae
- Tribe: Gomphocerini
- Genus: Bruneria; McNeill, 1897

Genus of grasshoppers

Bruneria is a genus of slant-faced grasshoppers, in the subfamily Gomphocerinae, from north-western America. There are at least three described species in Bruneria.

== Species ==
These three species belong to the genus Bruneria:

- Bruneria brunnea (Thomas, 1871) (bruner slant-faced grasshopper)
- Bruneria shastana (Scudder, 1881) (Shasta slant-faced grasshopper)
- Bruneria yukonensis Vickery, 1969 (Yukon slant-faced grasshopper)
