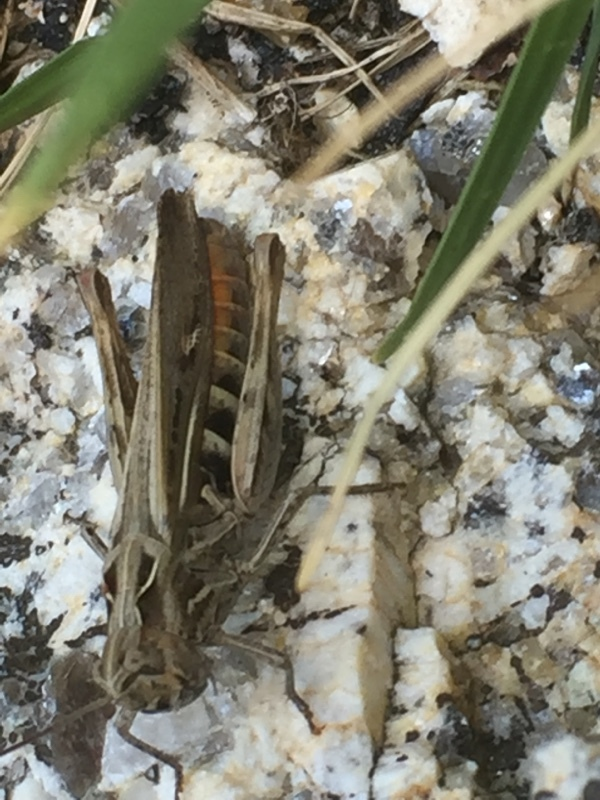
- Chorthippus yersini, Yersin's Grasshopper, Portugal

Conservation status
- Least Concern (IUCN 3.1)

Scientific classification
- Kingdom: Animalia
- Phylum: Arthropoda
- Clade: Pancrustacea
- Class: Insecta
- Order: Orthoptera
- Suborder: Caelifera
- Family: Acrididae
- Genus: Chorthippus
- Species: C. yersini

Binomial name
- Chorthippus yersini Harz, 1975

= Chorthippus yersini =

Species of grasshopper

Chorthippus yersini, or Yersin's grasshopper, is a species of slant-faced grasshopper in the family Acrididae. It is found on the Iberian Peninsula.

The IUCN conservation status of Chorthippus yersini is "LC", least concern, with no immediate threat to the species' survival. The IUCN status was assessed in 2016.
