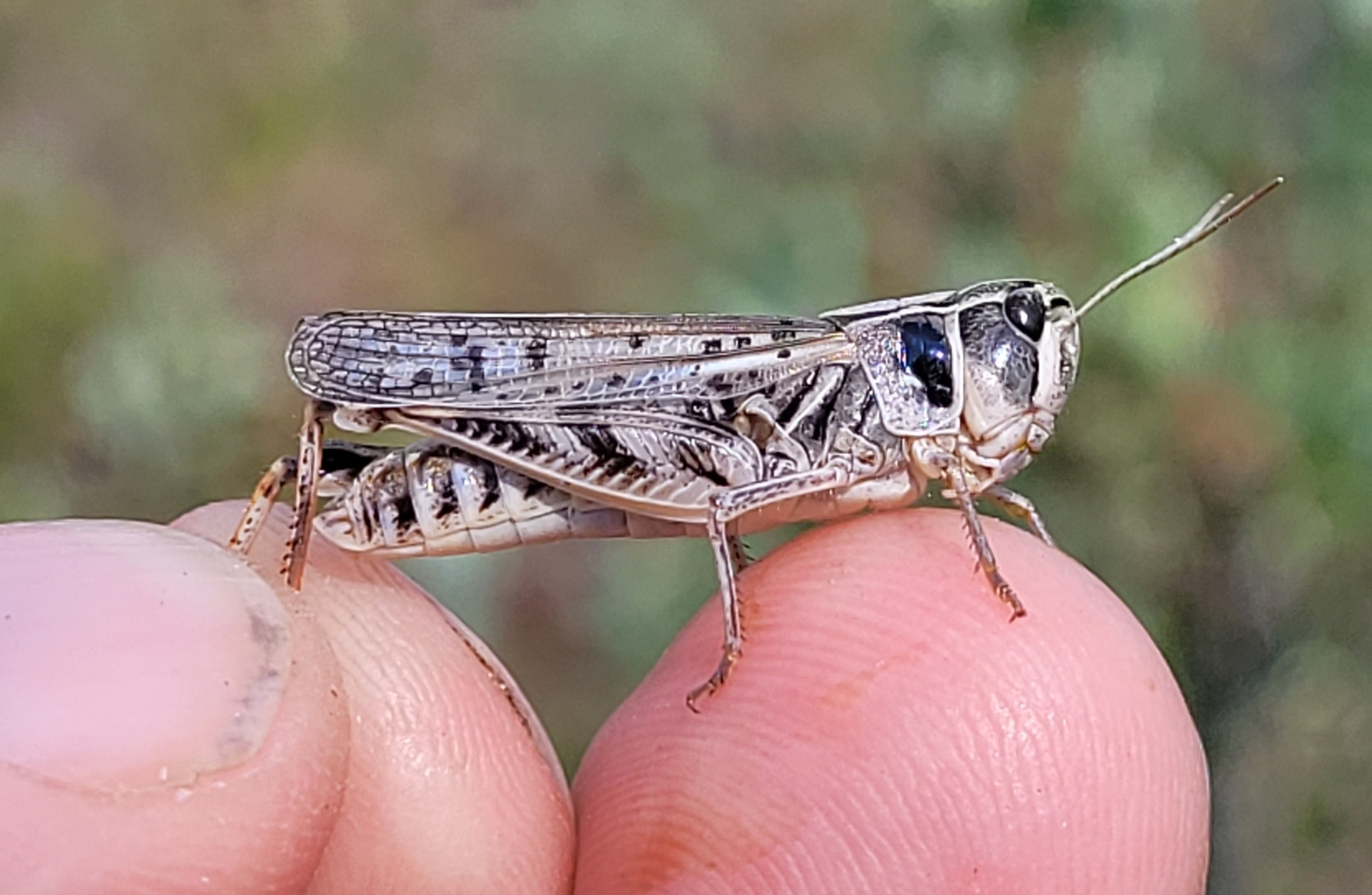
- At Dillberry Lake Provincial Park

Scientific classification
- Kingdom: Animalia
- Phylum: Arthropoda
- Clade: Pancrustacea
- Class: Insecta
- Order: Orthoptera
- Suborder: Caelifera
- Family: Acrididae
- Genus: Bruneria
- Species: B. brunnea

Binomial name
- Bruneria brunnea (Thomas, 1871)

= Bruneria brunnea =

Species of grasshopper

Bruneria brunnea, the bruner slant-faced grasshopper, is a species of slant-faced grasshopper in the family Acrididae. It is found in North America.
