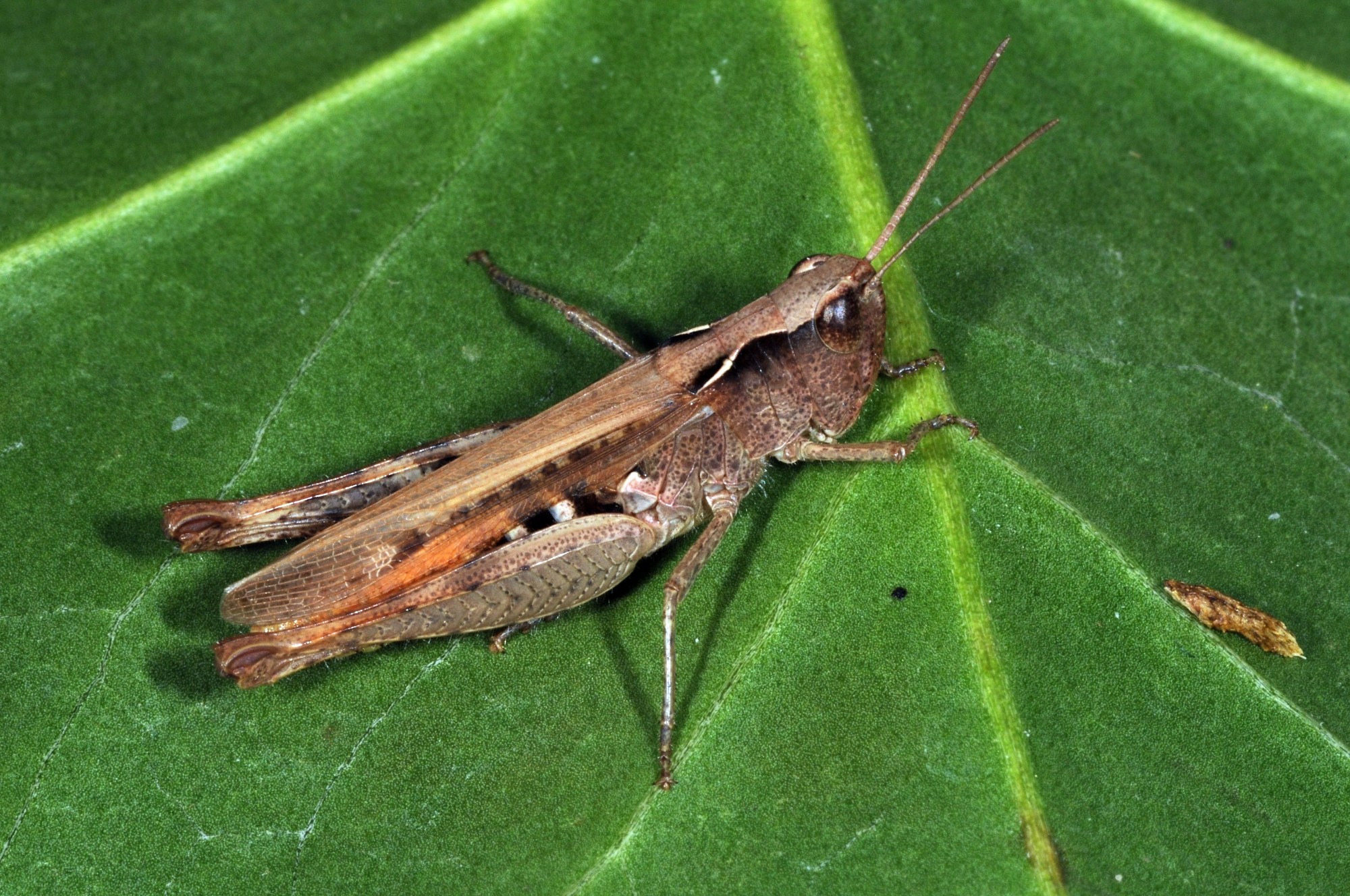
- Chorthippus vagans male Germany

Scientific classification
- Domain: Eukaryota
- Kingdom: Animalia
- Phylum: Arthropoda
- Class: Insecta
- Order: Orthoptera
- Suborder: Caelifera
- Family: Acrididae
- Genus: Chorthippus
- Species: C. vagans

Binomial name
- Chorthippus vagans (Eversmann, 1848)

= Chorthippus vagans =

Species of grasshopper

Chorthippus vagans, which may be called the heath grasshopper or steppe grasshopper, is a species of grasshopper belonging to the subfamily Gomphocerinae. It is found across the Palearctic through Russia and Kazakhstan, east to Siberia, and north to Denmark. It is rare in the British Isles.

In Central Europe they are usually found at altitudes of 300 to 600 m (980 to 1,970 ft). In the French Calcareous Alps, the species is found on Mont Ventoux up to an altitude of 1,900 m (6,200 ft). The steppe grasshopper lives in warm and dry habitats with sparse, low vegetation.

Close-Up of a Chorthippus vagans
