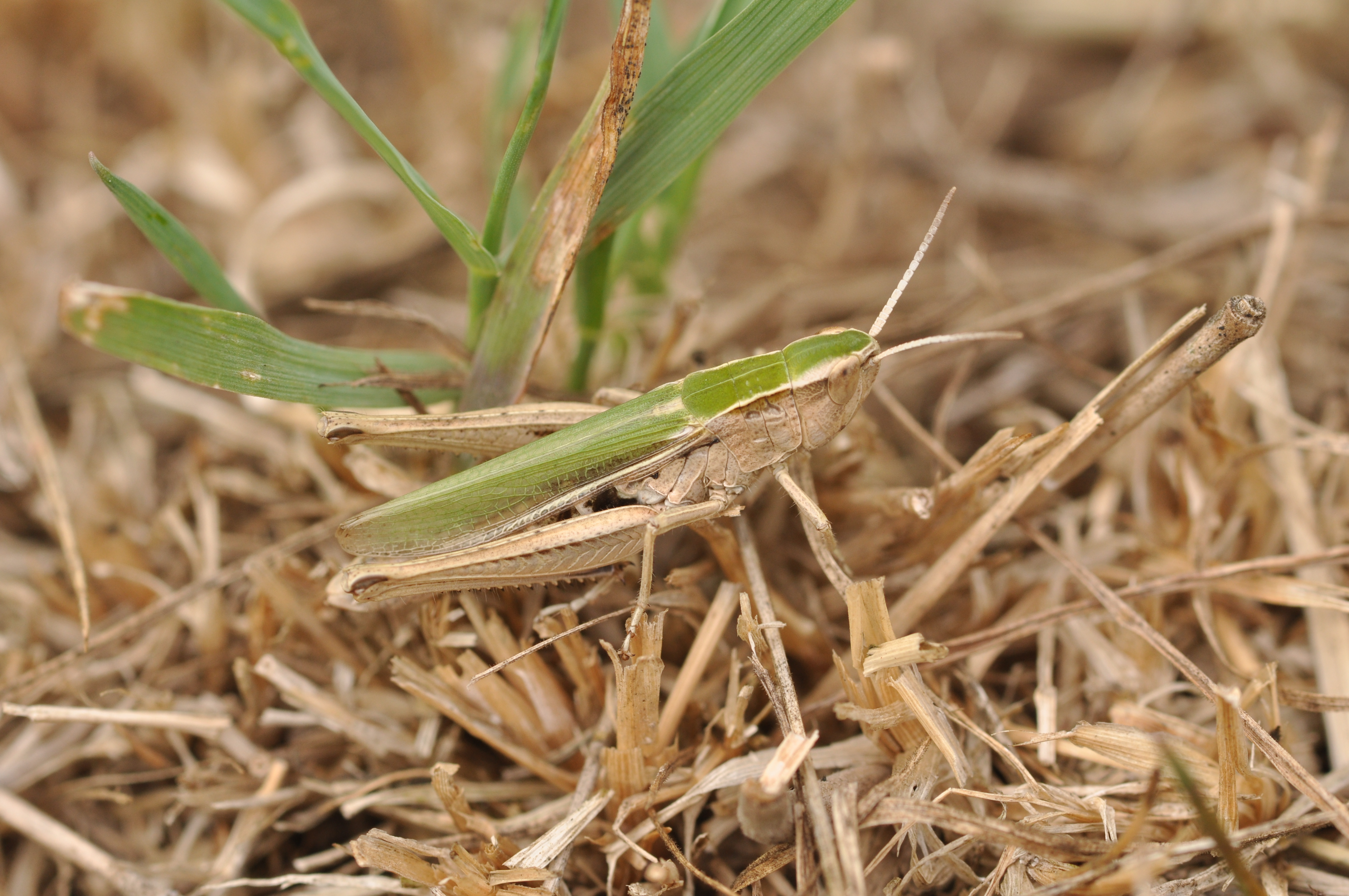
- Chorthippus albomarginatus

Scientific classification
- Kingdom: Animalia
- Phylum: Arthropoda
- Clade: Pancrustacea
- Class: Insecta
- Order: Orthoptera
- Suborder: Caelifera
- Family: Acrididae
- Subfamily: Gomphocerinae
- Tribe: Gomphocerini
- Genus: Chorthippus; Fieber, 1852

Subgenera
- Altichorthippus Jago, 1971; Chorthippus Fieber, 1852; Glyptobothrus Chopard, 1951

Diversity
- about 230 species

= Chorthippus =

Genus of grasshoppers

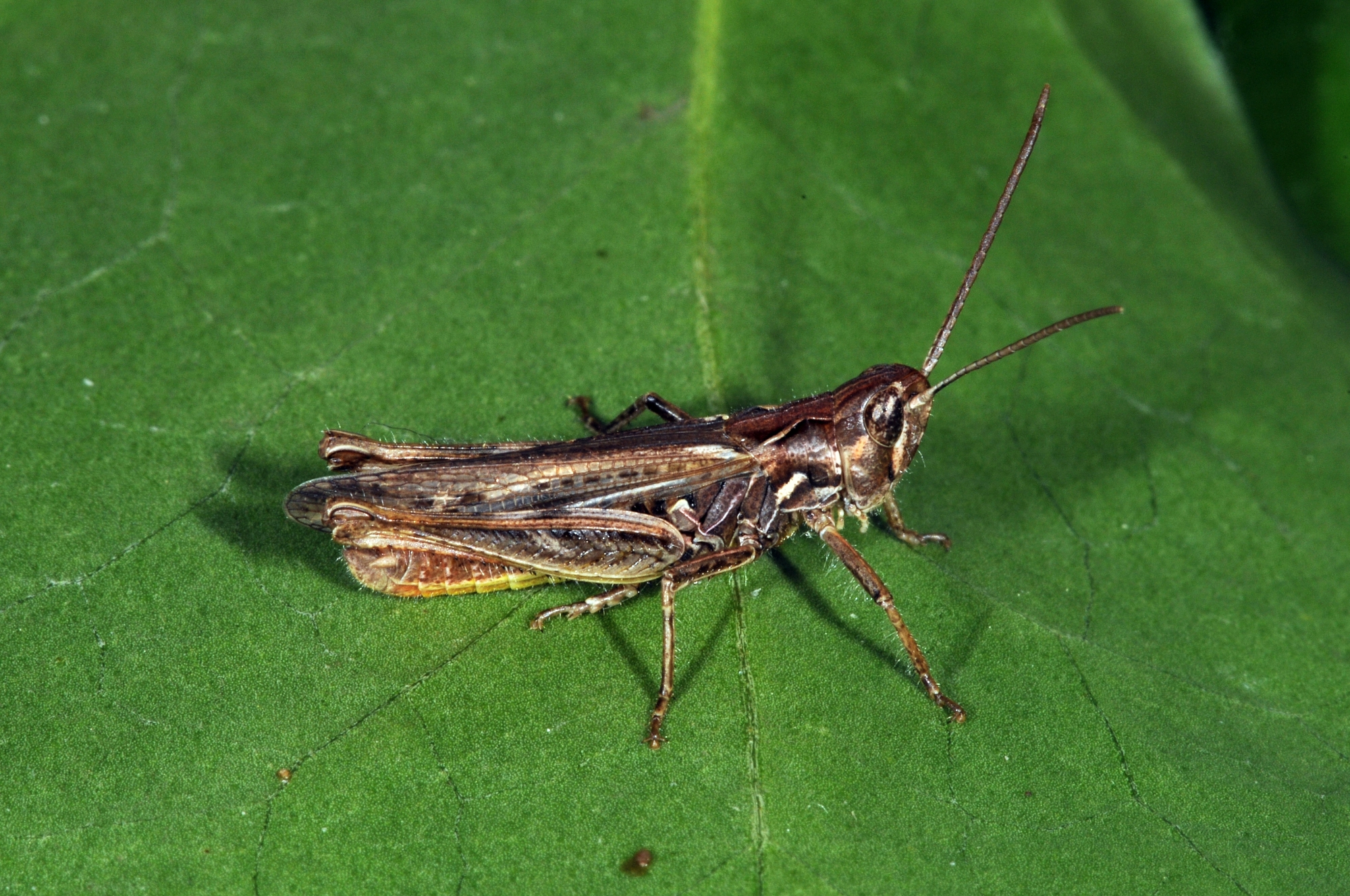
Chorthippus mollus, Germany

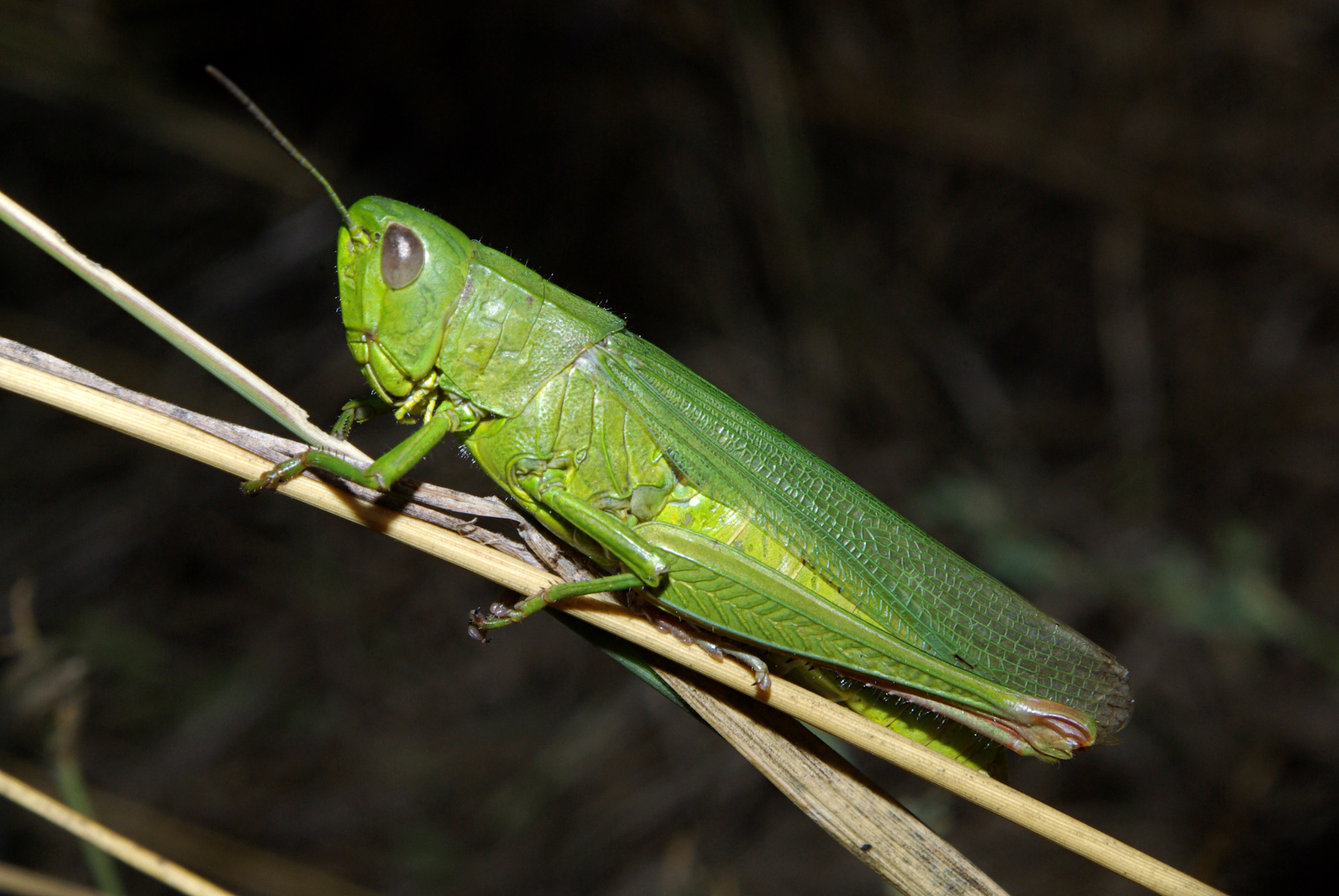
Chorthippus jucundus, Spain

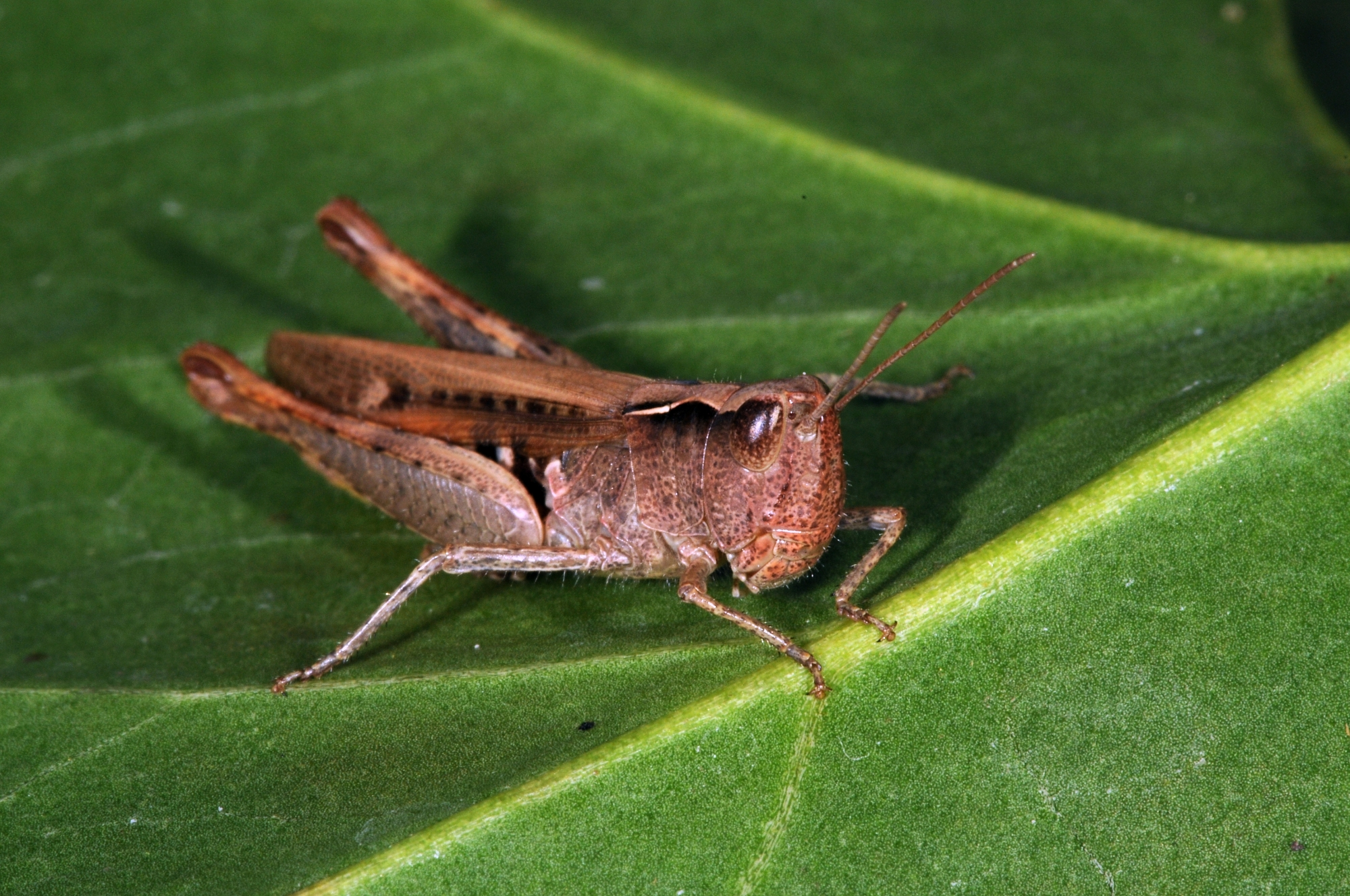
Chorthippus vagans, Germany

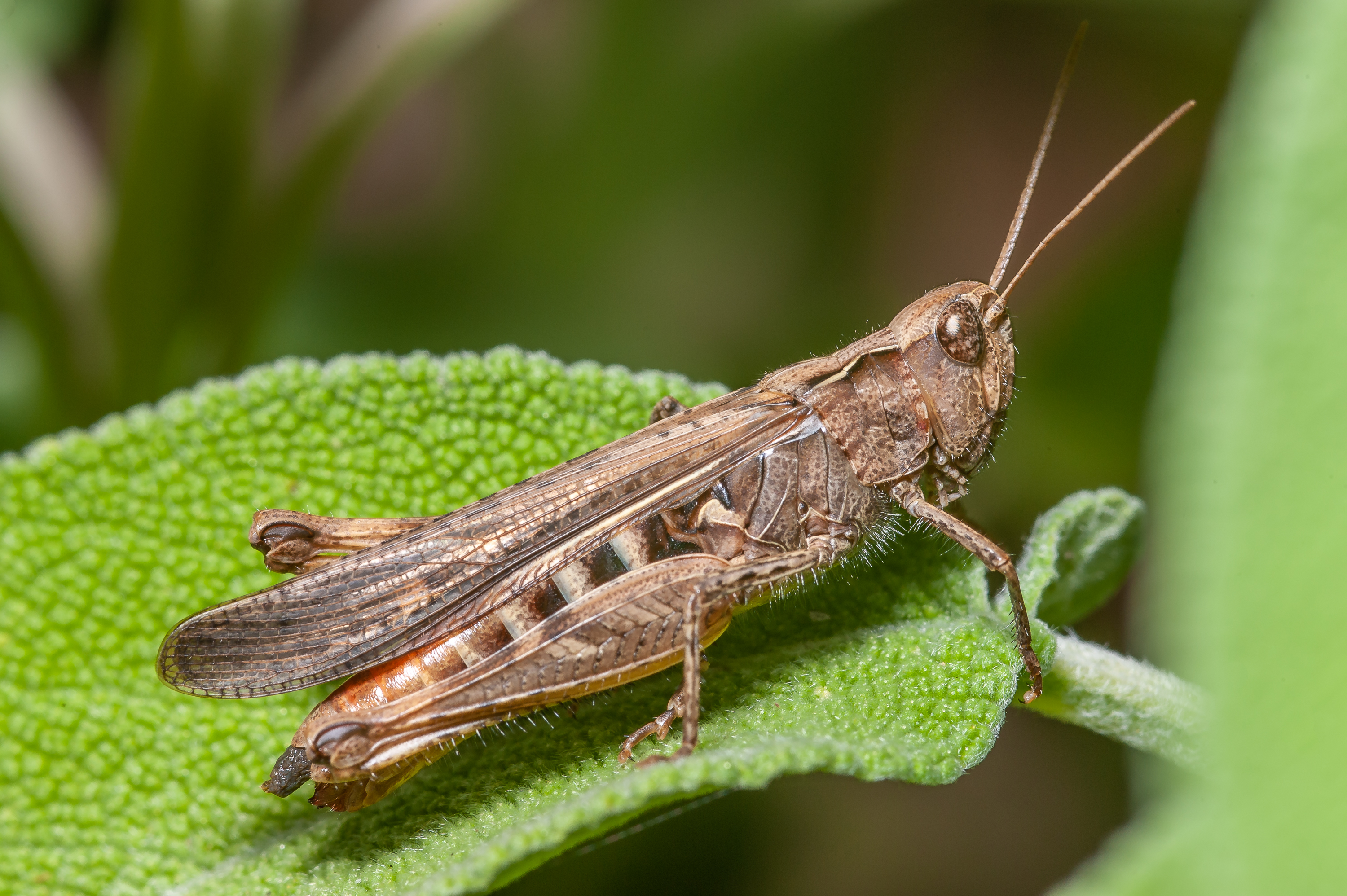
Chorthippus brunneus

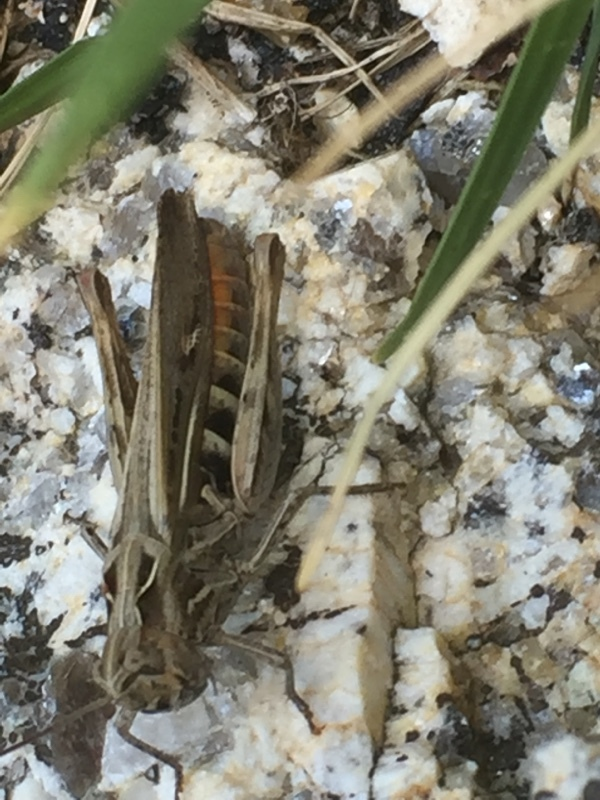
Chorthippus yersini, Yersin's grasshopper, Portugal

Chorthippus is a large genus of gomphocerine grasshoppers with around 230 described species mostly found in the Palaearctic realm. It was erected by Franz Fieber in 1852.

The genus has been subdivided into subgenera including: Altichorthippus, Chorthippus and Glyptobothrus, with other species not placed. It contains a number of morphologically very similar cryptic species: listed as superspecies or species groups, for example the Chorthippus biguttulus group which contains the common field grasshopper; in mainland Eurasia the various species are most easily distinguished by their song patterns.

== Species ==
The Orthoptera Species File includes:

1. Chorthippus abchasicus Ramme, 1939
2. Chorthippus acroleucus (Müller, 1924) (white-tipped grasshopper)
3. Chorthippus aktaci Ünal, 2010
4. Chorthippus albomarginatus (De Geer, 1773) (lesser marsh grasshopper) type species (as Acrydium albomarginatum De Geer = C. albomarginatus albomarginatus)
5. Chorthippus albonemus Zheng & Tu, 1964
6. Chorthippus almoranus Uvarov, 1942
7. Chorthippus alticola Ramme, 1921 (alpine grasshopper)
8. Chorthippus alxaensis Zheng, 2000
9. Chorthippus amplilineatus Ma & Guo, 1995
10. Chorthippus amplimedilocus Zheng & Yang, 1997
11. Chorthippus amplintersitus Liu, 1981
12. Chorthippus angulatus Tarbinsky, 1927
13. Chorthippus antecessor Sirin & Çiplak, 2010 (Adana grasshopper)
14. Chorthippus antennalis Umnov, 1931
15. Chorthippus apicalis (Herrich-Schäffer, 1840)
16. Chorthippus apricarius (Linnaeus, 1758) (locomotive grasshopper)
17. Chorthippus apricaroides Zheng & Ren, 2007
18. Chorthippus ariasi (Bolívar, 1908) (Sierra de Gredos grasshopper)
19. Chorthippus armoricanus (Defaut, 2015)
20. Chorthippus aroliumulus Xia & Jin, 1982
21. Chorthippus atlasi Defaut, 1987
22. Chorthippus atridorsus Jia & Liang, 1993
23. Chorthippus badachshani Bey-Bienko, 1963
24. Chorthippus badius Mistshenko, 1951
25. Chorthippus beianensis Zheng & Sun, 2007
26. Chorthippus bellus Zhang & Jin, 1985
27. Chorthippus biguttulus (Linnaeus, 1758) (bow-winged grasshopper)
28. Chorthippus bilineatus Zhang, 1984
29. Chorthippus binotatus (Charpentier, 1825) (red-legged grasshopper)
30. Chorthippus biroi (Kuthy, 1907) (Cretan grasshopper)
31. Chorthippus bornhalmi Harz, 1971 (Bornhalm's grasshopper)
32. Chorthippus bozdaghi Uvarov, 1934 (Bozdagh grasshopper)
33. Chorthippus brachypterus (Werner, 1932)
34. Chorthippus brevicornis Wang & Zheng, 1994
35. Chorthippus brevipterus Yin, 1984
36. Chorthippus brunneus (Thunberg, 1815) (common field grasshopper)
37. Chorthippus bucharicus Bey-Bienko, 1948
38. Chorthippus buerjinensis Wang & Zheng, 2010
39. Chorthippus burripes Zheng & Xin, 1999
40. Chorthippus caliginosus Mistshenko, 1951
41. Chorthippus caporiaccoi Salfi, 1934
42. Chorthippus cavilosus Mistshenko, 1951
43. Chorthippus cazurroi (Bolívar, 1898) (Cazurro's grasshopper)
44. Chorthippus changbaishanensis Liu, 1987 (Jilin grasshopper)
45. Chorthippus changtunensis Yin, 1984
46. Chorthippus chapini Chang, 1939
47. Chorthippus chayuensis Yin, 1984
48. Chorthippus chloroticus (Bolívar, 1908) (greenish field grasshopper)
49. Chorthippus cialancensis Nadig, 1986 (Piedmont grasshopper)
50. Chorthippus conicaudatus Xia & Jin, 1982
51. Chorthippus corsicus (Chopard, 1924) (Corsican grasshopper)
52. Chorthippus crassiceps Ramme, 1926 (plump-headed grasshopper)
53. Chorthippus dabanshanensis Chen, Zeng & Bao, 2011
54. Chorthippus dahinganlingensis Lian & Zheng, 1987
55. Chorthippus daitongensis Huo, 1994
56. Chorthippus daixianensis Zheng, Shi & Ma, 1996
57. Chorthippus darvazicus Mistshenko, 1951 (Darvaz grasshopper)
58. Chorthippus dashanensis Mao, Ren & Ou, 2011
59. Chorthippus davatchii Descamps, 1967
60. Chorthippus daweishanensis Fu & Zheng, 2000
61. Chorthippus demokidovi (Ramme, 1930)
62. Chorthippus deqinensis Liu, 1984
63. Chorthippus dichrous (Eversmann, 1859) (two-coloured grasshopper)
64. Chorthippus dierli Ingrisch, 1990
65. Chorthippus dirshi Fishelson, 1969
66. Chorthippus dorsatus (Zetterstedt, 1821) (steppe grasshopper)
67. Chorthippus dubius (Zubovski, 1898)
68. Chorthippus eisentrauti (Ramme, 1931) (Eisentraut's bow-winged grasshopper)
69. Chorthippus elbursianus Mistshenko, 1951
70. Chorthippus ezuoqiensis Ren, Wang & Zhang, 1998
71. Chorthippus fallax (Zubovski, 1900)
72. Chorthippus ferdinandi Vedenina & Helversen, 2009 (Ferdinand's grasshopper)
73. Chorthippus ferghanensis Umnov, 1931
74. Chorthippus flavabdomenis Liu, 1981
75. Chorthippus flavitibias Zheng, Ma & Wang, 1996
76. Chorthippus flexivenoides Zheng, Zhang, Sun, Li & Xu, 2008
77. Chorthippus foveatus Xia & Jin, 1982
78. Chorthippus gansuensis Zheng, 1999
79. Chorthippus geminus Mistshenko, 1951
80. Chorthippus genheensis Li & Yin, 1987
81. Chorthippus giganteus Mistshenko, 1951
82. Chorthippus gongbuensis Liang & Zheng, 1991
83. Chorthippus gongshanensis Zheng & Mao, 1997
84. Chorthippus grahami Chang, 1937
85. Chorthippus guandishanensis Ma, Zheng & Guo, 2000
86. Chorthippus guansuacris (Cao, Shen & Xie, 1991)
87. Chorthippus haibeiensis Zheng & Chen, 2001
88. Chorthippus halawuensis Zheng, 2000
89. Chorthippus hallasanus (Storozhenko & Paik, 2007)
90. Chorthippus hammarstroemi (Miram, 1907)
91. Chorthippus hebeiensis Li & Jiang, 2011
92. Chorthippus heiheensis Wang, 2007
93. Chorthippus heilongjiangensis Lian & Zheng, 1987
94. Chorthippus helanshanensis Zheng, 1999
95. Chorthippus helverseni Mol, Çiplak & Sirin, 2003
96. Chorthippus hemipterus Uvarov, 1926
97. Chorthippus hengshanensis Ma, Guo & Zheng, 1995
98. Chorthippus himalayanus Balderson & Yin, 1987
99. Chorthippus hirtus Uvarov, 1927
100. Chorthippus horqinensis Li & Yin, 1987
101. Chorthippus hsiai Zheng & Tu, 1964
102. Chorthippus huchengensis Xia & Jin, 1982
103. Chorthippus hyrcanus Bey-Bienko, 1960
104. Chorthippus ilkazi Uvarov, 1934 (Ilgaz mountain grasshopper)
105. Chorthippus indus Uvarov, 1942
106. Chorthippus ingenitzkyi (Zubovski, 1898)
107. Chorthippus intermedius (Bey-Bienko, 1926)
108. Chorthippus jachontovi Mistshenko, 1951
109. Chorthippus jacobsi Harz, 1975 (Iberian field grasshopper)
110. Chorthippus jacobsoni (Ikonnikov, 1911)
111. Chorthippus jilinensis Ren, Zhao & Hao, 2002
112. Chorthippus jishishanensis Zheng & Xie, 2000
113. Chorthippus johnseni Harz, 1982
114. Chorthippus jucundus (Fischer, 1853)
115. Chorthippus jutlandica Fogh Nielsen, 2003 (Jutland bow-winged grasshopper)
116. Chorthippus kalunshanensis Wang, 2007
117. Chorthippus kanasensis Wang & Zheng, 2012
118. Chorthippus kangdingensis Zheng & Shi, 2007
119. Chorthippus karatavicus Bey-Bienko, 1936
120. Chorthippus karateghinicus Mistshenko, 1951
121. Chorthippus karelini (Uvarov, 1910)
122. Chorthippus kazdaghensis Mol & Çiplak, 2005
123. Chorthippus keshanensis Zhang, Zheng & Ren, 1993
124. Chorthippus ketmenicus Bey-Bienko, 1949
125. Chorthippus kirghizicus Mistshenko, 1979
126. Chorthippus kiyosawai Furukawa, 1950
127. Chorthippus kusnetzovi Bey-Bienko, 1949
128. Chorthippus labaumei Ramme, 1926
129. Chorthippus lacustris La Greca & Messina, 1975 (Epirus dancing grasshopper)
130. Chorthippus latilifoveatus Xia & Jin, 1982
131. Chorthippus latisulcus Zheng & He, 1995
132. Chorthippus lebanicus Massa & Fontana, 1998
133. Chorthippus leduensis Zheng & Xin, 1999
134. Chorthippus loratus (Fischer von Waldheim, 1846)
135. Chorthippus louguanensis Zheng & Tu, 1964
136. Chorthippus luminosus Mistshenko, 1951
137. Chorthippus macrocerus (Fischer von Waldheim, 1846)
138. Chorthippus maracandicus Mistshenko, 1979
139. Chorthippus maritimus Mistshenko, 1951
140. Chorthippus markamensis Yin, 1984
141. Chorthippus marocanus Nadig, 1976
142. Chorthippus messinai (La Greca, Di Mauro, Viglianisi & Monello, 2000) (Messina's grasshopper)
143. Chorthippus miramae Ramme, 1939
144. Chorthippus mistshenkoi Avakyan, 1956
145. Chorthippus mollis (Charpentier, 1825) (lesser grasshopper)
146. Chorthippus monilicornis Umnov, 1931
147. Chorthippus moreanus Willemse, Helversen & Odé, 2009 (Morea grasshopper)
148. Chorthippus muktinathensis Balderson & Yin, 1987
149. Chorthippus neipopennis Xia & Jin, 1982
150. Chorthippus nemus Liu, 1984
151. Chorthippus nepalensis Balderson & Yin, 1987
152. Chorthippus nevadensis Pascual, 1976 (Sierra Nevadan grasshopper)
153. Chorthippus nigricanivenus Zheng, Ma & Wang, 1996
154. Chorthippus ningwuensis Zheng, Shi & Ma, 1996
155. Chorthippus obtusicaudatus Mao, Ren & Ou, 2011
156. Chorthippus occidentalis Xia & Jin, 1982
157. Chorthippus oreophilus Bey-Bienko, 1948
158. Chorthippus oschei Helversen, 1986 (Carpathian dancing grasshopper)
159. Chorthippus pamiricus (Ramme, 1930)
160. Chorthippus parnon Willemse, Helversen & Odé, 2009 (Parnon grasshopper)
161. Chorthippus pascuus Umnov, 1931
162. Chorthippus pavlovskii Mistshenko, 1951
163. Chorthippus peneri Fishelson, 1969
164. Chorthippus pilipes Bey-Bienko, 1933
165. Chorthippus planidentis Xia & Jin, 1982
166. Chorthippus plotnikovi Umnov, 1931
167. Chorthippus porphyropterus (Voroncovskij, 1928)
168. Chorthippus pulloides Ramme, 1926 (nymph-like grasshopper)
169. Chorthippus pullus (Philippi, 1830) (gravel grasshopper)
170. Chorthippus qilianshanensis Zheng & Xie, 2000
171. Chorthippus qingzangensis Yin, 1984
172. Chorthippus qixingtaiensis Yin, Ye & Yin, 2014
173. Chorthippus rebuntoensis (Ishikawa, 2002)
174. Chorthippus reissingeri Harz, 1972 (Reissinger's grasshopper)
175. Chorthippus relicticus Sirin, Helversen & Çiplak, 2010 (Karaman grasshopper)
176. Chorthippus robustus Mistshenko, 1979
177. Chorthippus rubensabdomenis Liu, 1981
178. Chorthippus rubratibialis Schmidt, 1978 (Italian bow-winged grasshopper)
179. Chorthippus ruficornus Zheng, 1988
180. Chorthippus rufifemurus Zheng, Ma & Wang, 1996
181. Chorthippus rufipennis Jia & Liang, 1993
182. Chorthippus saitzevi Mistshenko, 1979
183. Chorthippus sampeyrensis Nadig, 1986 (Sampeyre grasshopper)
184. Chorthippus sangiorgii (Finot, 1902) (Cephalonia grasshopper)
185. Chorthippus sanlanggothis Ingrisch & Garai, 2001
186. Chorthippus saulcyi (Krauss, 1888) (French grasshopper)
187. Chorthippus savalanicus Uvarov, 1933
188. Chorthippus saxatilis Bey-Bienko, 1948
189. Chorthippus separatanus Liu, 1981
190. Chorthippus shantariensis Mistshenko, 1951
191. Chorthippus shantungensis Chang, 1939
192. Chorthippus shennongjiaensis Zheng & Li, 2000
193. Chorthippus shumakovi Bey-Bienko, 1963
194. Chorthippus similis Umnov, 1930
195. Chorthippus smardai Chládek, 2014 (Slovak grasshopper)
196. Chorthippus songoricus Bey-Bienko, 1936
197. Chorthippus squamopennis Zheng, 1980
198. Chorthippus supranimbus Yamasaki, 1968
199. Chorthippus szijji Harz, 1982
200. Chorthippus tadzhicus Mistshenko, 1951
201. Chorthippus taibaiensis Zheng, Li & Wei, 2009
202. Chorthippus taishanensis Yin, Ye & Yin, 2010
203. Chorthippus taiyuanensis Ma, Guo & Zheng, 1995
204. Chorthippus taurensis Sirin & Çiplak, 2005
205. Chorthippus tianshanensis Liu & Fan, 1992
206. Chorthippus tianshanicus Umnov, 1930
207. Chorthippus tiantangensis Zhong & Zheng, 2004
208. Chorthippus tibetanus Uvarov, 1935
209. Chorthippus transalajicus Mistshenko, 1979
210. Chorthippus trinacriae (La Greca, Di Mauro, Viglianisi & Monello, 2000) (Sicilian Lesser grasshopper)
211. Chorthippus turanicus Tarbinsky, 1925
212. Chorthippus unicubitus Xia & Jin, 1982
213. Chorthippus uvarovi Bey-Bienko, 1929
214. Chorthippus vagans (Eversmann, 1848) (heath grasshopper)
215. Chorthippus vicinus Mistshenko, 1951
216. Chorthippus wenquanensis Wang & Zheng, 2012
217. Chorthippus willemsei Harz, 1971 (Willemse's grasshopper)
218. Chorthippus wuyishanensis Zheng & Ma, 1999
219. Chorthippus wuyuerhensis Zheng, Zhang, Sun, Li & Xu, 2008
220. Chorthippus xiaoxinganlingensis Wang, 2007
221. Chorthippus xiningensis Zheng & Chen, 2001
222. Chorthippus xueshanensis Zheng & Mao, 1997
223. Chorthippus xunhuaensis Zheng & Xie, 2000
224. Chorthippus yajiangensis Zheng & Shi, 2007
225. Chorthippus yanmenguanensis Zheng & Shi, 1995
226. Chorthippus yanyuanensis Jin & Lin, 1982-1983
227. Chorthippus yersini Harz, 1975 (Yersin's grasshopper)
228. Chorthippus yulingensis Zheng & Tu, 1964
229. Chorthippus zaitzevi Mistshenko, 1979
230. Chorthippus zhengi Ma & Guo, 1995
