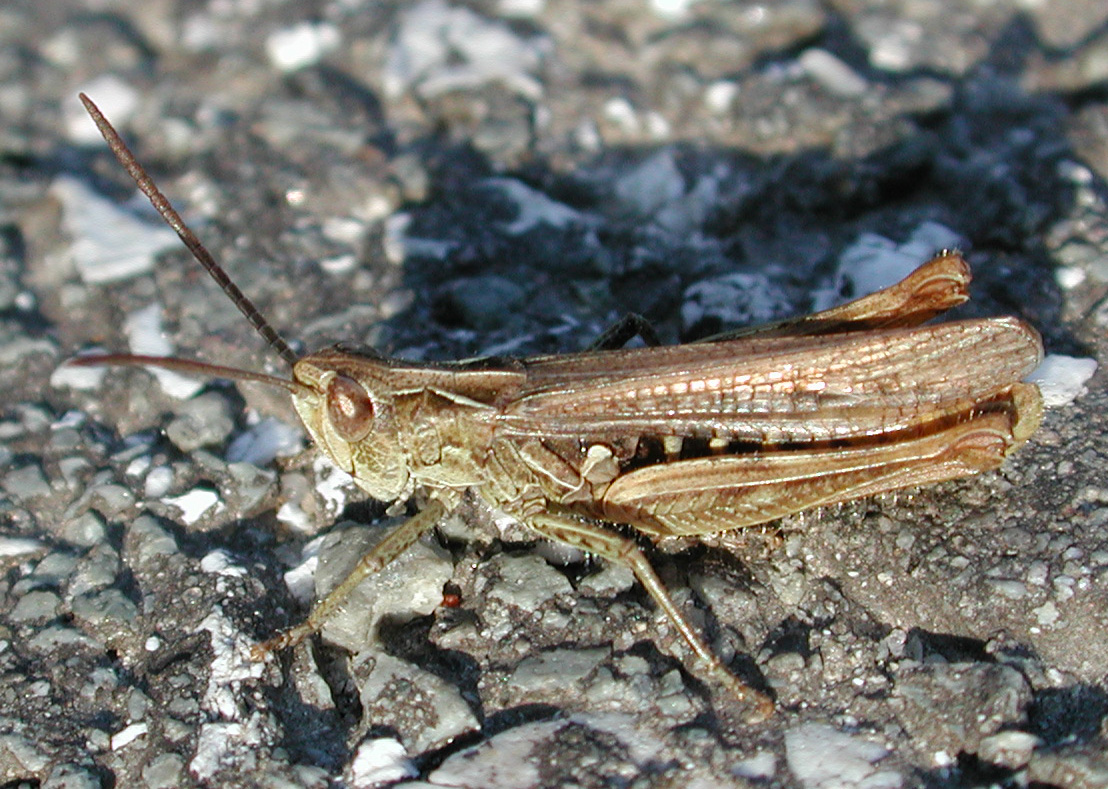
- Chorthippus mollis male Germany

Scientific classification
- Kingdom: Animalia
- Phylum: Arthropoda
- Clade: Pancrustacea
- Class: Insecta
- Order: Orthoptera
- Suborder: Caelifera
- Family: Acrididae
- Genus: Chorthippus
- Species: C. mollis

Binomial name
- Chorthippus mollis (Charpentier, 1825)

Audio
- Song

= Chorthippus mollis =

Species of grasshopper

Chorthippus mollis is a species belonging to the family Acrididae, subfamily Gomphocerinae. It is found across much of Europe. The species prefers dry-warm locations with sandy ground and open soil, also roadsides, clearcuts and fallow land.

Close-up of a Chorthippus mollis
