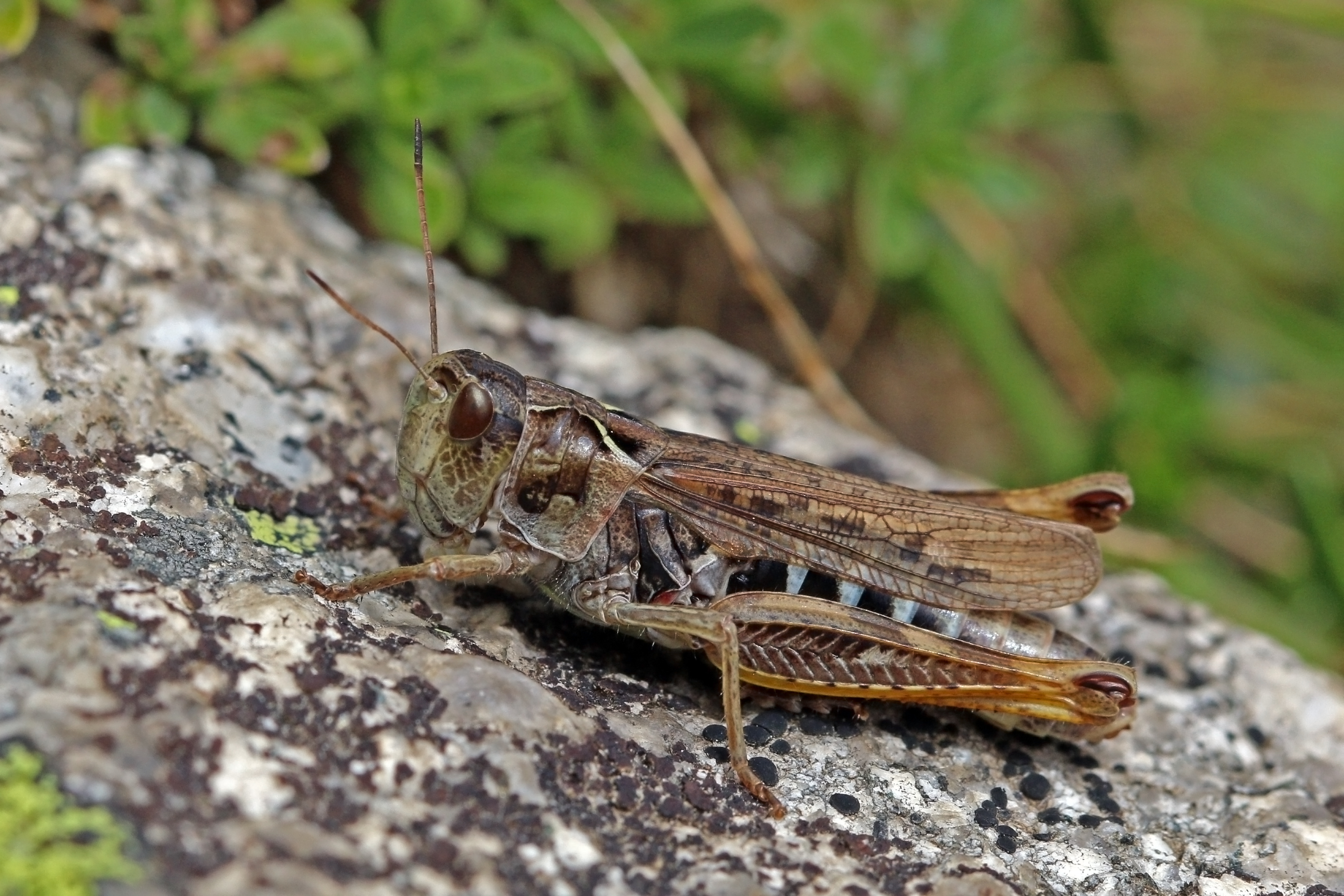
- Female Siberian grasshopper (Gomphocerus sibiricus)

Scientific classification
- Domain: Eukaryota
- Kingdom: Animalia
- Phylum: Arthropoda
- Class: Insecta
- Order: Orthoptera
- Suborder: Caelifera
- Family: Acrididae
- Subfamily: Gomphocerinae
- Tribe: Gomphocerini; Fieber, 1853

Genera
- See text

Synonyms
- Chorthipini; Chorthippini Shumakov, 1963; Omocestina

= Gomphocerini =

Tribe of grasshoppers

Gomphocerini is a tribe of grasshoppers of the family Acrididae.

== Genera ==
The Orthoptera Species File lists the following:

1. Aeropedellus Hebard, 1935
2. Bruneria McNeill, 1897
3. Chorthippus Fieber, 1852
4. Dasyhippus Uvarov, 1930
5. Gomphoceridius Bolívar, 1914 - monotypic G. brevipennis (Brisout de Barneville, 1848)
6. Gomphocerippus Roberts, 1941
7. Gomphoceroides Zheng, Xi & Lian, 1992
8. Gomphocerus Thunberg, 1815 including Gomphocerus sibiricus
9. Mesasippus Tarbinsky, 1931
10. Myrmeleotettix Bolívar, 1914
11. Pezohippus Bei-Bienko, 1948
12. Phlibostroma Scudder, 1875 - monotypic P. quadrimaculatum (Thomas, 1871)
13. Pseudochorthippus Defaut, 2012
14. Schmidtiacris Storozhenko, 2002
15. Stauroderus Bolívar, 1897
16. Stenobothroides Xu & Zheng, 1996 - monotypic S. xinjiangensis Xu & Zheng, 1996
