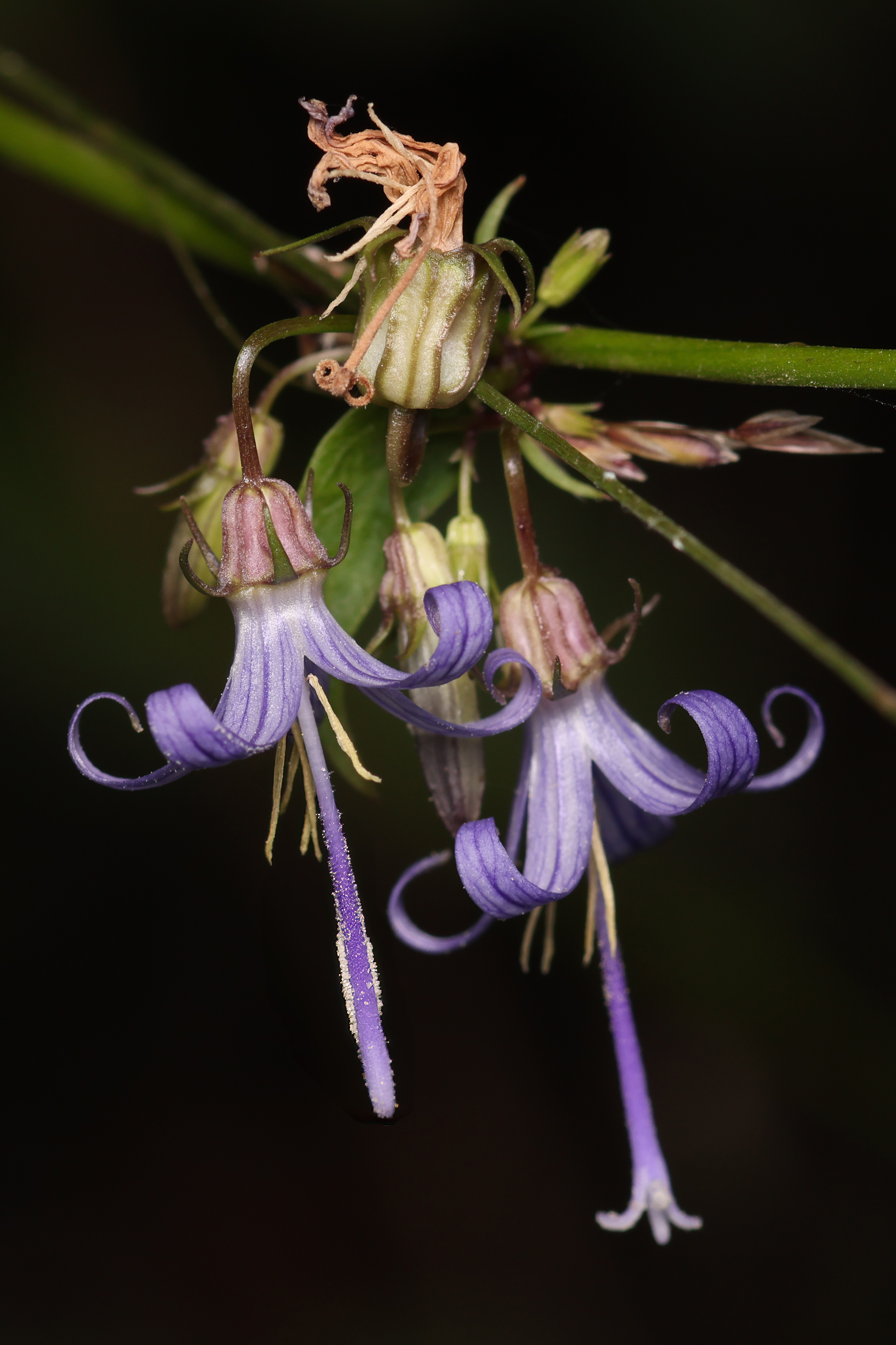
- S. prenanthoides flowering in the Santa Cruz Mountains

Scientific classification
- Kingdom: Plantae
- Clade: Tracheophytes
- Clade: Angiosperms
- Clade: Eudicots
- Clade: Asterids
- Order: Asterales
- Family: Campanulaceae
- Genus: Smithiastrum
- Species: S. prenanthoides

Binomial name
- Smithiastrum prenanthoides (Durand) Morin

Synonyms
- Asyneuma prenanthoides (Durand) McVaugh; Campanula prenanthoides Durand

= Smithiastrum prenanthoides =

Species of flowering plant

Smithiastrum prenanthoides, commonly known as the California harebell, is a perennial flowering plant in the Campanulaceae. It was formerly classified as a member of either Campanula or Asyneuma and was re-split following the discovery that genera in the family are polyphyletic. S. prenanthoides belongs to one of several small genera in the Campanulaceae native to California and grows in montane coniferous forests.

== Description ==
Smithiastrum prenanthoides is a perennial herb with an erect branching stem 0.6–0.9 m high. The stem is slightly puberulent. The slender leaves range from 10 to 60 mm in length and usually have a toothed margin and a pointed apex. The leaves are attached to the stem by very short petioles, usually less than 5 mm long, and the upper leaves on the stem are usually sessile. They are wider toward the base with two small teeth on each side.

The nodding flowers are blue-purple and appear on a panicle in groups of 3–5. The pedicel is variable in length, between 6–20 mm. The sepals are spreading to reflexed and the calyx is fused into an obconic tube covering less than half the length of the corolla. The corolla, fused at the base, is divided into 5 slender petals that are distinctly recurved at their tips. The stamens are 6 mm long with ciliate base. The ovary is 2.5–5 mm in diameter and hemispheric. The style, 15–18 mm long, is noticeably exserted beyond the sepals and petals and may be slightly curved. It is likewise blue and the distal half is papillate. The stigma is clavate and has 3 short curved divisions.

Smithiastrum prenanthoides blooms in June and July. The fruit is a hemispheric dehiscent capsule with prominent ribbing. The pores are distributed at or below the middle of the capsule. The oblong seeds are 2 mm long.

== Taxonomy ==
Smithiastrum prenanthoides was originally described as Campanula prenanthoides in 1855 by Elias Durand. Later, in 1945, it was transferred to the genus Asyneuma under the name A. prenanthoides by Rogers McVaugh. Finally, in 2020, it was transferred to a newly erected genus, Smithiastrum, by Nancy Morin.

Smithiastrum prenanthoides was split from Campanula and Asyneuma in order to resolve a previously polyphyletic grouping of genera in the Campanulaceae. It now belongs to one of several small, newly erected taxa in the Campanulaceae native to California; other novel genera include Eastwoodiella and Ravenella. The genus name Smithiastrum honors James Payne Smith Jr., a California botanist. The latter half of the generic epithet, astrum, denotes a star in Latin and refers to the shape of the flowers. The specific epithet, prenanthoides, refers to the fact that the panicle just prior to flowering closely resembles the genus Prenanthes.

The diploid number of Smithiastrum prenanthoides is 2n = 16.

== Distribution and habitat ==
Smithiastrum prenanthoides is native to California and Oregon. It grows in the temperate coniferous forests of the Klamath Ranges, Cascade Range, Coastal Ranges, and part of the Sierra Nevadas. It is associated with redwood forest, yellow pine forest, red fir forest, and mixed evergreen forest. It is found at elevations of 50–2000 m.

== Uses ==
In cultivation, Smithiastrum prenanthoides requires part shade and moist soil with good drainage. It may be a host for Hyles lineata, the white-lined sphinx moth. Historically, the bulbs of Smithiastrum prenanthoides were consumed as a winter food by Ohlone peoples.

== Gallery ==
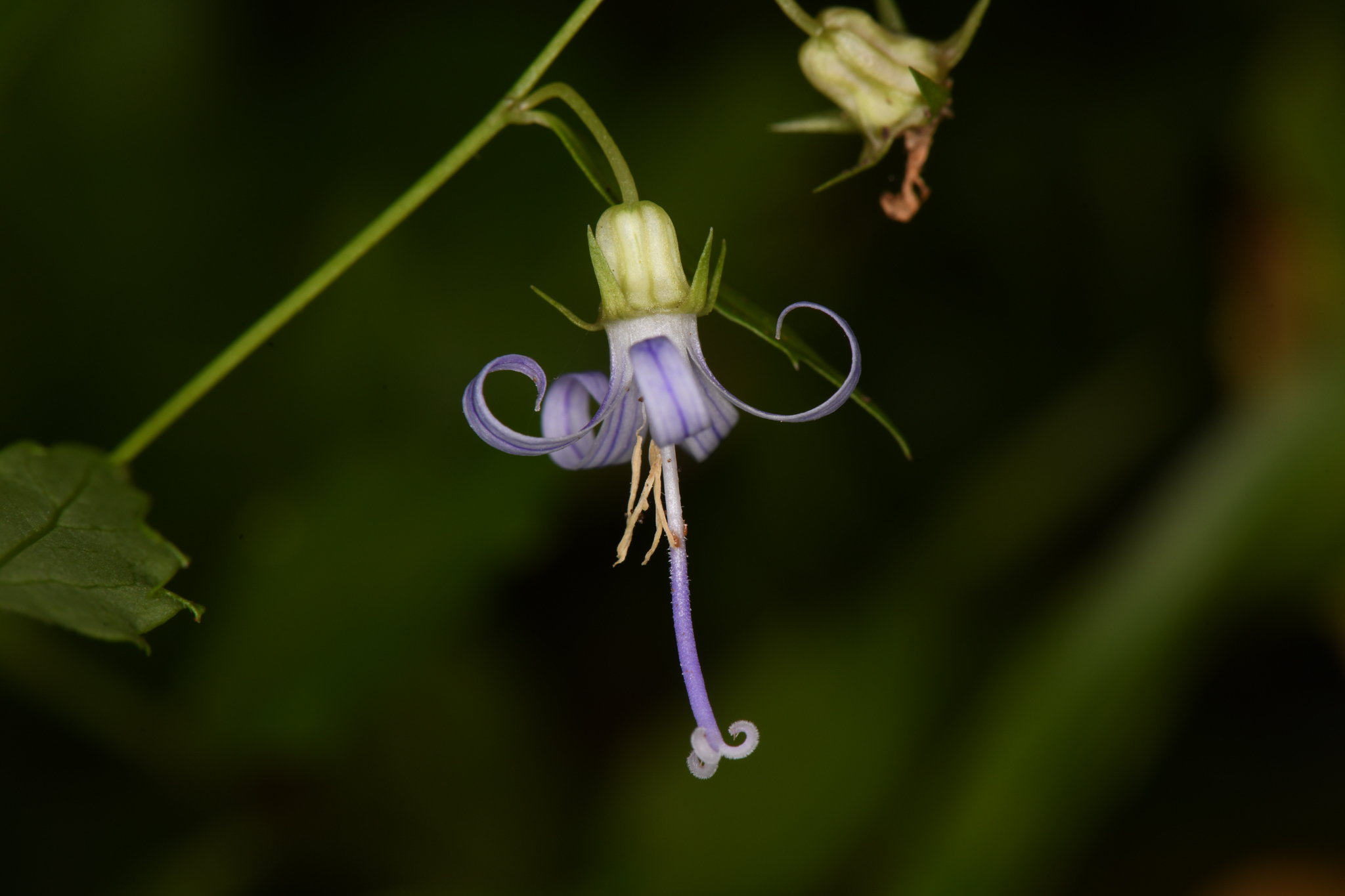
Detailed closeup of individual flowering in Redwood National and State Parks

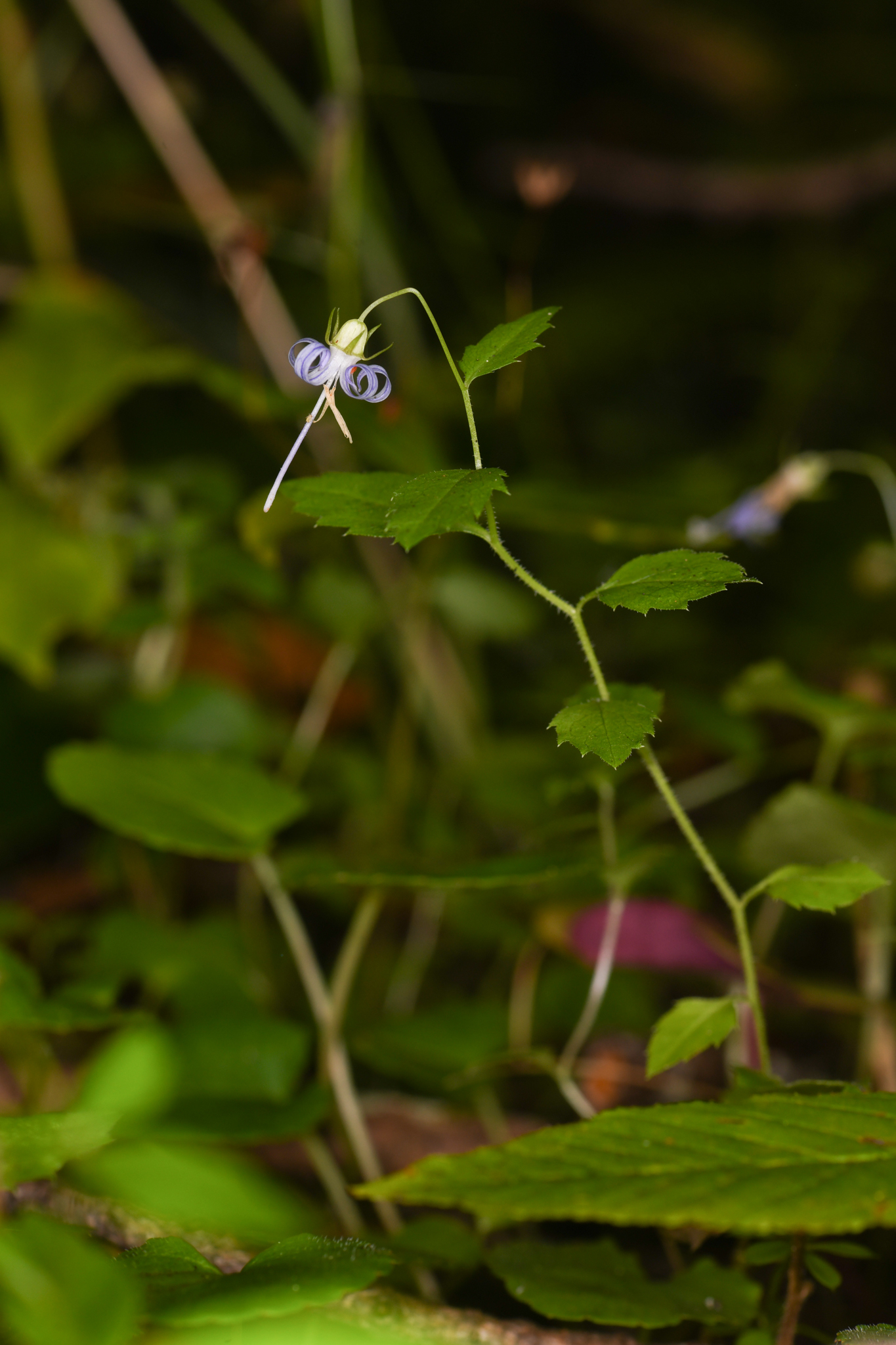
Vegetative habit of S. prenanthoides
