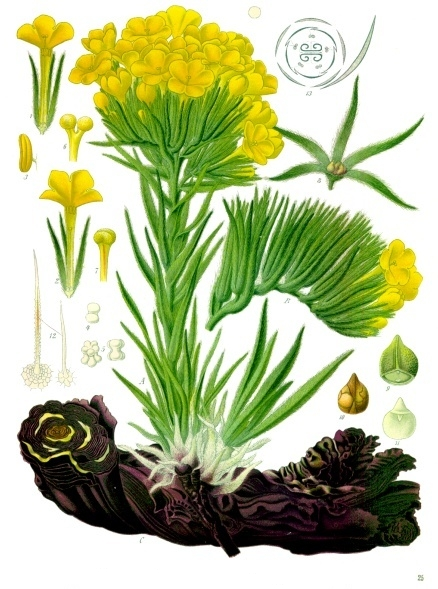
- Arnebia densiflora

Scientific classification
- Kingdom: Plantae
- Clade: Embryophytes
- Clade: Tracheophytes
- Clade: Spermatophytes
- Clade: Angiosperms
- Clade: Eudicots
- Clade: Asterids
- Order: Boraginales
- Family: Boraginaceae
- Subfamily: Boraginoideae
- Genus: Arnebia; Forssk. (1775)

Type species
- Arnebia tinctoria Forssk.

Species
- 36; see text

Synonyms
- Arnebiola Chiov. (1929); Dioclea Spreng. (1824), nom. illeg.; Echioides Ortega (1773), nom. illeg.; Leptanthe Klotzsch (1862); Macrotomia DC. ex Meisn. (1840); Meneghinia Endl. (1839), nom. superfl.; Munbya Boiss. (1849); Strobila G.Don (1837); Tetaris Lindl. (1868); Toxostigma A.Rich. (1850); Ulugbekia Zakirov (1961)

= Arnebia =

Genus of flowering plants in the borage family

Arnebia is a genus of flowering plants in the family Boraginaceae. There are about 36 species, most are located in the Mediterranean region and eastwards to the Himalayas and northern China, with one species extending into tropical Africa.

The generic name "Arnebia" originates from the Arabic name shajaret el arneb.

The Arnebia genus was first established by Pher Forsskal in 1775, and mostly confined to Asia with a few species occurring in the drier parts of North Africa

== Species ==
36 species are accepted.

- Arnebia afghanica (Kitam.) Rech.f. & Riedl
- Arnebia benthamii (Wall. ex G.Don) I.M.Johnst.
- Arnebia bhattacharyyae Ambrish & S.K.Srivast.
- Arnebia cana (Tzvelev) Czerep.
- Arnebia coerulea Schipcz.
- Arnebia decumbens (Vent.) Cosson & Kralik
- Arnebia densiflora (Ledeb. ex Nordm.) Ledeb.
- Arnebia euchroma (Royle ex Benth.) I.M.Johnst.
- Arnebia fimbriata Maxim.
- Arnebia fimbriopetala Stocks
- Arnebia guttata Bunge
- Arnebia hispidissima (Sieber ex Lehm.) A.DC.
- Arnebia inconspicua Hemsl. & Lace
- Arnebia johnstonii Riedl
- Arnebia ladakhensis Ambrish & P.Singh
- Arnebia latibracteata Riedl
- Arnebia leptosiphonoides Vatke
- Arnebia lindbergiana (Rech.f.) I.M.Johnst.
- Arnebia linearifolia A.DC.
- Arnebia minima Wettst. ex Stapf
- Arnebia nandadeviensis Chandra Sek. & R.S.Rawal
- Arnebia obovata Bunge
- Arnebia paucisetosa A.D.Li
- Arnebia purpurascens (A.Rich.) Baker
- Arnebia rechingeri Riedl
- Arnebia sewerzowii Regel
- Arnebia simulatrix Riedl
- Arnebia speciosa Aitch. & Hemsl.
- Arnebia stenocalyx Riedl
- Arnebia szechenyi Kanitz
- Arnebia tinctoria Forssk.
- Arnebia transcaspica Popov
- Arnebia tschimganica (B.Fedtsch.) G.L.Zhu
- Arnebia ugamensis (Popov) Riedl
- Arnebia violascens Riedl
- Arnebia waziristanica Riedl
