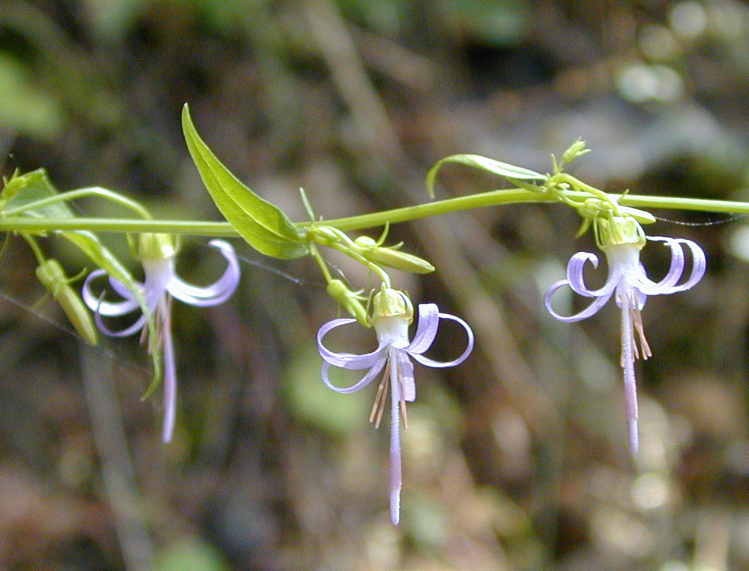
- Smithiastrum prenanthoides near Ashland, Oregon

Scientific classification
- Kingdom: Plantae
- Clade: Tracheophytes
- Clade: Angiosperms
- Clade: Eudicots
- Clade: Asterids
- Order: Asterales
- Family: Campanulaceae
- Subfamily: Campanuloideae
- Genus: Smithiastrum; Morin

Type species
- Smithiastrum prenanthoides (Durand) Morin

Species
- Smithiastrum prenanthoides (Durand) Morin; Smithiastrum wilkinsianum (Greene) Morin

= Smithiastrum =

Genus of plants

Smithiastrum is a genus of plants in the Campanulaceae or bellflower family found in the western United States. Its members, which are commonly known as harebells, were previously included in the family's type genus, Campanula, but were segregated when it was found that Campanula was polyphyletic. As of 2023, Smithiastrum comprises two species.

== Description ==
Smithiastrum is a small genus of slender perennial herbs. Species lack a basal rosette of leaves. The flowers are terminal or axillary. The hypanthium is cylindrical or obconic with a squared base. The sepals are highly slender and the corolla is noticeably divided for 66–90% of its length. The petals are slender and spreading to recurved. The fruiting capsule is ribbed and hemispherical to obconic.

== Taxonomy and naming ==
Smithiastrum was erected in 2020 by botanist Nancy Morin in a paper splitting several North American Campanula species into smaller genera to resolve a previously polyphyletic grouping of genera in the Campanulaceae. The genus name honors James Payne Smith Jr., a California botanist. The latter half of the epithet, astrum, denotes a star in Latin and refers to the shape of the flowers.

The type species of Smithiastrum, S. prenanthoides, was originally placed in Campanula and has been included in Asyneuma. The latter genus is distinguished from related genera by its completely divided corolla and paniculate inflorescences. However, the petals in S. prenanthoides are basally connate and less strongly flared. Further differences lie in the filament structure, style papillae, and capsule shape.

The only other species of Smithiastrum as of 2023, S. wilkinsianum, had been suggested to be sister to S. prenanthoides in 2011 and 2018 before Smithiastrum was erected. Both species belong to the Rapunculus clade, one of two deeply separated clades in Campanula sensu lato.

As of August 2023, Smithiastrum consists of 2 accepted species:

- Smithiastrum prenanthoides (Durand) Morin
- Smithiastrum wilkinsianum (Greene) Morin

== Distribution and habitat ==
Members of Smithiastrum are found in the coniferous forests of California in the western Sierra Nevada, Cascade Range, Klamath Range, North Coast Range, and western Oregon in the Coast and Cascade Ranges.
