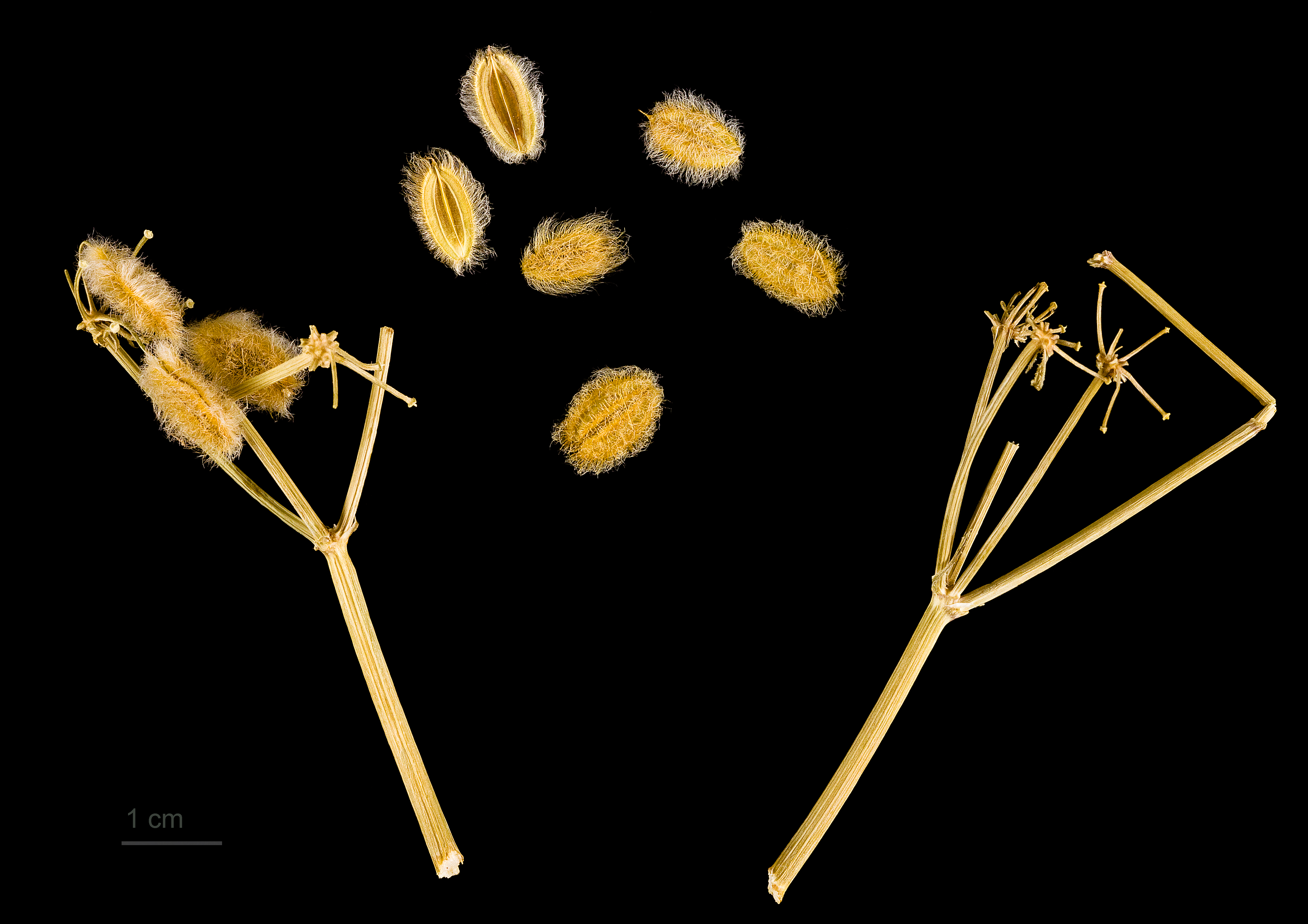
- Ammodaucus leucotrichus - MHNT

Scientific classification
- Kingdom: Plantae
- Clade: Tracheophytes
- Clade: Angiosperms
- Clade: Eudicots
- Clade: Asterids
- Order: Apiales
- Family: Apiaceae
- Subfamily: Apioideae
- Tribe: Scandiceae
- Subtribe: Daucinae
- Genus: Ammodaucus; Coss. & Dur.
- Species: A. leucotrichus

Binomial name
- Ammodaucus leucotrichus (Coss. & Dur.) Coss. & Dur.

= Ammodaucus =

Genus of flowering plants

Ammodaucus leucotrichus is a species of flowering plant in the family Apiaceae and the sole member of the genus Ammodaucus. It is endemic to northern Africa, including the Canary Islands.

In Morocco, the plant is known as kammūn ṣūfī ("wooly cumin"), and is used medicinally in teas and compresses to treat a variety of ailments, including snake bites and respiratory ailments.
