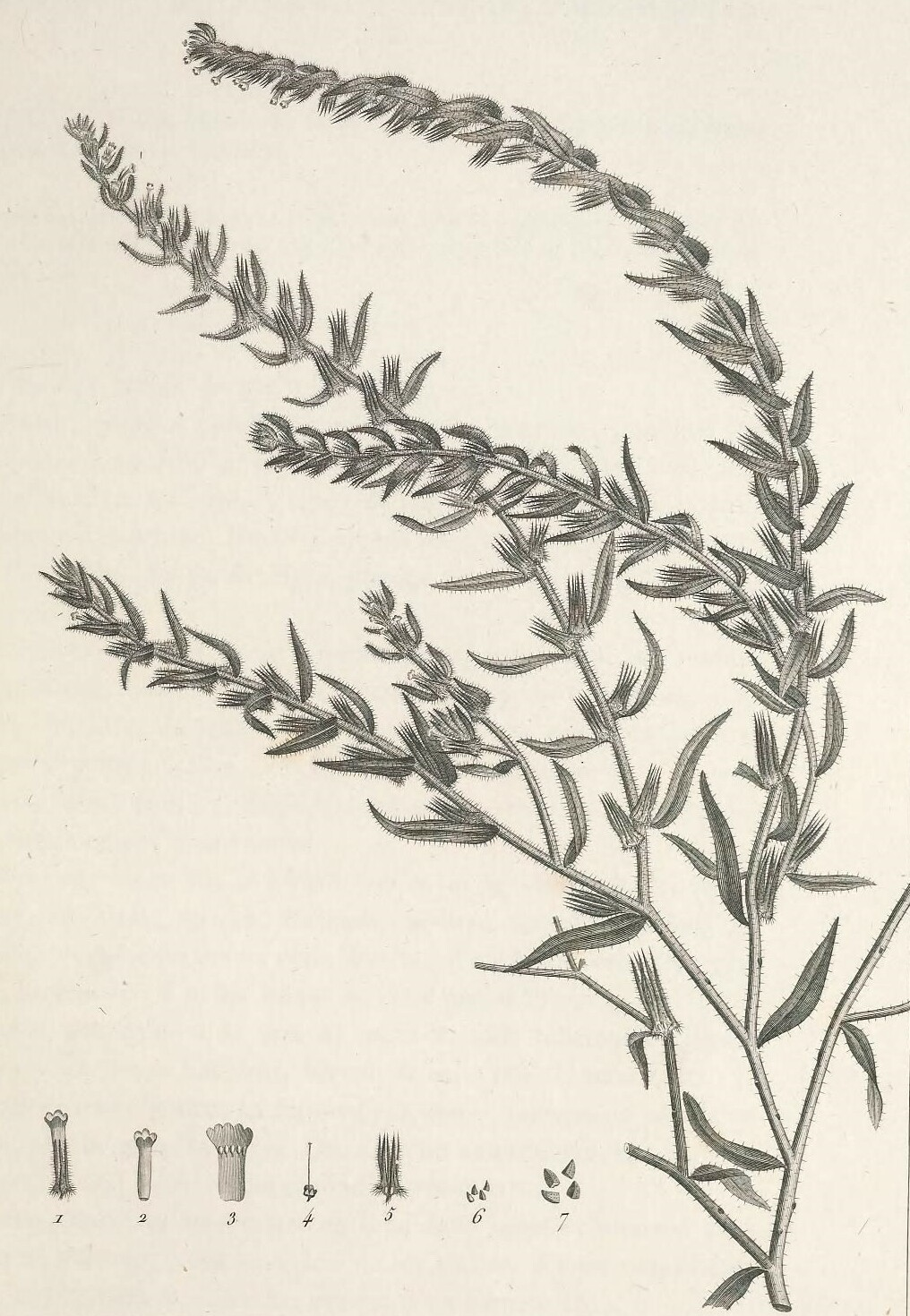

Scientific classification
- Kingdom: Plantae
- Clade: Embryophytes
- Clade: Tracheophytes
- Clade: Spermatophytes
- Clade: Angiosperms
- Clade: Eudicots
- Clade: Asterids
- Order: Boraginales
- Family: Boraginaceae
- Genus: Arnebia
- Species: A. decumbens

Binomial name
- Arnebia decumbens (Ventenat) Cosson & Kralik

= Arnebia decumbens =

Species of flowering plant in the borage family

Arnebia decumbens (Ventenat) Cosson & Kralik is a plant in the family Boraginaceae native to Europe and much of central and southeastern Asia. It is an annual herb with yellow flowers, growing on mountain slopes and sandy waste areas.
