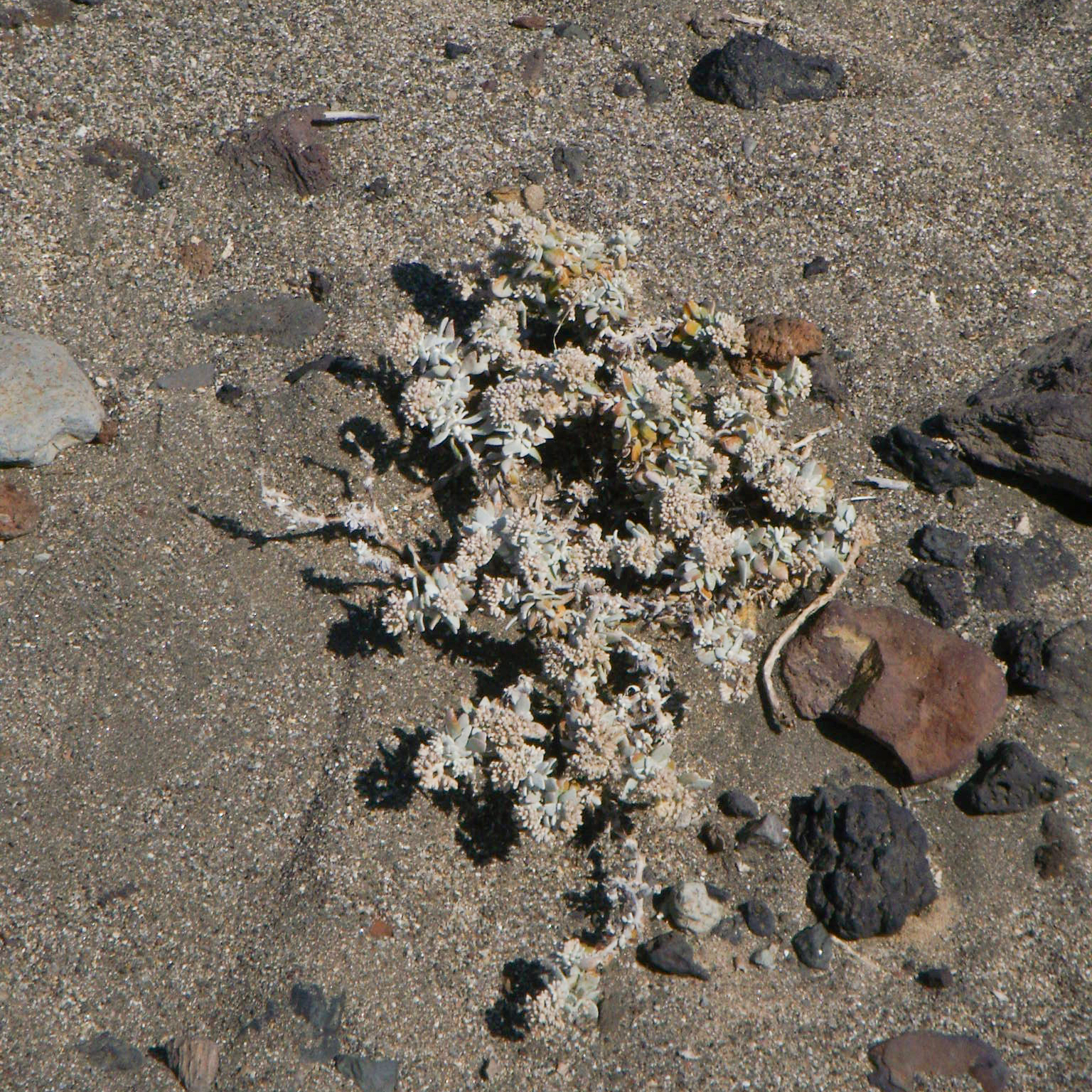
- Polycarpaea nivea in the vicinity of El Médano on the island of Tenerife, Canary Islands

Scientific classification
- Kingdom: Plantae
- Clade: Tracheophytes
- Clade: Angiosperms
- Clade: Eudicots
- Order: Caryophyllales
- Family: Caryophyllaceae
- Genus: Polycarpaea
- Species: P. nivea

Binomial name
- Polycarpaea nivea (Aiton, 1828) Webb

Synonyms
- Achyranthes nivea Aiton; Polycarpaea microphylla Cav. (1801); Illecebrum gnaphalodes Schousb.; Polycarpaea gnaphalodes (Schousb.) Poir. (1816); Polycarpaea candida Webb & Berthel. (1840); Polycarpaea candida var. diffusa Pit. (1909); Polycarpaea candida var. pygmaea Pit. (1909); Polycarpaea candida var. webbiana Pit. (1909); Polycarpaea lancifolia Christ

= Polycarpaea nivea =

Species of flowering plant

Polycarpaea nivea is a species of flowering plants in the family Caryophyllaceae. The species was described by William Aiton in 1828 as Achyranthes nivea, and it was placed in the genus Polycarpaea by Philip Barker Webb in 1849. The specific name nivea is Latin for "white as snow", and refers to the colour of the plant.

== Description ==
It is a low plant with succulent, silvery, densely haired leaves.

== Distribution ==
The species occurs in Mauritania, Morocco, the Canary Islands and Cape Verde.

== Synonyms ==
- Achyranthes nivea Aiton - basionym
- Polycarpaea microphylla Cav. (1801)
- Illecebrum gnaphalodes Schousb.
- Polycarpaea gnaphalodes (Schousb.) Poir. (1816)
- Polycarpaea candida Webb & Berthel. (1840)
- Polycarpaea candida var. diffusa Pit. (1909)
- Polycarpaea candida var. pygmaea Pit. (1909)
- Polycarpaea candida var. webbiana Pit. (1909)
- Polycarpaea lancifolia Christ
