= Geocaryum =

Scientific classification
- Kingdom: Plantae
- Clade: Tracheophytes
- Clade: Angiosperms
- Clade: Eudicots
- Clade: Asterids
- Order: Apiales
- Family: Apiaceae
- Subfamily: Apioideae
- Tribe: Scandiceae
- Subtribe: Scandicinae
- Genus: Geocaryum; Coss.

Genus of plants

Geocaryum is a genus of flowering plants belonging to the family Apiaceae.

Its native range is Northwestern Africa, Southeastern Europe to Turkey.

Species:

- Geocaryum capillifolium (Guss.) Coss.
- Geocaryum pumilum (Sm.) Nyman
