= Wladimir de Schoenefeld =

Botanist

Wladimir de Schoenefeld (12 January 1816 in Berlin – 8 September 1875 in Paris) was a German-born, French botanist.

From 1817 to 1833 he lived in France, then moved back to Berlin, where he stayed with botanist Karl Sigismund Kunth for several years prior to his return to Paris (1840). In Paris, he studied botany under Adrien-Henri de Jussieu and became good friends with Ernest Cosson.

In 1854 he was a founding member of the Société Botanique de France, serving as its secretary-general from 1862 to 1875. Following his death, Ernest Cosson published the biography, "Notice biographique sur Wladimir de Schoenefeld" (1876). The botanical genus Schoenefeldia (family Poaceae) was named in his honor by Karl Sigismund Kunth.

== Published works ==
- Rapport sur une herborisation faite par la Société dans la forêt de Fontainebleau, 1855 - Report of herborization made by the Société in Fontainebleau Forest.
- Sur un échantillon de Primula officinalis, 1856 - Involving a sample of Primula officinalis.
- Sur Trifolium elegans et T. hybridum, 1862 - On Trifolium elegans and Trifolium hybridum.
- Rapport sur une excursion faite en août 1860 par la Société botanique de France, 1863 - Report on an excursion made in August 1860 by the Société.
