= Polycarpaea robusta =

Scientific classification
- Kingdom: Plantae
- Clade: Tracheophytes
- Clade: Angiosperms
- Clade: Eudicots
- Order: Caryophyllales
- Family: Caryophyllaceae
- Genus: Polycarpaea
- Species: P. robusta

Binomial name
- Polycarpaea robusta (Pit.) G.Kunkel

Synonyms
- Polycarpaea candida var. robusta Pit.

Species of flowering plant

Polycarpaea robusta is a species of flowering plant. It is endemic to the Canary Islands.
