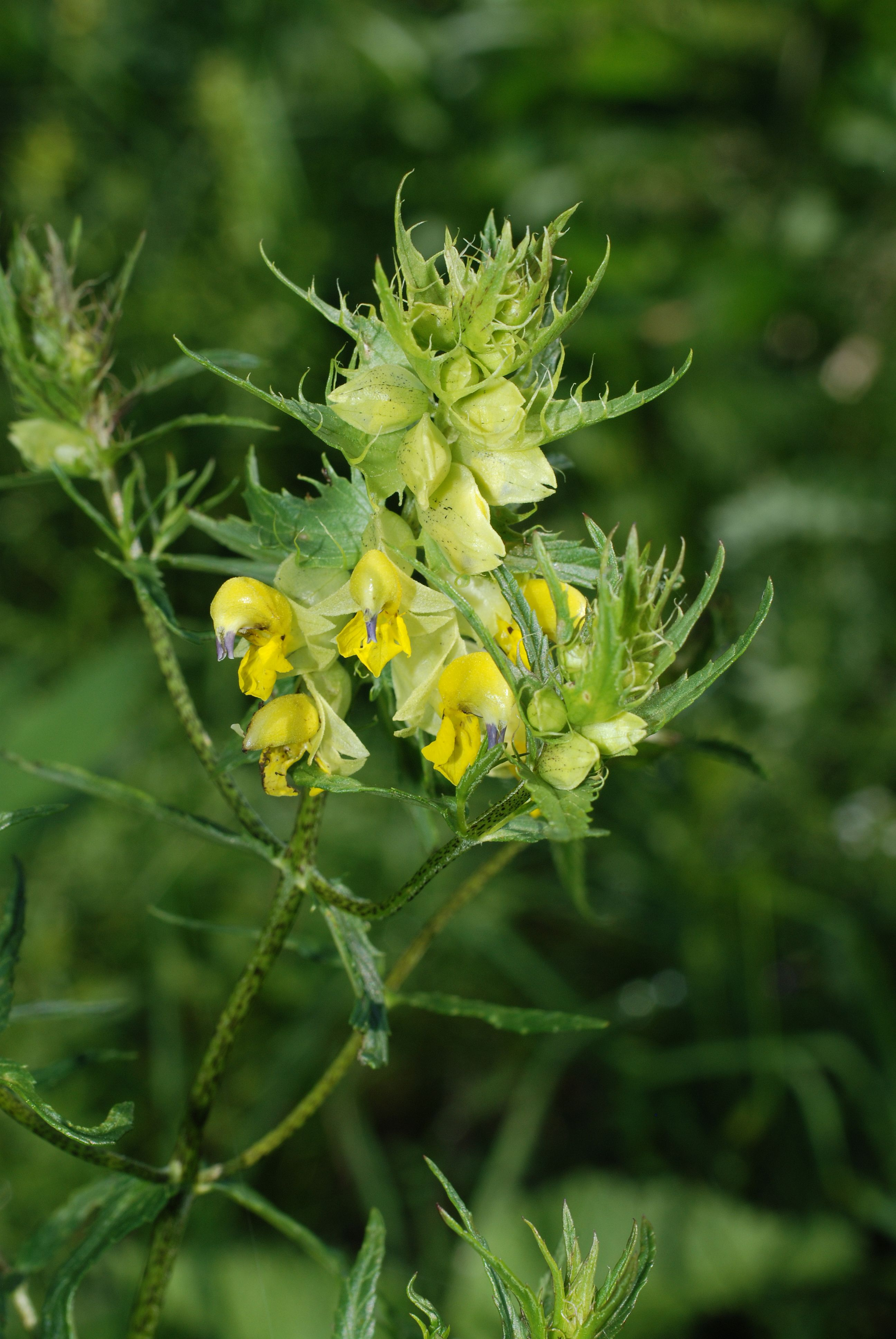

Scientific classification
- Kingdom: Plantae
- Clade: Embryophytes
- Clade: Tracheophytes
- Clade: Spermatophytes
- Clade: Angiosperms
- Clade: Eudicots
- Clade: Asterids
- Order: Lamiales
- Family: Orobanchaceae
- Genus: Rhinanthus
- Species: R. glacialis

Binomial name
- Rhinanthus glacialis Personnat, 1863

Synonyms
- List: There is a long list of synonyms for this species, here being listed only a few of them: Alectorolophus glacialis (Personnat) Fritsch; Alectorolophus gracilis Sterneck; Alectorolophus lanceolatus (Kováts ex Neilr.) Sterneck; Alectorolophus simplex Sterneck; Alectorolophus subalpinus (Sterneck) Behrendsen; Rhinanthus aristatus f. gracilis (Chabert) Hartl; Rhinanthus aristatus f. simplex (Sterneck) Hartl; Rhinanthus subalpinus (Sterneck) Schinz & Thell.; Rhinanthus vollmannii (Poeverl.) Bech.

= Rhinanthus glacialis =

Species of flowering plant in the broomrape family

Rhinanthus glacialis, commonly known as the aristate yellow rattle or glacier rattle, is a herbaceous plant species in the family Orobanchaceae, formerly classified as a member of the family Scrophulariaceae. This European species is primarily inhabiting the Central Europe.

== Taxonomy ==
Rhinanthus glacialis was first described in Bulletin de la Société botanique de France in year 1863 by Victor Personnat.

Taxonomists recognize around seven subspecies of Rhinanthus glacialis:

- Rhinanthus glacialis subsp. aristatus (Celak.) Rauschert
- Rhinanthus glacialis subsp. gracilis (Chabert) Rauschert
- Rhinanthus glacialis subsp. humilis (Braun-Blanq.) Rauschert
- Rhinanthus glacialis subsp. lanceolatus (Kováts ex Neilr.) Dostál
- Rhinanthus glacialis subsp. simplex (Sterneck) Rauschert
- Rhinanthus glacialis subsp. subalpinus (Sterneck) Rauschert
- Rhinanthus glacialis subsp. glacialis

== Description ==
This upright-growing herbaceous rattle can reach from 10 to 50 centimetres (3.9 to 20 in) of height. Its linear to lanceolate stem leaves are sessile and serrated, arranged opposite on plant's stem.

Bright to sulfur yellow bilabiate (two-lipped) flowers are usually 1.5–1.8 centimetres long and arranged into a special type of inflorescence, the so-called spike. Each flower has a curved and open corolla tube, as well as a distinct upper lip, which consists of 1–2 millimetres long purplish to whiteish teeth. There are no trichomes on flower's calyx. Bracts are present and have 4–8 millimetres long bristle teeth. The plant's flowering period is between June and September.

Layman can mistake Rhinanthus glacialis with similar rattles, especially the European Rhinanthus alectorolophus. R. glacialis can be distinguished from the latter by its hairless or only slightly hairy calyx, stem and leaves.

The family Orobanchaceae is well-known for having a lot of species that are at least hemiparasites (partial parasites), meaning they are dependent on their hosts – other plants – for mineral compounds or water, but produce their own organic compounds.

== Distribution ==
Rhinanthus glacialis is a European species, mostly inhabiting different countries of Central Europe (ranging from southeastern France to northwestern Balkan Peninsula). This relatively common rattle can be found growing on cultivated and semi-dry meadows, on fields (especially grain fields), different mountain slopes, on screes, pastures and other sunny areas. The plant inhabits altitudes ranging from lowland regions to mountain habitats with moderate climate conditions. This rattle prefers slightly basic and humid soil, containing only a few of nitrogen compounds.

== Gallery ==
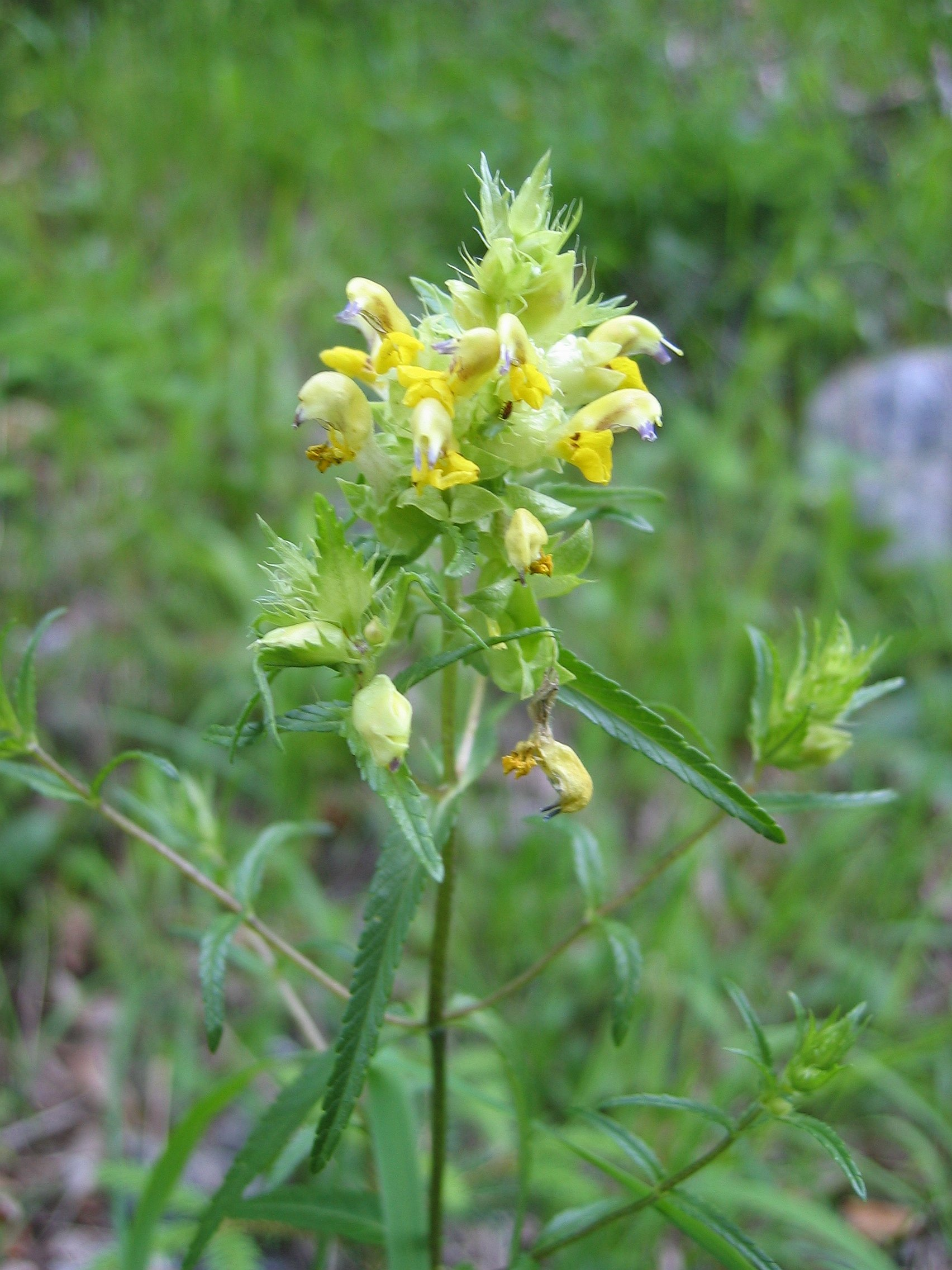

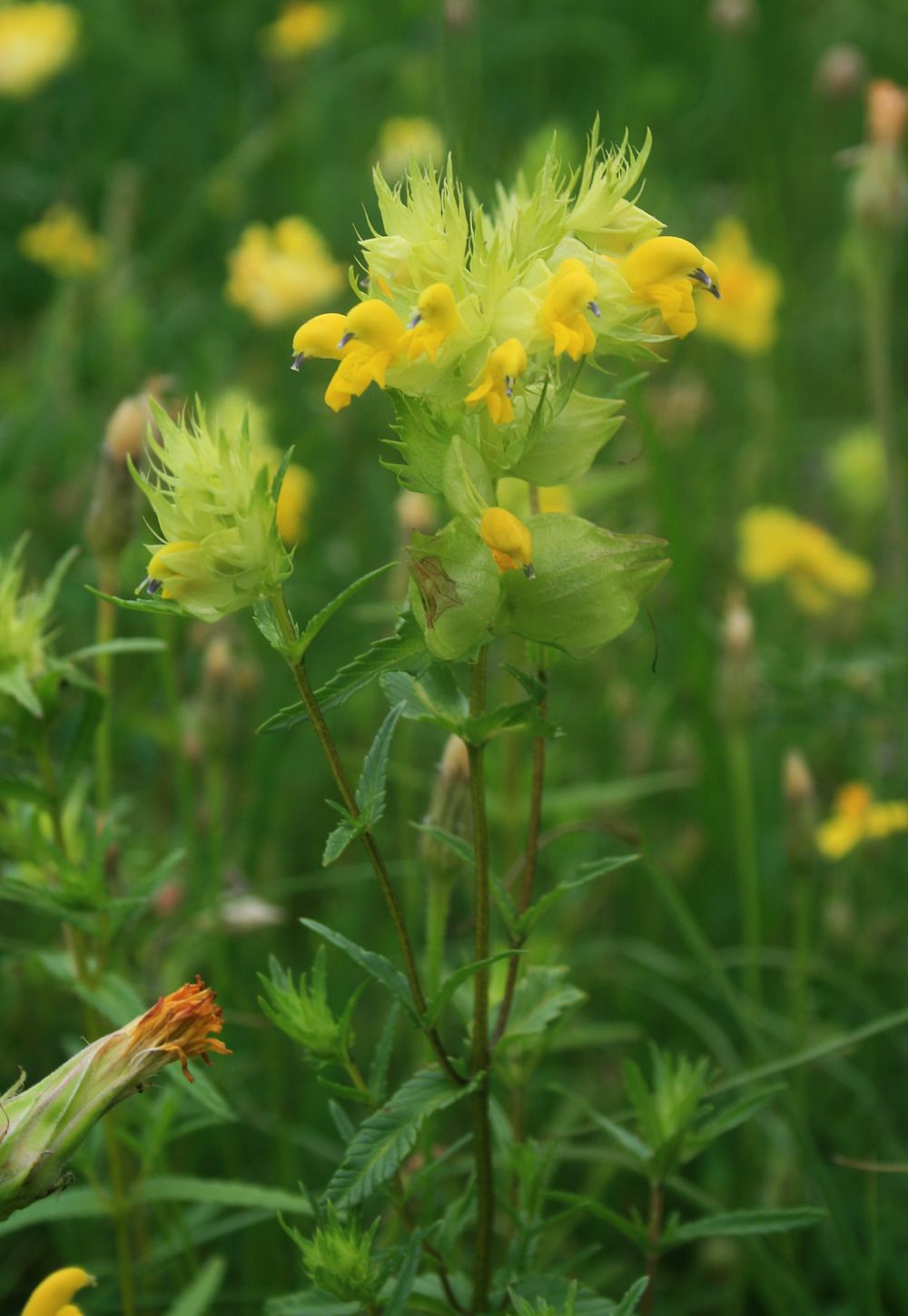

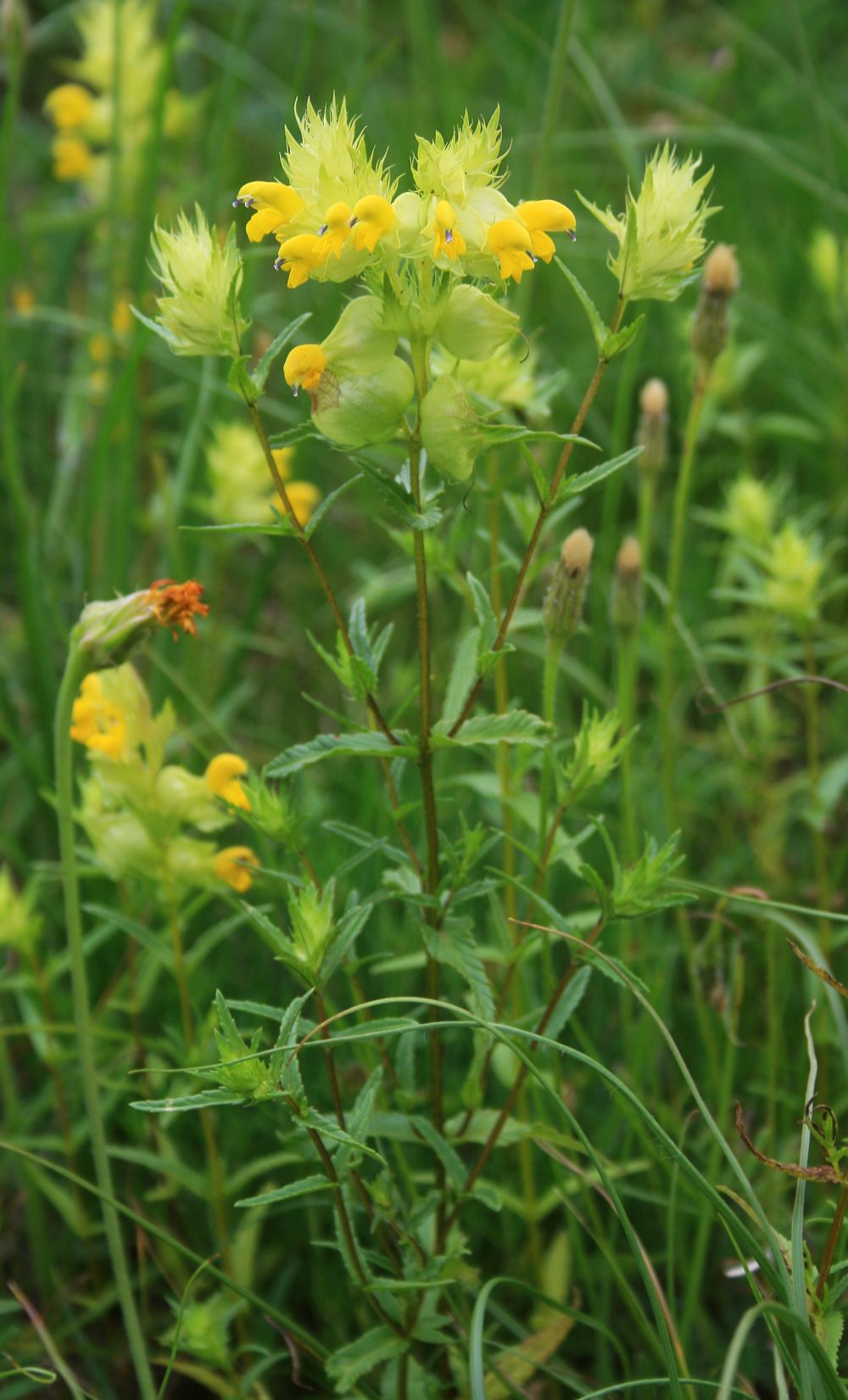

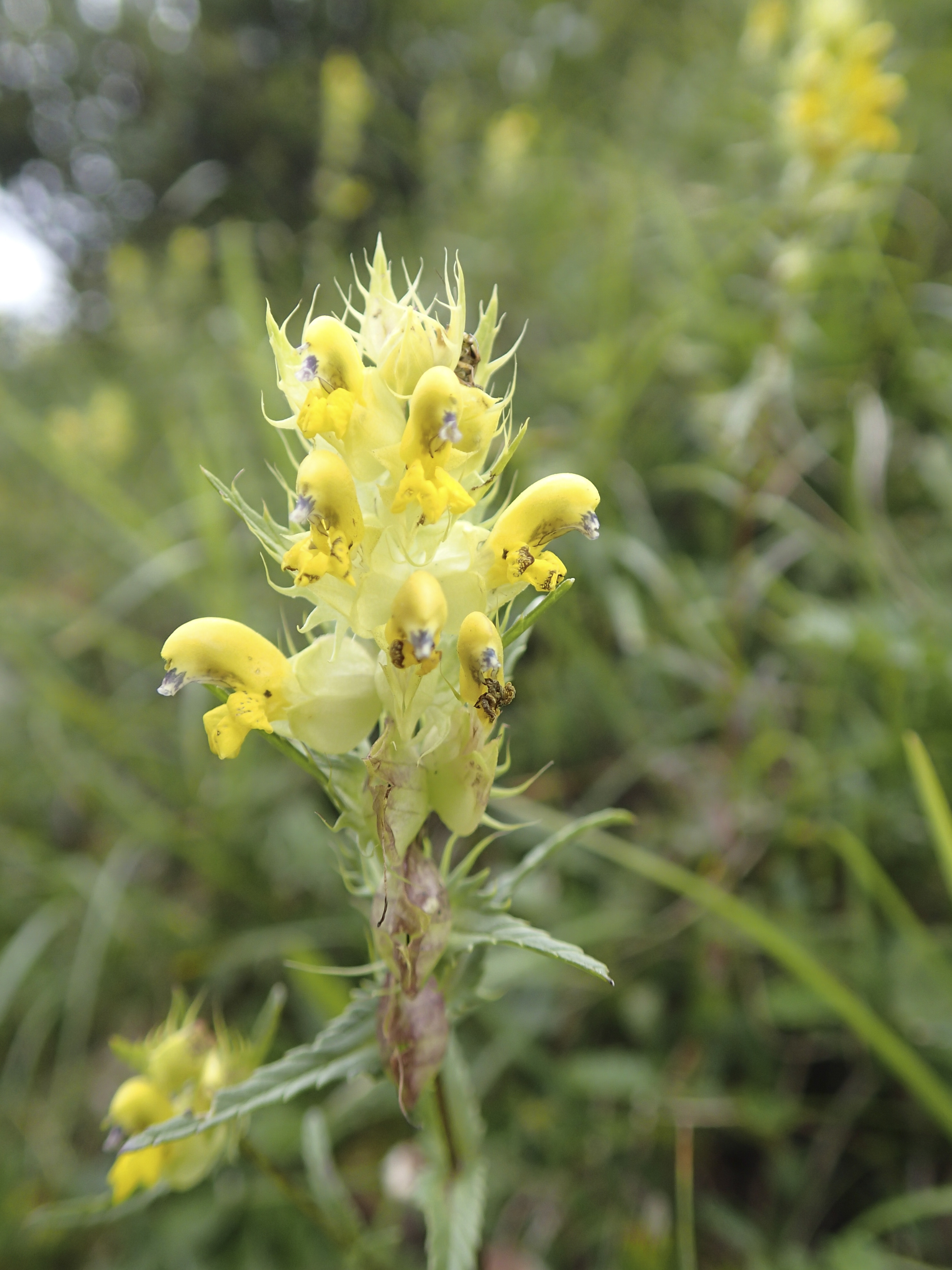

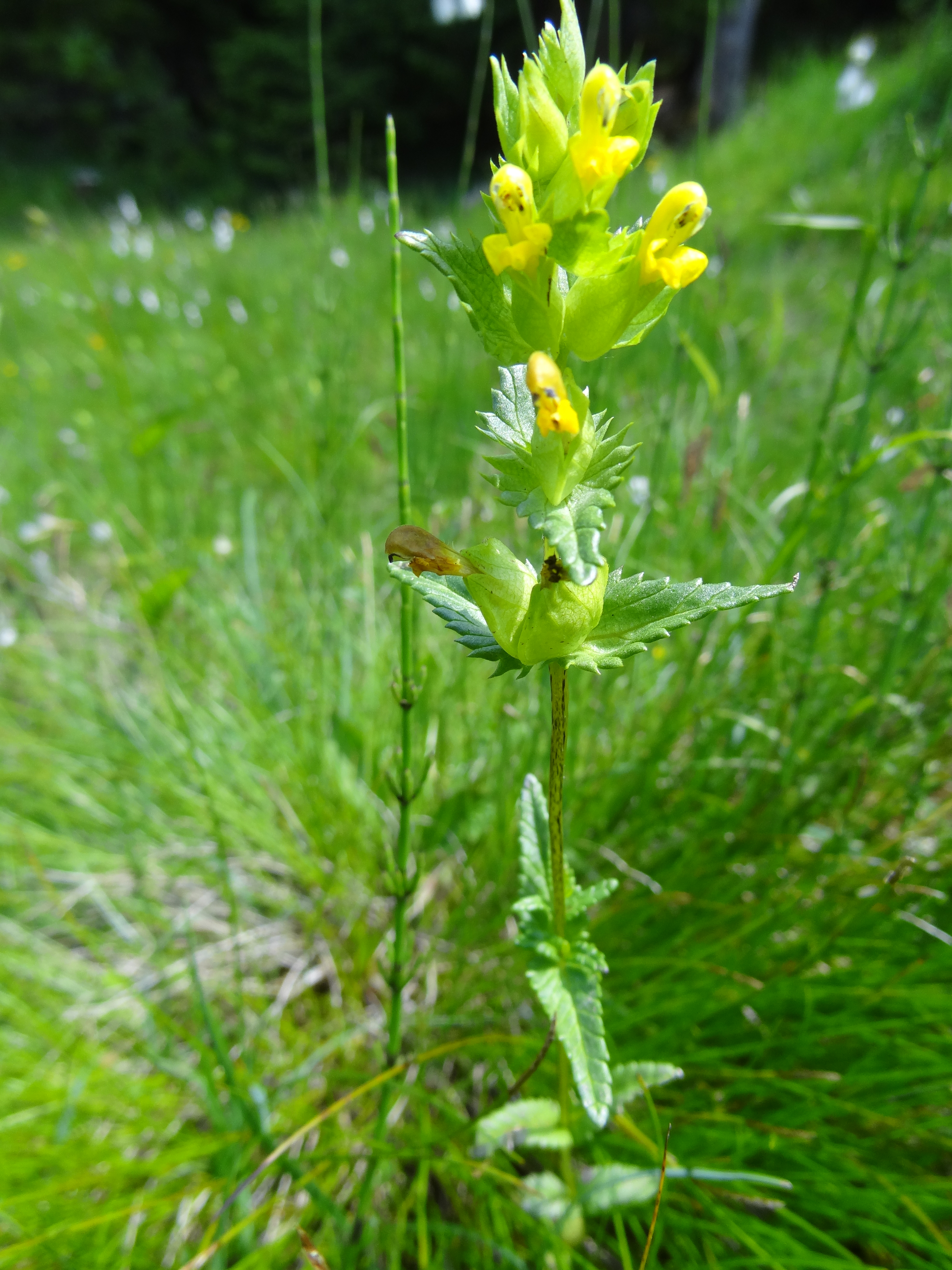

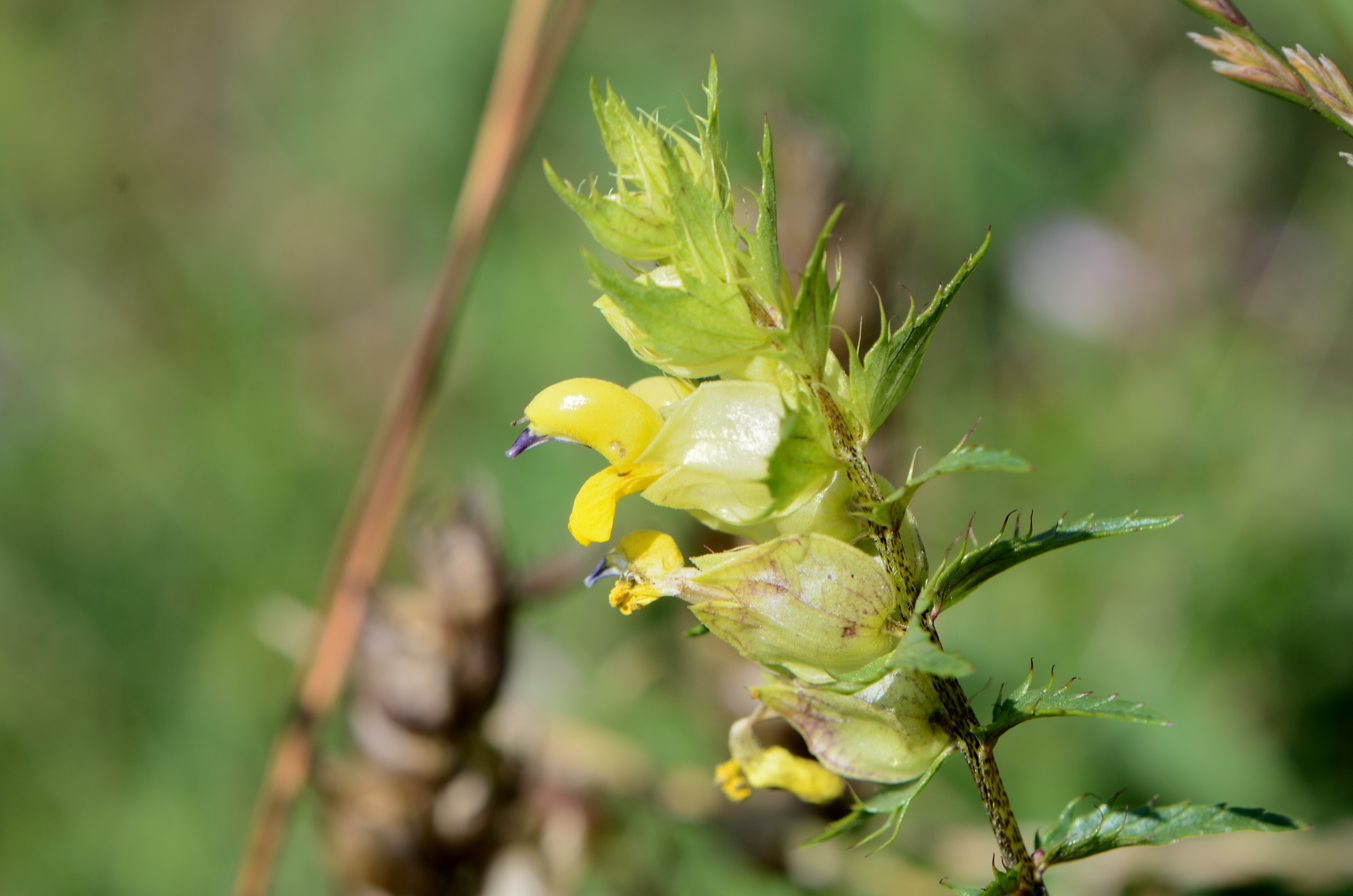

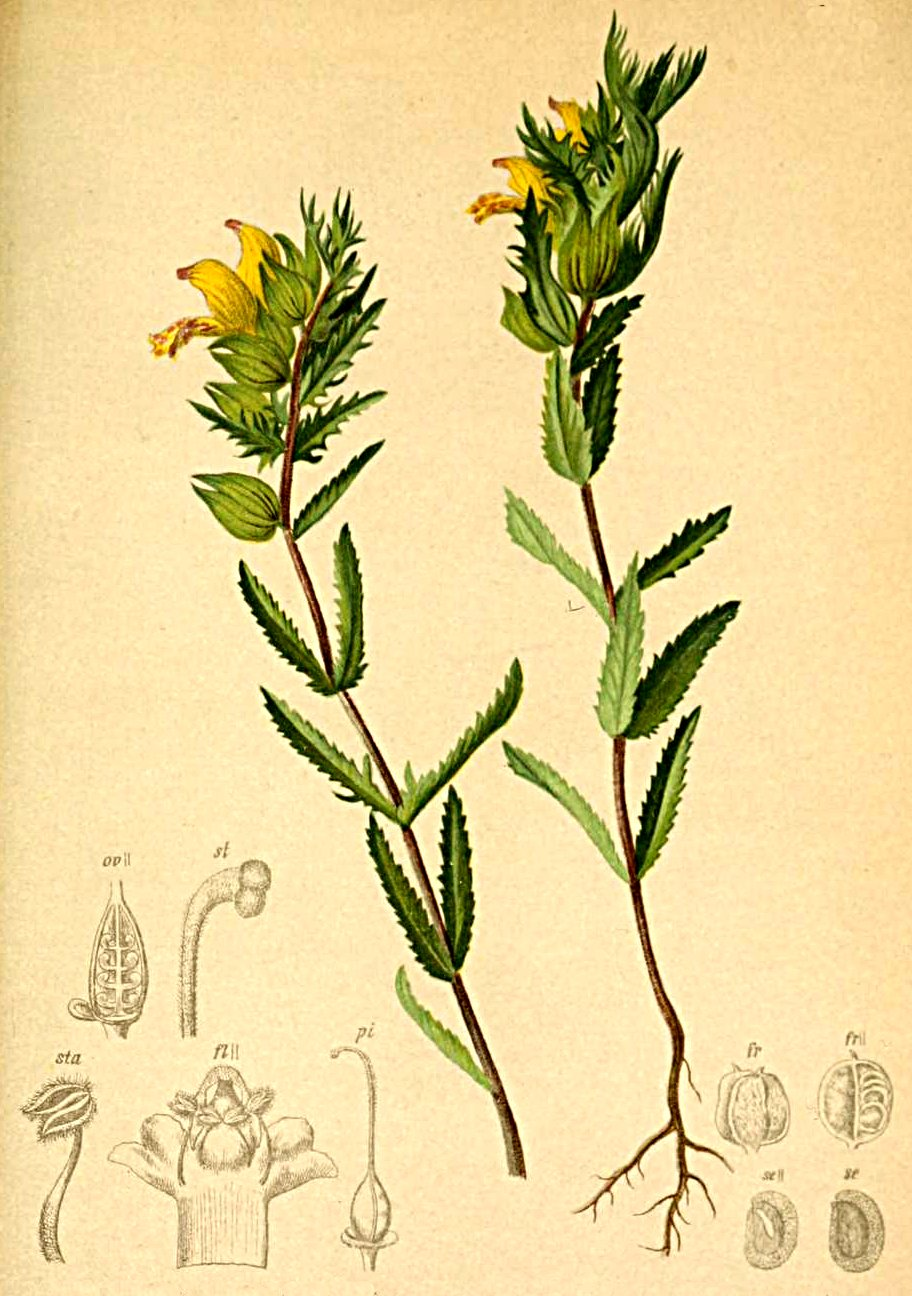
