= P. spicata =

P. spicata may refer to:

- Philotheca spicata, the pepper and salt, a shrub species
- Pimelea spicata, the pink pimelea, an endangered plant species native to New South Wales, Australia
- Polycarpaea spicata, a plant species endemic to Yemen
- Pseudoroegnaria spicata, the bluebunch wheatgrass, a plant species

== See also ==
- The dictionary definition of Spicata at Wiktionary
