= Timothée Puel =

French physician and botanist (1813-1890)

Jean Jacques Timothée Puel (August 22, 1813 – January 28, 1890) was a French physician and botanist.

A practicing physician in Paris, he was a founding member of the Société botanique de France (1854).

He is known for his investigations of flora native to the département of Lot, of which he published Catalogue des plantes qui croissent dans le département du Lot. Also, he issued several exsiccata series, among others Herbier du Lot., Herbier des Flores Locales de France. Avril 1856 and Plantes de France, the latter two with Alphonse Maille. The genus Puelia (family Gramineae) was named in his honor by Adrien René Franchet.

== Selected works ==
- Catalogue des plantes vasculaires qui croissent dans le département Lot, 1845-53 - Catalog of vascular plants native to the department of Lot.
- Catalogue des plantes qui croissent dans le département du Lot, 1852 - Catalog of plants native to the department of Lot.
- Études sur les divisions géographiques de la flore française, 1858-1860 - Studies of geographical divisions involving French flora.
- Revue critique de la flore du département du Lot, 1860-62 - Critical review on the flora of the department of Lot.
