= Asyneuma compactum =

Scientific classification
- Kingdom: Plantae
- Clade: Embryophytes
- Clade: Tracheophytes
- Clade: Spermatophytes
- Clade: Angiosperms
- Clade: Eudicots
- Clade: Asterids
- Order: Asterales
- Family: Campanulaceae
- Genus: Asyneuma
- Species: A. compactum

Binomial name
- Asyneuma compactum Damboldt

Varieties
- Asyneuma compactum var. eriocarpum Parolly; Asyneuma compactum var. compactum

Synonyms
- Campanula compacta Boiss. & Heldr.

Species of flowering plant

Asyneuma compactum is a species of flowering plant in the bellflower family (Campanulaceae) that grows exclusively in the Taurus Mountains of Turkey. This perennial alpine plant forms compact cushions of leaves in rocky, windswept habitats at elevations between 1,600 and 2,700 metres. It produces distinctive deep violet-blue flowers with petals that separate almost completely, a characteristic that distinguishes its genus from related bellflowers. The species exists in two varieties: the typical form (var. compactum) which prefers drier exposed sites, and var. eriocarpum, identified in 2000, which grows in more sheltered areas near melting snow with better soil conditions.

== Description ==
Asyneuma compactum is a perennial plant that forms dense, compact cushions with rosettes of leaves. The plant typically grows to modest heights, though some specimens can reach up to 20 cm tall depending on growing conditions. It has a stout taproot system that anchors it in rocky mountain terrain.

The plant's rosette leaves are narrow and somewhat spoon-shaped (spathulate), measuring about 2–3 millimetres (0.079–0.118 in) wide. The leaf margins may be entire or slightly toothed. Both the stems and leaves can vary in hairiness (indumentum), ranging from nearly hairless (glabrous) to moderately hairy depending on the population.

One of the plant's most distinctive features is its flowering stems, which are typically short and bear 1–3 flowers, though sometimes more. The flowers have a deep violet-blue corolla (the collective term for the petals) that is divided nearly to the base into narrow linear lobes. This nearly complete division of the corolla is characteristic of the genus Asyneuma and distinguishes it from the related genus Campanula (bellflowers).

The flowers undergo a developmental change during their life cycle: in early (male) stage, the corolla appears more tube-like and is divided only partway down, resembling Campanula flowers. Later, in the female stage, the petals separate completely into free lobes. The calyx (the outer green parts of the flower) has lobes that are 4–5 millimetres (0.16–0.20 in) long, about as long as the tube. The fruit is a capsule that opens by pores to release seeds.

== Habitat and distribution ==
Asyneuma compactum is endemic to Turkey, specifically to the western and central sectors of the Taurus Mountains. Its distribution includes several mountain ranges within this system: Davraz, Dedegöl, Sultan, Geyik, and Oyuklu. The species grows at elevations between 1,600 and 2,700 metres in alpine and subalpine zones. It inhabits exposed ridges and rocky slopes, primarily on limestone substrates, where it forms part of wind-swept cushion plant communities characterized by low vegetation cover (10–50%).

The two varieties show ecological differentiation, with var. compactum typically occupying drier habitats with minimal soil development, while var. eriocarpum has been documented in more sheltered positions near late-melting snow fields with better water and fine soil availability. Phytosociologically, these communities are classified within the Paronychion lycicae alliance (Drabo-Androsacetalia order, Astragalo-Brometea class), which encompasses the wind-beaten cushion communities of the Western Taurus mountains.

== Taxonomy ==
Asyneuma compactum was first described as a species by the botanists Pierre Edmond Boissier and Theodor Heinrich von Heldreich. The plant was later placed in the genus Asyneuma by taxonomist Jürgen Damboldt during his systematic revision of the genus, which he first presented in 1968 and further developed in subsequent works (1970, 1978).

The genus Asyneuma is closely related to Campanula (bellflowers) and Phyteuma, with the boundaries between these genera sometimes being contentious in botanical classification. According to Damboldt's generic concept, the major diagnostic features of Asyneuma include:

- A corolla that is more or less rotate (flat and wheel-shaped), with petals fused only at the base
- Free corolla lobes that are narrowly linear in shape
- Calyx appendages that are absent or only rudimentarily present
- A stigma that is divided into 2–3 (rarely 4) parts
- Capsules that are ovoid-oblong to more or less spherical (globose), opening by median or subapical pores

In Asyneuma compactum, these features are clearly present, though with the observation that calyx appendages are not completely lacking but rudimentarily present as five very minute protuberances at the edges of the ovary.

In 1971, the botanists Juliette Contandriopoulos and Louis-Victor Quézel described A. compactum subsp. glabrescens from Oyuklu Dağ, distinguishing it by its less hairy stems and leaves. However, this taxon was later reduced to synonymy with the typical form by Damboldt in 1978, as the distinguishing features fell within the normal range of variation observed in the species.

The variety eriocarpum, described by Gerald Parolly in 2000, is considered distinct enough to warrant varietal status but not separate specific rank. This classification decision was based on the general variability of A. compactum, the variability observed within var. eriocarpum populations themselves, and the fact that var. eriocarpum is not geographically isolated from other populations of A. compactum.
