= Polycarpaea balfourii =

Conservation status
- Least Concern (IUCN 3.1)

Scientific classification
- Kingdom: Plantae
- Clade: Tracheophytes
- Clade: Angiosperms
- Clade: Eudicots
- Order: Caryophyllales
- Family: Caryophyllaceae
- Genus: Polycarpaea
- Species: P. balfourii

Binomial name
- Polycarpaea balfourii Briq.

Species of flowering plant

Polycarpaea balfourii is a species of plant in the family Caryophyllaceae. It is endemic to Socotra in Yemen. Its natural habitats are subtropical or tropical dry shrubland and rocky areas.
