= Galium perralderii =

Scientific classification
- Kingdom: Plantae
- Clade: Embryophytes
- Clade: Tracheophytes
- Clade: Angiosperms
- Clade: Eudicots
- Clade: Asterids
- Order: Gentianales
- Family: Rubiaceae
- Genus: Galium
- Species: G. perralderii

Binomial name
- Galium perralderii Coss.

Species of flowering plant

Galium perralderii is a species of flowering plant, native to Algeria, in the family Rubiaceae.

This plant was first described in 1862 by Ernest Cosson. The specific epithet, perralderii, honours Cosson's friend and fellow botanist, Henri-René Le Tourneux de la Perraudière (1831–1861).
