= Pitardella =

Scientific classification
- Kingdom: Plantae
- Clade: Tracheophytes
- Clade: Angiosperms
- Clade: Eudicots
- Clade: Asterids
- Order: Gentianales
- Family: Rubiaceae
- Genus: Pitardella; Tirveng.

Genus of plants

Pitardella is a genus of flowering plants belonging to the family Rubiaceae.

It is native to Himalaya, Cambodia, Nepal, Thailand in Indo-China.

The genus name of Pitardella is in honour of Charles-Joseph Marie Pitard (1873–1927), an English painter and illustrator. It was first described and published in Biogeographica (The Hague) Vol.79 on page 32 in 2003.

== Known species ==
According to Kew:

- Pitardella caudatifolia (Pit.) Tirveng.
- Pitardella poilanei Tirveng.
- Pitardella sikkimensis (Hook.f.) Tirveng.
