= Polycarpaea caespitosa =

Conservation status
- Least Concern (IUCN 3.1)

Scientific classification
- Kingdom: Plantae
- Clade: Tracheophytes
- Clade: Angiosperms
- Clade: Eudicots
- Order: Caryophyllales
- Family: Caryophyllaceae
- Genus: Polycarpaea
- Species: P. caespitosa

Binomial name
- Polycarpaea caespitosa Balf.f.

Synonyms
- Polycarpon caespitosum (Balf.f.) Kuntze

Species of plant

Polycarpaea caespitosa is a species of plant in the family Caryophyllaceae. It is endemic to Socotra in Yemen. Its natural habitats are subtropical or tropical dry forests, subtropical or tropical dry shrubland, and rocky areas.
