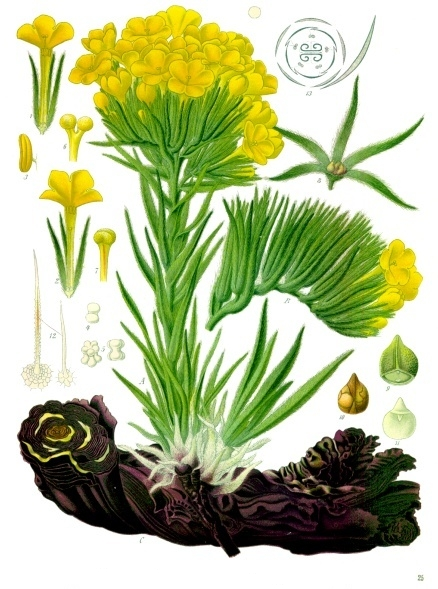

Scientific classification
- Kingdom: Plantae
- Clade: Embryophytes
- Clade: Tracheophytes
- Clade: Spermatophytes
- Clade: Angiosperms
- Clade: Eudicots
- Clade: Asterids
- Order: Boraginales
- Family: Boraginaceae
- Genus: Arnebia
- Species: A. densiflora

Binomial name
- Arnebia densiflora (Ledeb. ex Nordm.) Ledeb.

= Arnebia densiflora =

Species of flowering plant in the borage family

Arnebia densiflora, (also called Macrotomia cephalotes) is a plant species belonging to the family Boraginaceae. It is native to Greece and Turkey. Arnebia densiflora has been investigated for its wound-healing abilities.

== Etymology ==
Arnebia is the generic name derived from the Arabic name "shajaret el arneb". Densiflora is a Latin epithet that means "dense of flowers".

=== Synonyms ===
- Lithospermum densiflorum Ledeb.
- Macrotomia cephalotes (A. DC.) Boiss.
- Macrotomia densiflora (Ledeb.) McBride

== Description ==
Small clump-forming from a robust, somewhat woody rootstock with erect, hispid, unbranched stems 25–40 cm (9.8–15.7 in) high. Basal leaves linear elliptic to narrowly lanceolate, 10–15 cm (3.9–5.9 in) long with stalks to 4 cm (1.6 in); stem leaves smaller and sessile, velvety-hairy. Flowers are yellow, 3.5–4.5 cm (1.4–1.8 in) long by 1.2–1.6 cm (0.5–0.6 in) across densely planted on the ends of stems and branches. It flowers from early to late summer. All aerial parts are pubescent.

== Habitat ==
Arnebia densiflora prefers mountain areas and places with dry and sunny rocky soils. It is native to Greece and Turkey on volcanic or limestone slopes and cliffs at 750–2,600 m (2,460–8,530 ft).

== Medicinal use ==
Arnebia densiflora has been investigated for its wound healing abilities.

Arnebia densiflora is one of the five species of Boraginaceae family grown in Turkey. Several species of Boraginaceous plants are used as folk medicine in Turkey and eastern Mediterranean countries.

The pigmented root of Arnebia densiflora, known locally as 'Eyilik', is added to olive oil and applied on open wounds and cuts in Anatolia.

In Malatya, roots of Arnebia densiflora are dipped in butter. After removing the root pieces the butter is mixed with beeswax to prepare an ointment for open wounds. Roots of Arnebia densiflora are also used as a natural-dye to color Anatolian carpets.

The medicinal effect might have to do with the high naphthoquinone content in the roots barks.

== Taxonomy ==
Arnebia densiflora was first described by Carl Friedrich von Ledebour.

It was first published in Flora Rossica Enumeratio sive Plantarum in Totivs Imperii Rossici Provinciis europaeis, Asiaticis, et americanis Hucusque Observatarum 3 (1.8): 140. 1847
