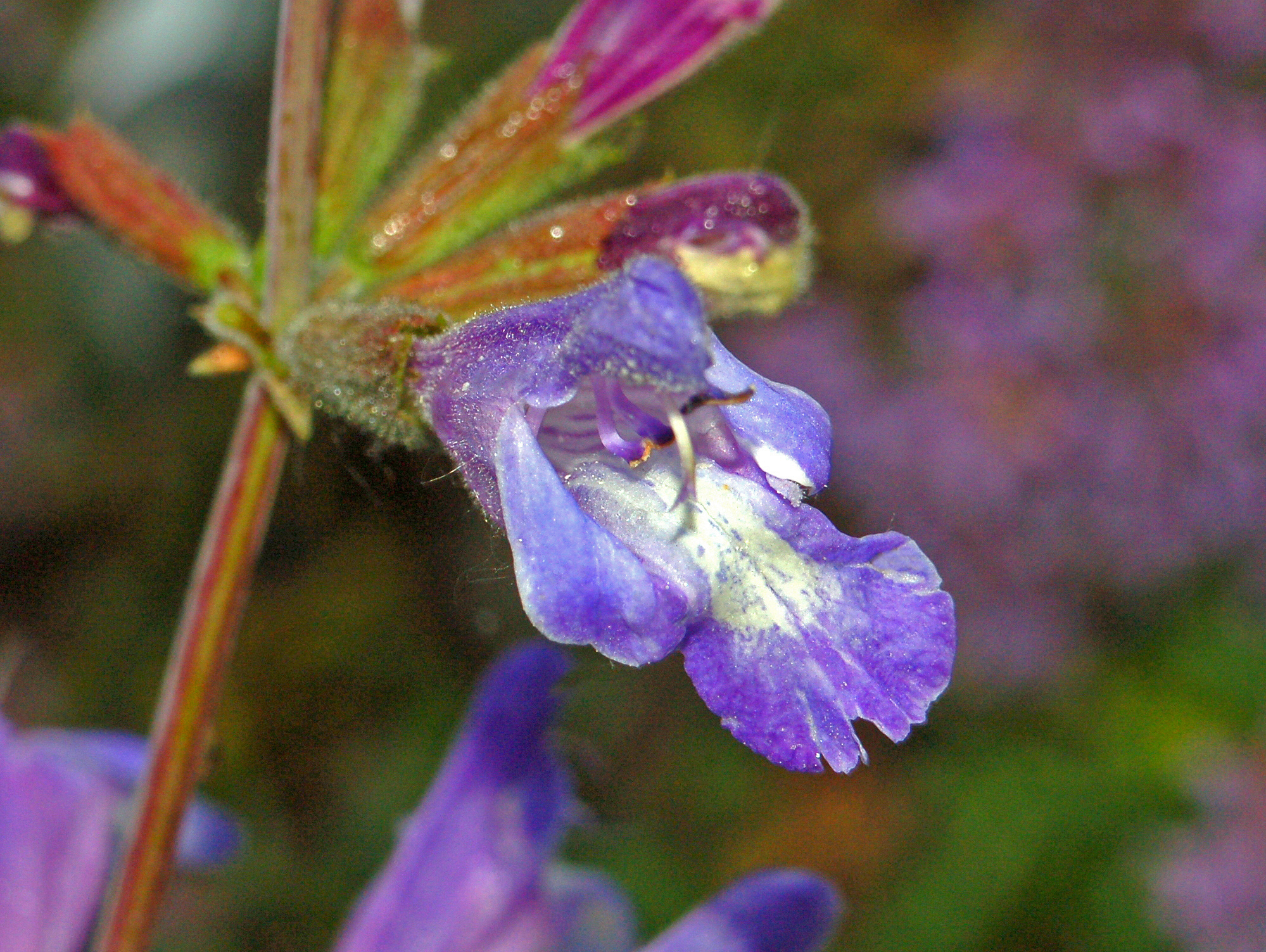
- Flower of Salvia interrupta at the botanical garden of Villa Durazzo-Pallavicini, Genova Pegli

Scientific classification
- Kingdom: Plantae
- Clade: Tracheophytes
- Clade: Angiosperms
- Clade: Eudicots
- Clade: Asterids
- Order: Lamiales
- Family: Lamiaceae
- Genus: Salvia
- Species: S. interrupta

Binomial name
- Salvia interrupta Schousb.

= Salvia interrupta =

Species of flowering plant

Salvia interrupta is a perennial plant belonging to the family Lamiaceae. It is native throughout the range of the Atlas Mountains in Morocco, growing between 1,300 to 1,500 ft (400 to 460 m) elevation in shaded arboreal forests and on limestone slopes.

== Description ==
Salvia interrupta has apple-green three-lobed leaves of various sizes, with short white hairs on the underside, with the plant appearing to grow in a basal rosette. The flower stalks grow to 2 ft, with verticils of 5–10 flowers growing on small peduncles that are widely spaced along the stalk. The spacing explains the plant's epithet, "interrupta", and contributes to the elegance of the flower stalk. The nearly 4 cm flowers are large and violet, with a wide lower lip that has at its center two distinct white lines leading insects to the pollen and nectar glands inside. The stalks are square when young, becoming round when mature, with two distinct dark purple-brown lines running up the length of the stalk. The plant is sometimes confused with Salvia candelabrum, which has undivided leaves as compared to S. interrupta, due to the similarity of the flower stalks. Salvia ringens also looks similar to S. interrupta— it has longer petioles and repeat blooms more frequently.

In cultivation, flowering usually begins in late spring or early summer and repeats heavily in October. The flower stalks last well as cut flowers. In his 1933 classic The English Flower Garden, William Robinson described Salvia interrupta as one of the most beautiful border plants. The dramatic flowering stalks tend to get lost in the midst of other plants, so it is better for the front of borders, where its tidy foliage can be seen when not in bloom. It also works well as a dramatic single specimen in a large pot.

== History ==
Salvia interrupta was first scientifically described in 1801 by the Danish botanist Peder Kofod Anker Schousboe, who was the Danish consul at Tangier from 1801 to 1832. Schousboe was an avid collector of plants for the University of Copenhagen Botanical Garden and described many species from Morocco and Mauritania. Prior to its formal 1801 description, it was first mentioned in an unofficial survey of Moroccan flora circa 1791–1793 by Schousboe. Soon after its discovery, S. interrupta was brought to Europe sometime before 1870. More than a hundred years later, the plant has become widely grown both in North America and continental Europe.
