= Asyneuma limonifolium =

Scientific classification
- Kingdom: Plantae
- Clade: Tracheophytes
- Clade: Angiosperms
- Clade: Eudicots
- Clade: Asterids
- Order: Asterales
- Family: Campanulaceae
- Genus: Asyneuma
- Species: A. limonifolium

Binomial name
- Asyneuma limonifolium (L.) Janch.

Species of plant

Asyneuma limonifolium (syn. Campanula limonifolia L., Phyteuma limonifolium (L.) Sm., Podanthum limonifolium (L.) Boiss.) is a species of flowering plant in the family Campanulaceae.

== Range ==
A. limonifolium is found in southeastern and mediterranean Europe, specifically in Greece, Turkey, Bulgaria and Serbia, on the Adriatic coast of Montenegro, Albania, Bosnia and Herzegovina and Croatia, as well as in Apulia region of Italy. A single specimen record exists from Portugal.

== Taxonomy ==
Asyneuma limonifolium contains the following subspecies:

- Asyneuma limonifolium subsp. pestalozzae
- Asyneuma limonifolium subsp. limonifolium
