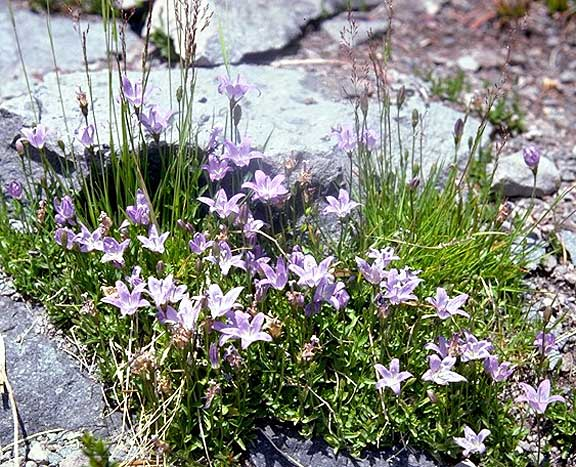

Conservation status
- Imperiled (NatureServe)

Scientific classification
- Kingdom: Plantae
- Clade: Tracheophytes
- Clade: Angiosperms
- Clade: Eudicots
- Clade: Asterids
- Order: Asterales
- Family: Campanulaceae
- Genus: Smithiastrum
- Species: S. wilkinsianum

Binomial name
- Smithiastrum wilkinsianum (Greene) Morin

Synonyms
- Campanula baileyi Eastw.; Campanula wilkinsiana Greene

= Smithiastrum wilkinsianum =

Species of flowering plant

Smithiastrum wilkinsianum is a rare species of bellflower known by the common name Wilkins' bellflower.

== Description ==
It is a perennial herb growing from a slender rhizome and producing an erect or leaning stem up to about 30 centimeters long. The plant is known to form dense colonies of many individuals. The thin, toothed leaves are between 1 and 2 centimeters long. The flower is bright blue to deep purple, funnel-shaped, and just over a centimeter long. The stigma is blue and protrudes from the mouth of the bloom.

This species was first collected by Lewanna Wilkins and named in her honor.

== Distribution and habitat ==
It is endemic to California, where it is known fewer than twenty scattered occurrences in the Klamath Mountains and Cascade Range, and possibly the northern peaks of the High Sierra. It grows in temperate coniferous forest and mountain meadows.
