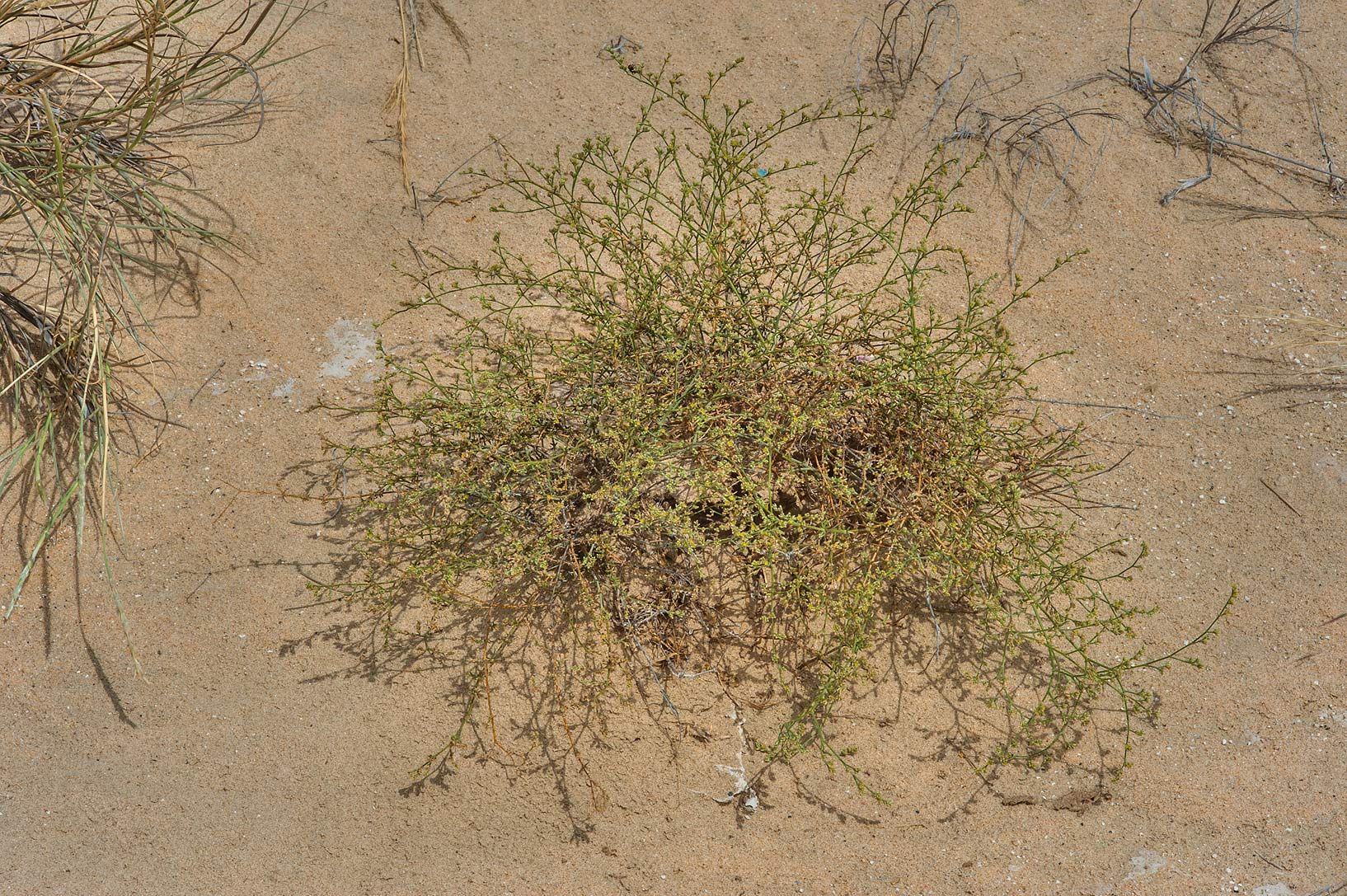
- Polycarpaea repens in southern Qatar

Scientific classification
- Kingdom: Plantae
- Clade: Tracheophytes
- Clade: Angiosperms
- Clade: Eudicots
- Order: Caryophyllales
- Family: Caryophyllaceae
- Genus: Polycarpaea
- Species: P. repens

Binomial name
- Polycarpaea repens (Forssk.) Asch. & Schweinf.

= Polycarpaea repens =

Species of plant

Polycarpaea repens is a low-growing herbaceous plant belonging to the Caryophyllaceae family. It is indigenous to arid and semi-arid regions across North Africa, the Arabian Peninsula, and into Pakistan.

== Description ==
Polycarpaea repens is an annual or short-lived perennial, with a woody base and spreading, slender branches. Its size ranges from 5 to 30 cm. It forms low, hairy, sprawling mats. Small leaves bear rough stipules, and its flowers are diminutive. The fruit is a small, many-seeded capsule.

== Habitat ==
This species typically occupies sandy or stony soils and is frequently found in sabkha margins, sand sheets, and gravel plains.

== Distribution ==
It naturally occurs from the Sahara through the Persian Gulf States to Pakistan.

== Folk use ==
In Qatar, local Bedouin accounts note its traditional use in treating camel mange and as an antidote for snakebites.
