= Polycarpaea kuriensis =

Conservation status
- Vulnerable (IUCN 3.1)

Scientific classification
- Kingdom: Plantae
- Clade: Tracheophytes
- Clade: Angiosperms
- Clade: Eudicots
- Order: Caryophyllales
- Family: Caryophyllaceae
- Genus: Polycarpaea
- Species: P. kuriensis

Binomial name
- Polycarpaea kuriensis R.Wagner

Species of flowering plant

Polycarpaea kuriensis is a species of plant in the family Caryophyllaceae. It is endemic to the islands of Socotra, Samhah, and Abd al Kuri in Yemen's Socotra Archipelago. Its natural habitats are subtropical or tropical dry shrubland and rocky areas.
