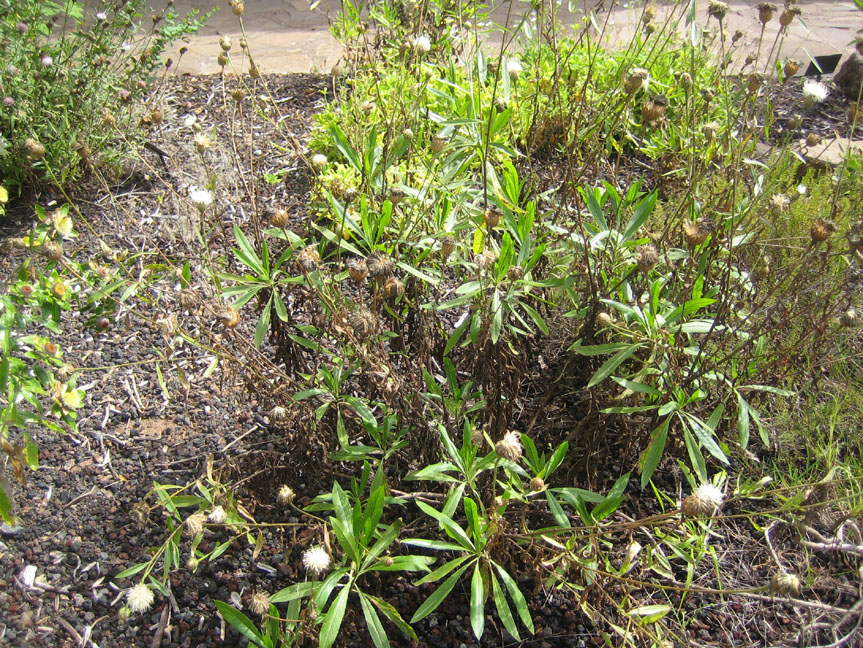
- Polycarpaea filifolia

Scientific classification
- Kingdom: Plantae
- Clade: Tracheophytes
- Clade: Angiosperms
- Clade: Eudicots
- Order: Caryophyllales
- Family: Caryophyllaceae
- Genus: Polycarpaea; Lam. (1792)

Synonyms
- Aylmeria Mart. (1826); Calycotropis Turcz. (1862); Hagaea Vent. (1799); Hyala L'Hér. ex DC. (1828); Lahaya Schult. (1819); Mollia Willd. (1803), nom. illeg.; Polia Lour. (1790); Polium Stokes (1812); Reesia Ewart (1913); Robbairea Boiss. (1867)

= Polycarpaea =

Genus of flowering plants

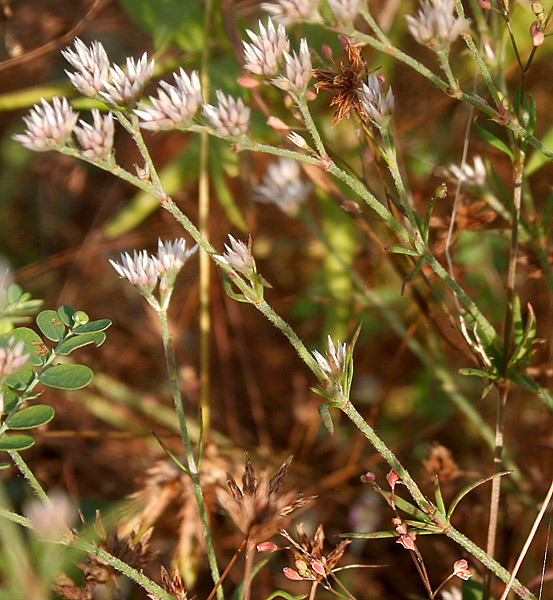
Polycarpaea corymbosa

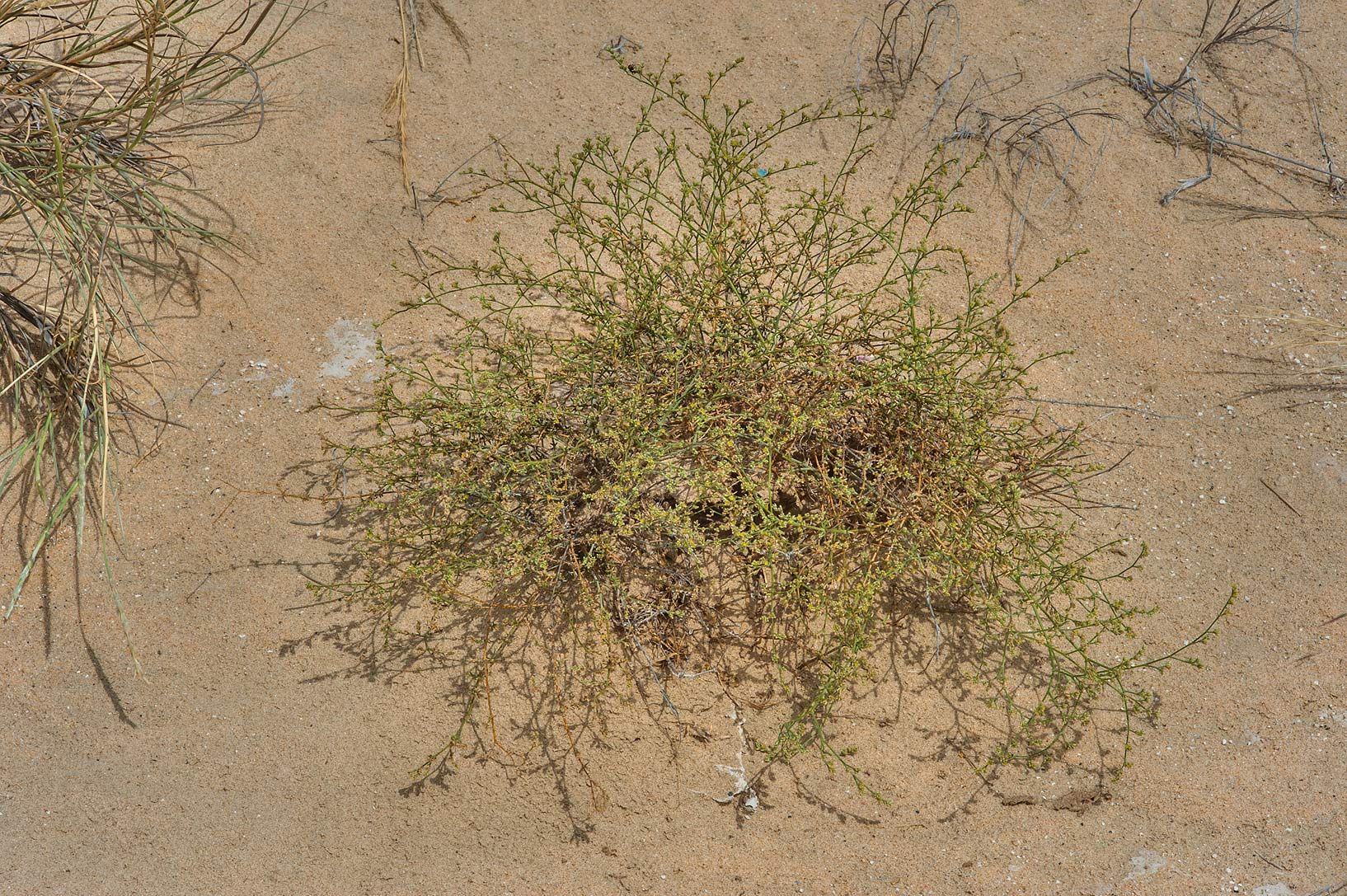
Polycarpaea repens

Polycarpaea is a genus of plants in the family Caryophyllaceae. It contains 79 species native to tropical and subtropical regions of South America, Africa and Madagascar, the Indian subcontinent, Indochina, southern China, Taiwan, the Philippines, New Guinea, and Australia. The genus was named by Jean-Baptiste Lamarck in 1792.

Molecular phylogenetic analysis showed that the genus is polyphyletic and needs to be redefined. It falls into three distinct clades. One of these, a group of species related to P. corymbosa, has acquired the C_{4} photosynthetic pathway.

== Species ==
79 species are accepted.

- Polycarpaea akkensis Coss. ex Maire.
- Polycarpaea angustipetala H.Perrier
- Polycarpaea arenaria Gagnep.
- Polycarpaea arida Pedley
- Polycarpaea aristata Chr.Sm.
- Polycarpaea aurea (Wight) Wight & Arn. ex B.D.Jacks.
- Polycarpaea balfourii Briq.
- Polycarpaea barbellata V.S.A.Kumar, S.Arya, V.Suresh & Alen Alex
- Polycarpaea basaltica Thulin
- Polycarpaea billei Lebrun
- Polycarpaea breviflora F.Muell.
- Polycarpaea caboverdeana Rivas Mart., Lousã, J.C.Costa & Maria C.Duarte
- Polycarpaea caespitosa Balf.f.
- Polycarpaea carnosa Chr.Sm.
- Polycarpaea clavifolia M.Gilbert.
- Polycarpaea corymbosa (L.) Lam.
- Polycarpaea diffusa Wight ex Arn.
- Polycarpaea divaricata Aiton.
- Polycarpaea douliotii Danguy
- Polycarpaea ebracteata S.Arya, V.S.A.Kumar, V.Suresh & Alen Alex
- Polycarpaea eriantha Hochst. ex A.Rich.
- Polycarpaea fallax Pedley
- Polycarpaea filifolia Webb ex Christ.
- Polycarpaea gamopetala Berhaut
- Polycarpaea garuensis J.-P.Lebrun
- Polycarpaea gaudichaudii Gagnepain.
- Polycarpaea gayi Webb.
- Polycarpaea grahamii Turrill
- Polycarpaea guardafuiensis M.Gilbert.
- Polycarpaea hassalensis D.F.Chamb.
- Polycarpaea haufensis A.G.Mill.
- Polycarpaea hayoides D.F.Chamb.
- Polycarpaea helichrysoides H.Perrier
- Polycarpaea holtzei Maiden & Betche
- Polycarpaea inaequalifolia Engl. & Gilg
- Polycarpaea incana Cowie
- Polycarpaea involucrata F.Muell.
- Polycarpaea jazirensis R.A.Clement
- Polycarpaea kuriensis Wagner
- Polycarpaea latifolia Poiret.
- Polycarpaea linearifolia (DC.) DC.
- Polycarpaea longiflora F.Muell.
- Polycarpaea majumdariana Venu, Muthuk. & P.Daniel
- Polycarpaea microceps Cowie
- Polycarpaea multicaulis Cowie
- Polycarpaea nivea Aiton.
- Polycarpaea palakkadensis V.S.A.Kumar, Sindhu Arya & V.Suresh
- Polycarpaea paulayana Wagner
- Polycarpaea philippioides H.Perrier
- Polycarpaea pobeguinii Berhaut
- Polycarpaea poggei Pax
- Polycarpaea psammophila V.Suresh, V.S.A.Kumar, S.Arya & Alen Alex
- Polycarpaea pulvinata M.Gilbert.
- Polycarpaea rangaiahiana Geethakum., Deepu & Viji
- Polycarpaea repens (Forsskal) Ascherson & Schweinf.
- Polycarpaea rheophytica Cheek
- Polycarpaea robbairea (Kunze) Greuter & Burdet.
- Polycarpaea robusta (Pit.) G.Kunkel
- Polycarpaea rosulans (Gagnep.) Gagnep.
- Polycarpaea rubioides H.Perrier
- Polycarpaea smithii Link.
- Polycarpaea somalensis Engl.
- Polycarpaea spicata Wight ex Arn.
- Polycarpaea spirostylis F.Muell.
- Polycarpaea staminodina F.Muell.
- Polycarpaea stellata (Willd.) Coyte
- Polycarpaea stylosa Gagnep.
- Polycarpaea sumbana K.Bakker
- Polycarpaea tenax Cowie
- Polycarpaea tenuifolia (Willd.) Coyte
- Polycarpaea tenuis Webb ex Christ.
- Polycarpaea tenuistyla Turrill
- Polycarpaea thymoidea Gagnep.
- Polycarpaea timorensis K.Bakker
- Polycarpaea umbrosa R.L.Barrett
- Polycarpaea ventiversa M.Gilbert.
- Polycarpaea violacea (Mart.) Benth.
- Polycarpaea zollingeri (Fenzl) K.Bakker
