= Jacques Nicolas Ernest Germain de Saint-Pierre =

French botanist (1814-1882)

Jacques Nicolas Ernest Germain de Saint-Pierre (1 December 1814, Saint-Pierre-le-Moûtier – 28 June 1882, Hyères) was a French botanist. The plant genera Diserneston of the family Apiaceae and Ernestella and Saintpierrea of the family Rosaceae were named in his honor.

He was one of fifteen founding members of Société botanique de France (SBF), an institution that was established on 24 May 1854.

== Publications ==
- Atlas de la Flore des Environs de Paris (Atlas of the flora in environs around Paris), with Ernest Cosson (1819-1889), 1845
- Guide du botaniste ou Conseil pratique sur l'étude de la botanique (Botanist's guide or practical counsel on the study of botany), edited by Victor Masson, 1852
- Nouveau Dictionnaire de botanique comprenant la description des familles naturelles, les propriétés médicales et les usages économiques des plants, la morphologie et la biologie des végétaux (New dictionary of botany including the description of natural families, medical properties and economic uses of plants, morphology and biology of plants), 1870.
