= Polycarpaea paulayana =

Conservation status
- Vulnerable (IUCN 3.1)

Scientific classification
- Kingdom: Plantae
- Clade: Tracheophytes
- Clade: Angiosperms
- Clade: Eudicots
- Order: Caryophyllales
- Family: Caryophyllaceae
- Genus: Polycarpaea
- Species: P. paulayana

Binomial name
- Polycarpaea paulayana R.Wagner

Species of flowering plant

Polycarpaea paulayana is a species of plant in the family Caryophyllaceae. It is endemic to northern Socotra and Samhah in Yemen's Socotra Archipelago. Its natural habitat is subtropical or tropical dry shrubland.
