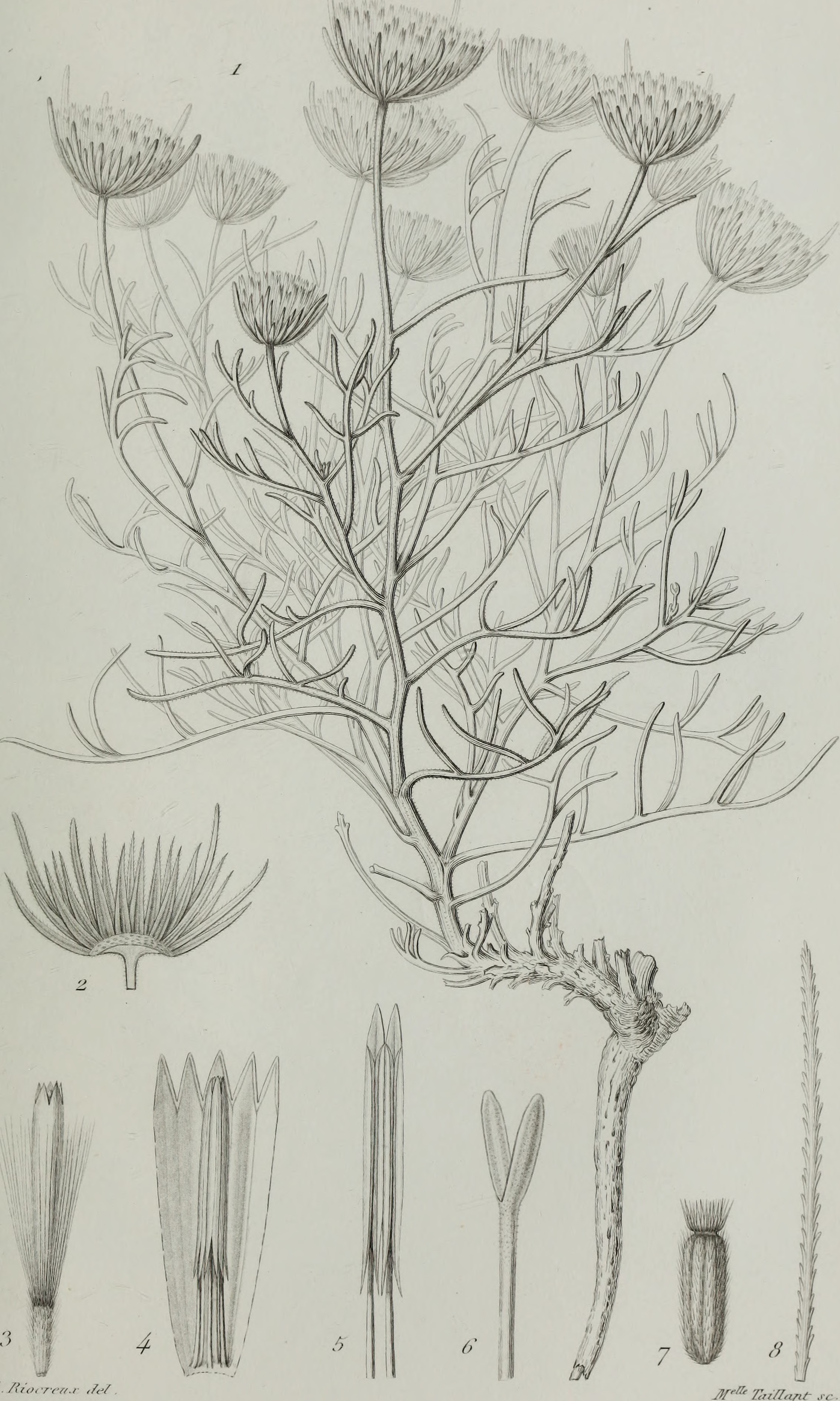
- Perralderia

Scientific classification
- Kingdom: Plantae
- Clade: Tracheophytes
- Clade: Angiosperms
- Clade: Eudicots
- Clade: Asterids
- Order: Asterales
- Family: Asteraceae
- Subfamily: Asteroideae
- Tribe: Inuleae
- Genus: Perralderia; Coss.

Type species
- Perralderia coronopifolia Coss.

= Perralderia =

Genus of flowering plants

Perralderia is a genus of flowering plants in the daisy family and is native to Africa. In particular, it is native to Algeria, Libya, Morocco, and Western Sahara.

In naming the genus, Perralderia, Ernest Cosson was honouring his friend Henri Letourneux de la Perraudiere (a fellow botanist).

== Species ==
As of November 2023, Plants of the World Online recognised three species:

- Perralderia coronopifolia Coss.
- Perralderia garamantum Asch.
- Perralderia paui Font Quer
