= Alphonse Maille =

French botanist

Alphonse Maille (1813 in Rouen – 30 September 1865 in Paris) was a French botanist.

In Paris, he studied botany under Adrien-Henri de Jussieu and worked on exsiccatae with Timothée Puel. In 1854 he was a founding member of the Société botanique de France.

During his career he assembled an important herbarium of approximately 1000 packages that contained about 60,000 species. After his death, botanist Jean-Louis Kralik published a catalog of Maille's collections as "Catalogue Des Reliquiae Mailleanae" (1869) and distributed his specimens as exsiccata Reliquiae Mailleanae.

In 1842 the grass genus Maillea (synonym Phleum, family Poaceae) was named in his honor by Filippo Parlatore.
