= Polycarpaea hassalensis =

Conservation status
- Vulnerable (IUCN 3.1)

Scientific classification
- Kingdom: Plantae
- Clade: Tracheophytes
- Clade: Angiosperms
- Clade: Eudicots
- Order: Caryophyllales
- Family: Caryophyllaceae
- Genus: Polycarpaea
- Species: P. hassalensis

Binomial name
- Polycarpaea hassalensis D.F.Chamb.

Species of flowering plant

Polycarpaea hassalensis is a species of plant in the family Caryophyllaceae. It is endemic to the island of Abd al Kuri in Yemen's Socotra Archipelago. Its natural habitats are subtropical or tropical dry shrubland and rocky areas.
