= Jean-Louis Kralik =

French botanist

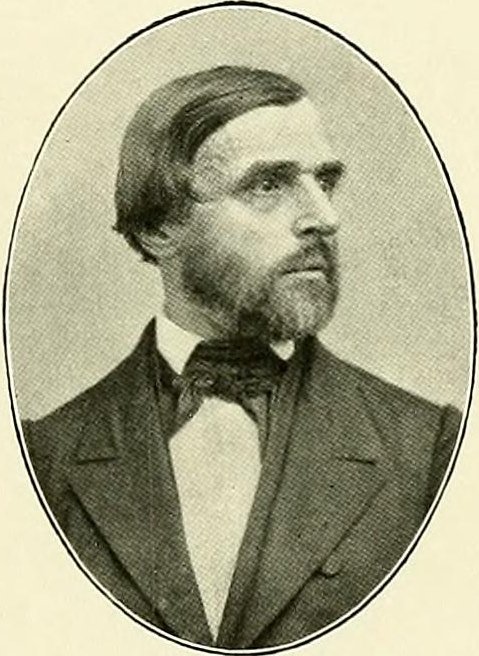
Jean-Louis Kralik

Jean-Louis Kralik (1813, Strasbourg – 1892, Tresserve) was a French botanist.

He worked as a professor in Strasbourg, and for a period of time was curator of Philip Barker Webb's herbarium. From 1855 to 1885 he was curator of Ernest Cosson's herbarium. As a botanical collector, he conducted extensive investigation of North African flora on expeditions to Algeria, Tunisia and Egypt. Kralik distributed herbarium specimens in several exsiccatae, among others Plantes Corses 1849, Reliquiae Mailleanae and Algae Schousboeanae.. The later two series distributed material collected by the botanists Alphonse Maille and Peter Schousboe.

The genus Kralikia (synonym Tripogon) was named in his honor by Cosson and Michel Charles Durieu de Maisonneuve.

== Published works ==
- Catalogue des plantes observées en Syrie et en Palestine de décembre 1850 à avril 1851, (with Louis Félicien de Saulcy, Ernest Cosson and Jean-Hippolyte Michon) - Catalog of plants seen in Syria and Palestine from December 1850 to April 1851.
- Notes sur quelques plantes rares ou nouvelles : recueillies, en 1854, par M.L. Kralik dans le sud de la régence de Tunis, (with Ernest Cosson); 1857 - Notes on some new and rare plants, collected in 1854 in the south of the Régence de Tunis.
- Catalogue Des Reliquiae Mailleanae (1869) - A catalogue of the herbarium collections of Alphonse Maille.
