= Société botanique de France =

French learned society

The Société botanique de France (SBF) is a French learned society founded on 23 April 1854. At its inaugural meeting it stated its purpose as "to contribute to the progress of botany and related sciences and to facilitate, by all means at its disposal, the education and the work of its members" (Article 2 of the founding statutes).

== Foundation ==
The creation of the society was a result of a meeting on 12 March 1854 of the following sixteen botanists, who became founding members:

- Antoine François Passy (1792–1873)
- Adolphe Brongniart (1801–1876), professor at the Muséum national d'histoire naturelle
- Joseph Decaisne (1807–1882), professor at the Muséum national d'histoire naturelle
- Horace Bénédict Alfred Moquin-Tandon (1801–1863)
- Count Hippolyte Jaubert (1798–1874)
- Louis Graves (1791–1857), director general of forests
- Vicomte de Noé
- Timothée Puel (1812–1890)
- Charles Philippe Robin (1821–1885), former Chief Inspector of Roads and Bridges
- Alphonse Maille (1813–1865)
- Ernest Saint-Charles Cosson (1819–1889)
- Pierre Étienne Simon Duchartre (1811–1894)
- Wladimir de Schoenefeld (1816–1875)
- Adolphe De Bouis (1804–1878), doctor of medicine
- Jacques Nicolas Ernest Germain de Saint-Pierre (1815–1882)
- François Simon Cordier (1797–1874), former Army doctor and botanist

Three of these participants, L. Graves, A. Passy and W. de Schoenefeld, formed a committee and established society rules inspired by the Société géologique de France in whose creation Louis Graves had taken part. The Société géologique de France also hosted the first meeting of the SBF. During the first official meeting, which took place on 24 May 1854, a committee was elected. It included A. Brongniart as president, J. Decaisne, D. Delessert and H. Moquin-Tandon as Vice-Presidents, W. de Schoenefeld and P. Duchartre as Secretaries, T. Puel and E. Cosson as vice-secretaries, Caillette de Hervilliers as treasurer and de Bouis as archivist.

In 1868 the SBF relocated to the new premises of the National Horticultural Society of France before moving, in 1949, into the premises of the Faculté de pharmacie de Paris. It was recognized as a public utility by decree of 17 August 1875. In the 1920s, several plant collections held by the Society were placed in various institutions for the conservation that the Society was not able to provide.

== Publications ==
Since its foundation it has published the proceedings of its ordinary and extraordinary meetings and a review of literature. Extraordinary meetings are held in various cities in France so that members from outside Paris can also participate in the activities of the society. Botanical excursions within France and abroad have regularly been organized. Currently SBF has two publications: Acta Botanica (quarterly), including a significant number of subscriptions from institutions, and Journal de Botanique, issued as need arises and where in particular reports are published on botanical excursions (the most recent having been held in Cyprus in the Forez and Morocco).

The SBF also regularly presents various awards and prizes including, since 1904, the Prix de Coincy (in honour of the botanist Auguste Henri Cornut de la Fontaine de Coincy (1837–1903)), given in recognition of research in taxonomy.

The Society had 162 members in the first year, since when membership has varied between 500 and 800. The society has been open to women from the beginning, the first woman member having been Elisa Vilmorin (d. 1868), the widow of Louis de Vilmorin (1816–1860).

== Recent activities ==
In 2001 SBF launched a project on the development of a flora of France. In 2004 the hundred and fiftieth anniversary symposium took place, attended by 105 people. In addition to a historical survey of the Society's role in presenting botany in France, its future and its educational mission were also reasserted.

== Source and references ==
- François Pellegrin, '"Un siècle de Société de botanique de France", Bulletin de la Société botanique de France, supplément to issue number 101, 1954, pp. 17–46.
