= Peter Schousboe =

Danish botanist (1766–1832)

Peter Schousboe (1766–1832) was a Danish botanist.

== Biography ==
Peder Kofod Anker Schousboe was born on 17 August 1766 in Rønne, Denmark and died in Tangier, Morocco, having served as Danish consul general in Tangier from 1800 onwards. He conducted a botanical expedition in Spain and Morocco during the years 1791-93. In 1800, he published his major work Om Væxtriget i Marokko. Among the plants that he was the first to describe was the popular garden flower Salvia interrupta; the bushwillow genus Schousboea (now considered a synonym of Combretum) was named in his honour. In 1883 the botanist Jean-Louis Kralik issued an exsiccata under the title Algae Schousboeanae distributing specimens collected by Schousboe.
