= Polycarpaea spicata =

Conservation status
- Least Concern (IUCN 3.1)

Scientific classification
- Kingdom: Plantae
- Clade: Tracheophytes
- Clade: Angiosperms
- Clade: Eudicots
- Order: Caryophyllales
- Family: Caryophyllaceae
- Genus: Polycarpaea
- Species: P. spicata

Binomial name
- Polycarpaea spicata Wight ex Arn.

Species of flowering plant

Polycarpaea spicata is a species of plant in the family Caryophyllaceae. Its natural habitats are subtropical or tropical dry forests and subtropical or tropical dry shrubland. Distribution; Northwest of India, Arabia, Egypt, and Northern Australia.

Annual herb, with woody taproot. Stems 5–10 cm, erect to ascending, slender, many, arising from the base, purplish-brown, glabrous. Leaves 5-15 x 3-5 somewhat thick, obovate to spathulate, basal leaves forming a rosette, cauline apparently whorled at the nodes, at the point of branching. Stipules lanceolate, lacerate, acuminate. Flowers sessile in dense, terminal spikes with long peduncles. Sepals 2.5–3 mm, lanceolate, with a brown midrib at the back. Petals small, oblong. Capsule included, about ½ the length of the sepals. Seeds small, subtrigonous, and shining.
