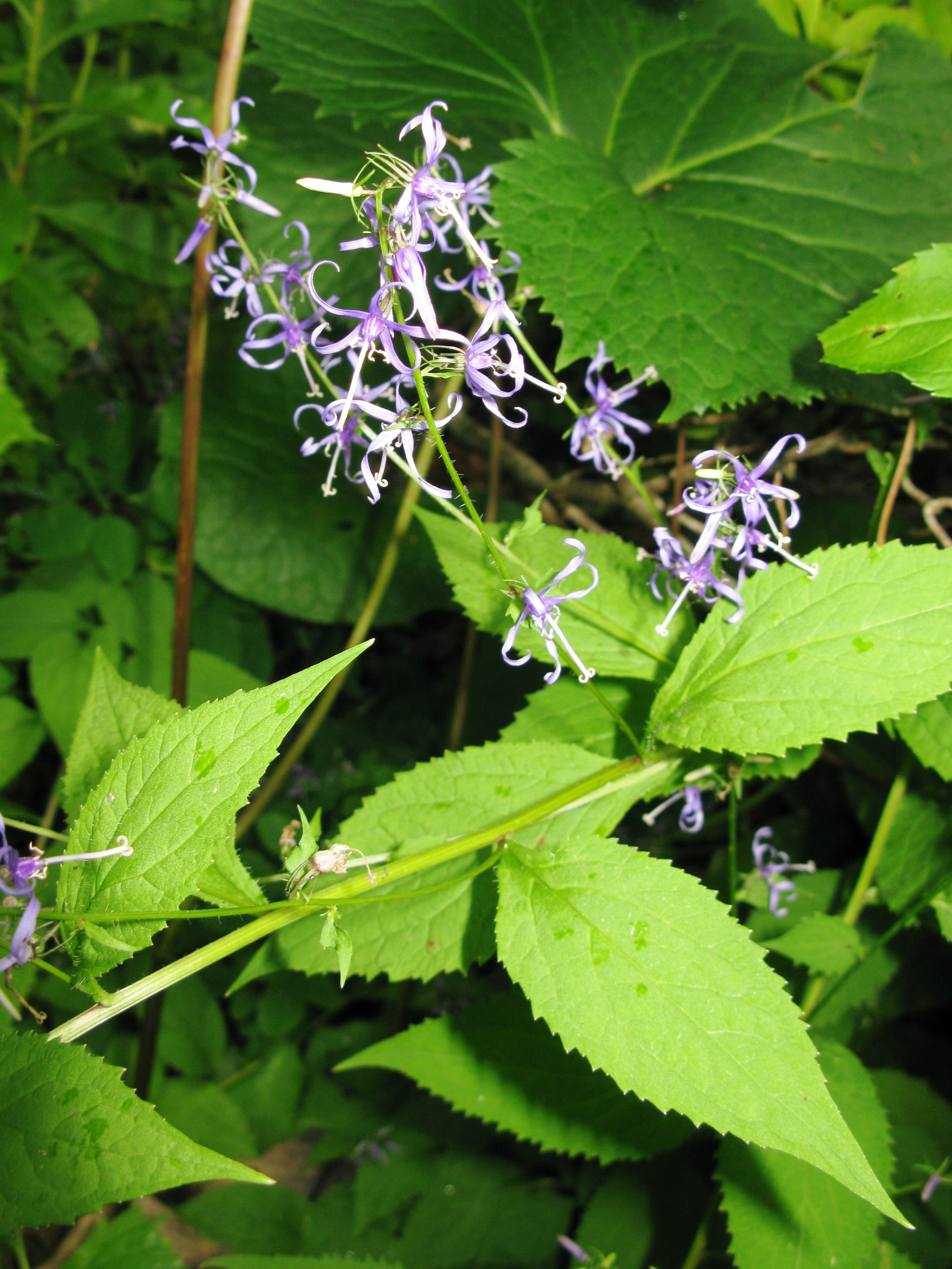
- Asyneuma japonicum

Scientific classification
- Kingdom: Plantae
- Clade: Tracheophytes
- Clade: Angiosperms
- Clade: Eudicots
- Clade: Asterids
- Order: Asterales
- Family: Campanulaceae
- Subfamily: Campanuloideae
- Genus: Asyneuma; Griseb. & Schenk

Synonyms
- Tracanthelium Kit. ex Schur; Podanthum Boiss.; Trochocodon Candargy; Asyneumopsis Contandr., Quézel & Pamukç.

= Asyneuma =

Genus of flowering plants

Asyneuma is a genus of flowering plants in the bellflower family, Campanulaceae. They are native to North Africa and Eurasia. Many are endemic to Turkey. Plants of the genus may be known commonly as harebells, but this name can also apply to the entire family. There are up to about 33 species.

Characters used to identify Asyneuma species include a generally wheel-shaped (rotate) corolla with the petals fused at the bases and spreading outward into very narrow lobes, lacking or rudimentary appendages on the calyx, a stigma with 2 to 4 lobes, and an oblong or roughly spherical fruit capsule that breaks open via pores on the sides. These characters are not always helpful in distinguishing Asyneuma from the closely related genus Campanula, because authors disagree on which character is more important: the extent to which the flower petals are joined versus the position of the pores on the fruit capsule. Molecular data has been required to determine the best genus in which to place certain species.

Species include:

1. Asyneuma amplexicaule (Willd.) Hand.-Mazz. - Turkey, Iran, Iraq, Caucasus
2. Asyneuma anthericoides (Janka) Bornm. - Balkans
3. Asyneuma argutum (Regel) Bornm. - Central Asia
4. Asyneuma babadaghense Yildiz & Kit Tan - Turkey
5. Asyneuma campanuloides (M.Bieb. ex Sims) Bornm. - Caucasus
6. Asyneuma canescens (Waldst. & Kit.) Griseb. & Schenk - Balkans, Ukraine
7. Asyneuma chinense D.Y.Hong - Guangxi, Guizhou, Hubei, Sichuan, Yunnan
8. Asyneuma compactum Damboldt - Turkey
9. Asyneuma davisianum Yildiz & Kit Tan - Turkey
10. Asyneuma ekimianum Yildiz & Kit Tan - Turkey
11. Asyneuma filipes (Nábelek) Damboldt - Turkey, Iraq
12. Asyneuma fulgens (Wall.) Briq. - Indian Subcontinent, Tibet, Myanmar
13. Asyneuma giganteum (Boiss.) Bornm. - Greek Islands
14. Asyneuma ilgazense Yildiz & Kit Tan - Turkey
15. Asyneuma isauricum Contandr., Quézel & Pamukç - Turkey
16. Asyneuma japonicum (Miq.) Briq. - Japan, Korea, Manchuria, Russian Far East
17. Asyneuma junceum Parolly - Turkey
18. Asyneuma limonifolium (L.) Janch. - Balkans, Italy, Turkey
19. Asyneuma linifolium (Boiss. & Heldr.) Bornm. - Turkey
20. Asyneuma lobelioides (Willd.) Hand.-Mazz. - Turkey, Caucasus
21. Asyneuma lycium (Boiss.) Bornm. - Turkey
22. Asyneuma macrodon (Boiss. & Hausskn.) Bornm. - Iran
23. Asyneuma michauxioides (Boiss.) Damboldt - Turkey
24. Asyneuma persicum (A.DC.) Bornm. - Turkey, Iraq, Iran
25. Asyneuma pulchellum (Fisch. & C.A.Mey.) Bornm.- Turkey, Iraq, Iran, Caucasus
26. Asyneuma pulvinatum P.H.Davis - Turkey
27. Asyneuma rigidum (Willd.) Grossh. - Algeria, Caucasus, Turkey, Iran, Iraq, Lebanon, Sinai, Syria
28. Asyneuma thomsonii (C.B.Clarke) Bornm. - western Himalayas
29. Asyneuma trichocalycinum (Boiss.) Bornm. - Turkey
30. Asyneuma trichostegium (Boiss.) Bornm. - Turkey
31. Asyneuma virgatum (Labill.) Bornm. - Greek Islands, Turkey, Iran, Caucasus, Syria
32. Asyneuma yildizianum Yıldırım & Özdöl - Turkey
