= Charles-Joseph Marie Pitard =

French botanist, explorer and politician (1873–1928)

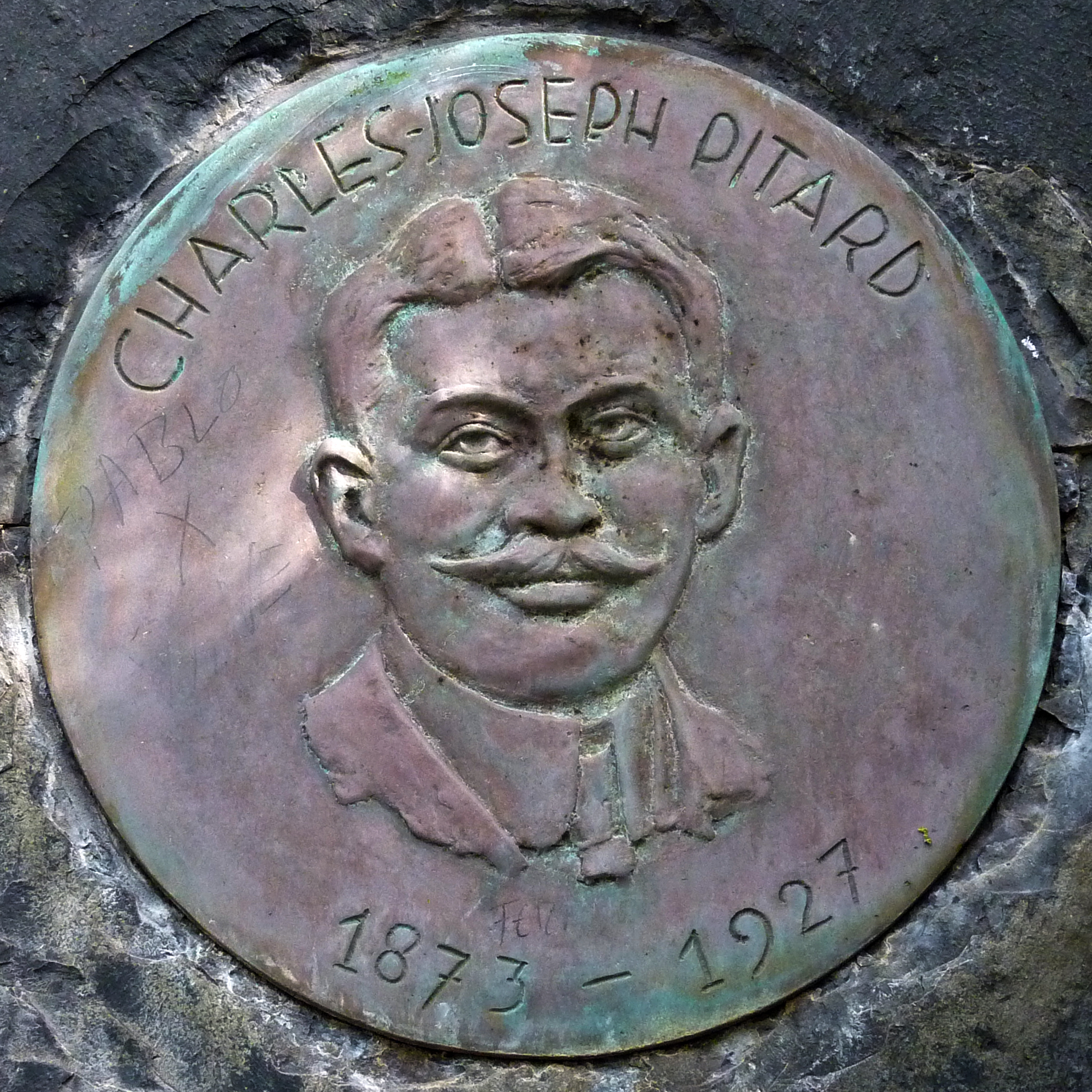
Plaque of Charles-Joseph Pitard in the "Jardín Botánico Canario Viera y Clavijo".

Charles-Joseph Marie Pitard, name sometimes given as Charles-Joseph Marie Pitard-Briau (30 October 1873 – 29 December 1927) was a French pharmacist and botanist.

In 1899 he obtained his doctorate in natural sciences at the University of Bordeaux, later serving as a professor at the school of medicine in Tours. He conducted botanical and exploratory investigations in the Canary Islands (1904–06), Tunisia (1907–10 & 1913) and Morocco (1911–13). Many of his plant collections were sent to herbaria in Geneva and Paris. Pitard edited three exsiccata-like specimen series issuing plant specimens from his voyages, namely Plantae Canarienses, Plantes du Maroc and Plantes de Tunisie.

He was the taxonomic authority of numerous botanical taxa. About 525 names have been published. Such as Aichryson mollii Pit., Iles Canaries 189.

The genus Pitardia (Batt. ex Pit.), now classed as a synonym of Nepeta L., was named in his honor. Then in 2003, Tirveng. published Pitardella, a genus of flowering plants from Indo-China, belonging to the family Rubiaceae.

Also named in his honour, are plants with the specific epithets of pitardii (about 27) and pitardiana (about 7). Such as Beaumontia pitardii Tsiang, and also Poa pitardiana H.Scholz.

== Published works ==
- Les Iles Canaries. Flore de l'Archipel (1908) – The Canary Islands, flora of the archipelago (with Louis Proust, 1878–1959).
- Contribution à l'étude de la Flore du Maroc (1931) – Contribution to the study of Moroccan flora.

Pitard also made significant contributions to the "Flore générale de L'Indo-Chine" (General flora of Indochina).
