= Elias Durand =

French-born American pharmacist and botanist (1794–1873)

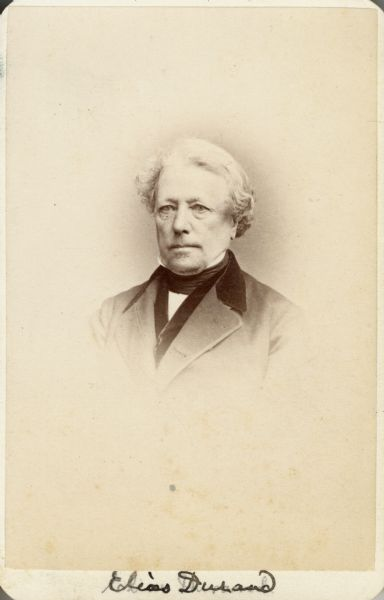
Elias Durand by Frederick Gutekunst

Elias Durand (January 25, 1794 – August 15, 1873), born Élie Magloire Durand, was an American pharmacist and botanist. He was born in France.

Durand was born in Mayenne, France, apprenticed as a chemist and pharmacist in Mayenne from 1808–1812, studied pharmacy in Paris, and on his graduation in 1813 joined the medical corps of Napoleon's army. He served for 14 months, and was present at the battles of Lützen, Bautzen, Hanau, Katzbach, and Leipzig. In 1814 he resigned his commission, and became an apothecary in Nantes where he studied botany intensively for two years. After Napoleon's downfall, he was suspected of Napoleonic tendencies, and sailed to New York City in 1816.

After intervals in Boston, Philadelphia, and Baltimore, he ultimately settled in Philadelphia, where he established a drugstore employed by many of the most eminent physicians of the day. In 1825 he became a member of Academy of Natural Sciences in Philadelphia, and in 1832 was elected a corresponding member of the Société de Pharmacie in Paris. In 1835 he was the first to begin bottling mineral waters in the United States, and was elected to the American Philosophical Society in 1854.

Durand actively devoted himself to botany, and became thoroughly familiar with the flora of North America, collecting an herbarium that included a remarkable 10,000 species of North American plants. This, the work of nearly forty years, he presented to the museum of the Jardin des Plantes in Paris in 1868. A separate gallery has been devoted to the collection in that institution, and it was called "Herbaria Durandi" after the donor. Dr. Durand was a contributor to scientific journals, and a member of scientific societies in the United States and Europe. He died in Philadelphia, Pennsylvania, on August 15, 1873, and was interred at Laurel Hill Cemetery.

== Selected works ==
- "Obituary of François André Michaux", in American Journal of Science, 2nd series, 1857, pp. 161–177.
- "Biographical Memoir of the late François André Michaux", in Transactions of the American Philosophical Society, 11, p. 17, 1860.
