= Ernest Cosson =

French botanist (1819–1889)

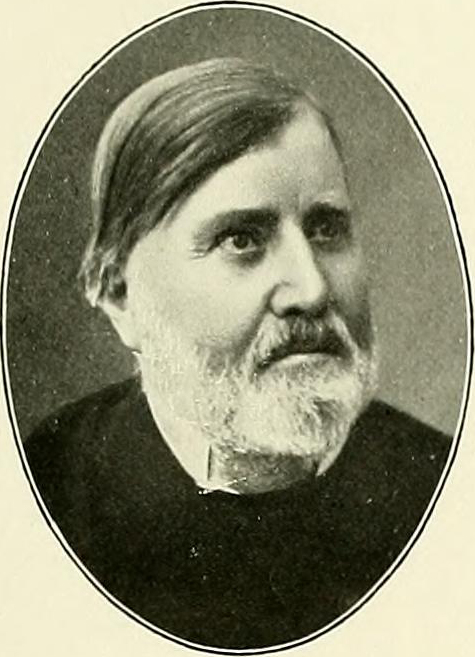
Ernest Saint-Charles Cosson

Ernest Saint-Charles Cosson (22 July 1819 – 31 December 1889) was a French botanist born in Paris.

Cosson is known for his botanical research in North Africa, and during his career he participated in eight trips to Algeria. In several of these he was accompanied by Henri-René Le Tourneux de la Perraudière (1831–1861), whom he honoured in the naming of several species and genera (e.g., Perralderia, Galium perralderii). In 1863 he was elected president of the Société botanique de France, and from 1873 to 1889, he was a member of the Académie des sciences.

In 1882 Jules Ferry, as Minister of Public Instruction, decided to create a mission to explore the Regency of Tunisia. The expedition was headed by Cosson and included the botanist Napoléon Doumet-Adanson and other naturalists. In 1884 a geological section under Georges Rolland was added to the Tunisian Scientific Exploration Mission. Rolland was assisted by Philippe Thomas from 1885 and by Georges Le Mesle in 1887.

With Jacques Nicolas Ernest Germain de Saint-Pierre (1815–1882), Cosson published the influential Atlas de la Flore des Environs de Paris.

Botanical specimens collected by Cosson are held in many herbaria around the world, including the National Museum of Natural History, France, Harvard University Herbaria, the herbarium at the Royal Botanic Gardens, Kew, the National Herbarium of Victoria at the Royal Botanic Gardens Victoria, Copenhagen University Botanical Museum, the New York Botanical Garden, and the Komarov Botanical Institute, among others.

== Selected writings ==
- Atlas de la flore des environs de Paris ou illustrations de toutes les espèces des genres difficiles et de la plupart des plantes litigieuses de cette région. Fortin, Masson. 1845.
- Introduction à la Flore d'Algérie, etc. (with Michel Charles Durieu de Maisonneuve), 1854.
- Rapport sur un Voyage botanique en Algérie, de Philippeville à Biskra et dans les Monts Aurès, Ann. Sc. Nat. Sér. 4 (1856).
- Instructions sur les observations et les collections botaniques à faire dans les voyages, 1872
- Note sur le projet de création en Algérie d'une mer dite intérieure, 1880
- Forets, bois et broussailles des principales localités du Nord de la Tunisie explores, 1883.
- Compendium florae Atlanticae [...] Volume I. Première partie.- Historique et Géographie..., 1881
- Compendium florae Atlanticae [...] Volume II. Supplément à la partie historique et flore des états barbaresques..., 1887
- Illustrationes florae Atlanticae [...] Volumen I..., 1882–1890
- Illustrationes florae Atlanticae [...] Volumen II..., 1892–1897
- Instructions sur les observations et les collections botaniques à faire dans les voyages..., 1872
- Note sur la flore del la Kroumirie centrale..., 1885
- Notes sur quelques plantes critiques, rares ou nouvelles..., 1849–1852
- Cosson, Ernest Saint-Charles & Germain de Saint-Pierre, Jacques-Nicolas-Ernest
  - Atlas de la flore des environs de Paris [...] Deuxième édition..., 1882
  - Flore descriptive et analytique des environs de Paris..., 1845
  - Flore [descriptive et analytique] des environs de Paris [...] Deuxième édition..., 1861
  - Observations sur quelques plantes critiques des environs de Paris..., 1840
  - Supplément au Catalogue raisonné des plantes vasculaires des environs Paris..., 1843
  - Synopsis analytique de la flore des environs de Paris [...] Deuxième édition..., 1859
  - Synopsis analytique de la flore des environs de Paris [...] Troisième édition..., 1876
- Cosson, Ernest Saint-Charles; Germain de Saint-Pierre, Jacques-Nicolas-Ernest & Weddell, Hugh Algernon
  - Introduction à une flore analytique et descriptive des environs de Paris..., 1842

== Sources ==
- Burollet, Pierre F. (21 June 1995), "L'exploration de la Tunisie avant la première guerre mondiale", Travaux du Comitée français d'Histoire de la Géologie (in French), 9 (3), Comité Français d'Histoire de la Géologie (COFRHIGEO) (séance du 21 juin 1995)
- Ducloux (1913), "Philippe THOMAS (1843-1910)", Bulletin de la Société centrale de médecine vétérinaire, Paris: Société de médecine vétérinaire (France) / Asselin
- Tawadros, Edward (2011-11-02), Geology of North Africa, CRC Press, ISBN 978-0-415-87420-5
