= Ahmad =

Arabic male name

- Pronunciation: English: /ˈɑːmæd, ˈɑːmɛd/ AH-mad, AH-med; Standard Arabic: [ˈ(ʔ)aħmad]; Egyptian Arabic: [ˈæħmæd]; Turkish: [ahˈmet]; Persian: [ˈ(ʔ)æhmæd]; Urdu: [ˈɛɦməd]; Tatar: [æχˈmæt]
- Gender: Male
- Language: Arabic

Origin
- Meaning: "Highly Praised"

Other names
- Alternative spelling: Ahmed
- Variant forms: Ahmed: Achmad; Achmat; Achmed; Akhmat; Akhmed; Achmet; Ahmat; Ahmet; Ahmadu; Amadou; Ahmot; Amadu

Ahmad (Arabic: أحمد, romanized: ʾAḥmad) is an Arabic male given name common in most parts of the Muslim world, since it is one of the well-known names of prophet Muhammad. Other English spellings of the name include Ahmed, Ahmmad. It is also used as a surname.

== Lexicology ==
The word derives from the root ح م د (ḥ-m-d), from the Arabic أَحْمَدَ (ʾaḥmad), from the verb حَمِدَ (ḥameda, "to thank or to praise"), non-past participle يَحْمَدُ (yaḥmadu).

As an Arabic name, it has its origins in a Quranic prophecy attributed to Isa (Jesus) in the Quran 61:6 speaking about another Abrahamic prophet with an Arab name of Ahmmad (The Praised One) following him, which most Islamic scholars agree is about Muhammad. It also shares the same Arabic roots as Mahmud, Muhammad, Hamed, and Hamad. In its transliteration, the name has one of the highest number of spelling variations in the world.

Some Islamic traditions view the name Ahmad as another given name of Muhammad at birth by his mother, considered by Muslims to be the more esoteric name of Muhammad and central to understanding his nature. Over the centuries, some Islamic scholars have suggested the name's parallel is in the word 'Paraclete' from the Biblical text, although this view is not universal considering translations, meanings and etymology.

Traditional Islamic sources, such as Sahih al-Bukhari, Sahih Muslim, and others contain hadith in which Muhammad personally refers to himself as Ahmad.

A hadith attributed to Jubayr ibn Mut'im reports:

Allah's Messenger (ﷺ) said, "I have five names: I am Muhammad and Ahmad; I am Al-Mahi through whom Allah will eliminate infidelity; I am Al-Hashir who will be the first to be resurrected, the people being resurrected there after; and I am also Al-`Aqib (i.e. There will be no prophet after me).

Arabic: قَالَ رَسُولُ اللَّهِ صلى الله عليه وسلم " لِي خَمْسَةُ أَسْمَاءٍ أَنَا مُحَمَّدٌ، وَأَحْمَدُ، وَأَنَا الْمَاحِي الَّذِي يَمْحُو اللَّهُ بِي الْكُفْرَ، وَأَنَا الْحَاشِرُ الَّذِي يُحْشَرُ النَّاسُ عَلَى قَدَمِي، وَأَنَا الْعَاقِبُ ".

Sunnis tend to view this as Sahih and have included it in Sahih al-Bukhari 3532.

Christian orientalists such as W. Montgomery Watt, however, claim that the use of Ahmad as a proper name for "Muhammad" did not exist until well into the second Islamic century, previously being used only in an adjectival sense. Watt concludes that the development of the term being used as a name in reference to Muhammad came later in the context of Christian-Muslim polemics, particularly with Muslim attempts to equate Muhammad with the Biblical 'Paraclete', owing to a prophecy attributed to Jesus in the Quranic verse 61:6.

== Interpretations and meanings of Ahmad ==
=== Development ===
Regarding Ibn Ishaq's biography of Muhammad, the Sirat Rasul Allah, Islamic scholar Alfred Guillaume wrote:

"Coming back to the term "Ahmad," Muslims have suggested that Ahmad is the translation of periklutos, celebrated or the Praised One, which is a corruption of parakletos, the Paraclete of John XIV, XV and XVI."

=== Ahmad passage ===
Here are two translations of the passage in question in Surat 61 verse 6:

"And [mention] when Jesus, the son of Mary, said, "O children of Israel, indeed I am the messenger of Allah to you confirming what came before me of the Torah and bringing good tidings of a messenger to come after me, whose name is Ahmad." But when he came to them with clear evidences, they said, "This is obvious magic." - Sahih International

"And when Jesus son of Mary said: O Children of Israel! Lo! I am the messenger of Allah unto you, confirming that which was (revealed) before me in the Torah, and bringing good tidings of a messenger who cometh after me, whose name is the Praised One. Yet when he hath come unto them with clear proofs, they say: This is mere magic." - Pickthall

The verse in the Quran attributes a name or designation, describing or identifying who would follow Jesus. In his Farewell Discourse to his disciples, Jesus promised that he would "send the Holy Spirit" to them after his departure, in John 15:26 stating: "whom I will send unto you from the Father, [even] the Spirit of truth... shall bear witness of me." John 14:17 states "[even] the Spirit of truth: whom the world cannot receive; for it beholdeth him not, neither knoweth him: ye know him; for he abideth with you, and shall be in you."

Regarding verse 61:6 in the Quran:

"It is not clear to whom the pronoun ‘he’ refers in the concluding sentence. Bell says ‘probably Jesus,’ but ‘sometimes taken to refer to the promised messenger who is identified with Muhammad.’ Secondly, and in consequence the intervening words, ‘bearing the name Ahmad,’ are grammatically superfluous. They do not help to make the pronominal reference any clearer as to who it was whose Evidences were greeted as magic. Without the clause about Ahmad the context would appear to demand that it was Jesus rather than the next ‘messenger’ who was intended. Whether we maintain the usual reading or adopt that of ‘magician’ (as read by Ibn Masud and others), the charge of sorcery generally would seem as true to the Jewish calumnies in the Fourth Gospel as to the somewhat similar charges brought against Muhammad. In any case it was the Banu Isra'il to whom both Jesus and the ‘messenger’ came, and who regarded the mission as ‘sorcery.’ Once more, if we omit the phrase, ‘bearing the name Ahmad,’ and regard Muhammad as still drawing lessons from previous history, the dubious passage might refer to what happened at Pentecost, and other incidents recorded in the earlier chapters of the Acts. With the absence of any claim on this passage either by Ibn Ishaq or Ibn Hisham, may we go further and suggest that the two Arabic words rendered by Dr. Bell, ‘bearing the name Ahmad,’ are an interpolation to be dated after the death of Muhammad." (emphasis in original)

Contrary to the above claim that Ibn Ishaq and Ibn Hisham did not mention Ahmad and the respective passage, there is Ibn Ishaq's work with the title Kitab al-Maghazi and Ibn Hisham who mention and connect the words Mohammad & Ahmad with the Paraclete. Additionally it has been documented that there was an attempt to connect the respective quranic verse with the Paraclete even earlier than Ibn Ishaq. Moreover, a later interpolation of this passage to the Quran, just to serve as an ex eventu prove for the early Muslim scholars, has also been refuted in modern Islamic Studies. This is supported by the fact that the earliest as well as the later manuscripts of the Quran contain the exact passage and wording in Surah 61.

=== Scholarship regarding the Greek translation ===
"Early translators knew nothing about the surmised reading of periklutos for parakletos, and its possible rendering as Ahmad… Periklutos does not come into the picture as far as Ibn Ishaq and Ibn Hisham are concerned. The deception is not theirs. The opportunity to introduce Ahmad was not accepted – though it is highly improbable that they were aware of it being a possible rendering of Periklutos. It would have clinched the argument to have followed the Johannine references with a Quranic quotation."

"Furthermore the Peshitta, Old Syriac, and Philoxenian versions all write the name of John in the form Yuhanan, not in the Greek form Yuhannis… Accordingly to find a text of the Gospels from which Ibn Ishaq could have drawn his quotation we must look for a version which differs from all others in displaying these characteristics. Such a text is the Palestinian Syriac Lectionary of the Gospels which will conclusively prove that the Arabic writer had a Syriac text before him which he, or his informant, skillfully manipulated to provide the reading we have in the Sira."

"Muslim children are never called Ahmad before the year 123AH. But there are many instances prior to this date of boys called 'Muhammad.' Very rarely is the name 'Ahmad' met with in pre-Islamic time of ignorance (Jahiliya), though the name Muhammad was in common use. Later traditions that the prophet's name was Ahmad show that this had not always been obvious, though commentators assume it after about 22 (AH)."

"It has been concluded that the word Ahmad in Quran as-Saff 61:6 is to be taken not as a proper name but as an adjective… and that it was understood as a proper name only after Muhammad had been identified with the Paraclete."

"Note that by the middle of the 2nd century AH, Muslims already identified Muhammad with the Greek word "Paracletos" (Counsellor / Advocate) or the Aramaic translation "Menahhemana."

== Transliterations ==
Ahmad is the most common transliteration. It is used commonly all over the Muslim world, although primarily in the Middle East. More recently, this transliteration has become increasingly popular in the United States due to use by members of the African American community.

Ahmed is the most common variant transliteration, used especially in the context of the Ottoman Empire. This transliteration is also used throughout the Muslim world.

Ahmet is the modern Turkish transliteration. Modern Turkish uses a Latin-based alphabet, and most Arabic-derived names have standardized Turkish spellings.

The less common transliterations of Ahmad, Akhmad are used by Muslims outside the Middle East proper, such as in Indonesia and Russia.

For Bashkirs and Tatars, the name is Ahmat/Akhmat (Әхмәт, Äxmät / Əxmət).

Achmat is the fairly standard transliteration used by South Africa's Muslim community, and its pronunciation shows evidence of the influence of Afrikaans: the <ch> which represents ح [ħ] is pronounced as an Afrikaans <g> [x] (i.e. closer to the Arabic خ); and the د [d] is realised as a [t] (closer to the Arabic ت) which follows Afrikaans Final-obstruent devoicing principles.

== People with the given name ==
=== Ahmad ===
- Ahmad ibn Hanbal (780–855), Arab Muslim jurist, theologian, ascetic, hadith traditionist, and founder of the Hanbali school of Islamic jurisprudence
- Ahmad ibn Isma'il ibn Ali al-Hashimi, Abbasid provincial governor who was active in the late eighth century
- Ahmad ibn al-Mu'tasim, Abbasid prince and son of Abbasid caliph Al-Mu'tasim. He was also patron of Science, philosophy and Art.
- Ahmad ibn Muhammad (died 866), better known as Al-Musta'in, twelfth Abbasid caliph (r. 862–866)
- Ahmad Shah Durrani, founder of the Afghan Durrani Empire
- Ahmad Khan Yousafzai, founder of Pakhtunkhwa
- Ahmad Shah Bahadur, Mughal Emperor
- Sheikh Ahmad, Siamese official of Persian ancestry
- Ahmad (rapper), West Coast hip hop performer
- Ahmad Abbas, Saudi Arabian footballer
- Ahmad Abdalla, Egyptian film director
- Ahmed Adel (disambiguation), multiple people
- Ahmad Ahmadi, Iranian physician
- Ahmed Ajaj, Palestinian convicted of participating in the 1993 World Trade Center bombing
- Ahmad Ismail Ali (1917–1974), Egyptian army officer
- Ahmad Alaq, Khan of eastern Moghulistan
- Ahmad Amin, Egyptian historian and writer
- Ahmad Alyaseer, Jordanian director and producer
- Ahmad A'zam, Uzbek writer
- Ahmed Ibrahim Artan, Somali diplomat, author and politician
- Ahmad ibn Ibrahim al-Ghazi, The Somali Imam of Adal Sultanate who conquered Abyssinia
- Ahmad Bahar, Iranian politician
- Ahmad Balshe, Palestinian-Canadian rapper, singer, songwriter, and record producer known professionally as Belly
- Ahmad Belal, Egyptian former football player
- Ahmad bey Javanshir, Azerbaijani historian
- Ahmad Black, American football safety for the Florida Gators
- Ahmad Bradshaw, American former football running back for the Indianapolis Colts
- Ahmad Brooks, American football linebacker for the San Francisco 49ers
- Ahmad Bunnag of Siam
- Ahmad Bustomi, Indonesian footballer
- Ahmad Carroll, American football free agent
- Ahmad Dahlan, Indonesian Islamic revivalist
- Ahmad Dhani, Indonesian musician
- Ahmad Dukhqan, Jordanian politician
- Ahmad Esfandiari (1922–2012) Iranian painter
- Ahmad Fanakati, financial officer of Kublai Khan's Yuan Dynasty
- Ahmad Fuadi, Indonesian writer
- Ahmad "Sauce" Gardner (born 2000), American football player
- Ahmad Gooden (born 1995), American football player
- Ahmad Harb (1951–2025), Palestinian novelist
- Ahmad Alwaki, Syrian Man
- Ahmad Hardi, Kurdish poet
- Ahmad Hardy, American football player
- Ahmad Hawkins, American football defensive back for the Alabama Vipers
- Ahmad Hijazi (born 1994), Lebanese footballer
- Ahmad ibn Hanbal, Founder of the Hanbalite school of Muslim jurisprudence
- Ahmad ibn Fadlan, Abbasid ambassador to the Volga Bulgars
- Ahmad ibn Tulun, founder of the Tulunid dynasty
- Ahmad-Jabir Ahmadov, "Honored teacher" of Azerbaijan
- Ahmad Jalloul (born 1992), Lebanese footballer
- Ahmad Jamal, American jazz pianist
- Ahmad Javad (1892–1937), Azerbaijani poet
- Ahmad Sayyed Javadi, Iranian lawyer and politician
- Ahmad Kaabour (1955–2026), Lebanese singer, songwriter, composer, and actor
- Ahmad Karami (1944–2020), Lebanese politician
- Ahmad Kasravi, Iranian linguists and historian
- Ahmad Khatib al-Minangkabawi (1860–1915), Minangkabau Islamic teacher
- Ahmed Mohamed Kismayo (1964–2017), Somali journalist
- Ahmad Maher (disambiguation), various people
- Ahmad Mohammad Hasher Al Maktoum
- Ahmad Al Mansur (1549–1603), Sultan of Morocco
- Ahmad Miller (born 1978), American football player
- Ahmad Mirfendereski (1918–2004), Iranian diplomat
- Ahmad Merritt, American football free agent
- Ahmad Moten Sr. (born 2004), American football player
- Ahmad Muin Yaacob, Malaysian convicted murderer
- Ahmad Murad (1943–2004), Bruneian diplomat
- Ahmad Nafisi (1919–2004), Iranian bureaucrat and mayor of Tehran (1961–1963)
- Ahmad Nateghi (born 1958) Iranian photojournalist, photographer
- Ahmad Nivins, American basketball player
- Ahmad Obeidat (1938–2026), Jordanian politician
- Ahmad Rashad, American sportscaster and former football player
- Ahmad ibn Rustah, Persian chronicler born in Isfahan, Persia
- Ahmad Sa'adat, Secretary-General of the Popular Front for the Liberation of Palestine
- Ahmad Al Abdullah Al Sabah (born 1952), Kuwaiti royal and politician
- Ahmad Said (politician), Malaysian politician
- Ahmad Sakr (born 1970), Lebanese footballer
- Ahmad Sanjar (1086–1157), ruler of the Seljuk Turks
- Ahmad Ali Sepehr, Iranian historian and politician
- Ahmad Shah Massoud, Afghan military leader Deputy Justice on the Supreme Court of Afghanistan
- Ahmad Shah Qajar, Last Shah of the Qajar dynastyAhmad Shah Massoud, Afghan military leader Deputy Justice on the Supreme Court of Afghanistan
- Ahmad Shamlou, Persian poet and writer
- Ahmad Shukeiri, first Chairman of the Palestine Liberation Organization
- Ahmad Sohrab, Persian author
- Ahmad Syafi'i Maarif, Indonesian intellectual
- Ahmad Tajuddin, 27th Sultan of Brunei
- Ahmad Taktouk (born 1984), Lebanese footballer
- Ahmad Tekuder (died 1284), leader of the Mongol Ilkhanate
- Ahmad Tejan Kabbah, President of Sierra Leone
- Ahmad bin Ali Al Thani, Emir of the State of Qatar
- Ahmad Thomas (born 1994), American football player
- Ahmad Treaudo, American football cornerback for the California Redwoods
- Ahmad Yani, Indonesian Army general
- Ahmad Zarruq, Shadhili Sufi Sheikh
- Ahmad Yaakob, Malaysian politician; Menteri Besar of Kelantan
- Ahmad Najib Aris, Malaysian convicted rapist and killer who was hanged for the rape and murder of Canny Ong
- Ahmad Lawan, President of the Senate of Nigeria

=== Ahmed ===
- Ahmed I, sultan of the Ottoman Empire
- Ahmed II, sultan of the Ottoman Empire
- Ahmed III, sultan of the Ottoman Empire
- Ahmed Abdel Wahab Pasha (1889–1938), Egyptian economist
- Ahmed Abukhater, urban and regional planner and Palestinian-American powerlifter
- Ahmed Ahmed, Egyptian American actor and comedian
- Ahmed Al-Kaf, Omani football referee
- Ahmed Arif (1927–1991), Turkish poet
- Ahmed Ali Awan (born 1980), convicted of the racially motivated murder of Ross Parker
- Ahmed Fouad Alkhatib, Palestinian American activist
- Ahmed Khan bin Küchük, a khan of the Great Horde between 1465 and 1481
- Ahmed Saidu Baba (born 1973), Nigerian politician, member of the Kwara State House of Assembly
- Ahmed Baduri, Eritrean diplomat
- Ahmed Hassan al-Bakr, former President of Iraq
- Ahmed Ben Bella, the first President of Algeria
- Ahmed Chalabi, leader of the Iraqi National Congress
- Ahmed El Din (disambiguation), multiple people
- Ahmed Galal (politician) (born 1948), Egyptian economist
- Ahmed al-Ghamdi (1979–2001), Saudi hijacker of United Airlines Flight 175
- Ahmed M. Hassan, Somali politician
- Ahmed al-Haznawi (1980–2001), Saudi hijacker of United Airlines Flight 93
- Ahmed Hulusi, Turkish writer and Sufi
- Ahmed Hussein (disambiguation), multiple people
- Ahmed Hussen, Somali-Canadian lawyer
- Ahmed Imamovic, Bosnian film director
- Ahmed Abu Ismail, Egyptian economist and politician
- Ahmed Jaziri (born 1997), Tunisian steeplechaser
- Ahmed Mohamed Kathrada (1929–2017), South African politician, political prisoner and anti-apartheid activist.
- Ahmed Khadr, Egyptian-Canadian senior associate and financier of al-Qaeda
- Ahmed Khan (disambiguation), multiple people
- Ahmed Raza Khan Barelvi, Mujaddid of 14th century of Islam
- Ahmed Köprülü, Ottoman Grand Vizier of the Köprülü family
- Ahmed Laghrissi (1937–2022), Moroccan footballer
- Ahmed bin Rashid Al Maktoum, United Arab Emirati politician
- Ahmed bin Saeed Al Maktoum, United Arab Emirati businessman
- Ahmed Marei, Egyptian basketball coach and former player
- Ahmed Mestiri (1925–2021), Tunisian lawyer and politician
- Ahmed Mohiuddin, Pakistani biologist
- Ahmed Musa, Nigerian footballer
- Ahmed Naamani (born 1979), Lebanese footballer
- Ahmed Nadeem, cricketer
- Ahmed bin Saif Al Nahyan, founder and chairman of Etihad Airways
- Ahmed bin Zayed Al Nahyan, Emirati businessman
- Ahmed al-Nami (1977–2001), Saudi hijacker of United Airlines Flight 93
- Ahmed Nazif (born 1952), Egyptian politician
- Ahmed Nizam, Indian cricketer
- Ahmed Elmi Osman, Somali politician
- Ahmed Patel, Indian politician
- Ahmed Plummer, former NFL player
- Ahmed Rushdi, Pakistani singer
- Ahmed Rushdi, Egyptian politician
- Ahmed Salim, Bangladeshi painter and murderer hanged in Singapore in 2024
- Ahmed bin Salman Al Saud, member of the royal family of Saudi Arabia
- Ahmed Santos, Mexican newspaper columnist
- Ahmed Şerafettin, Turkish football manager
- Ahmed al-Sharaa (born 1982), Syrian revolutionary, military commander, politician and current President of Syria
- Ahmed Sheikh, Palestinian journalist
- Ahmed Talbi, Moroccan footballer
- Ahmed bin Abdullah Al Thunayan (1889–1923), Turkish born Saudi royal
- Ahmed Sékou Touré, African political leader and president of the Republic of Guinea
- Ahmed Yassin, former leader of Palestinian Hamas
- Ahmed Yesevi, leader of Sufi mysticism
- Ahmed H. Zewail, the winner of the 1999 Nobel Prize in Chemistry for his work on femtochemistry
- Ahmed Bola Tinubu, President of Nigeria since 2023.
- Sheikh Ahmed (died 1529), the last Khan of the Great Horde

=== Ahmet ===
- Ahmet Akdilek (born 1988), Turkish cyclist
- Ahmet Alkan, Turkish economist
- Ahmet Almaz, Turkish journalist
- Ahmet Bilek (1932–1971), Turkish Olympic champion
- Ahmet Bozer (born 1960), Turkish business executive
- Ahmet Cevdet, multiple people
- Ahmet Cömert (1926–1990), Turkish amateur boxer, coach, referee, boxing judge and sports official
- Ahmet Davutoğlu (born 1959), Turkish politician and political scientist
- Ahmet Dursun (born 1978), Turkish footballer
- Ahmet Enünlü (born 1948), Turkish bodybuilder
- Ahmet Burak Erdoğan (born 1979), son of Turkish President Recep Tayyip Erdoğan
- Ahmet Ertegun (1923–2006), Turkish American founder and president of Atlantic Records
- Ahmet Gülhan (born 1978), Turkish wrestler
- Ahmet Haşim (1884–1933), Turkish writer
- Ahmet Hromadžić (1923–2003), Bosnian writer
- Ahmet İsvan (1923–2017), Turkish politician
- Ahmet Kaya (1957–2000), Turkish–Kurdish folk singer
- Ahmet Mete Işıkara (1941–2013), Turkish seismologist
- Ahmet İzzet Pasha (1864–1937), Ottoman general
- Ahmet Kaplan (born 2002), Turkish wheelchair tennis player
- Ahmet Kireççi (1914–1979), Turkish sports wrestler
- Ahmet Koç, Turkish musician
- Ahmet Köksal, (1920–1997), Turkish poet and writer
- Ahmet Kuru (born 1982), Turkish footballer
- Ahmet Li (born 1991), Chinese-Turkish table tennis player
- Ahmet Öcal (born 1979), Belgian footballer
- Ahmet Örken (born 1993), Turkish cyclist
- Ahmet Suat Özyazıcı (1936–2023), Turkish footballer
- Ahmet Peker (born 1989), Turkish wrestler
- Ahmet Rasim (1864–1932), Turkish writer and politician
- Ahmet Sağlam (born 1987), Turkish footballer
- Ahmet Necdet Sezer (born 1941), 10th President of the Republic of Turkey
- Ahmet Burak Solakel (born 1982), Turkish footballer
- Ahmet Hamdi Tanpınar (1901–1962), Turkish writer
- Ahmet Tren (born 1950), Turkish wrestler
- Ahmet Fuat Tugay, known as Hulusi Fuat Tugay (1890–1967), Turkish physician and diplomat
- Ahmet Türk (born 1942), Turkish politician
- Ahmet Fikri Tüzer (1878–1942), Turkish politician
- Ahmet Uzel (1930–1998), Turkish composer
- Ahmet Uzun, Turkish Cypriot politician
- Ahmet Ümit (born 1960), Turkish author
- Ahmet Ünal (born 2002), Turkish para judoka
- Ahmet Üzümcü (born 1951), Turkish diplomat
- Ahmet Vardar (1937–2010), Turkish journalist
- Ahmet Emin Yalman (1888–1972), Turkish journalist
- Ahmet Yıldırım (born 1974), Turkish footballer
- Ahmet Yıldız (born 1979), Turkish scientist
- Ahmet Zappa (born 1974), American musician, actor and novelist
- Ahmet Zogu, King of Albania (1928–1939)

=== Other spellings ===
- Achmad Jufriyanto, Indonesian footballer
- Achmad Nawir, Dutch East Indies footballer
- Achmad Saba'a, Arab-Israeli footballer
- Achmad Soebardjo, Indonesian diplomat
- Achmat Dangor (1948–2020), South African writer, poet, and development professional
- Achmat Hassiem (born 1982), South African Paralympic swimmer
- Achmed Abdullah, Russian writer
- Achmed Akkabi, Moroccan-Dutch presenter and actor
- Achmet (oneiromancer), Occultist
- Ahmat Acyl, Chadian Arab insurgent leader
- Ahmat Brahim, Chadian footballer
- Ahmat Jidoud, Nigerien economist and former politician
- Ahmat Taboye, Chadian writer
- Akhmed Avtorkhanov, Chechen leader
- Akhmad Kadyrov, First President of the Chechen Republic
- Akhmed Zakayev, Prime Minister of the Chechen Republic
- Ahmaud Arbery, African American murder victim

== People with the surname ==
=== Ahmad ===
- Alimuddin Ahmad (1884–1920), Bengali activist and revolutionary
- Ekramuddin Ahmad (1872–1940), Bengali litterateur
- Evin Ahmad (born 1990), Swedish actress of Kurdish descent
- Fauzia Ahmad, professor of electrical engineering
- Feroz Ahmad (1938–2025), Indian-born Turkish-American academic, historian and political scientist
- Ismet Ahmad (1945–2023), Indonesian academic, bureaucrat and lecturer
- Khondaker Mostaq Ahmad (1918–1996), Bangladeshi politician
- Masud Ahmad (1943–2018), Pakistani theoretical physicist
- Mirza Ghulam Ahmad (1835–1908), the founder of the Ahmadiyya Movement in Islam
- Najm Hamad Al Ahmad (born 1969), Syrian politician
- Nesaruddin Ahmad (1873–1952), Bengali Islamic scholar and Pir of Sarsina
- Salahuddin Ahmad (1947/1948–2025), Bangladeshi jurist and Attorney General 2008–2009
- Serajuddin Ahmad, Bengali politician
- Sharnaaz Ahmad, a male actor from Malaysia
- Taha Othman Ahmad, known as Odetari (born 2000), American singer, record producer, and rappAhmad padilla
- (1944–1991), Palestinian politician
- Abdel Rahim Ahmed, Egyptian film director and author
- Akeela Ahmed, British activist
- Alfaz Ahmed (born 1973), Bangladeshi football player and coach
- Alfazuddin Ahmed, Bengali politician
- Anis Ahmed (disambiguation), multiple people
- Aymeric Ahmed (born 2003), Comorian footballer
- Fakhruddin Ali Ahmed (1905–1977), 5th President of India
- Ferdous Ahmed, Bangladeshi actor
- Hafsa Ahmed, lecturer and community worker in New Zealand
- Hajiya Haidzatu Ahmed, Queen of Kumbwada
- Luai Ahmed (born 1993), Yemen-born Swedish journalist, columnist, and influencer
- Nassim Ahmed (born 2000), Comorian footballer
- Nick Ahmed (born 1990), American baseball player
- Novera Ahmed (1939–2015), Bangladeshi sculptor
- Qanta Ahmed, British-American physician, author, women's rights activist, journalist, and public commentator
- Riz Ahmed (born 1982), British actor and rapper
- Rafiq Uddin Ahmed (1926–1952), demonstrator killed during Bengali Language Movement
- Rafiuddin Ahmed, Indian Bengali dentist
- Sufiya Ahmed, British-Indian children's author
- Mohammed Ahmed, Ethiopian businessman

=== Other variants ===
- Claire Achmad, Chief Children's Commissioner in New Zealand
- Taghmeda Achmat, also known as Midi Achmat, South African lesbian activist
- Zackie Achmat (born 1962), South African activist and film director
- Rosli Ahmat (1970–2002), Singaporean armed robber and murderer

=== Fictional characters ===
- Aĥmad, protaonist in Malatily Bathhouse, a 1973 Egyptian film

== See also ==
- The dictionary definition of Ahmad at Wiktionary
