= Ocal =

Ocal or OCAL may refer to:

- Öcal, Turkish surname
- Öçal, Turkish surname
- Open Clip Art Library
- Organization of Communist Action in Lebanon
