= Ahmed Hussein =

Ahmed Hussein or variations may refer to:

- Ahmed Hussein (swimmer), Egyptian swimmer
- Ahmed Hussein (Egyptian politician) (1911–1982)
- Ahmed Hussen (born 1976), Canadian politician
- Ahmed Hussain (minister) (1863–1950), Indian politician and businessman
- Ahmed Hussain (Assam politician)
- Ahmed Hussain (singer), Indian ghazal singer
- Ahmed Houssein, Djiboutian football manager
- Ahmed Hussein Adan (born 1977), Iraqi football player
- Ahmed Hussain A. Kazi (1920–2007), Pakistani civil servant
- Ahmed Hussain Macan Markar (1911–15 July 1985), Sri Lankan politician
- Ahmed Hussain Shah, Pakistani politician
- Ahmed Hussein-Suale (1987–2019), Ghanaian journalist
- Ahmad Hossain, Bangladeshi politician
- Ahmed Hossain, Indian politician
- Ahmad Hussain, British singer
- Achmad Husein, Indonesian politician
- Ahmed Husain, Baharani handball player
- Ahmad Husein, Indonesian independence fighter

== See also ==
- Ahmad Hoseyn, village in Iran
