= A. Ahmed =

A. Ahmed may refer to:

== A. Ahmed ==
- Ahmed Ghailani (born 1974), conspirator of the al-Qaeda terrorist organization

== Ahmed A. ==
- Ahmed Ahmed (born 1970), Egyptian-born American actor
- Ahmed Asmat Abdel-Meguid (1923–2013), Egyptian diplomat
- Ahmed Al-Kudmani (born 1979), Saudi Arabian swimmer
- Ahmed Adnan Saygun (1907–1991), Turkish composer
- Ahmed Abukhater, architect
- Ahmed Al-Arbeed Kuwaiti fencer
- Ahmed Abdi Godane (1977–2014), Emir (leader) of Al-Shabaab
- Ahmed Al-Fahad Al-Ahmed Al-Sabah (born 1963), Kuwaiti politician
- Ahmed Awad Ibn Auf (born c. 1956), Sudanese general and politician
