= Ahmed El Din =

Ahmed El Din or Ahmed Eldin (Arabic: أحمد الدين) may refer to:

- Ahmed Alaa Eldin (born 1994), Egyptian footballer
- Ahmed Alaaeldin (born 1993), Qatari footballer
- Ahmed El-Din Rafik Al-Hariri (born 1984), Lebanese-Saudi politician
- Ahmed Emad Eldin (born 1996), Egyptian digital artist
- Ahmed Gamal El Din (born 1952), former Minister of Interior of Egypt
- Ahmed Gamal El-Din Moussa (born 1951), former Minister of Education and Higher Education of Egypt
- Ahmed Mohamed Sharaf El-Din (born 1938), Sudanese former footballer
- Ahmed Shihab-Eldin (born 1984), American-Kuwaiti journalist

== See also ==
- Ad-Din
- Ahmad
