= One Sky (novel) =

2007 novel by Liana Badr

- Author: Liana Badr
- Original title: سماء واحدة
- Language: Arabic
- Subject: Palestinian identity, Second Intifada, Israeli occupation of the West Bank
- Genre: Literary Fiction
- Publisher: Dar Al-Saqi
- Publication date: 1 January 2007
- Publication place: Lebanon
- Media type: Print
- Pages: 181
- ISBN: 978-1855166615

One Sky is a novel by the Palestinian novelist, short story writer and film producer Liana Badr. It was published in 2007 by Dar Al-Saqi Publishing House. The novel portrays themes of identity, belonging, and the obstacles of living across different cultures. The storyline showcases the main character's experiences and how they influence her perspective of identity and belonging.

The novel features the protagonist encountering consequences stemming from her past and establishing her identity. She attempts to reconcile her past with her present, seeking a balance between her cultural heritage and her new life, as she travels across multiple destinations and cultural settings. One Sky contains fifteen linked narratives, along with a story that expresses the book's title. The consequences of Israeli armed forces in West Bank cities and the development of security checks during the second uprising in 2000 are the main and significant topics of the book.

== Summary ==
One Sky conveys the daily life of Palestinians during a time of conflict using a set of linked stories that reflect their day-to-day lives. The novel also showcases the Second Intifada, which brought political disagreements and conflicts between governments, as well as a period that transformed how people lived and interacted. These periods shaped group activity, personal identity, and daily life. While the character reflects on balancing the past and the future, she also helps the reader to learn more about how other people lived and experienced life. The story reveals how the protagonist confronts various hardships related to the true feeling of being accepted, along with a complicated bond among friendships and other individuals encountering the same cases. Through countless communications with many people, she changes her understanding of family, love, and justice.

In the first story, "Other Cities," she shows the lived reality of Palestinians who returned to their country but remained without official identity papers, through the story of Umm Hussein.

In "Route Number One," she gives a comparison of East Jerusalem before and after its occupation in 1968, using nostalgic childhood memories, with a focus on the children who used to earn a living by selling chewing gum to passing drivers in the city center.

"A Garden That Can Only Be Watered by the Rain" follows Najah and Badr on a journey to Hebron to perform prayers at the Ibrahimi Mosque, asking for rain. It develops into a tragic love story, and also addresses the division of the mosque between Muslims and Jews, and the confiscation of Palestinian land due to settlement expansion and construction of the West Bank barrier.

In the titular story, "One Sky," the female narrator ventures out during curfew in Ramallah wanting to see the blue sky, and ends up rescuing an injured bird. She releases it once the curfew is temporarily lifted.

Other stories in the collection include "The Bridge of Dreams," "Dinosaur Park," "Helicopter on the Road to Beit Hanina," "The Stranger's House," "Seven Boys," "Party," "Do We Have Any News Tonight?," "A Game of Getting to Know Each Other," "A Turtle Ascends to Its Sky," "The Grey," and "A Train Journey."

== Publication ==
One Sky was released as a collection of 15 stories, titled after one of them. The book followed Badr's earlier novel, A Balcony Over Al-Fakahani (1983), which centered on Palestinian presence in Lebanon. In 2008, Badr held a signing ceremony in Beirut for the book, alongside a new edition of A Balcony Over Al-Fakahani.

Badr has described her writing as a response to both personal experiences and the broader history of Palestine. She emphasizes this during the signing ceremony, highlighting the significance of the themes of exile and resistance in the novel. “Since childhood, the world has been defined for me by its proximity to or distance from Palestine… The people of the place have always been the harbor that embraces the ships of exile imposed upon us. Therefore, the people of the place and its characters in my novels and stories are not the only ones who were allowed to stay and live there, but also those who were forcibly and arbitrarily removed from it in the name of asylum or displacement.”

She says that she has a similar creative and writing process for both novels and stories. She draws the material for her work from personal experiences, stating that "Perhaps it writes me as life writes its stories, characters, and gestures, but above all, it is the place for me." The place, in One Sky anchors the narrative for Badr because it is paramount to her characters' stories and lives.

== Main themes ==
=== Identity and belonging ===
The question of Palestinian identity in the post-Oslo period is a central theme in One Sky, particularly among those who returned to Palestine after exile but remained socially and politically unstable due to restrictions. Through characters such as Umm Hussein, who builds a life and raises a family without official documentation, Badr highlights the fragility of belonging when legal recognition and autonomy are denied. In the opening story, "Other Cities," Umm Hussein travels from Hebron to Ramallah with her children but lacks an ID card, forcing her to borrow a neighbor's instead. Throughout her journey, she experiences fear and anxiety while passing through checkpoints. The novel portrays Palestinian identity as inseparable from the ongoing occupation, displacement, and resistance.

=== Internal and external conflict ===
One Sky depicts conflict on multiple levels. Externally, characters confront Israeli incursions and settlement expansion, especially in cities such as Hebron. Internally, the stories represent emotional conflict using themes of grief, fear, longing, and exile. While some characters physically return to Palestinian cities, they remain psychologically marked by the experience of exile. Human relationships between lovers, family members, and friends are shaped by the shared cultural environment. The narrative shows how historical events produce intimate consequences in personal lives and self-perception.

=== Gender and shared human consciousness ===
Badr thematically emphasizes shared humanity beyond gender boundaries by using both masculine and feminine first-person indicators. Although some stories are narrated from a male "I" and others from a female "I", the tenderness and emotions behind them remain consistent. This technique supports the novel's broader argument that suffering and belonging are collective experiences not confined to one gender.

=== Memory and transformation ===
The novel frequently contrasts between past and present landscapes, especially in depictions of Jerusalem before and after 1967. Childhood memories of daily life are placed against later images of occupation and social decline. Several stories also explore tensions between balancing respect for tradition and adapting to changing social realities.

=== The sky as a unifying symbol ===
The sky functions as a unifying symbol that connects the fragmented experiences of the people and nature. While cities and communities are divided by occupation, the sky is a shared constant that encompasses human life, animals, and the land. In A Garden That Can Only Be Watered by the Rain, Najah's garden cannot survive without rainfall, and she undertakes a journey to Hebron to perform a prayer for rain at the Ibrahimi Mosque. The garden, like the people, is fragile yet persists under the same sky. Similarly, in stories involving birds and other animals, the sky is both a source of freedom and danger. A tortoise leaving its hiding place is attacked by a predatory bird, and a grey bird escapes from the narrator's care. The sky in Badr's novel is witness to oppression and fear, but also a shared space that connects all living beings and their experiences.

== Genre and classification ==
One Sky is classified under social and realist literature. It goes deep into analyzing human issues shaped by cultural and societal transformations. Throughout the story, we follow a female protagonist who is lost and is searching for her own identity.

The novel also belongs to the literature of migration and exile, as it shows the reader the life of the Palestinians who had to migrate to another country, and how that had a big impact on their identity and way of thinking. The novel illustrates a precise image of the constant psychological struggle that appears when trying to balance traditions and modern life, a match that is often explored in Arabic literature.

One Sky also shows that at the end of the day, no matter where they come from, background, or identity, people still face the same problems, such as loss, fear, rejection, and look for the same solutions.

Moreover, the novel can be considered as part of the female literature, as the story is about a woman struggling with challenges related to identity and independence under social and cultural constraints. The novel also reflects the social pressure on women.

== Reception ==
One Sky received critical attention for its portrayal of Palestinian life under Israeli occupation, and its use of everyday experiences to make a statement. Lebanese news outlet Al Akhbar praised Badr's efforts to avoid the "stereotypical image of the Palestinian," by illustrating the complexities of exile and everyday life in an occupied Palestine. The review further says that Palestinian writers are often treated as representatives of a national cause instead of ordinary literary artists, leading to expectations of what Palestinian art "should" represent. One Sky offers an alternative to those conventional depictions by focusing on the importance of place, land, and people.

Palestinian critic and novelist Ahmad Harb noted the symbolic use of the sky in the novel, and how Badr links it to birds and other fragile animals to represent both freedom and danger under the occupation. The sky ultimately serves as a unifying motif. Harb stated that, "The sky in (One Sky) is not a destination for prayer and spiritual elevation of energy and alienation in the homeland, as if the writer's situation is saying: The places are many and the exile is one, the circumstances are many and the danger is one, and there is a siege here and a siege there, a siege on earth and a siege in the sky."
