= Economy of Northern Cyprus =

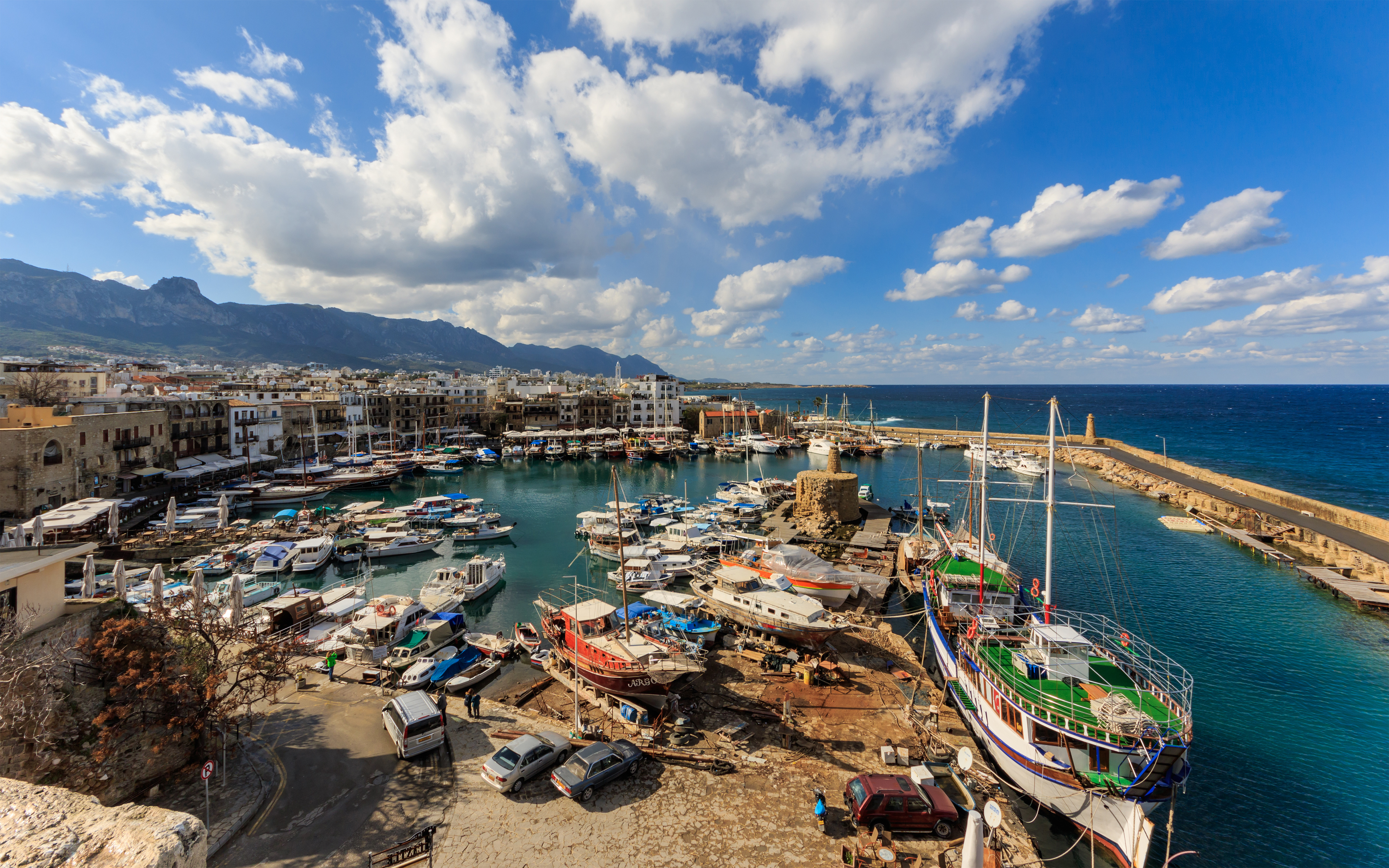
- Kyrenia is the second economic center of Northern Cyprus.
- Currency: Turkish lira (₺) (TRY)
- Fiscal year: Calendar year
- Trade organisations: OTS (observer), ECO (observer)
- Country group: Developing country; High-income economy

Statistics
- GDP: ▲$7.135 billion (nominal, 2024)
- GDP rank: 159th (nominal, if ranked according to the IMF in 2025)
- GDP growth: ▲7.3% (2023)
- GDP per capita: ▲$17,498 (Nominal, 2024)
- Inflation (CPI): ▼39,20% (2025 October)
- Labour force: ▲185,607 (2024)
- Unemployment: ▼9% (2022)
- Average gross salary: 55,040₺ / 1085 £ / 1430$ (per month, 2025)
- Average net salary: 51,860₺ / 1005£ / 1345$ (per month, 2025)
- Main industries: agriculture, industry, construction, tourism

External
- Exports: ▲$145 million (2022)
- Export goods: Dairy products, raw and processed citrus, rakı, scrap, chicken, potatoes
- Main export partners: Turkey 96.1%; United Kingdom 2.1%; Germany 0.8%; Netherlands 0.4%; Greece 0.3%; (2018)
- Imports: ▲$1.572 billion (2022)
- Main import partners: Turkey 87.1%; United Kingdom 4.5%; Germany 2.4%; Netherlands 1.8%; Greece 1.4%; (2018)
- All values, unless otherwise stated, are in US dollars.

The economy of Northern Cyprus is dominated by the services sector (69% of GDP in 2007), which includes the public sector, trade, tourism and education. Industry (light manufacturing) contributes 22% of GDP and agriculture 9%. Northern Cyprus's economy operates on a free-market basis, or mixed economy system with a significant portion of administration costs funded by Turkey. Northern Cyprus uses the Turkish lira as its currency, which links its economic situation to the economy of Turkey.

As of 2014, the GDP per capita of Northern Cyprus was $15,109, and the GDP was $4.039 billion. The economy grew by 4.9% in 2014 and 2.8% in 2013, meaning that Northern Cyprus is growing faster than the Republic of Cyprus. Northern Cyprus has seen economic growth and declining unemployment throughout the 2010s; the unemployment rate in 2015 was at 7.4%, down from 8.3% in 2014. The inflation rate in June 2015 was at 3.18%.

== Embargo, debt and Turkey's role ==
Because of its international status and the embargo on its ports, the TRNC is heavily dependent on Turkish military and economic support. All TRNC exports and imports have to take place via Turkey, unless they are produced locally, from materials sourced in the area (or imported via one of the island's recognised ports) when they may be exported via one of the legal ports.

The continuing Cyprus problem adversely affects the economic development of the TRNC. The Republic of Cyprus, as the internationally recognised authority, has declared airports and ports in the area not under its effective control, closed. All UN and EU member countries respect the closure of those ports and airports according to the declaration of the Republic of Cyprus. The Turkish community argues that the Republic of Cyprus has used its international standing to handicap economic relations between TRNC and the rest of the world.

There are three-year-long programs of financial and economical cooperation between Turkey and Northern Cyprus. In 2013, Turkey transferred 430 million Turkish liras to the Turkish Cypriot budget, comprising 5.7% of the GNP, and one-seventh of the state budget. The aid from Turkey had decreased from 7.1% of the budget in 2004. In addition, 2013 saw a budget deficit amounting to 7.2% of the GNP, and a credit amounting to 6.6% of the GNP was obtained from Turkey. Between 2004 and 2013, Northern Cyprus constantly had a budget deficit, peaking at 14.0% of the GNP in 2009. This prompted constant borrowing from Turkey, reaching a maximum of 12.2% of the GNP in 2009. In December 2014, Northern Cyprus had a total debt of 23 million Turkish liras, 7.5 million liras being external debt to Turkey. This amounted to 1.5 times the GDP.

== Economic growth ==
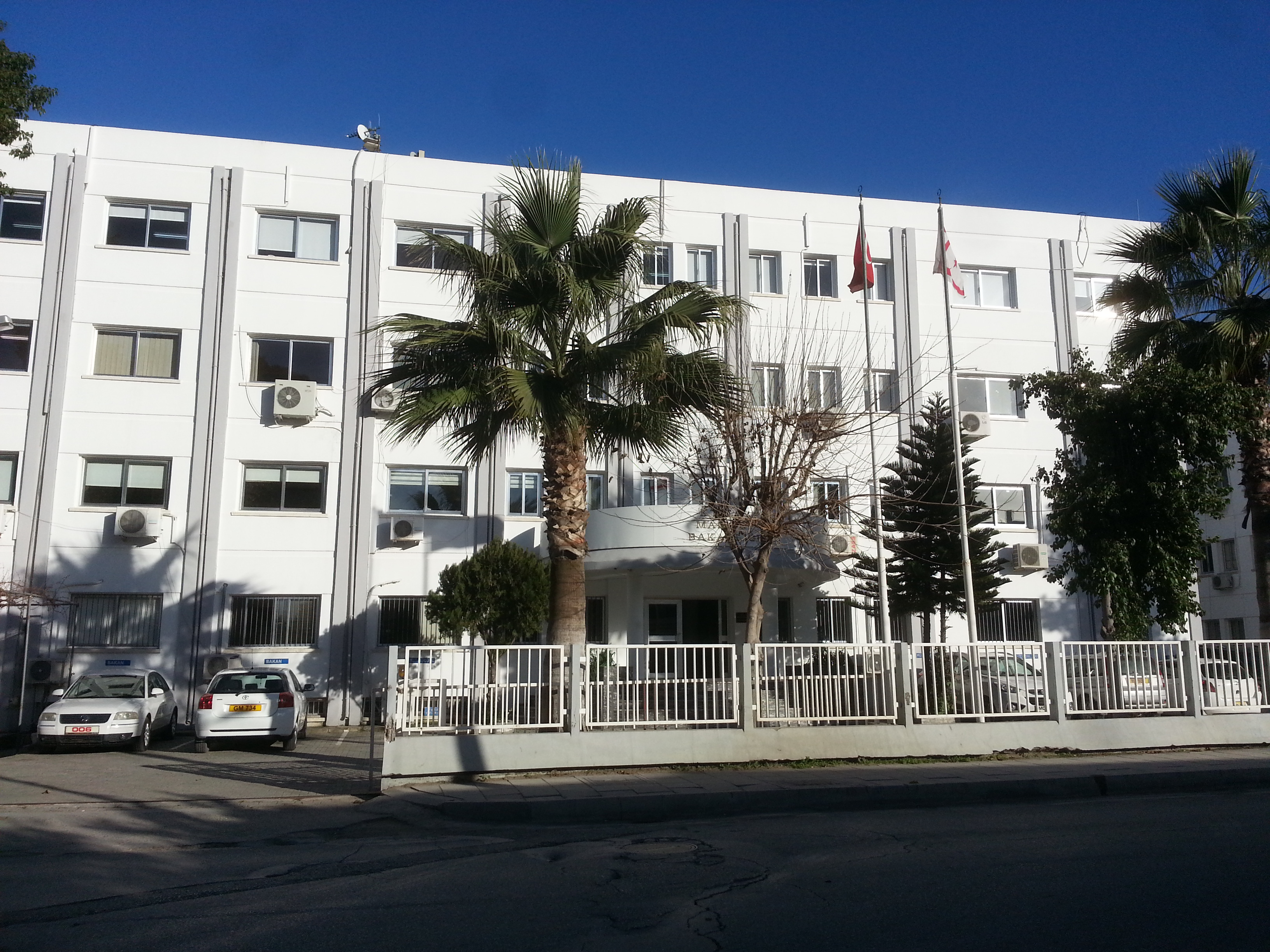
The Ministry of Finance of Northern Cyprus

Despite the constraints imposed by the lack of international recognition, the TRNC economy turned in an impressive performance. The nominal GDP growth rates of the TRNC economy in 2001-2005 were 5.4%, 6.9%, 11.4%, 15.4% and 10.6%, respectively. The real GDP growth rate in 2007 is estimated at 2%. This growth has been buoyed by the relative stability of the Turkish Lira and a boom in the education and construction sectors.

The growth was further buoyed by the arrival of northern European home buyers, investing in holiday villas. Over 10,000 British people, including expatriates, purchased holiday villas in Northern Cyprus to live in permanently, or to visit during the summer months. These settlers generated over $1 billion between 2003 and 2007.

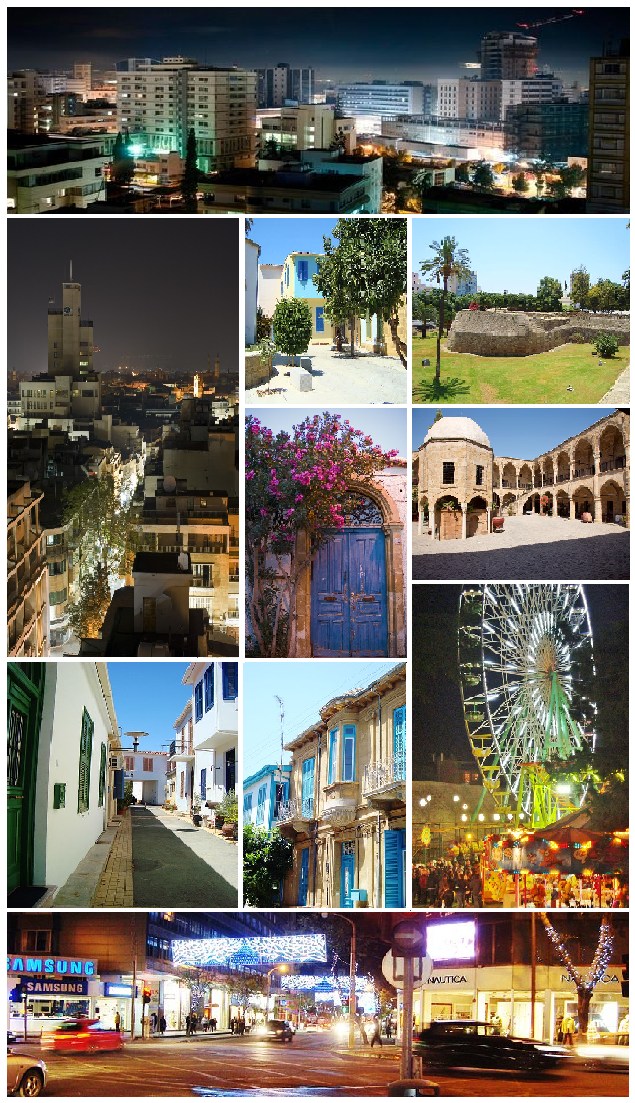
Important places of the tourism sector, which is one of the important incomes of Northern Cyprus

Between 2002 and 2007, Gross National Product per capita more than tripled (in current US dollars):

- US$4,409 (2002)
- US$5,949 (2003)
- US$8,095 (2004)
- US$10,567 (2005)
- US$11,837 (2006)
- US$14,047 (2007, provisional)

Studies by the World Bank show that the per capita GDP in TRNC grew to 76% of the per capita GDP in the Republic of Cyprus in PPP-adjusted terms in 2004 (US$22,300 for the Republic of Cyprus and US$16,900 for the TRNC). Official estimates for the GDP per capita in current US dollars are US$8,095 in 2004 and US$11,837 in 2006.

== Development ==
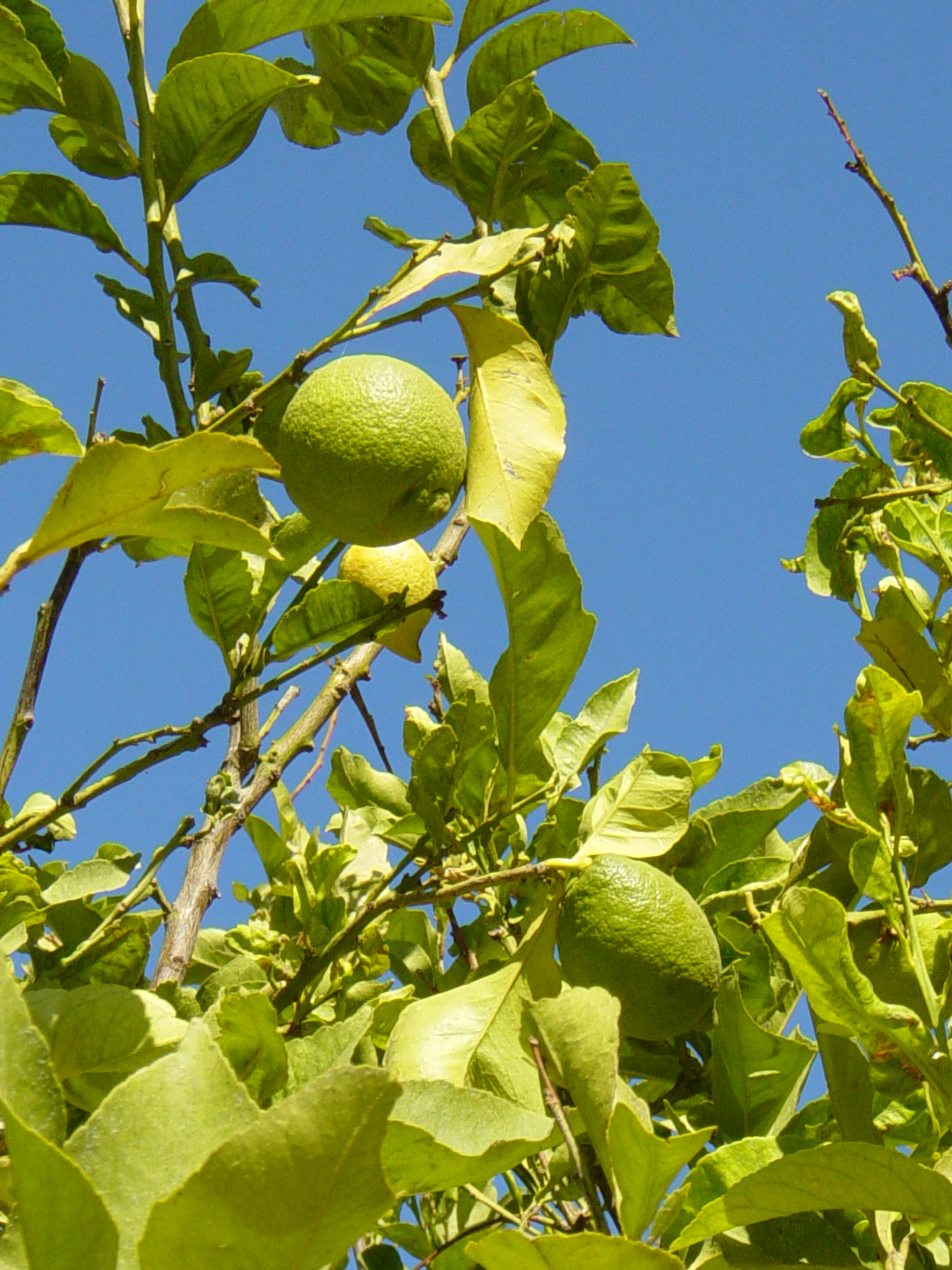
Lemons in Northern Cyprus. Citrus is the good that Northern Cyprus exports the most.

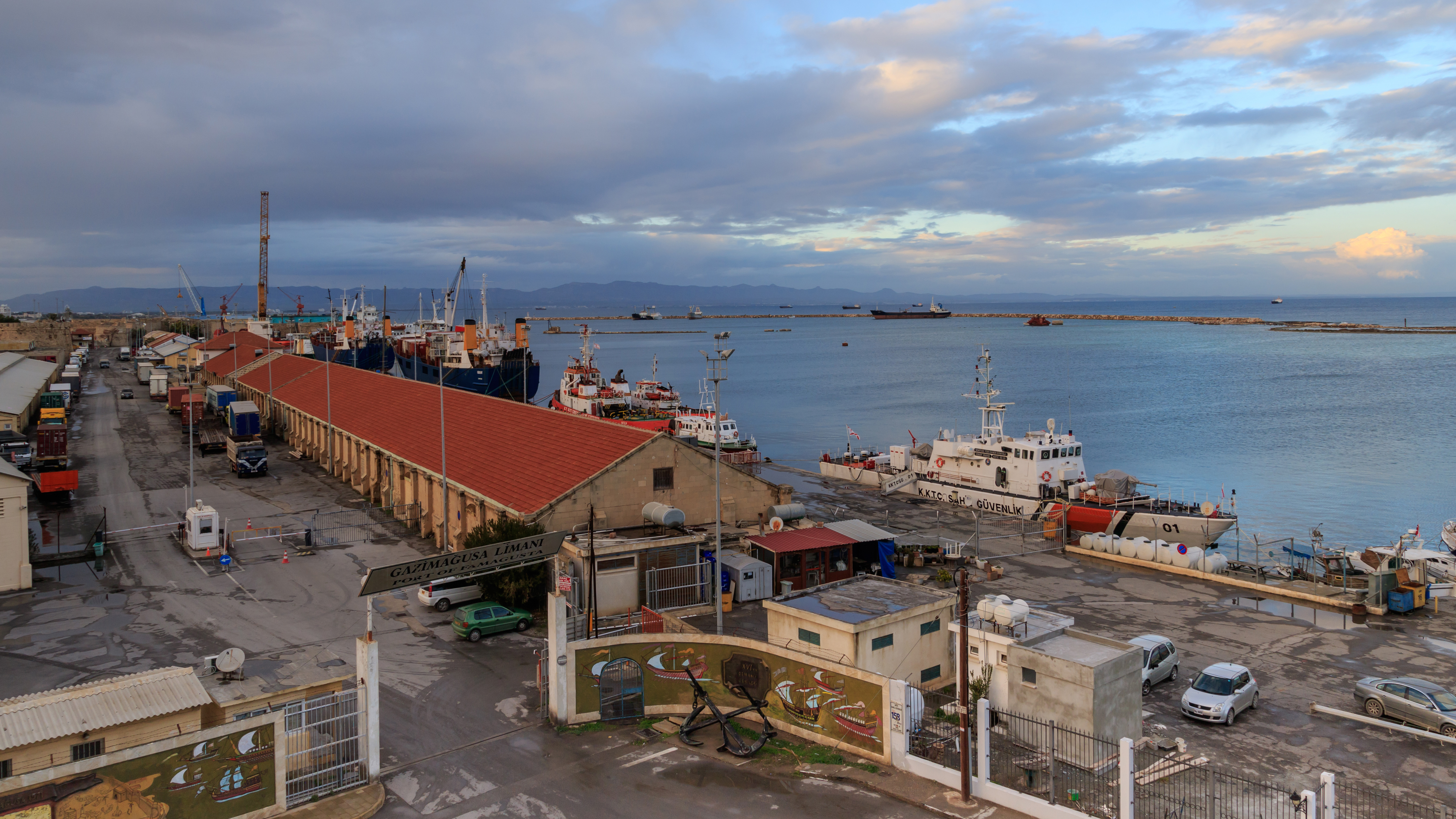
One of the most important revenue ports of Northern Cyprus

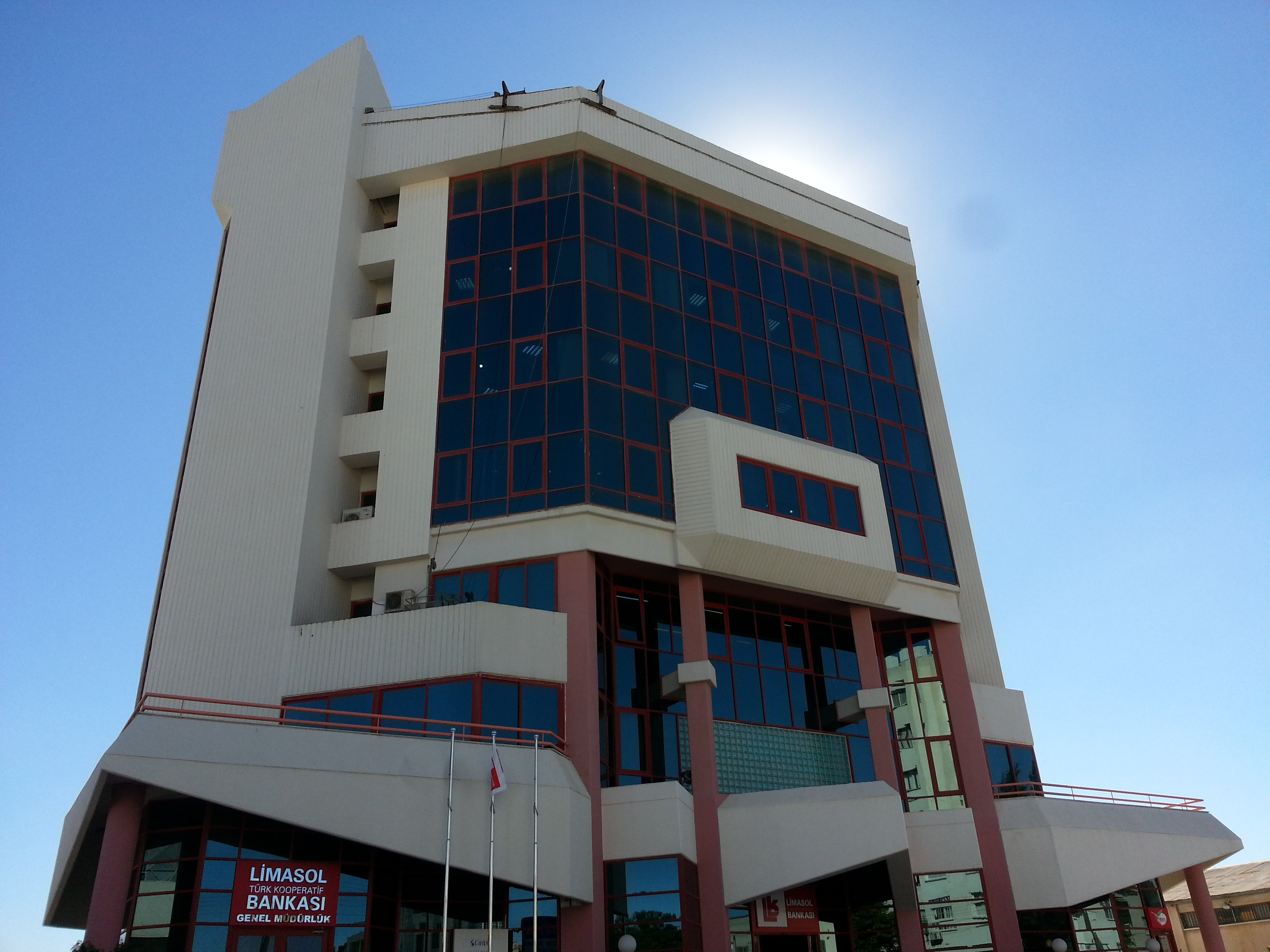
Headquarters of the Limassol Turkish Cooperative Bank in North Nicosia, the economic hub

Although the TRNC economy has developed in recent years, it is still dependent on monetary transfers from the Turkish government. Under a July 2006 agreement, Ankara is to provide Northern Cyprus with an economic aid in the amount of $1.3 billion over three years (2006–2008). This is a continuation of ongoing policy under which Turkish government allocates around $400 million annually from its budget to help raise the living standards of the Turkish Cypriots.

=== Tourism ===
The tourism sector of Northern Cyprus has seen high levels of constant growth. 1.23 million tourists visited Northern Cyprus in 2013, 920,000 of these being from Turkey. The number of tourists had doubled since 2006, which saw 570,000 tourists. The revenue from tourism was at $616 million, up from $390 million in 2009 and $288 million in 2004.

The number of tourist beds increased to 17,000 in 2011.

=== Banking ===
The Banking sector grew 114% from 2006 to 2011. TRNC Development Bank is a member of the Association of Development Financing Institutions in Asia and the Pacific (ADFIAP).

== Exports and imports ==
WTO statistically counts products from Northern Cyprus as products from Turkey.

In 2014, the exports of Northern Cyprus were at $130 million, with an increase of 11.9% from 2013, and the imports were at $1.51 billion, with an increase of 3.6% from 2013. The main trading partner is Turkey, as of 2014, 64.7% of Turkish Cypriot imports are from and 58.5% of Turkish Cypriot exports are to Turkey. Middle Eastern countries are the destination of 30.3% of Turkish Cypriot exports and their share in the exports of Northern Cyprus has greatly increased, being at only 17.8% at 2006. The share of exports to the European Union has greatly decreased from 15.0% in 2006 to 6.2% in 2014, while imports from the European Union were 15.5% of all imports.

The agricultural sector is the source of the vast majority of exported goods. In 2013, 32.4% of exported products were raw agricultural products and 50.8% were processed agricultural products. 8.7% of the exports was minerals, 3.0% clothing and 5.1% other industrial products. Raw citrus by itself constituted 19.1% of all exports. The most important exported products, in order of the revenue they produce, are dairy products, citrus, rakı, scrap, citrus concentrate, chicken, and potatoes.

Below is a table showing the distribution of exports of Northern Cyprus by goods:

Distribution of TRNC exports by goods (US dollar)
| | 2007 | 2008 | 2009 | 2010 |
| Citrus | 22,692,324 | 20,502,086 | 13,910,934 | 27,166,238 |
| Dairy products | 20,650,394 | 21,628,852 | 20,074,239 | 25,836,381 |
| Rakı | 4,482,406 | 6,653,821 | 8,413,631 | 7,669,936 |
| Scrap | 8,141,653 | 7,283,664 | 4,237,831 | 6,477,316 |
| Ready-made clothing | 6,790,020 | 3,727,264 | 2,326,900 | 4,022,957 |
| Citrus concentrate | 3,192,255 | 662,939 | 1,746,922 | 3,007,110 |
| Gypsum | 1,894,924 | 3,927,030 | 2,490,925 | 1,889,140 |
| Pharmaceuticals | 955,693 | 1,009,966 | 649,465 | 1,573,599 |
| Leather products | 1,269,816 | 908,411 | 594,751 | 461,562 |
| Other products | 8,975,744 | 6,354,090 | 9,002,188 | 12,579,609 |
| Exports to the Republic of Cyprus | 4,639,584 | 11,006,015 | 7,615,978 | 5,746,061 |
| Total | 83,684,813 | 83,664,138 | 71,063,766 | 96,419,909 |

== See also ==
- Central Bank of the Turkish Republic of Northern Cyprus
- Ministry of Finance of Northern Cyprus
- Northern Cyprus and the World Bank
- Economy of the Middle East
