= Akhmatov =

Akhmatov, feminine: Akhmatova is a Russian language patronymic surname derived from the given name Akhmat. Notable people with the surname include:

- Anna Akhmatova (1889–1966), Russian-Soviet poet
- Elizaveta Akhmatova (1820–1904), Russian writer
- Navruza Akhmatova (born 2005), Uzbekistani para-athlete
- Raisa Akhmatova (1920–1992), Chechen poet
- Rasambek Akhmatov (born 1996), French professional footballer

== See also ==
- Akhmatov Fjord, Severnaya Zemlya island, Russia
- 3067 Akhmatova, asteroid
