= College of Fine Arts (University of Tehran) =

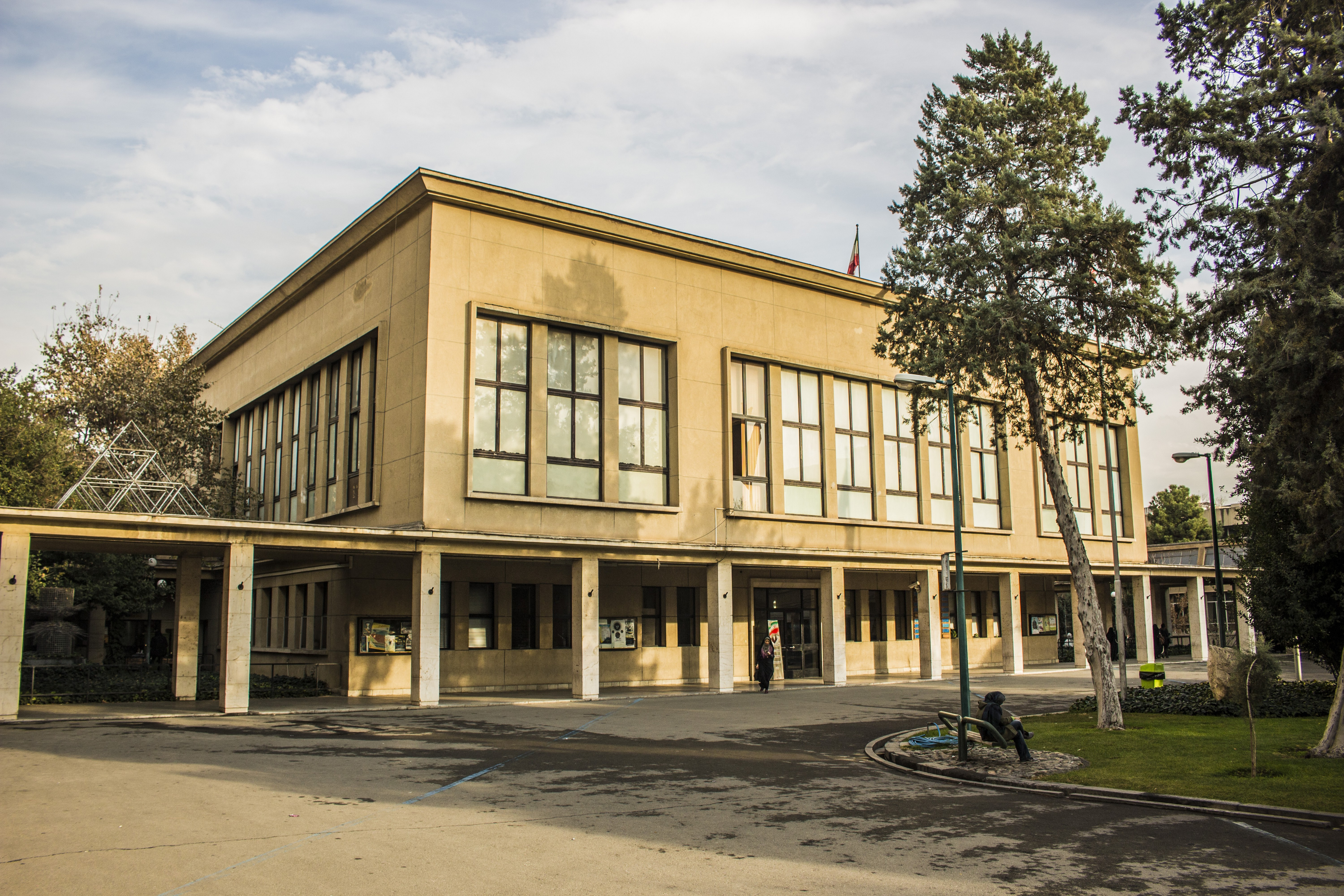
- Type: Public research university
- Established: 1949
- Founders: André Godard
- Location: Tehran, Iran; 35°42′12″N 51°23′42″E
- Campus: Urban (Main Campus)
- Language: Persian / English
- Colors: Cyan
- Website: finearts.ut.ac.ir

College of Fine Arts, previously known as the Faculty of Fine Arts, is one of the campuses of University of Tehran where various art disciplines are taught. This faculty is one of the oldest art higher education centers in Iran.

People like André Godard, Mohsen Foroughi, Hooshang Seyhoun, Mohammad-Reza Lotfi were among the heads of this faculty.

== See also ==
- Ahmad Esfandiari
- Ahmad Nateghi
