= Ministry of Finance of Northern Cyprus =

Ministry of Finance
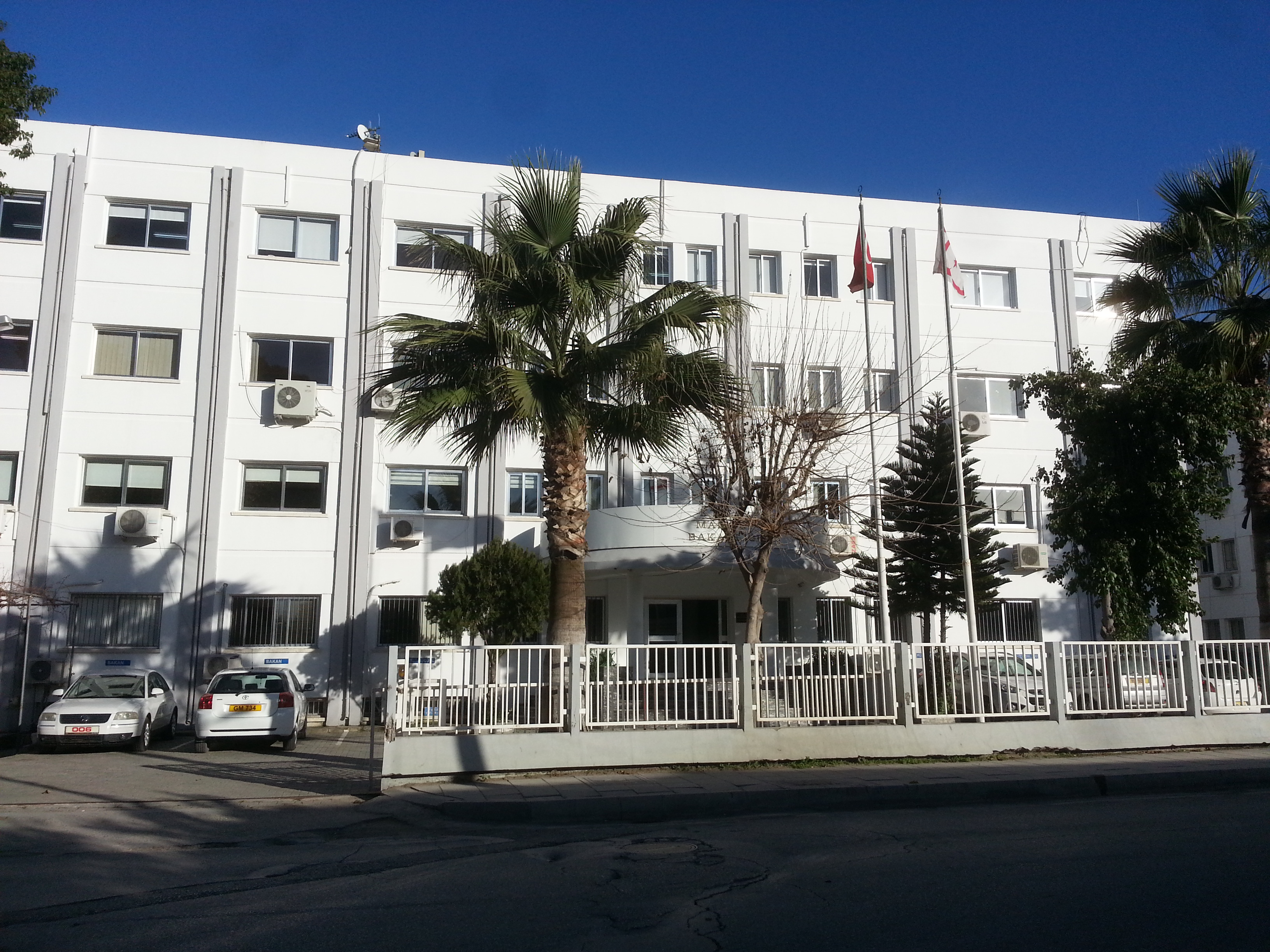

Agency overview
- Jurisdiction: North Cyprus
- Headquarters: Lefkosia
- Agency executive: Özdemir Berova, Minister
- Parent agency: Government of Northern Cyprus
- Website: www.maliye.gov.ct.tr

Ministry of Finance of the Turkish Republic of Northern Cyprus (Kuzey Kıbrıs Türk Cumhuriyeti Maliye Bakanlığı), is the ministry in North Cyprus responsible for government finance.

== Ministers of Finance ==
- Rüstem Z. Tatar, August 1974 - July 1976
- Mehmet Altinay, July 1976 - December 1976
- Mustafa Çağatay, December 1976 - July 1977
- Tansel Fikri, July 1977 - April 1978
- Hüseyin Erdal, April 1978 - December 1978
- Hakkı Atun, December 1978 - August 1981
- Salih Coşar, August 1981 - July 1985
- Taşkent Atasayan, July 1985 - September 1986
- Mehmet Bayram, September 1986 - June 1990
- Nazif Borman, June 1990 - March 1992
- Salih Coşar, March 1992 - January 1994
- Onur Borman, January 1993 - January 1995
- Salih Coşar, January 1995 - December 1998
- Mehmet Bayram, December 1998 - January 2004
- Ahmet Uzun, January 2004 - May 2009
- Ersin Tatar, May 2009 - June 2013
- Zeren Mungan, June 2013 - July 2015
- Hasan Başoğlu, July 2015 - October 2015
- Birikim Özgür, October 2015 - April 2016
- Serdar Denktaş, April 2016 - May 2019
- Olgun Amcaoğlu, May 2019 - December 2020
- Dursun Oğuz, December 2020 - February 2022
- Sunat Atun, February 2022 - April 2022
- Olgun Amcaoglu, April 2022 - May 2022
- Sunat Atun, May 2022 - July 2022
- Alishan Glory, July 2022 - August 2023
- Özdemir Berova, August 2023 - Incumbent

== See also ==
- Government of Northern Cyprus
- Central Bank of the Turkish Republic of Northern Cyprus
- Economy of Northern Cyprus
