= Ahmet Bozer =

American businessman (born 1960)

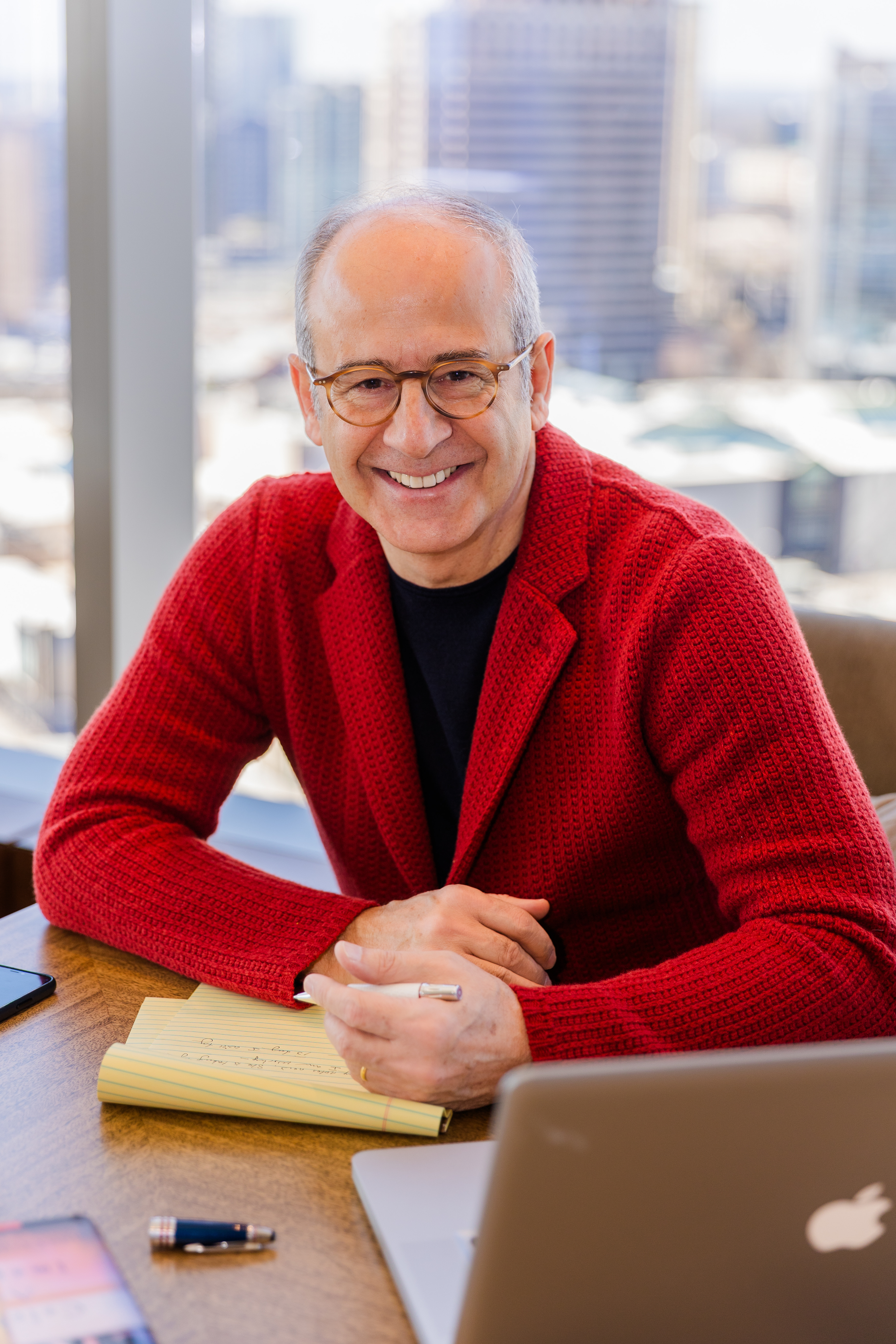
- Born: 1960 (age 65–66); Istanbul, Turkey
- Education: TED Ankara Koleji; Middle East Technical University; Georgia State University
- Occupations: Executive vice president and president of Coca-Cola International
- Parent: Ali Bozer (father)

Ahmet C. Bozer (born 1960) is a Turkish business executive. He is executive vice president and president of Coca-Cola International, which consists of The Coca-Cola Company's Asia Pacific, Europe, Eurasia & Africa, and Latin America operations.

== Early years ==
Bozer was born to Ali Bozer, an academic of Commercial Law and politician, 1960 in Istanbul, Turkey. He finished TED Ankara Koleji and studied Business Administration at the Middle East Technical University in Ankara. Later, he earned an MBA degree in Business Information Systems from Georgia State University.

== Career ==
After beginning as a consultant and instructor, Bozer was employed by Coopers and Lybrand, where he had various roles in audit, consultancy and management in the five years there.

In 1990, he joined Coca-Cola USA as Financial Control Manager at the company's headquarters in Atlanta, Georgia. Bozer was appointed Region Finance Manager at the Turkish Enterprise in 1992.

He was Finance Director and Deputy Managing Director of The Coca-Cola Company Bottling Operations in Turkey from 1994 to 1999. After serving as the managing director of Coca-Cola Bottlers of Turkey (CCBT), Bozer became the President of Eurasia & Middle East Division based in Istanbul, Turkey on January 1, 2006. On July 1, 2007, he was appointed President of the Eurasia and Africa Group, which comprises a total of more than 90 countries, and served until December 31, 2012. In 2013, he became Executive Vice President and President of Coca-Cola International.

Mr. Bozer is a member of the Board of Directors of Hepsiburada and Esas Holding and the advisory board of Swire Coca-Cola.

== See also ==
- Barbaros Özbugutu
