= Öcal =

Öcal is a Turkish surname. It may refer to:

- Ahmet Öcal (born 1979), Belgian footballer of Turkish descent
- Arda Ocal (born 1981), Turkish-Canadian TV and radio broadcaster
- Mert Öcal (born 1982), Turkish model
- Sevilay İmamoğlu Öcal (born 1984), Turkish female handball player
