= Fauzia Ahmad =

American professor of electrical engineering

- Education: University of Pennsylvania (BS, PhD)
- Scientific career
- Institutions: Temple University; Villanova University
- Thesis: Analysis and design of wide-band imaging arrays based on the coarray (1997)
- Doctoral advisor: Saleem A. Kassam

Fauzia Ahmad (Urdu: فوزیہ احمد) is an associate professor of electrical engineering at Temple University. Her research considers statistical signal processing and ultrasonic guided wave structural health monitoring. She serves as associate editor of the IEEE Transactions on Aerospace and Electronic Systems and Geoscience and Remote Sensing Society. She is a Fellow of the Institute of Electrical and Electronics Engineers and SPIE.

== Education and early career ==
Ahmad studied electrical engineering at the University of Pennsylvania, where she earned her master's degree in 1996. She completed her doctorate under the supervision of Saleem Kassam in 1997. Her PhD thesis considered the design and analysis of passive imaging arrays. After completing her doctoral degree she moved to Pakistan, where she worked at the National University of Sciences & Technology as an assistant professor in the College of Engineering. In 2000, she joined the Fizaia College of Information Technology in Pakistan as an assistant professor.

== Career and research ==
She joined Villanova University in 2002, where she was appointed as the director of the Radar Imaging Laboratory. She was made a research professor at Villanova in 2013, and worked in the Antenna Research Laboratory. Here she developed multiple-input and multiple-output (MIMO) radar systems. Ahmad worked on urban sensing and Through the Wall Radar Imaging (TWRI) to visualise areas that become obscured; allowing for the collection of information and making of intelligent decisions. TWRI can permit the identification of building layouts, an understanding of activities taking place inside a building and the behind-the-wall imaging of targets. TWRI may have applications in the military, for example in search and rescue, as well as in reconnaissance. Ahmad proposed the use of compressed sensing to expedite data acquisition and avoid bottlenecks without compromising quality in the processing of radar imaging. She developed handheld radar systems to work in the TWRI sensors. She also developed non-coherent approaches for TWRI detection and localisation, which corrects for shifts in the target location and can estimate ambiguities in the wall thickness.

Ahmad joined Temple University in 2016. Her research considers statistical signal and array processing as well as radar imaging, MIMO radar and target localisation. Working with Bing Ouyang at Florida State University Ahmad has developed technologies for underwater sensing, using inflatable passive arrays. Their Underwater Inflatable Co-prime Sonar Array (UICSA) use low size, weight and power (SWaP) compression. The sonar array is an inflatable structure that can be packed and stowed in a compact space, whilst a sparse co-prime array configuration can resolve a high number of source. The two components in combination can act to reduce the dimensions of the sonar array as well as reducing the number of hydrophones that need to be used.

At Temple University Ahmad has expanded her research into healthcare, and started to develop multi-modal sensing devices to monitor patient progress. She is interested in the use of depth cameras, like the Microsoft Kinect, and radar-based monitoring systems. Ahmad's devices will not monitor vital signs but collect information about different activities, and use machine learning in conjunction with signal processing techniques.

== Awards and honors ==
Ahmad is a Fellow of the Institute of Electrical and Electronics Engineers and SPIE. She has chaired various conferences for SPIE, including the Comprehensive Sensing Conference Series and Big Data Conference. She serves on the Franklin Institute Committee on Science and the Arts.

- 2014 IEEE Transactions on Aerospace and Electronic Systems M. Barry Carlton Award
- 2014 IEEE Transactions on Aerospace and Electronic Systems Harry Rowe Mimno Award

== Selected publications ==
- Ahmad, Fauzia (2005). "Synthetic aperture beamformer for imaging through a dielectric wall". IEEE Transactions on Aerospace and Electronic Systems. 41 (1): 271–283. Bibcode:2005ITAES..41..271A. doi:10.1109/TAES.2005.1413761. S2CID 34181395.
- Ahmad, Fauzia (2008). "Three-dimensional wideband beamforming for imaging through a single wall". IEEE Geoscience and Remote Sensing Letters. 5 (2): 176–179. Bibcode:2008IGRSL...5..176A. doi:10.1109/LGRS.2008.915742. S2CID 1069408.
- Ahmad, Fauzia (2007). "Autofocusing of Through-the-Wall Radar Imagery Under Unknown Wall Characteristics". IEEE Transactions on Image Processing. 16 (7): 1785–1795. Bibcode:2007ITIP...16.1785A. doi:10.1109/TIP.2007.899030. PMID 17605377. S2CID 16678537.
- Fauzia, Ahmad (2012). Compressive Sensing. SPIE Press. ISBN 978-0-8194-9043-8.

She has contributed chapters on radar, waveforms and compressive imaging to several books. Ahmad serves as associate editor of the IEEE Transactions on Aerospace and Electronic Systems and Geoscience and Remote Sensing Society, and serves on the editorial board of IET Radar, Sonar and Navigation.
