= Central Bank of the Turkish Republic of Northern Cyprus =

Central Bank

Central Bank of the Turkish Republic of Northern Cyprus Kuzey Kıbrıs Türk Cumhuriyeti Merkez Bankası (in Turkish)

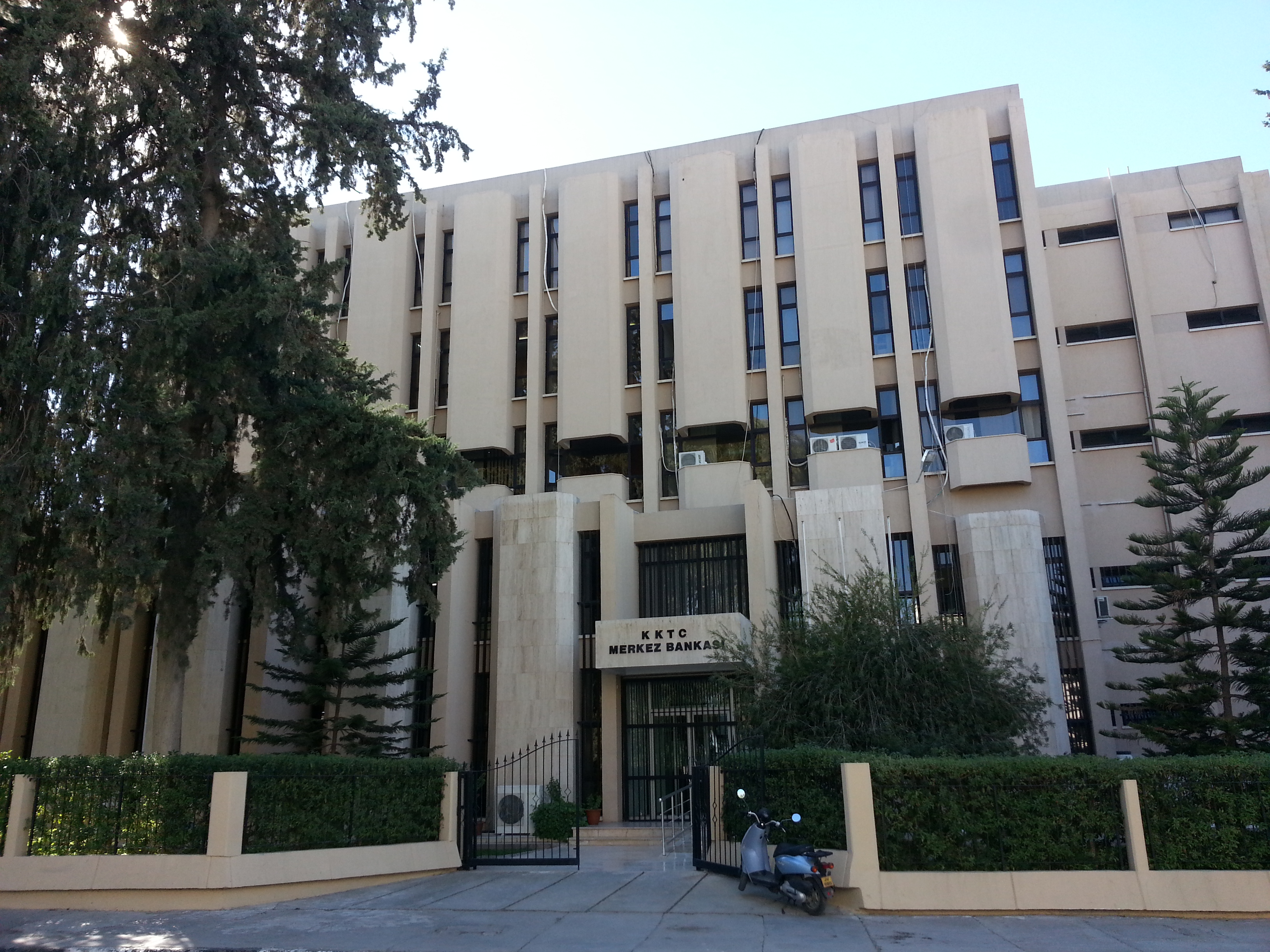
- HQ in North Nicosia
- Headquarters: North Nicosia, Northern Cyprus
- Established: April 29, 1983; 42 years ago
- Chairman: Rifat Günay
- Central bank of: Northern Cyprus
- Currency: Turkish lira TRY (ISO 4217)
- Website: mb.gov.ct.tr
- The main functions of the central bank are provided by the Central Bank of the Republic of Turkey.

The Central Bank of the Turkish Republic of Northern Cyprus (Turkish: Kuzey Kıbrıs Türk Cumhuriyeti Merkez Bankası), is the central bank of Northern Cyprus. It was established on 16 May 1983. Northern Cyprus uses the Turkish lira as currency and the main central banking functions are provided by the Central Bank of the Republic of Turkey.

The bank's headquarters are located in North Nicosia, the capital of Northern Cyprus.

The bank is also a member of Islamic Financial Services Board (IFSB).

== Chairmen ==
Name	Took office	Left office	Notes
Demirhan Sayiner	1983	2001	
Erdoğan Küçük	? - 2002	May 2007	
Ahmet Tugay	May 2007	2011	
Bilal San	2011	2016 - ?	
Mehmet Emin Özcan	February 2017	June 2017	
Rifat Günay	May 2018	Incumbent	

== See also ==
- Ministry of Finance of Northern Cyprus
- Economy of Northern Cyprus
- Turkish lira
