= IEEE Transactions on Aerospace and Electronic Systems =

Scientific journal

- Discipline: Avionics, radar, sonar, spacecraft
- Language: English
- Edited by: Gokhan Inalhan

Publication details
- Former names: IRE Transactions on Space Electronics and Telemetry
- History: 1951-present
- Publisher: IEEE Aerospace and Electronic Systems Society
- Frequency: Bimonthly
- Impact factor: 3.491 (2021)

Standard abbreviations
- ISO 4: IEEE Trans. Aerosp. Electron. Syst.

Indexing
- CODEN: IEARAX
- ISSN: 0018-9251 (print); 1557-9603 (web)
- LCCN: 2005214268
- OCLC no.: 39742480

Links
- Journal homepage; Online access

IEEE Transactions on Aerospace and Electronic Systems is a bimonthly peer-reviewed scientific journal published by the IEEE Aerospace and Electronic Systems Society. It covers the organization, design, development, integration, and operation of complex systems for space, air, ocean, or ground environment. The editor-in-chief is Gokhan Inalhan. According to the Journal Citation Reports, the journal has a 2020 impact factor of 4.102.

== Publication history ==
The origins of IEEE Transactions on Aerospace and Electronic Systems are found in the Institute of Radio Engineers (IRE). In 1948 the IRE formed a number of "Professional Groups" to accommodate the post-war growth in its membership. Professional groups were designed to meet the needs of specialized groups within the larger IRE membership by holding meetings, sponsoring conferences, publishing specialized journals. Three journals, sponsored and published in parallel by three professional groups, merged to form IEEE Transactions on Aerospace and Electronic Systems in 1965.

The first was the Transactions of the IRE Professional Group on Airborne Electronics (1951–1952) published by the Professional Group on Airborne Electronics beginning in 1951. In response to the expanding scope of the professional group, the group changed its name and the group's journal became Transactions of the IRE Professional Group on Aeronautical and Navigational Electronics (1953–1954). The journal name was updated to IRE Transactions on Aeronautical and Navigational Electronics (1955–1960) in 1955. As the scope the professional group continued to evolve, the professional group name and its journal became the IRE Transactions on Aerospace and Navigational Electronics (1961–1962). Accompanying the merger of the IRE and the American Institute of Electrical Engineers (AIEE) to form the Institute of Electrical and Electronics Engineers (IEEE) in 1963, the journal changed its name to IEEE Transactions on Aerospace and Navigational Electronics (1963–1965).

The second journal was first published by the Professional Group on Radio Telemetry and Remote Control in 1954 and was called Transactions of the IRE Professional Group on Radio Telemetry and Remote Control (1954). In 1955 the journal name was updated to the IRE Transactions on Telemetry and Remote Control (1955–1958). As the scope of the professional group evolved with the US space program, the professional group changed its name and the journal was renamed IRE Transactions on Space Electronics and Telemetry (1959–1962). With the IRE and AIEE merger to form IEEE, the journal name was updated to IEEE Transactions on Space Electronics and Telemetry (1963–1965).

The third journal began with the newly formed Professional Group on Military Electronics in 1957: IRE Transactions on Military Electronics (1957–1962). The journal changed its name in the wake of the IRE and AIEE merger to form IEEE to IEEE Transactions on Military Electronics in (1963–1965).

In 1965 four groups (the Aerospace Group, the Aerospace and Navigational Electronics Group, the Military Electronics Group, and the Space Electronics and Telemetry Group) merged to form the Aerospace and Electronic Systems Group. The last three of the four groups published separate journals. These three journals were combined to form IEEE Transactions on Aerospace and Electronic Systems (1965–present). In 1973, the Aerospace and Electronic Systems group became the Aerospace and Electronic Systems Society. (Note: IEEE groups began transitioning into today's "Technical Societies" starting in 1972.)

Since its founding in 1965, the following have served as Editor-in-Chief:

- Harry Mimno 1965-1975
- William Brown 1976-1988
- Jack Harris 1988-1995
- Cary Sptizer 1996-1999
- Dale Blair 1999-2005
- Peter Willett 2006-2011
- Lance Kaplan 2012-2017
- Michael Rice 2018-2022
- Gokhan Inalhan 2023-present

== M. Barry Carlton Award ==
Each year, since 1962, the M. Barry Carlton Award is given to the author(s) of the best paper to appear in the journal. The award was established in 1957 by the Professional Group on Military Electronics and initially given to the best paper to appear in the IRE Transactions on Military Electronics (1957–1962). The award was named after M. Barry Carlton, former Assistant Secretary, Research and Development in the United States Department of Defense who died in the 1956 Grand Canyon mid-air collision.

The first award was given in 1962 to David Barton for the paper "The Future of Pulse Radar for Missile and Space Range Instrumentation" that appeared in the October 1961 issue of the IRE Transactions on Military Electronics. After the 1965 merger that formed the Aerospace and Electronic Systems Group, the first paper published in IEEE Transactions on Aerospace and Electronic Systems to receive the award was Raymond Robbiani for "High Performance Weather Radar" that appeared in the April 1965 issue. A list of all recipients of the award is available on AESS M. Barry Carlton Award website.
