= Ahmed Houssein =

Djiboutian football manager

Personal information
- Place of birth: Djibouti

Managerial career
- Years: Team
- 2007: Djibouti

Ahmed Houssein is a Djiboutian professional football manager.

== Career ==
In 2007, he coached the Djibouti national football team.
