= Ahmed Adel =

Ahmed Adel may refer to:

- Ahmed Adel Abdel Moneam (born 1987), Egyptian football goalkeeper
- Ahmed Adel (footballer, born 1984), Egyptian football right back
- Ahmed Adel Mesilhy (born 1994), known as Ahmed Adel, Egyptian handballer
