= Ahmed Mohamed Sharaf El-Din =

Sudanese footballer

Personal information
- Date of birth: 1938 (age 87–88)

International career
Years	Team	Apps	(Gls)
- Sudan

Ahmed Mohamed Sharaf El-Din (born 1938) is a Sudanese footballer. He competed in the men's tournament at the 1972 Summer Olympics.
