= Lance Kaplan =

Lance Kaplan is an electrical engineer at the Army Research Laboratory in Adelphi, Maryland. He received a B.S. in electrical engineering from Duke University in 1989, followed by an M.S. and Ph.D. in electrical engineering from the University of Southern California in 1991 and 1994 respectively. His doctoral dissertation was "Fractal Signal Modeling: Theory, Algorithms and Applications."

He was named a Fellow of the Institute of Electrical and Electronics Engineers (IEEE) in 2016 for his contributions to signal processing and information fusion for situational awareness.
