= Kumbwada =

Rural kingdom

Kumbwada is a rural kingdom in Niger State, the northern part of the Federal Republic of Nigeria with a population of about 33,000 individuals.

== History ==
In 1958 when Prince Amadu Kumbwada stated he wished to succeed to the throne of Kumbwada after his mother the queen, he became immediately ill and was rushed out of the kingdom; he never returned. Kumbwada has been ruled by women for at least six successive generations since its conquest by Princess Magajiya Maimuna of Zaria; the last queen, Queen Hajiya's grandmother, died aged 113.

== Government and politics ==
Kumbwada is known for having the only known system for state rule by women only. Kumbwada is currently being ruled by Queen Hajiya Haidzatu Ahmed and her court. An ancient curse keeps males off the throne, according to locals. The Queen's royal title is inherited on the female side of the family, and the current Queen's daughter, Idris, is the queen's successor.

=== List of rulers ===
- Hajiya Maimuna (–1998)
- Hajiya Haidzatu Ahmed (1998–2021)
- Idris (2021–)

== Economy ==
Most of the people of Kumbwada are farmers.
