= Hajiya Haidzatu Ahmed =

Queen of Kumbwada

Queen of Kumbwada
- Reign: 1998 – 25 June 2021
- Predecessor: Hajiya Maimuna
- Successor: Idris
- Born: Kumbwada, Niger State, Nigeria
- Died: 25 June 2021
- Issue: Queen Idris; Prince Danjuma Salih

Hajiya Haidzatu Ahmed (1966–2021) was a Nigerian traditional ruler who reigned as the Queen of Kumbwada from 1998 to 2021. As queen, she ruled firmly against domestic violence against women and was a proponent of women's education.

== Biography ==
Hajiya was the ruler of the ancient rural kingdom of Kumbwada in Niger, with a population of about 33,000. She succeeded her grandmother as queen of the kingdom, which is ruled by women, in 1998. Her daughter, Idris, was her heir. She also had a son, Danjuma Salih.

As queen, Hajiya settled marriage and land disputes, kept the peace, and was an advocate for the education of women. In 2010, she told CNN that, "Women must be educated. Education means women can be anything they want to be." She rules firmly against divorce and domestic violence against women in Kumbawada, the queen grants women hearings.

She was Muslim. She died on 25 June 2021.
