= Barbaros Özbugutu =

Turkish entrepreneur

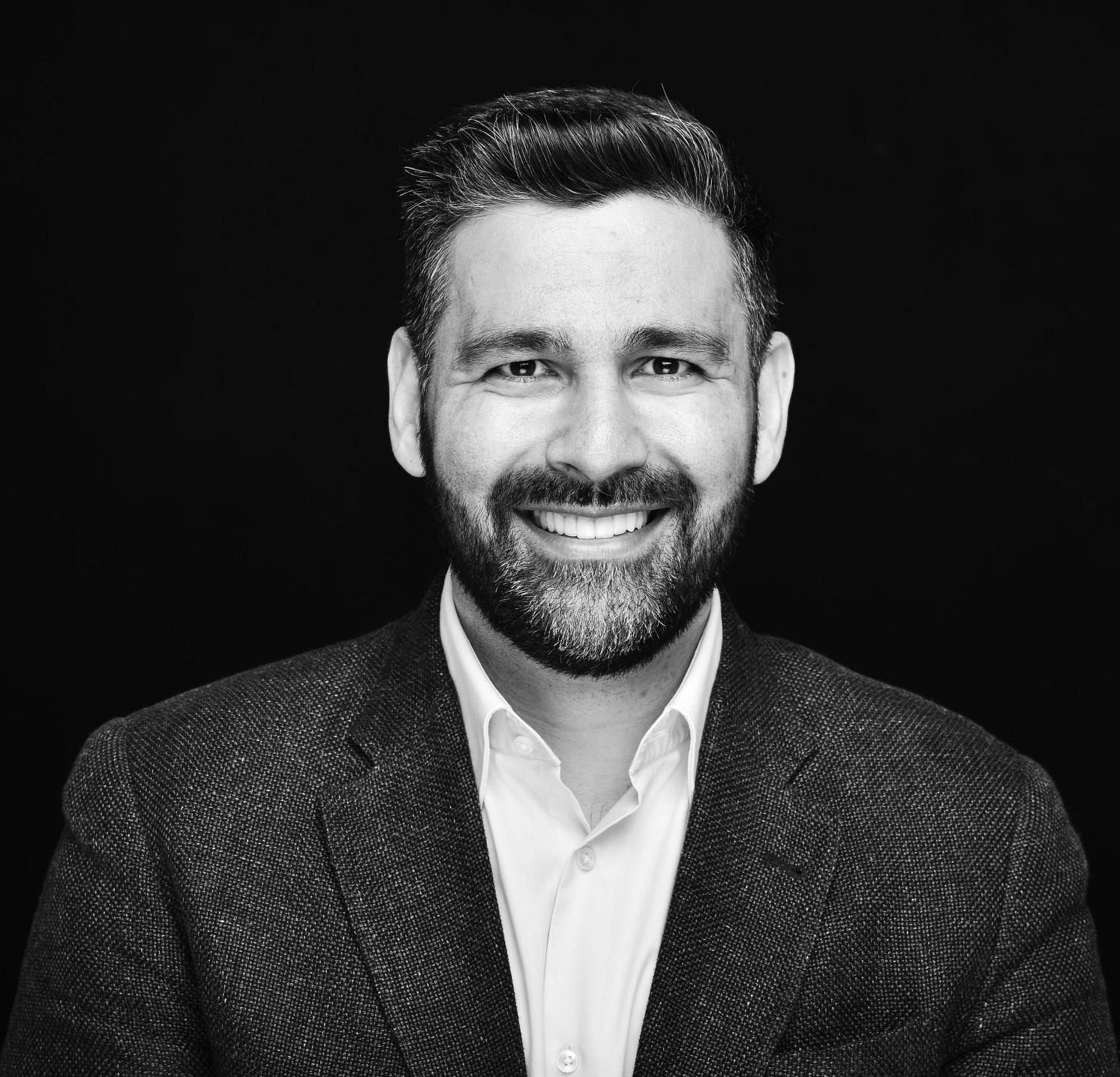
- Özbugutu in 2020
- Born: Germany
- Occupations: Entrepreneur, investor
- Known for: Co-Founder iyzico, Founder DeBa Group
- Spouse: Devrim Özbugutu
- Children: 2 (Dila and Eda)
- Website: www.deba-group.com

Barbaros Özbugutu is a German born Turkish entrepreneur that is focused on the fintech and technology sectors. He is the founder of DeBa Group S.A. SPF and DeBa Ventures and was the co-founder and CEO of iyzico, a leading Turkish online payment service provider acquired by PayU in 2019.

== Career ==
Barbaros Özbugutu began his business career at Telefónica Germany as Team Manager of the Business Service Center from 1999 to 2005. In 2005, Özbugutu started to work in the financial sector, when he joined Firstdata.

In 2007, he moved to Telecash, a subsidiary of Firstdata, taking on the role of Director responsible for the SME market. In 2010, Özbugutu joined Klarna GmbH, a payment company, as Vice President of Sales Germany, where he worked until 2012. He migrated to Turkey to establish his business.

In 2013, Özbugutu co-founded iyzico, an online payment service provider, to democratize financial services in Turkey. As CEO, he led simplifying payment processes for businesses and helped companies in Turkey digitize their operations. By 2015, iyzico raised a Series B funding round, attracting international investors. Under Özbugutu's leadership, iyzico grew rapidly, offering secure payment services to over 1,000 marketplaces and 100,000 online merchants, including brands like Amazon, Nike, and Zara. The company raised $28 million in funding from investors such as the International Finance Corporation (IFC), Speedinvest, Vostok Emerging Finance, 212 Capital, and Amadeus Capital Partners.

In 2019, iyzico was acquired by global payment giant PayU. After the acquisition and until 2022, Özbugutu continued to lead iyzico as the chairman of the board and the chief executive officer of PayU Turkey.

In 2023, Özbugutu founded DeBa Group S.A. SPF, a family office that manages the wealth of the Özbugutu family, and DeBa Ventures, a firm dedicated to supporting and investing in early-stage tech startups.

He went on to serve as Founding Partner at DeBa Ventures. At DeBa Ventures, Özbugutu and his team focus on supporting entrepreneurs by providing strategic investment and assistance at various stages of a company's growth, including pre-seed, seed, and growth phases. DeBa Ventures differentiates itself by allocating 10% of its profits to the employees of its portfolio companies and has investments in startups like Silverflow, Payrails, Leasy, and Roamless.

== Philanthropy ==
Özbugutu also serves on the board of directors of Endeavor Turkey, a global nonprofit that supports high-impact entrepreneurs, and a mentor of the "Turcorn 100 Program", a national vision that is implemented nationally, not publicly, under the leadership of the Republic of Türkiye Ministry of Industry and Technology, with the partnership of corporate companies, entrepreneurial ecosystem players and public institutions.

== Personal life ==
Barbaros Özbugutu has been married to Devrim Özbugutu since 2005, and they have two daughters, Dila and Eda.
