= Hafsa Ahmed =

New Zealand business studies academic and community leader

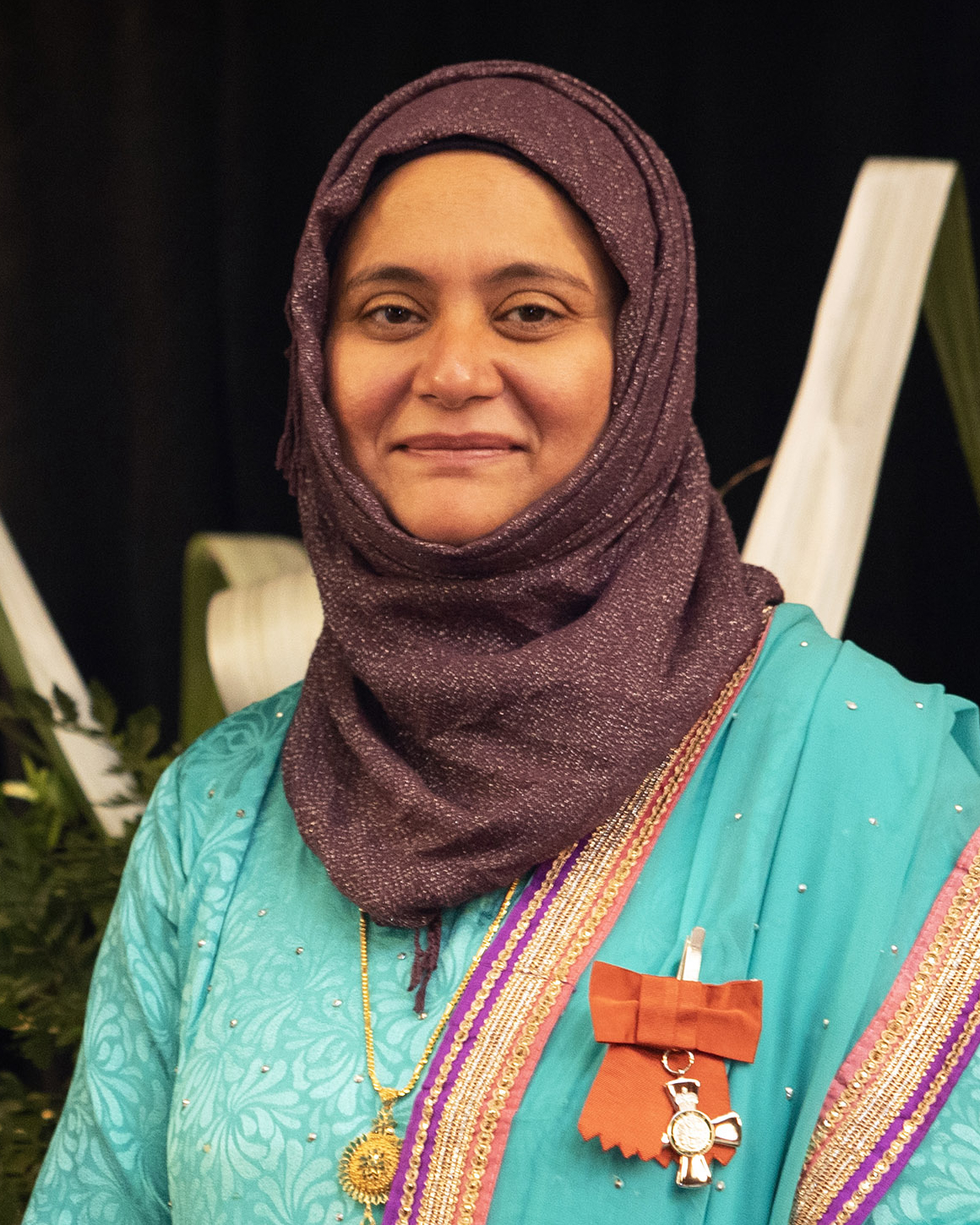
- Awards: Member of the New Zealand Order of Merit

Academic background
- Education: Lincoln University, Osmania University
- Thesis: Organisational adaptation or environmental selection? An enhancement of the evolutionary change theory based on a study of the New Zealand electricity industry (2014)
- Doctoral advisor: David A Cohen, Michaela Balzarova

Hafsa Ahmed MNZM is a New Zealand academic, and is a lecturer in the Department of Global Value Chains and Trade at Lincoln University. In 2023, Ahmed was appointed a Member of the Order of New Zealand for services to ethnic communities and women.

== Academic career ==
Ahmed is originally from Hyderabad, India, and has a BE and an MBA from Osmania University. She worked for HSBC Holdings in London before moving to New Zealand in 2007. Ahmed completed a PhD titled Organisational adaptation or environmental selection? An enhancement of the evolutionary change theory based on a study of the New Zealand electricity industry at Lincoln University in 2014, and worked as a research assistant at the university and as a policy advisor at Environment Canterbury. Ahmed then joined the faculty of the Department of Global Value Chains and Trade at the university. She specialises in 'stakeholder ecosystem management'. Ahmed is a member of the Association of Change Management Professionals, and is their New Zealand lead.

== Voluntary work ==
In 2016 Ahmed and her husband co-founded the Lady Khadija Charitable Trust, of which she is also a trustee. The trust is a registered charity that runs a variety of projects to support communities and individuals, such as leadership workshops for ethnic women, storytelling projects to deepen intercultural understanding of immigrant journeys, and exhibitions and events.

Ahmed served as the Chair of the Canterbury Interfaith Society from 2021, and sits on the board of Ako Ōtautahi – Learning City Christchurch.

== Honours and awards ==
In the 2023 New Year Honours, Ahmed was appointed a Member of the Order of New Zealand, for services to ethnic communities and women.

== Selected works ==
- Ahmed, Hafsa; Michaela Balzarova; David A Cohen (2014). "To sell or not to sell; that is the question? Stakeholders' supremacy in the New Zealand electricity industry". Journal of Management and Organization. 20 (3): 410–414. doi:10.1017/jmo.2014.27. Wikidata Q127772485.
- Ahmed, Hafsa; David A. Cohen (2019). "Stakeholder attributes and attitudes during privatisation: a New Zealand case study". International Journal of Public Sector Management. 32 (2): 157–174. doi:10.1108/ijpsm-09-2017-0258. Wikidata Q127772475.
- Ahmed, Hafsa; Michaela Balzarova; David A Cohen (2015). "Evolutionary change stimuli and moderators – evidence from New Zealand". Journal of Organizational Change Management. 28 (4): 546–564. doi:10.1108/jocm-11-2013-0226. Wikidata Q122150300.
