= Ahmed bin Saif Al Nahyan =

Ahmed Bin Saif Al Nahyan
- Born: 7 November 1963 (age 63); Al Ain, United Arab Emirates

Ahmed bin Saif Al Nahyan (Arabic: أحمد بن سيف آل نهيان; born 7 November 1963) is a member of the Al Nahyan family in the United Arab Emirates and the founder and was the chairman of Etihad Airways.

== Early life, education, and career ==
Ahmed Bin Saif Al Nahyan is a member of the ruling family of Abu Dhabi. Born in Al Ain in 1966, he graduated from United Arab Emirates University in Al Ain and went on to complete his master's degree at the University of Southern California, followed by a doctorate degree in Egypt. Ahmed Bin Saif is a member of the Abu Dhabi Executive Council and was Chairman of Abu Dhabi Aircraft Technologies, a post he has held since 2001. Currently, chairman of Rotana Jet Aviation.

Prior to his career at Etihad Airways, in 1992, Ahmed was the under-secretary of Abu Dhabi's Civil Aviation Authority. From 2001 to 2009 he was the Chairman of GAMCO. In addition, for a period of one year (2007–2008) he was also the Chairman of the Department of Civil Aviation, Abu Dhabi.

He is also a former CEO of Gulf Air from January 1996 until December 2000. Furthermore, he is a qualified commercial captain, flying Airbus 340 and Boeing 767 of Gulf Air. Moreover, he also trained pilots in the UAE armed forces on Boeing 767s and flew C130s in the air force of the United Arab Emirates.

He received the 'Innovation in Business' award at a ceremony held at the Future Capitals World Summit in Abu Dhabi in January 2009.

He set up Etihad Airways in 2003 and held the post of chairman until May 2009. During his chairmanship Etihad Airways received numerous awards. Additionally, captain Ahmed Bin Saif is currently flying the Airbus A319 of Rotana Jet.

He was a member of Executive Council of Abu Dhabi.
