= Anis Ahmed (disambiguation) =

Anis Ahmed (born 1973) is a Pakistani field hockey player.

Anis Ahmed may also refer to:

- Anis Ahmad (born 1944), Pakistani social scientist and educationist
