= Ahmad Nateghi =

Iranian photojournalist (born 1958)

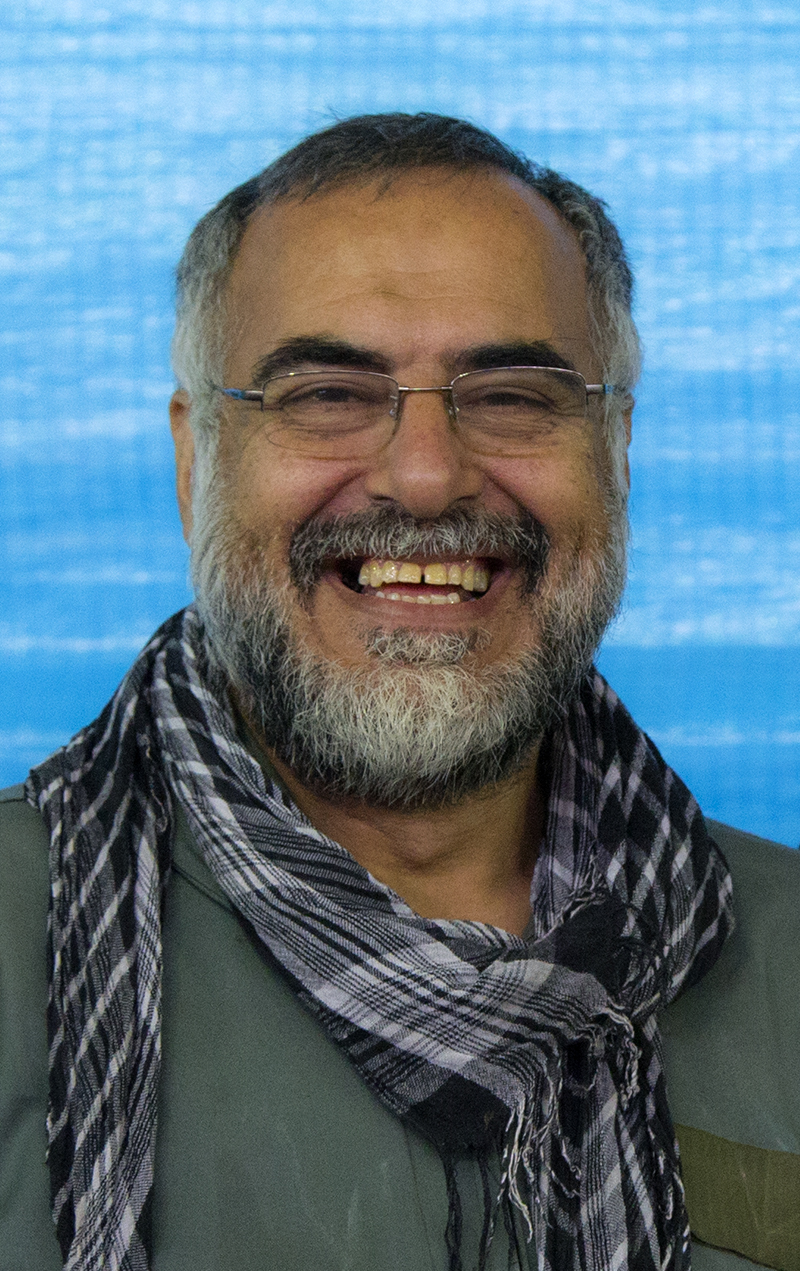
Ahmad Nateghi

Ahmad Nateghi (Persian: احمد ناطقی; born 1958) is an Iranian photographer and photojournalist, who is best known for his photos of the Iran–Iraq War.

== Life ==
Ahmad Nateghi was born in 1958, in the south of Tehran. He started photography as a teenager in the 1970s. Nateghi graduated from the Faculty of Fine Arts of the University of Tehran in the field of directing.

In the years 1978 to 1980, during the Iranian revolution and the beginning of the Iran-Iraq War, he photographed several big events as an amateur. He started professional photography when the Islamic Republic took power, and became the head of the photo department of the Islamic Republic News Agency in 1983, and during the Iran-Iraq war, he recorded many famous photographs. His unique photos of the Halabja massacre made him famous. He took the infamous photo of Omar Khawar. His last street exhibition was held 21 years after the Halabja tragedy in 2009 in the same places where the incident happened, which he was welcomed and surprised by the people of Halabja. After holding the exhibition in Halabja, Ahmad Nateghi was searching for the living people of his pictures for two years and he found 7 of them in his most famous pictures, and after talking to them, he prepared pictures of them and a collection of other Halabja massacre pictures along and made it into a collection titled "The Sound of Silence" in Persian, Kurdish and English.
