= Akhmat =

Akhmat (Russian: Ахма́т) is a given name, a variant of Ahmad. It may refer to:

- Akhmad Kadyrov (1951–2004), a Russian and Chechen politician, after whom have been named:
  - Akhmat-Arena, a multi-use stadium in Grozny, Chechnya, Russia
  - FC Akhmat Grozny, a Russian professional football club based in Grozny
  - Akhmat Tower
  - Fight Club Akhmat (FCA), a professional sports club from the Chechen Republic
  - Z-STS Akhmat, Russian armored vehicle manufactured by Remdiesel
  - 141st Special Motorized Regiment of the Russian National Guard, also known as the Akhmat special forces unit
- Akhmat Salpagarov, Russian politician
