= Northern Cyprus and the World Bank =

The Turkish Republic of Northern Cyprus (TRNC) is a de facto state situated on the northern portion of the island of Cyprus. Due to its uncertain international status, the World Bank does not extend any financial loans to Northern Cyprus. However, other types of cooperation exist.

== International status with the World Bank ==
The World Bank recognizes and works with 189 member countries which are allowed to receive funding from various branches of the World Bank such as the IBRD or the IDA. Due to its uncertain political status, Northern Cyprus as a state cannot receive financial funding from any branch of the World Bank. In its SABER report, the World Bank refers to Northern Cypriot governmental institutions in quotation marks, in which they specifically state that use of governmental names as it appears in the Northern Cypriot constitution does not suggest a recognition of the state itself.

== World Bank involvement ==
=== 2016 SABER report ===
The contributions made by the World Bank to the Northern Cyprus consist of guidelines and detailed reports about its economy. The SABER (Systems Approach for Better Educational Results) report focused on three main points: strategic framework, system oversight, and service delivery. The Turkish Cypriot community scored 2.5, 2.0, and 1.9 respectively in the three areas of the Work Force Development Framework, being rated as an "Emerging" country in terms of its workforce development. The main recommendations that World Bank officials made in their report was improvements in the budget allocated for job-specific training schemes, setting its socioeconomic goals at achievable levels, and improving the technology for data collection.

=== Peace in Cyprus and the World Bank ===
An EU-funded survey was carried out in December 2018 by the World Bank. This survey aimed to gather data from both the Greek Cypriot and Turkish Cypriot communities and put it into circulation in an effort to promote peace on the island through better informing both communities. The most striking statistic obtained during the survey was a 173% increase in the total number of motor vehicles passing the border from the Greek Cypriot side into the Turkish Cypriot side. Overall, both communities displayed a more positive attitude towards a solution to the Cyprus problem.

=== Economic repercussions of unification for Cypriots ===
In an interview conducted by Turkish Cypriot and Greek Cypriot journalists with Dirk Reinermann, who is the manager of Southern Europe at the World Bank, and a team of Economists at the World Bank, Reinermann made remarks about the World Bank's official position regarding unification on the island. Overall, Reinermann posits that a reunified Cyprus would be beneficial for both communities. However, the structural discrepancies between the EU-regulated Greek Cypriot banking and financial sectors relative to the unregulated Turkish Cypriot banking and financial sectors would make economic convergence of the two communities a challenge. Nevertheless, “a bigger pie to share" sums up Reinermann's stance on the economic benefits of reunification.

=== World Bank research on higher education ===
Relative to its small population, the TRNC has a very large international student population. Whilst the Turkish Cypriot community had 300,000 inhabitants in 2016, the country attracted around 85,000 students. Therefore, the World Bank report has indicated the fact that higher education seems to be a high-potential avenue through which Northern Cyprus could grow economically. Whilst 60 percent of all students are from Turkey, this provides readily available highly educated labor for both the public and private sectors. At the same time, the weaknesses of the Turkish Cypriot higher education system includes the very small number of Turkish Cypriot students and the "limited absorptive capacity" of the economy. The most important recommendation the report makes is the regulation of the quality of education offered by the Turkish Cypriot authorities.
