= Ahmed Nizam =

Indian cricketer (born 1986)

Ahmed Nizam (born 17 May 1986) is a former Indian cricketer. He is a left-handed batsman and a left-arm slow bowler who played for Jammu and Kashmir. He was born in Bombay.

Nizam spent his youth cricketing career in Mumbai, playing for the Under-16s, the Under-19s and the Under-22s before entering into first-class cricket.

Nizam made his first-class debut for Jammu and Kashmir in November 2008.
