= Ahmad Esfandiari =

Iranian painter (1922–2012)

- احمد اسفندیاری
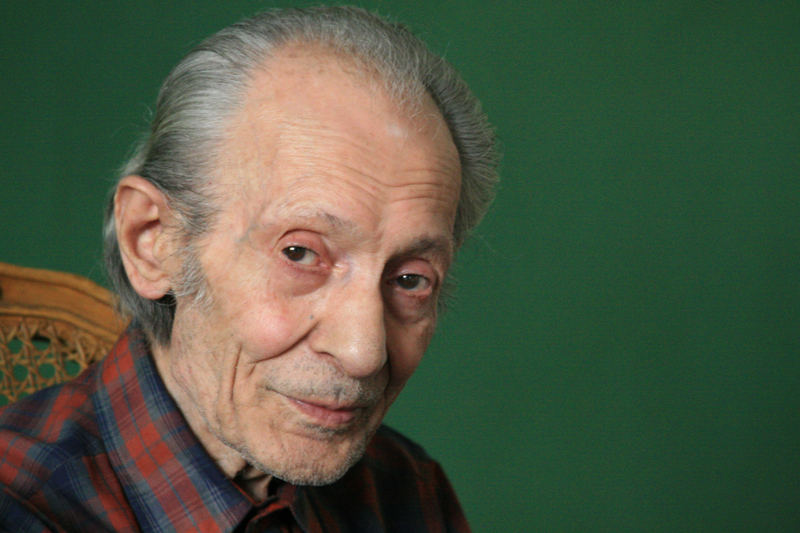
- Born: May 22, 1922; Tehran, Pahlavi Iran (now Iran)
- Died: March 19, 2012 (aged 89); Tehran, Iran
- Education: College of Fine Arts (University of Tehran)
- Occupation(s): Painter, teacher
- Father: Abdullah Adl Esfandiari

Ahmad Esfandiari (Persian: احمد اسفندیاری, romanized: Aḥmad Isfandyārī; May 22, 1922 – March 19, 2012) was an Iranian painter and teacher. He is a pioneer of modern Iranian painting.

== Early life and education ==
Ahmad Esfandiari was born on May 22, 1922, in Tehran. He father was Abdullah Adl Esfandiari, a Kerman statesmen during the Qajar and Pahlavi eras, and he was born into the Persian noble Esfandiari family whom originated from the Mazandaran province.

In childhood, he studied art under Ali Mohammad Heydarian. Esfandiari graduated in 1947 with a B.A. degree from the College of Fine Arts at the University of Tehran.

== Career ==
In the early 1950s, Esfandiari's artwork was influenced by Impressionism. By the late 1950s, he shifted his work towards rhythmic line work, and by the 1960s he started working primarily with blue and green colors.

His first showing of work was in a group exhibition at the Tehran Fine Arts Exhibition in 1946. In 1949, Esfandiari participated in the group exhibition of the Iran-France Cultural Association along with Hossein Kazemi, Mahmoud Javadipour, and Mehdi Vishkaei, and they collaborated in the founding of the first private gallery in Iran, the Apadana Gallery in Tehran. He participated in the first Tehran Biennial in 1955.

Esfandiari worked for many years for the Ministry of Education, teaching painting at a girls school until his retirement in 1975.

During the Iranian revolution, and the subsequent Iran–Iraq war years, he did not create many artworks. He continued painting afterwards, and up until his death. Esfandiari died at age 89 after an illness on March 19, 2012, in Tehran.
