= Ahmet Cevdet =

Ahmet Cevdet or Ahmed Cevdet is a masculine given name. Notable people with the name include:

- Ahmet Cevat Emre (1876–1961), Turkish journalist and linguist
- Ahmet Cevdet Oran (1862–1935), Turkish journalist
- Ahmed Cevdet Pasha (1822–1895), Ottoman statesman
