= Ahmet Uzun =

Northern Cypriot politician (born 1950)

Ahmet Uzun (born 1950 in Nicosia) was Minister of Finance in the Government of the Turkish Republic of Northern Cyprus, a non-recognized state. He was appointed to this portfolio in the TRNC Government from January 2004 to May 2009.
