= Öçal =

Öçal is a Turkish surname. Notable people with the surname include:

- Burhan Öçal (born 1959), Turkish musician
- Özgür Öçal (born 1981), Turkish footballer
- Yunus Öçal, Turkish volleyball coach
