= Ahmet Yıldız (scientist) =

American Turkish academic (born 1979)

Ahmet Yıldız (born 1979 in Sakarya, Turkey) is an American Turkish academic. He is currently a professor of physics and molecular cell biology at the University of California, Berkeley. He has contributed significantly to the understanding of transport within cells, in particular how motor proteins walk along filaments.

He received a B.S. in physics from Boğaziçi University, Istanbul, in 2001, followed by a Ph.D. from the University of Illinois at Urbana–Champaign in 2006. After postdoctoral work with Prof. Ron Vale at UCSF he joined the faculty of University of California, Berkeley in 2008.

In 2003 Yildiz received the Foresight Distinguished Student Award for his study of the motion of the molecular motor myosin V. According to the Foresight Institute: "The Distinguished Student Award recognizes the college graduate or undergraduate student whose work is deemed most notable in advancing the development and understanding of molecular nanotechnology." The award was presented during the Foresight Conference on Molecular Nanotechnology, October 10–12, 2003, in San Francisco. The Foresight Institute Distinguished Student Award was created in 1997, and is awarded annually.

Yildiz was awarded the 2005 GE & Science Prize for Young Life Scientists.

Yildiz currently teaches physics at University of California, Berkeley.
