= Ahmad Dukhqan =

Jordanian politician (1930–2015)

Ahmad Dukhqan (1930 – 18 April 2015) was a Jordanian politician and engineer of Circassian descent. He was Vice President of the Natural Resources Authority between 1981 and 1984 and undersecretary of the Ministry of Rural Affairs. Dukhqan served as Agriculture Minister between 1985 and 1986. Subsequently he was Transport Minister from 1986 until 1988 and Water Minister from 1988 to 1989.
