= Ahmet Öcal =

Belgian footballer

Personal information
- Full name: Ahmet Alper Öcal
- Date of birth: 17 December 1979 (age 46)
- Place of birth: Maaseik, Belgium
- Height: 1.79 m (5 ft 10 1/2 in)
- Position: Defender

Senior career*
Years	Team	Apps	(Gls)
1999–2003	Patro Eisden		
2003–2005	Diyarbakırspor	3	(0)
2005	Altay	1	(0)
2005–2008	KVSK United		
2008–2009	RFC Liège		
2009–2010	Patro Eisden		
- * Club domestic league appearances and goals

Ahmet Öcal (born 17 December 1979) is a Belgian footballer. In the past he played for K. Patro Eisden Maasmechelen (1999–2003), Diyarbakırspor (2003–2005), Altay S.K. (2005) and K.V.S.K. United Overpelt-Lommel (2005–2008), before signing for RFC Liège during the summer transfer window of 2008 after his new club had just been promoted to second division.

In October 2009, he returned to his first club, K. Patro Eisden Maasmechelen. He is the older brother of Abdülkerim Öcal. Together with his brothers, he now runs a grocery and kebab shop in Maasmechelen.
