= Ahmed Abukhater =

Palestinian American architect (born 1977)

Dr. Ahmed Abukhater
- د. أحمد أبو خاطر
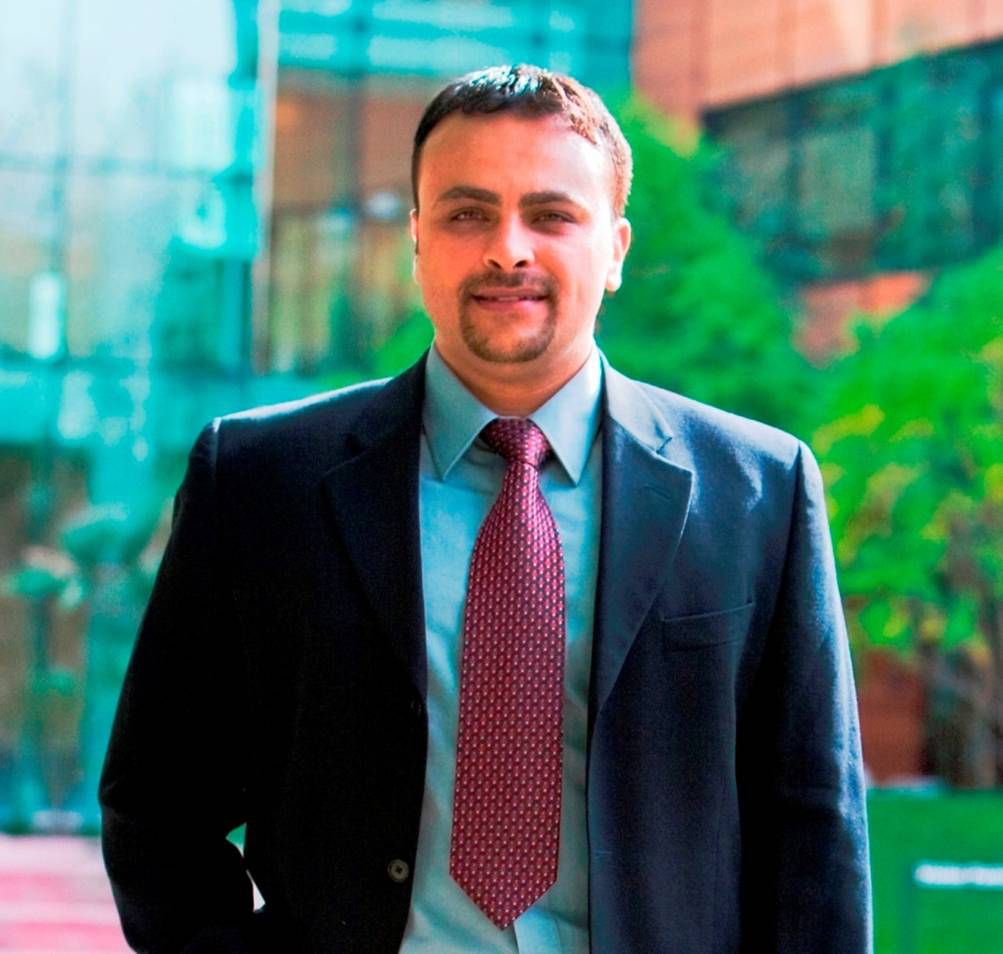
- Born: Rafah, Gaza Strip, Palestine
- Education: PhD in Community and Regional Planning, Dual Master's Degree, Urban and Regional Planning, and Bachelor of Engineering (Architectural Engineering); MIT, Harvard Kennedy School, University of Texas at Austin (PhD in Community and Regional Planning) University of Illinois at Urbana-Champaign (Urban and Regional Planning)
- Occupations: Architect, power lifter
- Employer: Boeing
- Known for: Author, speaker, and the first athlete to represent Palestine at the World Powerlifting Championships and world record for bench press
- Notable work: 1- Water as a Catalyst for Peace: Transboundary Water Management and Conflict Resolution [book], Taylor & Francis Group (Routledge). 2- Palestine – Peace by Piece: Transformative Conflict Resolution for Land and Trans-boundary Water Resources [book], Springer International Publishing.
- Height: 5 ft 9 in (1.75 m)
- Children: 4
- Website: ahmedabukhater.com

Competition record

Powerlifting – Bench Press

Representing United States|Palestinian

WABDL Heart of America Bench Press and Deadlift Championships
1st	2004	82kg (Illinois State Record)

World Powerlifting Championships
1st	2006	90kg
1st	2007	90kg
1st	2008	100kg
1st	2009	100kg

Ahmed Abukhater (Arabic: أحمد أبو خاطر) (born 1977) is an architect, environmental scientist, and an urban and regional planner by trade. He is an author, powerlifter, and the first athlete to represent Palestine at the World Association of Bench Pressers and Dead lifters (WABDL) World Powerlifting Championships in Las Vegas, Nevada, in 2006.

In November 2007, Abukhater represented Palestine again in the WABDL World Championship, in Anaheim, California, where he won his division and set a new Palestinian world record. He set a new record for the state of Illinois in 2004, and holds many national and international records in powerlifting.

== International and world records ==
Open and elite men's division −198 lbs weight class

Set in official drug-tested competition

- Squat: 630 lbs
- Bench Press: 610 lbs
- Deadlift: 705 lbs

== Personal records ==
Powerlifting Gym Records:

Done in the gym (unofficial)

- Squat: 705.4 lbs
- Bench Press: 727.5 lbs
- Deadlift: 749.5 lbs
- Powerlifting total: 2182 lbs

He also bench pressed 413.3 lbs for 10 repetitions, touch and go in the gym.

== Professional career ==
Abukhater is currently working for Boeing in Digital Aviation. Previously, he served as senior director of GIS at Trimble Navigation Ltd, global director of product management at Pitney Bowes Software, Esri’s global industry manager for planning and community development and director of PLACES in California and a GIS manager and instructor at the University of Texas at Austin.

He is keynote speaker in a number of areas including GIS solutions and strategic marketing in Planning and Community Development, Urban and Regional Planning, environmental science and sustainable development, and trans-boundary water resources management and Conflict Resolution. His expertise is focused on the geopolitical and hydropolitical aspects of water resources in the context of the Arab-Israeli conflict, the transboundary management of water resources, and multinational environmental policies in the Middle East.

== Early life ==
Born in the Palestinian city of Rafah, Ahmed Abukhater grew up in a world of environmental inequity. Being a native Palestinian from the Gaza Strip and raised during the Palestinian Intifada (uprising), he recognized the value of water as the sustainer of life and peace.

Abukhater holds a Ph.D. in community and regional planning from the University of Texas at Austin with a focus on water resources management and conflict resolution and mediation (alternative dispute resolution) and a master's degree in urban and regional planning from the University of Illinois at Urbana-Champaign and a bachelor's degree in architectural engineering.

== Specialization ==
Through education and professional experience, he developed specialization in fields ranging from Planning Analysis and Geographic Information System (Esri), Geospatial analysis and multi-criteria evaluation (MCE), groundwater modeling, Environmental Science and Sustainable Development, to Conflict Resolution and Mediation. Abukhater has authored numerous publications, served on governing and advisory boards, and received over 20 awards for his work. His recent book entitled Water as a Catalyst for Peace – Transboundary Water Management and Conflict Resolution is a book that describes a water negotiation framework and provides an exposé of how equity can be linked into the process of international treaty negotiation and governance.

== Publications ==
- Palestine – Peace by Piece: Transformative Conflict Resolution for Land and Trans-boundary Water Resources, Springer International Publishing.
- Water as a Catalyst for Peace: Transboundary Water Management and Conflict Resolution, Taylor & Francis Group (Routledge).
