= Ahmad Harb =

Palestinian novelist (1951–2025)

- أحمد حرب
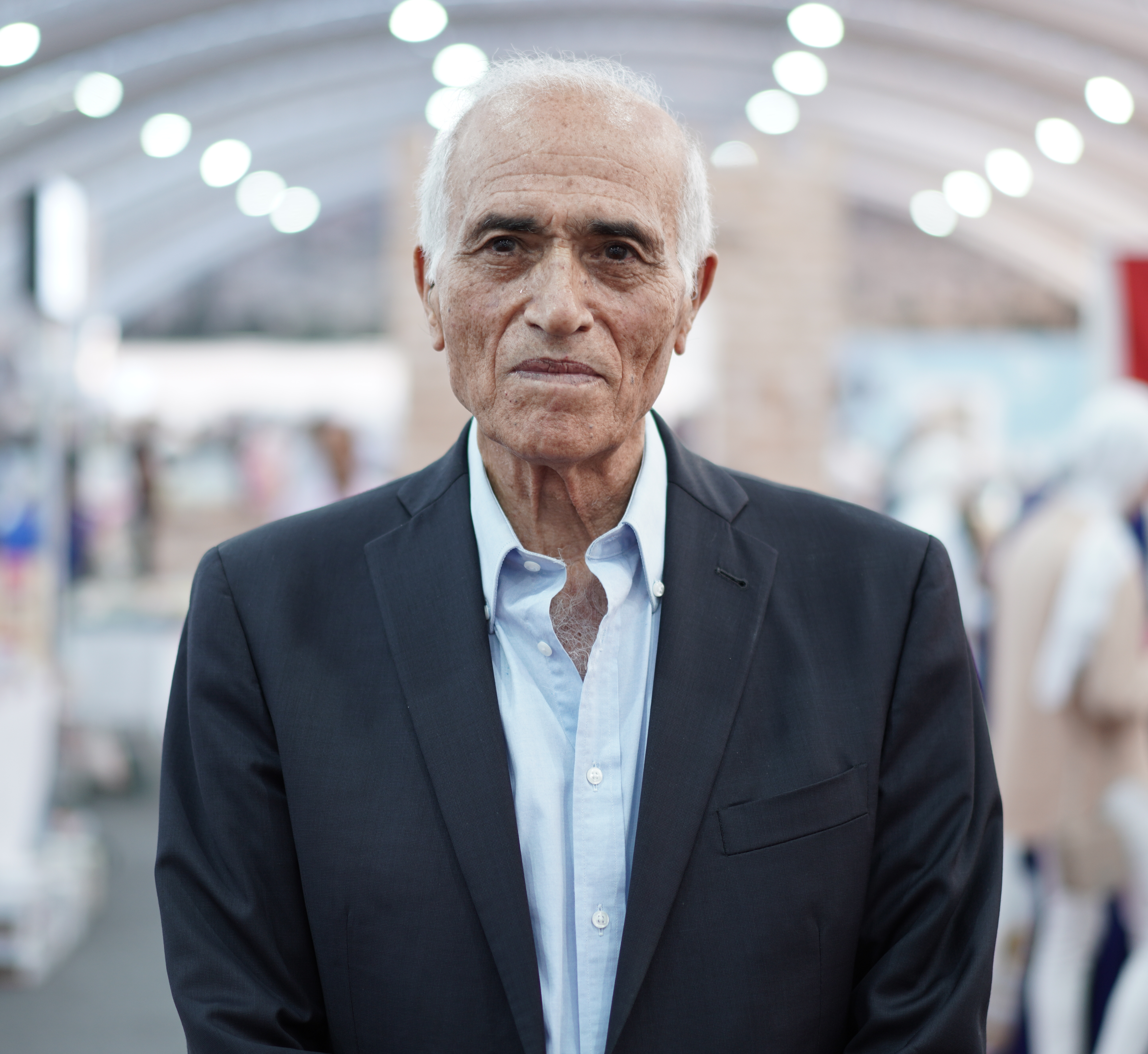
- Harb in 2023
- Born: 25 November 1951; Ad-Dhahiriya, Hebron Governorate, Palestine
- Died: 7 February 2025 (aged 73)
- Occupations: Writer and novelist

Ahmad Harb (Arabic: أحمد حرب, romanized: Aḥmad Ḥarb; 25 November 1951 – 7 February 2025) was a Palestinian writer and novelist. He was the chairman of the judging committee for the State of Palestine Awards in Literature, Arts and Humanities for the year 2019.

== Biography ==
Harb was born in Ad-Dhahiriya, Hebron Governorate, Palestine, on 25 November 1951. He was educated at University of Jordan, where he was awarded a Bachelor of English literature in 1974. He then obtained master's and PhD from University of Iowa. He worked at Birzeit University in 1987 and The Independent Commission for Human Rights in 2006.

== Works ==
He published more than 5 novels, including:

- Ḥikāyat ʻĀʼid (Arabic: حكاية عائد), 1981
- Ismāʻīl (Arabic: إسماعيل), 1987
- al-Jānib al-ākhar lʼrḍ al-maʻād (Arabic: الجانب الآخر لأرض المعاد), 1994
- Baqāyā (Arabic: بقايا), 1997
- al-Ṣuʻūd ilá al-miʼdhanah (Arabic: الصعود إلى المئذنة), 2008
- Mwāqd al-dhikrá (Arabic: مواقد الذكرى), 2023
