= Amadu =

Amadu can be a mononym, a given name, a middle name, or a surname. Notable people with the name include:

== Mononym ==
- Amadú (born 1996), Amade Momade Issufo, Mozambican footballer
- Amadu II of Masina (1845–1853), ruler of the nineteenth-century Massina Empire in what is now Mali
- Amadu III of Masina (1830–1862), the last ruler of the Fula Massina Empire in what is now the Mopti Region of Mali

== Given name ==
- Amadu Ali, Ghanaian politician
- Amadu Baldé (born 2005), Guinea-Bissauan football winger
- Amadu Diallo, 23-year-old US immigrant from Guinea shot and killed by four plain-clothed police officers
- Amadu Jalloh, politician in Sierra Leone
- Amadu Bansang Jobarteh (1915–2001), Gambian musician
- Amadu Seidu, Ghanaian parliamentarian
- Amadu Bukari Sorogho, Ghanaian parliamentarian
- Amadu Sulley (died 2025), Ghanaian public official
- Amadu Turé (born 1993), Guinea-Bissauan footballer
- Amadu Wurie (1898–1977), early Sierra Leonean educationist and politician
- Amadu Yusufu (born 1958), Malawian former cyclist

== Middle name ==
- John Amadu Bangura (1920–1970), the acting Governor-General of Sierra Leone from 18 April to 22 April 1968
- Alfred Amadu Conteh (born 1975), African American sculptor, painter and mixed-media artist
- Yulisa Pat Amadu Maddy (1936–2014), Sierra Leonean actor, dancer, director and playwright
- Tejan Amadu Mansaray, Sierra Leonean politician
- Mustapha Amadu Tanko, Ghanaian politician
- Moses Amadu Yahaya (born 1952), Ghanaian building technician, politician and Member of Parliament

== Surname ==
- Alhaji Salamu Amadu, Ghanaian businessman and philanthropist
- Issifu Omoro Tanko Amadu, Ghanaian judge
- Kabiru Amadu, Nigerian politician
- Latif Amadu (born 1993), Ghanaian professional footballer
- Mamood Amadu (born 1972), football player from Ghana
- Samuel Basintale Amadu, Ghanaian official
- Seku Amadu (1773–1845), founder of the Fula Massina Empire in what is now the Mopti Region of Mali
- Umaru Sanda Amadu, Ghanaian broadcast journalist

== See also ==
- Amadu's Jihad
- Amadou (name)
- Ahmadlu (disambiguation)
- Ahmadu (disambiguation)
- Amadeu
