= Amadou (name) =

Amadou is the Francophonic-orthography variant of the Islamic name Ahmad, commonly used in West Africa. Amadou is interchangeable with the forms Ahmadu or Amadu in non-Francophone African countries.

Notable people with the name include:

== Given name ==
- Amadou Aboubakar Zaki (born 1988), Nigerien basketball player
- Amadou Alassane (born 1983), French footballer
- Amadou Ali (1943–2022), Cameroonian politician
- Amadou Ali Djibo, Nigerien politician
- Amadou Ba (disambiguation), several people
- Amadou Bagayoko (1954–2025), half of Mali singing duo Amadou & Mariam
- Amadou Bakayoko (born 1996), Sierra Leonean-English professional footballer
- Amadou Bamba (1853–1927), Muslim Sufi religious leader in Senegal
- Amadou Cissé (born 1948), Nigerien politician
- Amadou Cissé Dia (1915–2002), Senegalese politician and playwright
- Amadou Cissé (footballer) (born 1985), French-Guinean footballer
- Amadou Cissé (footballer, born 2006), Guinean footballer
- Amadou Cheiffou (born 1942), Nigerien politician
- Amadou Coulibaly (born 1984), Burkinabé footballer
- Amadou Gon Coulibaly (1959–2020), Prime Minister of Ivory Coast
- Amadou Dia Ba (born 1958), Senegalese Olympic athlete
- Amadou Diallo (1975–1999), Guinean immigrant killed in a New York police shooting
- Amadou Diamouténé (born 1985), Malian footballer
- Amadou Diawara (born 1997), Guinean professional footballer
- Amadou Doucoure (1919–1971), Malian politician
- Amadou Gakou (born 1940), Senegalese Olympic sprinter
- Amadou Hampâté Bâ (1901–1991), Malian writer and ethnologist
- Amadou Jawo (born 1984), Swedish-Gambian footballer
- Amadou Karim Gaye (1913–2000), Senegalese veterinarian, physician and politician
- Amadou Konare, Malian coup leader
- Amadou Koné (born 1953), Burkinabé writer
- Amadou Konte (born 1981), Malian-French footballer
- Amadou Lamine Ba, Senegalese ambassador to the United States
- Amadou Ly, Senegalese-American actor
- Amadou Mahtar Ba, African media executive
- Amadou-Mahtar M'Bow (1921–2024), Senegalese educator
- Amadou Meïté (1949–2014), Ivorian sprinter
- Amadou Morou (born 1983), Togolese footballer
- Amadou Moutari (born 1994), Nigerien footballer
- Amadou Onana (born 2001), Belgian footballer
- Amadou Ouattara (born 1989), Ivorian footballer
- Amadou Rabihou (born 1984), Cameroonian footballer
- Amadou Salifou, Nigerien politician
- Amadou Samb (born 1988), Senegalese footballer
- Amadou Sanogo (born 1972), Malian military officer and coup leader
- Amadou Sanokho (born 1979), French footballer
- Amadou Sanyang (born 1991), Gambian footballer
- Amadou Sarr (born 2004), Italian footballer
- Amadou Scattred Janneh (born 1963), Gambian-American politician
- Amadou Séré (born 1987), Burkinabé footballer
- Amadou Sidibé (born 1986), Malian footballer
- Amadou Soukouna (born 1992), French footballer
- Amadou Tidiane Tall (born 1975), Burkinabé footballer
- Amadou Touré (born 1982), Burkinabé footballer
- Amadou Tidiane Tall (born 1975), Burkinabé footballer
- Amadou Toumani Touré (1948–2020), President of Mali from 2002 to 2012

== Surname ==
- Amiro Amadou (born 2002), Beninese footballer
- Anne-Lisa Amadou (1930–2002), Norwegian literary researcher
- Hama Amadou (1950–2024), Prime Minister of Niger from 1995 to 1996 and from 2000 to 2007
- Ibrahim Amadou (born 1993), Cameroonian footballer
- Kader Amadou (born 1989), Nigerien footballer
- Kadidjatou Amadou (born 1984), Nigerien disability rights activist, social entrepreneur and para-athlete
- Moudachirou Amadou (born 1971), Beninese footballer

== See also ==
- Amadou, a substance prepared from bracket fungi
