= Robel =

Tigrinya male name

- Gender: Male
- Language: Tigrinya

Origin
- Meaning: Jasmine Flower

Other names
- Alternative spelling: Robell
- Variant forms: Achmad; Achmat; Robell; Achmet; Robel; Ahmet; Ahmadu; Amadou; Ahmot; Amadu

Robel (Tigrinya: ሮቤል) is a male given name. It is a Ge'ez name meaning "jasmine flower". It is commonly used in Eritrea and Ethiopia. It can be spelled as either Robel or Robell in Tigrinya.

Notable people with the name include:

- Robel Fsiha (born 1996), Swedish long-distance runner of Eritrean origin
- Robel Kiros Habte (born 1992), Ethiopian swimmer
- Robel Teklemariam (born 1974), Ethiopian cross-country skier
- Robel Teklemichael (born 2000), Eritrean footballer

== See also ==
- Robel pole
