= 1971 Nobel Peace Prize =

Award

- Willy Brandt
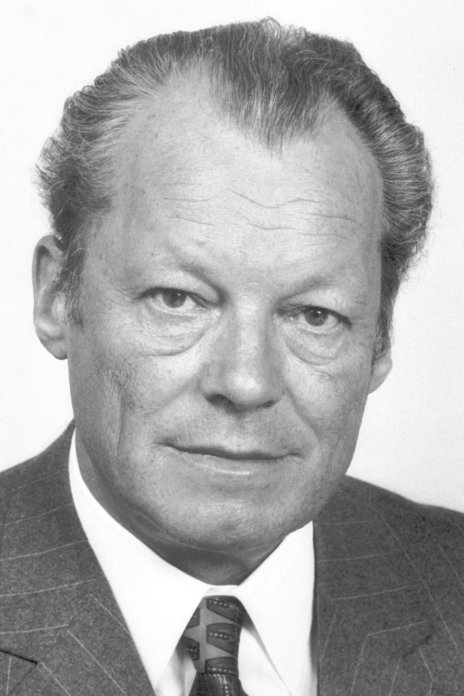
- "for paving the way for a meaningful dialogue between East and West."
- Date: 20 October 1971 (announcement); 10 December 1971 (ceremony)
- Location: Oslo, Norway
- Presented by: Norwegian Nobel Committee
- First award: 1901
- Website: Official website

The 1971 Nobel Peace Prize was awarded to the Chancellor of Germany Willy Brandt (1913–1992) "for paving the way for a meaningful dialogue between East and West." Because of his efforts to strengthen cooperation in western Europe through the European Economic Community (EEC) and to achieve reconciliation between West Germany and the countries of Eastern Europe, he became the fourth German recipient of the prestigious Peace Prize.

== Laureate ==
Willy Brandt was active in German politics since his youth. He was engaged in clandestine resistance against the Nazis and went into exile in Norway in 1933. There he joined the Labour Party where he campaigned for a Nobel Peace Prize to Carl von Ossietzky. When the German occupation of Norway took place in 1940, he fled to Sweden where he worked as a journalist documenting the brutality of World War II. After the war, Brandt returned to Germany and continued engaging in politics becoming Mayor of West Berlin in 1957, Minister for Foreign Affairs in 1966, Leader of the Social Democratic Party in 1964 and Chancellor of Germany in 1969. As federal Chancellor, he made decisive efforts for West Germany to sign the Treaty on the Non-Proliferation of Nuclear Weapons (NPT), established a peaceful agreement – the Treaty of Moscow – with the Soviet Union in 1970, and another agreement – the Treaty of Warsaw with Poland in the same year which entailed that West Germany accepted the new national boundaries in Eastern Europe that had become effective in 1945. These treaties laid the foundations for the Four Power Agreement on Berlin which made it easier for families from either side of the divided city to visit each other. He resigned as Chancellor in May 1974.

== Deliberations ==
=== Nominations ===
Brandt had not been nominated before for the peace prize, making him one of the laureates who won on a rare occasion when they have been awarded the Nobel Peace Prize the same year they were first nominated. Brandt only received three separate nominations: one from Jens Otto Krag (1914–1978) of Denmark, another from Wolfgang Yourgrau (1908–1979) the United States and a joint nomination by three politicians (La Pira of Italy, De Chambrun of France, and Dia of Senegal).

In total, the Norwegian Nobel Committee received 86 nominations for 33 individuals and 7 organizations including Vinoba Bhave, Hélder Câmara, Cyrus S. Eaton, Alfonso García Robles (awarded in 1982), Clarence Streit, Elie Wiesel (awarded in 1986) and the Universal Esperanto Association (UEA). Eighteen individuals and two organizations were nominated for the first time such as Cesar Chavez, Tage Erlander, Einar Gerhardsen, Jean Monnet, Arvid Pardo, Stefan Wyszyński, Herbert York and the Centre for Cultural and Social Cooperation in France. French activist Louise Weiss, also a first-time recommended, was the only woman nominated that year. Notable figures like Jacobo Árbenz, Nora Stanton Barney, Carlo Braga, Louis Lecoin, Reinhold Niebuhr, Hiratsuka Raichō, Miriam Soljak, William Griffith Wilson and Waldo Williams died in 1971 without having been nominated for the peace prize.

Official list of nominees and their nominators for the prize
No.	Nominee	Country/ Headquarters	Motivations	Nominator(s)
Individuals
1	Francisco Arasa Bernaus (?–1997)	Spain	"for his initiatives and work to create better understanding among men, which are of extraordinary importance for peace in our time."	Josep Maria Pi i Sunyer (1889–1984)
2	Vinoba Bhave (1895–1982)	India	"for his lifelong commitment to peace and social reform."	Kåre Kristiansen (1920–2005); Lars Roar Langslet (1936–2016)
3	Eugene Carson Blake (1906–1985)	United States	"for being a leader in the ecumenical movement, civil and human rights, and world peace."	Michael E. Parrish (b. 1944)
4	Charles K. Bliss (1897–1985)	Soviet Union (Ukraine); Austria	No motivation included.	Doug Everingham (1923–2017) (Note: Everingham jointly nominated G. B. Chisholm and C. K. Bliss.)
5	Carl Bonnevie (1881–1972)	Norway	"for his tireless work for the cause of peace."	Gunnar Skaug (1940–2006)
6	Willy Brandt (1913–1992)	Germany	"for his part in bringing about accords that have been among the most important events in the post-war period in favor of international détente and peace, and for his conduct which was both a great symbol of humility and remorse for the past and a great promise for the future."	Giorgio La Pira (1904–1977); Charles de Chambrun (1930–2010); Amadou Cissé Dia (1915–2002)
6	Willy Brandt (1913–1992)	Germany	"for working incessantly on the achievement of a just peace wherein he has shown unparalleled initiative in accomplishing his aims and has undertaken this task with great personal risk for his career."	Wolfgang Yourgrau (1908–1979)
6	Willy Brandt (1913–1992)	Germany	"in recognition of his consistent politics of peace as an important initiative to secure the world peace that has existed for the last decade, and for his political endeavors to minimize political tension in Europe which are worthy of respect and admiration."	Jens Otto Krag (1914–1978)
7	Hélder Câmara (1909–1999)	Brazil	"for being the leading advocate for non-violent social change in Latin-America."	Walter Ralston Martin (1928–1989)
7	Hélder Câmara (1909–1999)	Brazil	"for his fight for the rights of the impoverished and oppressed, and for being a symbol of peace through his life, thoughts, speeches, and acts that are deeply founded in justice, freedom and equality."	Dietrich Rollmann (1932–2008)
7	Hélder Câmara (1909–1999)	Brazil	No motivation included.	Martin Bullinger (1930–2021)
7	Hélder Câmara (1909–1999)	Brazil	No motivation included.	Marie Lous Mohr (1892–1973)
7	Hélder Câmara (1909–1999)	Brazil	"for his unique role in one of the poorest areas of Latin-America as a leader of the progressive minority of the Catholic Church, as well as being the leading spokesman for non-violent methods to further social change and having played an important international role by contributing to a greater understanding in industrialized countries of the social reality in one of the poorest areas in the world."	members of the Swedish Parliament
7	Hélder Câmara (1909–1999)	Brazil	"for his efforts to bring about a social revolution in South America through friendly co-operation and non-violent means, contributing greatly to the cause of world peace."	Bruno Kreisky (1911–1990)
7	Hélder Câmara (1909–1999)	Brazil	"for his work to achieve a more humane existence for millions of people, his publications, lectures, and speeches in favor of peace and justice and his striving for co-operation of all nations, religions and systems towards peace."	8 members of the Dutch Parliament
7	Hélder Câmara (1909–1999)	Brazil	"for his significant contribution to promoting the humanization of conflicts and disputes and his effort to break the spiral of violence that arises when the violence of the rulers and the violence of the oppressed coincide."	Josef Müller (1898–1979)
7	Hélder Câmara (1909–1999)	Brazil	"for his tireless efforts to create a more peaceful and humane world and break the spiral of violence that arises when the violence of the rulers and the violence of the oppressed coincide."	Albert Burger (1925–1981)
8	Sanjib Chaudhuri (?)	India	"for his for his works which will live through ages and help humanity in attaining its goal of one government for the world."	Lalita Rajya Laxmi (1917–?)
9	Cesar Chavez (1927–1993)	United States	"for the quality of leadership he has shown in the long struggle of farmworkers for human dignity, and, through his persevering efforts, seeks to combat poverty and injustice and build a new quality of relationship between men."	Bronson P. Clark (1918–2004)
10	Jean Chazal (1907–1991)	France	No motivation included.	15 members of the Venezuelan National Assembly
10	Jean Chazal (1907–1991)	France	No motivation included.	Pierre Bouzat (1906–2002)
11	Brock Chisholm (1896–1971)	Canada	No motivation included.	Doug Everingham (1923–2017)
12	John Collins (1910–1988)	United Kingdom	"for his devotion and altruistic work towards the cause of peace, and undertaking great humanitarian efforts through organizations like the Christian Action and the International Defence and Aid Fund, which he created."	12 members of the Swedish Parliament
12	John Collins (1910–1988)	United Kingdom	"for his vigorous pursuit of policies of international understanding and support for the under-privileged over many years and in many countries."	Oliver Tomkins (1908–1992)
12	John Collins (1910–1988)	United Kingdom	"for his work in the post-war years for Save Europe Now, his work for the victims of oppression in South Africa, his work as chairman of the Campaign for Nuclear Disarmament in Great Britain and his work for reconciliation with the Eastern Bloc."	19 members of the British Parliament
12	John Collins (1910–1988)	United Kingdom	No motivation included.	Learie Constantine (1901–1971)
12	John Collins (1910–1988)	United Kingdom	"for his long and intensive labors in the interest of racial harmony throughout the world."	3 professors of law from the University of Sydney
12	John Collins (1910–1988)	United Kingdom	"for his struggle against racism, which is perhaps the greatest threat to the peace and happiness of the human race and working tirelessly to heal the wounds of war and reduce the risks of its recurrence."	Gough Whitlam (1916–2014)
12	John Collins (1910–1988)	United Kingdom	"for being a most courageous and active fighter for peace, especially in connection with the pressure for nuclear disarmament, and particularly for his attempt to contribute to the agitation for change in the racial policies of the Union of South Africa."	Otto Kahn-Freund (1900–1979)
12	John Collins (1910–1988)	United Kingdom	"for his selfless efforts to the cause of peace and mutual understanding among men regardless of color, religion or creed, and for continuously devoting himself to bridging gaps, fostering racial accommodation for the benefit of mankind as a whole."	Kenneth Kaunda (1924–2021)
12	John Collins (1910–1988)	United Kingdom	No motivation included.	Svend Haugaard (1913–2003)
12	John Collins (1910–1988)	United Kingdom	"for his contributions as leader of the Campaign for Nuclear Disarmament, as leader of the Treason Trial Fund for South Africa, and later the International Defence and Aid Fund."	Sven Skovmand (b. 1936)
12	John Collins (1910–1988)	United Kingdom	"for his many years of devotion to the cause of international peace and understanding."	Whetu Tirikatene-Sullivan (1932–2011)
13	Randolph Parker Compton (1892–1987)	United States	"for his impressive work for peace."	Cyril Edwin Black (1915–1989)
14	Cyrus S. Eaton (1883–1979)	Canada; United States	"for contributing to fostering understanding and friendship among all nations of the world and for hiss efforts to improve the political relations and economic cooperation between East and West, an encouragement to other business leaders in the United States to use their influence on behalf of world peace."	Jennings Randolph (1902–1998)
15	Tage Erlander (1901–1985)	Sweden	"[with Gerhardsen] for contributing to co-operative policy in the Nordic countries and further understanding and tolerance across borders."	Guttorm Hansen (1920–2009); 3 members of the Swedish Parliament
16	Buckminster Fuller (1895–1983)	United States	"for his seminal vision of a world community in which architecture among other arts can create common positive goals to bring people together."	Adam Yarmolinsky (1922–2000)
16	Buckminster Fuller (1895–1983)	United States	"for being one of those rare individuals who takes a total view of the world, unhampered by national, linguistic, racial, or other such barriers."	Karan Singh (b. 1931)
17	Alfonso García Robles (1911–1991)	Mexico	"for his merits and contribution to the creation of treaties against nuclear-arms in Latin-America, which he contributed greatly to through his intelligence, perseverance, and love for peace."	Jorge Castañeda y Álvarez de la Rosa (1921–1997)
17	Alfonso García Robles (1911–1991)	Mexico	"because he took a decisive part in the adoption of the Treaty of Tlatelolco signed in Mexico City on April 12, 1967, establishing a denuclearization regime for Latin America."	René-Jean Dupuy (1918–1997)
17	Alfonso García Robles (1911–1991)	Mexico	"for his support of disarmament in Latin-America and almost making it a non-nuclear zone, and also for being a moving force in securing the adoption of the Disarmament Resolutions by the United Nations General Assembly, which set forth a programme for general and complete disarmament."	Philip Noel-Baker (1889–1982)
18	Einar Gerhardsen (1897–1987)	Norway	"[with Erlander] for contributing to co-operative policy in the Nordic countries and further understanding and tolerance across borders."	Guttorm Hansen (1920–2009); 3 members of the Swedish Parliament
19	Marc Joux (?)	France	"for his work to create a climate for thought and action, a public movement, in favor of enhancing human conditions and a grander peace."	Auguste Billiemaz (1903–1983)
20	Spurgeon Milton Keeny (1893–1988)	United States	"for his dedication and concern for the welfare of humanity, devotedly working towards bettering the state of life for peoples in the world and contributed greatly to the fight against diseases and later population control in Asia."	Amadeo Cruz (1903–1988)
20	Spurgeon Milton Keeny (1893–1988)	United States	"for his work with organizations and nations in the field of population control in underdeveloped countries in Asia, and through his commitment and dedication to human welfare and fraternity, he has done a great service to the cause of peace."	Hak Yul Kim (?)
20	Spurgeon Milton Keeny (1893–1988)	United States	"for his efforts to tame population growth using experience derived from his involvement in the fight against diseases and critical problems that threaten mankind, and working to ease tensions and remedy situations which unchecked could lead to war."	Chester Jarvis (1921–2009)
21	Jean Monnet (1888–1979)	France	"for his utmost important contribution to securing long lasting peace."	members of the governments and parliaments (Note: Members of the governments and parliaments of Germany, France, the United Kingdom, Netherlands, Italy, Belgium and Luxembourg.)
22	Arvid Pardo (1914–1999)	Malta; Sweden	"for his exceptional initiative and outstanding contribution in promoting the peaceful uses of the ocean bed for the benefit of all mankind."	Ritchie Calder (1906–1982)
23	Kathiresu Ramachandra (1895–1976)	Sri Lanka	"for faithfully serving the cause of world peace."	Cyrillus Xavier Martyn (1908–?)
24	Michail Stasinopoulos (1903–2002)	Greece	"for his courage to uphold the law over directives from the Colonels to remove a judge."	René Cassin (1887–1976)
25	Lyudmil Stoyanov (1886–1973)	Bulgaria	"for being an outstanding peace partisan, anti-fascist, and humanist, and an outstanding fighter for peace, social progress and the welfare of all people."	Sava Ganovski (1897–1993)
26	Clarence Streit (1896–1986)	United States	"for his dedicated work toward an Atlantic union of free nations."	Jim Wright (1922–2015)
27	Cláudio Villas-Bôas (1916–1998)	Brazil	"in recognition of their lifelong struggle to save the Indians in Amazonia, and their unique achievements in approaching and pacifying primitive tribes and protecting them in Brazil's first national park."	Alan Lennox-Boyd (1904–1983)
28	Orlando Villas-Bôas (1914–2002)	Brazil	"in recognition of their lifelong struggle to save the Indians in Amazonia, and their unique achievements in approaching and pacifying primitive tribes and protecting them in Brazil's first national park."	2 professors from the University of Paris
29	Richard von Coudenhove-Kalergi (1894–1972)	Austria; Japan	No motivation included.	Tadao Kuraishi (1900–1986)
29	Richard von Coudenhove-Kalergi (1894–1972)	Austria; Japan	No motivation included.	2 members of the Japanese Parliament
29	Richard von Coudenhove-Kalergi (1894–1972)	Austria; Japan	"for his great academic achievement, his advocacy for peace and his intelligent, positive, and courageous activism."	Yōzō Horigome (1913–1975)
30	Louise Weiss (1893–1983)	France	No motivation included.	Alain Poher (1909–1996); Achille Peretti (1911–1983); Émile Roche (1893–1990)
31	Elie Wiesel (1928–2016)	Romania; United States	"for being a prominent author, transcendent humanist, and intrepid peace-worker."	Amiya Chakravarty (1901–1986)
31	Elie Wiesel (1928–2016)	Romania; United States	"for, in terms of his own personal experience of horrors and his subsequent efforts for peace, having become a symbol of hope and an inspiration to peoples throughout the world."	Fred R. Harris (b. 1930)
31	Elie Wiesel (1928–2016)	Romania; United States	"for having offered a moral perspective on the Holocaust which bears broad implications about human nature, civilization, and moral value, and throughout his novels and essays, his travels and lectures, he has been a ceaseless advocate of peace."	Alan Cranston (1914–2000)
31	Elie Wiesel (1928–2016)	Romania; United States	"for throughout his novels and essays, his travels and lectures being a ceaseless advocate of peace and for his works of great importance, especially since a generation has passed since the end of the Second World War."	Hubert Humphrey (1911–1978)
31	Elie Wiesel (1928–2016)	Romania; United States	"for his work against hate, and his faith in mankind and the final victory of the forces of progress and peace."	André Monteil (1915–1998)
31	Elie Wiesel (1928–2016)	Romania; United States	"for showing a wisdom born of incredible suffering and a burning desire in his writing to bring the inexorable lessons of the Holocaust home to mankind."	Jacob Javits (1904–1986)
31	Elie Wiesel (1928–2016)	Romania; United States	No motivation included.	Emil Fackenheim (1916–2003)
32	Stefan Wyszyński (1901–1981)	Poland	"for his efforts to mediate disputes and prevent violence which could have had tragic consequences for social order and peace."	Stanley Haidasz (1923–2009)
33	Herbert York (1921–2009)	United States	"for his efforts to de-escalate the arms race and keep political decisions in the hands of representatives of the people and away from machines and military men, and being a civilizing influence on the government of his country."	Michael E. Parrish (b. 1944)
Organizations
34	Centre for Cultural and Social Cooperation	Paris	"for their worldwide and important work to promote tolerance and mutual understanding between peoples without regard to nationality, class, race, religion, or political affiliation."	Carl E. Wang (1930–2016)
35	International Union for Child Welfare (IUCW) (founded in 1946)	Geneva	"for its vital role in giving the young an education and upbringing free from racial, national, and social prejudices, and their pioneering work in framing and adopting the U.N. Charter of Children's Rights, thus contributing to a world of unity and peace."	Sadashiv Kanoji Patil (1898–1981); Ram Subhag Singh (1917–1980)
35	International Union for Child Welfare (IUCW) (founded in 1946)	Geneva	"for its world-wide humanitarian work for the young, especially in developing countries which have derived enormous benefit from its dedication and expertise."	Indira Gandhi (1917–1984)
35	International Union for Child Welfare (IUCW) (founded in 1946)	Geneva	"for the considerable work it has done for children in need all over the world and its efforts to further peace and understanding."	Gunnar Garbo (1924–2016)
36	International Union for Land Value Taxation and Free Trade (The IU) (founded in 1926)	London	No motivation included	Alfred Henningsen (1918–2012)
36	International Union for Land Value Taxation and Free Trade (The IU) (founded in 1926)	London	"for its efforts to further international understanding and contribute to peace by removing the underlying causes of poverty and war."	Kåre Kristiansen (1920–2005)
37	Islands of Peace (founded in 1958)	Huy	"for its work for development in India."	Raymond Vander Elst (1914–2008)
38	Jugend "Youths" in Bayreuth	Bayreuth	"for their decade long work to better the understanding between peoples."	Christoph Schiller (1927–1994)
39	Pugwash Conferences on Science and World Affairs (founded in 1957)	Rome	No motivation included.	Johan Galtung (b. 1930)
40	Universal Esperanto Association (UEA) (founded in 1908)	Rotterdam	"for its efforts to further international understanding and solve the language problem of the world."	5 members of the Norwegian Parliament
40	Universal Esperanto Association (UEA) (founded in 1908)	Rotterdam	"for its contribution to understanding between peoples and world peace."	50 members of the French National Assembly
40	Universal Esperanto Association (UEA) (founded in 1908)	Rotterdam	"for its admirable work for international understanding, solidarity between peoples and world peace."	6 members of the French Senate
40	Universal Esperanto Association (UEA) (founded in 1908)	Rotterdam	No motivation included.	131 members of the Swedish Parliament
40	Universal Esperanto Association (UEA) (founded in 1908)	Rotterdam	No motivation included.	14 members of the Danish Parliament
40	Universal Esperanto Association (UEA) (founded in 1908)	Rotterdam	"for its work for international understanding and world peace."	40 members of the Dutch Parliament
40	Universal Esperanto Association (UEA) (founded in 1908)	Rotterdam	"for its humanitarian activities and continuous work for the achievement of cordial relations between peoples and the promotion of world peace."	3 members of the Italian Parliament
40	Universal Esperanto Association (UEA) (founded in 1908)	Rotterdam	"for its humanitarian activities and continuous work for the achievement of cordial relations between peoples and the promotion of world peace."	Jozef Rosa (1916–1973)
40	Universal Esperanto Association (UEA) (founded in 1908)	Rotterdam	"for its humanitarian activities and continuous work for the achievement of cordial relations between peoples and the promotion of world peace."	Cornelius Gallagher (1921–2018)
40	Universal Esperanto Association (UEA) (founded in 1908)	Rotterdam	"for its admirable activity in favor of international understanding and world peace."	Demitrius G. Nianias (?)
40	Universal Esperanto Association (UEA) (founded in 1908)	Rotterdam	"for its admirable activity in favor of international understanding and world peace."	Lona Murowatz (1919–2016)
40	Universal Esperanto Association (UEA) (founded in 1908)	Rotterdam	No motivation included.	Robert Cant (1915–1997)

== Norwegian Nobel Committee ==
The following members of the Norwegian Nobel Committee appointed by the Storting were responsible for the selection of the 1971 Nobel laureate in accordance with the will of Alfred Nobel:

1971 Norwegian Nobel Committee
Picture	Name	Position	Political Party	Other posts
	Aase Lionæs (1907–1999)	Chairwoman	Labour	Vice President of the Lagting (1965–1973)
	Bernt Ingvaldsen (1902–1982)	Member	Conservative	President of the Storting (1965–1972)
	Helge Refsum (1897–1976)	Member	Centre	former Judge at the Gulating Court (1922–1949)
	Helge Rognlien (1920–2001)	Member	Liberal	Minister of Local Government (1970–1971)
	John Sanness (1913–1984)	Member	Labour	Director of the Norwegian Institute of International Affairs (1960–1983)
