= Amadou Cissé =

Amadou Cissé may refer to:

- Amadou Cissé (politician) (born 1948), Prime Minister of Niger
- Amadou Cissé (Mauritanian footballer) (died 2017), Mauritanian football manager and former player
- Amadou Cissé (footballer, born 1985), Guinean footballer midfielder
- Amadou Cissé (footballer, born 2006), Guinean football centre-back for Strasbourg
- Amadou Cissé Dia (1915-2002), Senegalese playwright

== See also ==
- Amadou Ciss (born 1999), Senegalese football midfielder
