= Doucouré =

Doucouré or Doucoure is a surname. Notable people with the surname include:

- Abdoulaye Doucouré (born 1993), French footballer
- Amadou Doucoure (1919–1971), Malian politician
- Aminata Doucouré (born 1994), French-Malian footballer
- Boubacari Doucouré (born 1999), French footballer
- Cheick Doucouré (born 2000), Malian footballer
- Ladji Doucouré (born 1983), French track and field athlete
- Lassana Doucouré (born 1988), French footballer
- Maïmouna Doucouré (born 1985), French film director and screenwriter
- Mahamadou Doucouré (born 2000), French footballer
- Mamadou Doucouré (born 1998), French-Senegalese footballer
- Mintou Doucoure (born 1982), Malian footballer
- Sadio Doucouré (born 1992), French-Malian basketball player
- Siriné Doucouré (born 2002), French footballer
