= Tinni =

Tinni may refer to:

- Srabosti Dutta Tinni (active 2004–2013), Bangladeshi actress and model
- Ousseini Tinni (born 1954), Nigerien politician

== See also ==
- Tonni (name)
