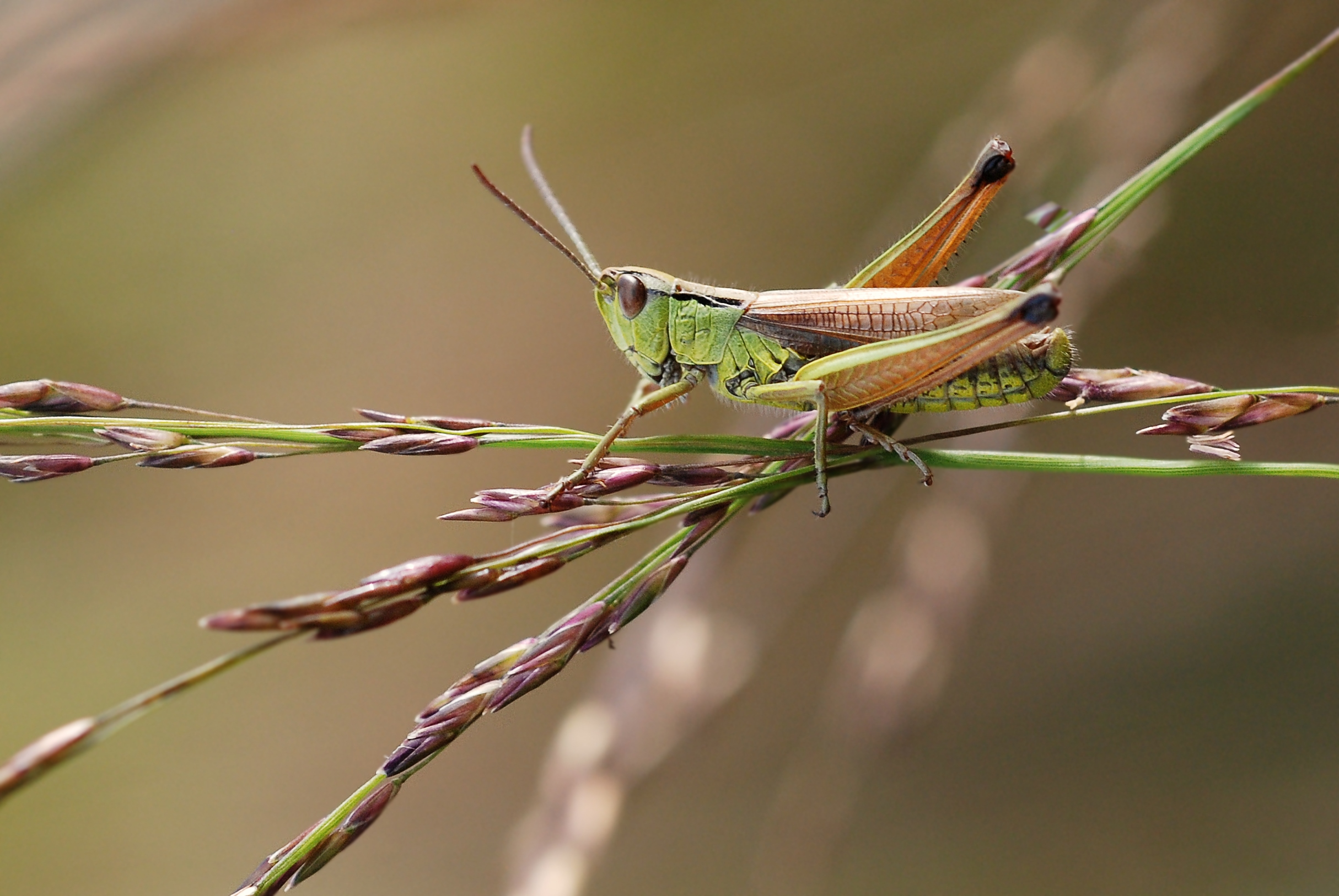
- Male Chorthippus montanus

Conservation status
- Least Concern (IUCN 3.1) (Europe regional assessment)

Scientific classification
- Kingdom: Animalia
- Phylum: Arthropoda
- Clade: Pancrustacea
- Class: Insecta
- Order: Orthoptera
- Suborder: Caelifera
- Family: Acrididae
- Genus: Pseudochorthippus
- Species: P. montanus

Binomial name
- Pseudochorthippus montanus (Charpentier, 1825)

Synonyms
- Chorthippus montanus (Charpentier, 1825)

Audio
- Song

= Pseudochorthippus montanus =

Species of grasshopper

The water-meadow grasshopper (Pseudochorthippus montanus also often known by its synonym Chorthippus montanus) is a species of short-horned grasshopper in the family Acrididae, tribe Gomphocerini. It closely resembles the meadow grasshopper (Pseudochorthippus parallelus), and historically, both were classified under the name Chorthippus longicornis. Occasional hybridization occurs between the two species in the wild. It is found across the Palearctic. In Europe, the northern distribution border passes through northern France, the Benelux countries and northern Scandinavia. The south boundary is the Pyrenees and French Central Massif, the south edge of the central Alps, the Apennines to the northern part of the Balkan Peninsula and from Romania to Mongolia and Manchuria. The species is widespread in Central and Eastern Europe, even at low altitudes. It occurs in the Alps 370–2480 meters above sea level on. In Asia, the range extends to Siberia extends north to Verkhoyansk, the Altai and Kamchatka.

Close-up of a Pseudochorthippus montanus

== Description ==
The water-meadow grasshopper measure 12.9–16.0 mm (males) or 17.0–22.0 mm (females) in body length. Their coloration, like that of most slant-faced grasshoppers, varies, with common forms including green morphs with brown backs or entirely green bodies.

Both the bog and common grasshoppers are distinguished from other Chorthippus species by their dark knees, shortened wings, and slightly curved pronotal keels. Differentiating the two species is challenging.

The Pseudochorthippus montanus has a slightly sturdier build, with a wing spot located at least 2.5 mm from the wing tip, resulting in more transparent forewings. In males, the hindwings (alae) extend just short of or to the wing spot, while the forewings (tegmina) reach at least the mid-thigh, longer than in the common bush-cricket. Forewing lengths are 9–11.8 mm (males) or 14.5–18 mm (macropterous males), and 8.7–12 mm or 14–18 mm (females). The alae, when folded, are always shorter than the elytra, measuring 5–7 mm (males) or 5–6 mm (females). The pronotum measures 2.6–3.4 mm (males) or 3.3–4.3 mm (females). The stridulation averages 137–139 pegs, compared to about 94 in the common bush-cricket.

Females are distinguished by longer ovipositor valves and broader, more rounded wing tips. Both species exhibit long-winged, fully flight-capable forms in both sexes.

== Distribution and habitat ==
The water-meadow grasshopper ranges from Western Europe to the Kamchatka Peninsula in Asia. Its northern boundary in Europe spans northern France, the Benelux countries, and northern Scandinavia, reaching up to 68°N in Finland. The southern boundary extends from the Pyrenees through the French Massif Central, the southern Central Alps, the Apennines, northern Balkans, Romania, Mongolia, and Manchuria. It is widespread in Central and Eastern Europe, even at lower elevations. In the Alps, it occurs between 370 and 2,480 meters, preferring colline and montane zones. In Asia, its range stretches from southern Siberia to Verkhoyansk, the Altai Mountains, and Kamchatka.

This species thrives in wet to moist habitats with low to medium-height vegetation, such as wet meadows, lake and river margins, and high and low moors. It avoids tall vegetation like wet fallows, sedge beds, or reedbeds. It often coexists with the long-winged conehead (Conocephalus fuscus), large marsh grasshopper (Stethophyma grossum), and steppe grasshopper (Chorthippus dorsatus). In adjacent drier habitats, it may overlap with the common bush-cricket, with which it occasionally hybridizes.

== Behavior and ecology ==
The water-meadow grasshopper behavior mirrors that of the common bush-cricket. It feeds on plants such as purple moor-grass (Molinia caerulea), common reed (Phragmites australis), black bog-rush (Schoenus nigricans), and various sedges. In laboratory settings, it prefers grasses over sedges like Carex.

Adults are observed from June to November, occasionally as early as late May, appearing about a month later than the common bush-cricket. In Central Europe, it is among the latest-emerging short-horned grasshoppers, with peak adult populations in early September.

=== Mating ===
The Pseudochorthippus montanus song is slower, coarser, and louder than that of the common bush-cricket but otherwise similar. At cooler temperatures, the song slows, complicating species identification. The song consists of 2–4.5-second "shr-shr-shr" phrases, followed by 4–7-second pauses, with each verse containing 12–22 syllables. Rival males sing more slowly. Females rarely respond to males but can sing nearly as loudly.

Unreceptive females avoid singing males and repel mating attempts with hindleg kicks. Receptive females approach males, respond vocally, or are found by chance. Males are mating-ready 4–12 days after molting to adulthood and can mate multiple times daily, producing spermatophores quickly. Mating lasts about 26 minutes.

=== Development ===
Females lay 6–7 egg pods, each containing about 7 eggs, fewer than related Chorthippus species. The eggs are sensitive to drought, and insufficient moisture during embryonic development reduces nymph size and increases mortality. Eggs are laid in soil or sedge root mats without the scraping motions seen in the common bush-cricket. Development to hatching is slow due to the cool, wet habitats, but nymphs develop relatively quickly through five stages.

== Conservation ==
In Germany, the Pseudochorthippus montanus is on the early warning list of the ICUN Red List of Threatened Species . In Switzerland, it is classified as "vulnerable" (VU), and in Austria, it is listed as "near threatened" (NT). Habitat loss from river straightening, drainage, groundwater lowering, and agricultural conversion of wetlands is the primary threat. Afforestation and abandonment of wet meadows and low moors further endanger populations, increasing isolation risks.

Conservation requires preserving wet meadows, marshes, and moors, restoring natural groundwater levels in river valleys, and managing habitats through one or two annual mowings or extensive grazing.

== Systematics and taxonomy ==
The species was first described in 1825 by Charpentier in his work Horae entomologicae adjectis tabulis novem coloratis as "Gryllus montanus." As was customary at the time, he did not designate a holotype. A neotype was later established from a specimen in the Entomological Museum of the Zoological Institute at Lund University. The type locality is Saxony and Silesia. Due to its strong resemblance to the common grasshopper (Chorthippus parallelus), the species was previously classified as Chorthippus longicornis. Its species status was frequently questioned in the 19th century until Faber (1929) conducted a detailed morphological study, particularly of their songs, distinguishing Chorthippus parallelus and Chorthippus montanus. The epithet refers to its occurrence in higher elevations, though this applies primarily in the southern part of its range.

== Literature ==
- Baur, Bertrand; Baur, Hannes; Roesti, Christian; Roesti, Daniel (2006). Die Heuschrecken der Schweiz. Haupt Verlag. ISBN 3-258-07053-9.
- Heiko, Bellmann (2006). Die Arten Mitteleuropas sicher bestimmen. Franckh-Kosmos. ISBN 3-440-10447-8.
- Detzel, Peter (1998). Die Heuschrecken Baden-Württembergs. Eugen Ulmer. ISBN 3-800-13507-8.
