= AllAfrica =

African-sourced online news aggregator

- Website type: News website
- Owner: AllAfrica Global Media
- Website: allafrica.com

AllAfrica (styled as allAfrica) is a website that aggregates and produces news primarily on the African continent about all areas of African life, politics, issues and culture. It is owned by AllAfrica Global Media, a multi-media content service provider and the largest distributor of African news worldwide. The website operates from offices in Cape Town, Dakar, Abuja, Monrovia, Nairobi and Washington, D.C. AllAfrica is the successor to Africa News Service.

Its stories can be displayed by categories and subcategories such as country, region, and by news topic. In 2008, AllAfrica rolled out a comment board system. The website is available in both English and French. It has the contents of 127 contemporary African newspapers, and news feeds from several hundred organizations internationally. It maintains a searchable 400,000-item archive dating back to 1997. The Executive Chair of AllAfrica Global Media is Amadou Mahtar Ba.
