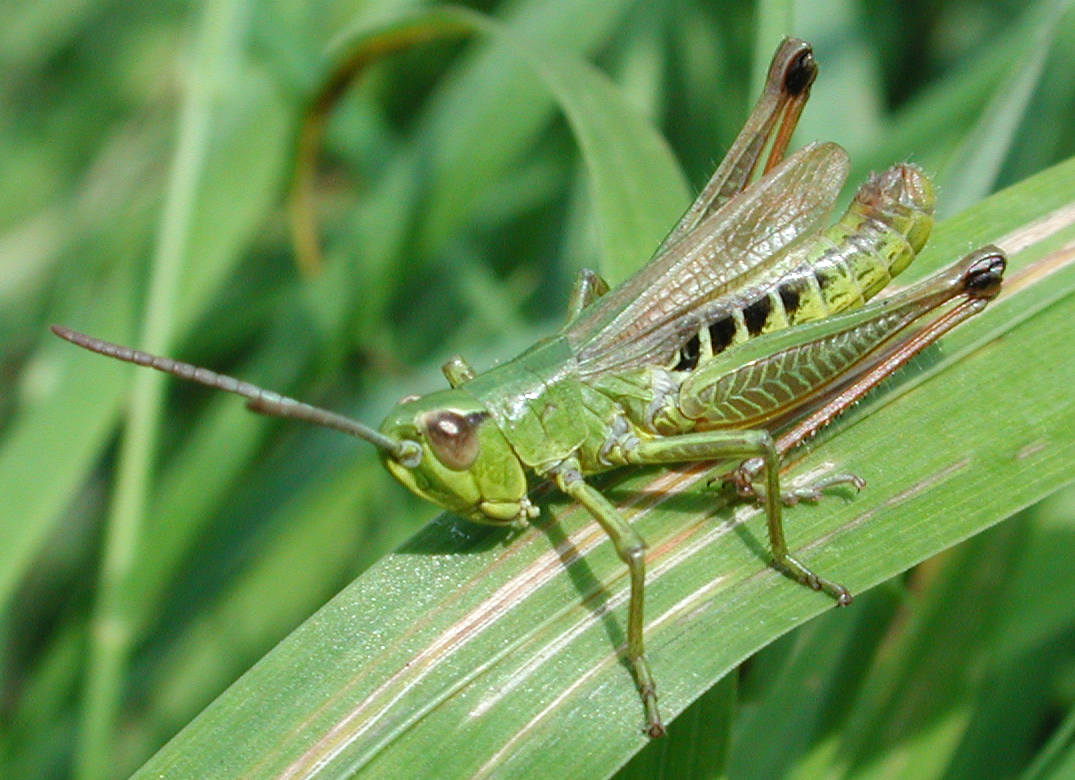
- Pseudochorthippus parallelus

Scientific classification
- Domain: Eukaryota
- Kingdom: Animalia
- Phylum: Arthropoda
- Class: Insecta
- Order: Orthoptera
- Suborder: Caelifera
- Superfamily: Acridoidea
- Family: Acrididae
- Subfamily: Gomphocerinae
- Tribe: Gomphocerini
- Genus: Pseudochorthippus; Defaut, 2012

Synonyms
- "Chorthippus" group parallelus

= Pseudochorthippus =

Genus of grasshoppers

Pseudochorthippus is a genus of grasshoppers in the tribe Gomphocerini. Insects including the 'meadow grasshopper' were previously placed in the genus Chorthippus, but are now placed here in species group parallelus (Zetterstedt, 1821). Species have been recorded from Western Europe, throughout temperate Asia and North America.

== Species ==
Pseudochorthippus includes the species:

1. Pseudochorthippus geminus (Mistshenko, 1951)
- Species in Pseudochorthippus supersp. parallelus (Zetterstedt, 1821):
1. Pseudochorthippus curtipennis (Harris, 1835): N. America
2. Pseudochorthippus montanus (Charpentier, 1825): mainland Europe: the 'water-meadow grasshopper'
3. Pseudochorthippus parallelus (Zetterstedt, 1821) – type species (as Gryllus parallelus Zetterstedt = P. parallelus parallelus): the European 'meadow grasshopper'
4. Pseudochorthippus tatrae (Harz, 1971): eastern Europe
