= Amadou Salifou =

Nigerien politician

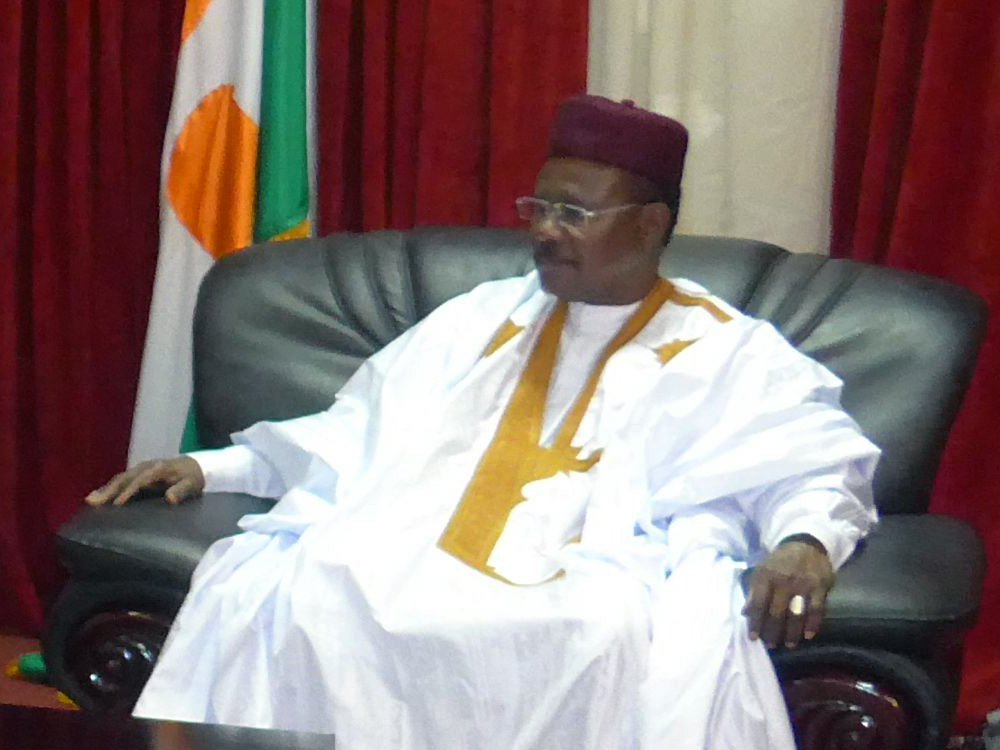
- Salifou in 2015

President of the National Assembly
- In office 24 November 2014 – 25 March 2016
- Preceded by: Hama Amadou
- Succeeded by: Ousseini Tinni

Personal details
- Party: Nigerien Party for Democracy and Socialism (since 2013)
- Other party: National Movement for the Development of Society

Amadou Salifou is a Nigerien politician who was President of the National Assembly of Niger from 2014 to 2016.

== Life and career ==
Salifou is a Zarma from the Niamey suburb of Goudel. He was elected to the National Assembly three times. Salifou also served twice as president of the council of Niamey.

Salifou was suspended from the National Movement for the Development of Society in 2013 for supporting Nigerien President Mahamadou Issoufou. On 24 November 2014, four days after Hama Amadou was removed from his post as President of the National Assembly by the Constitutional Court, Salifou was elected to replace Amadou; he received 71 out of 113 votes from the deputies of the National Assembly.

Salifou lost his seat in the 2016 general election. He was replaced as President of the National Assembly by Ousseini Tinni on 25 March 2016.
