= Kabiru Amadu =

Nigerian politician

Kabiru Amadu is a Nigerian politician. He currently serves as the Federal Representative representing Gusau/Tsafe constituency of Zamfara State in the 10th National Assembly. He also holds the position of Chairman of the House of Representatives Committee on Sports.
