= Amadou Morou =

Togolese-Polish footballer

Personal information
- Full name: Amadou Morou
- Date of birth: 22 February 1983 (age 43)
- Place of birth: Lomé, Togo
- Height: 1.85 m (6 ft 1 in)
- Position: Midfielder

Team information
- Current team: Orzeł Piątkowisko
- Number: 10

Youth career
- Étoile Filante du Togo

Senior career*
Years	Team	Apps	(Gls)
2002	UKS SMS Łódź		
2003	Pogoń Zduńska Wola		
2004	Sparta Brodnica		
2004–2006	Zdrój Ciechocinek		
2006–2008	Unia Janikowo	19	(1)
2008–2010	UKS SMS Łódź	52	(2)
2010–2011	Włókniarz Konstantynów Łódzki		
2012	Włókniarz Pabianice		
2014–	Orzeł Piątkowisko		
- * Club domestic league appearances and goals as of 19:05, 24 October 2024 (UTC)

Amadou Morou (born 22 February 1983) is a Togolose footballer who plays as a midfielder for Polish club Orzeł Piątkowisko.
