= Lyudmil Stoyanov =

Bulgarian writer (1886–1973)

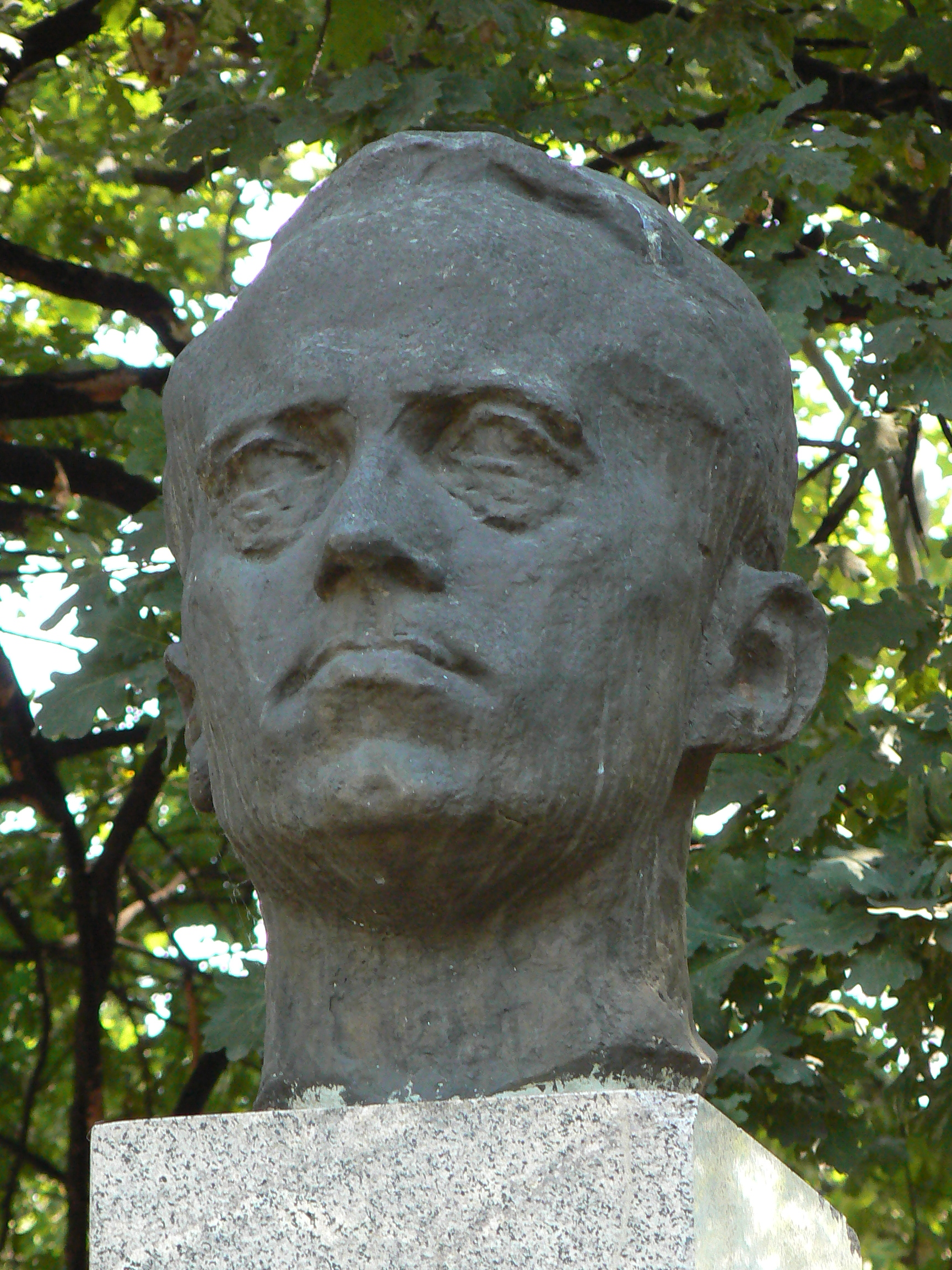
Monument of Lyudmil Stoyanov in Sofia

Georgi Stoyanov Zlatarev (Bulgarian: Георги Стоянов Златарев; 6 February 1886 – 11 April 1973), better known by his pseudonym Lyudmil Stoyanov (Людмил Стоянов), was a Bulgarian poet, writer, translator, and literary critic.

== Life and career ==
Stoyanov was born on February 6, 1886, in the family of a village teacher Stoy in village of Kovachevitsa, then in the Ottoman Empire. His father emigrated to independent Bulgaria. Stoyanov studied at the Plovdiv High School, but failed to graduate due to financial difficulties. In 1905 he settled in Sofia and worked for several months in a brick factory. At the end of the year, he became a parliamentary reporter for the Pryaporets newspaper, a body of the Democratic Party, and later of the anti-monarchist newspaper Balkan Tribune.

He took part in the Balkan Wars as a private and in the First World War he was an artilleryman and a military correspondent.

From the 1920s he became active in journalism and literature. He was a co-founder of the Studio Theater and in 1923 an editor of the Theater-Studio magazine (1923). In 1920–1921 together with Geo Milev he edited the symbolist magazine Libra. In 1924 together with Ivan Radoslavov and Teodor Trayanov edited the successor of Libra magazine Hyperion. He also wrote for the newspaper of the French Communist Party, L'Humanite.

In the 1930s he edited various left-wing and anti-fascist publications: Review of the Anti-War Movement, Shield (1933–1934), Brod (1936), Shield (1933–1934), and Helm (1933). He participated in the First International Writers' Congress for the Protection of Culture, held in Paris in 1935, and in the Second in Madrid and Valencia in 1937. He was arrested and censorship banned the publication of his texts. In 1940–1941 he was interned with his wife Maria Grubeshlieva in Pazardzhik, and later in Somovit.

After the 9 September coup, from 1946 to 1949 he was chairman of the Union of Bulgarian Writers. In 1946 he became an academician of the Bulgarian Academy of Sciences. In 1948 he was elected a member of the World Peace Council. For ten years from 1949 to 1959 he was director of the Institute of Literature of the Bulgarian Academy of Sciences.

He edited the magazine "Slavs" (1945–1969) and "September" (from 1948).

He was a deputy in the Sixth Grand National Assembly in 1946 and in the Third National Assembly in 1957–1962.

He died on April 11, 1973, in Sofia and was buried at the Central Sofia cemetery.

== Works ==
Stoyanov was a representative of Symbolism in Bulgarian literature. Unlike most of his contemporaries, Stoyanov was mostly inspired by Russian symbolism rather than French or German symbolism. From the 1930s onwards, his style gradually moved towards Socialist realism and a humanistic portrayal of everyday life.

Apart from being a writer of novels, poems and short stories, Stoyanov was also a literary critic and prolific translator. His translations included works of Russian classical literature, such as Pushkin, Lermontov, Gogol, Turgenev, Dostoevsky, Tolstoy; as well as Soviet literature: Mayakovsky, N. Ostrovsky, Mikhail Zoshchenko, Simonov, Lev Kasil, etc. And of world literature: Shakespeare, Lord Byron, Edgar Allan Poe, Jack London etc.

=== Poems ===
- Sword and Words (1913)
- Visions at the crossroads, (1914)
- Earthly life, (1940)

=== Stories ===
- Female souls, (1929)
- Mercy of Mars
- Whip of God.

=== Novels ===
- Cholera, (1935)
- Mehmed Sinap (1936)
- Alba, (1945)
