= Alhaji Salamu Amadu =

Ghanaian businessman and philanthropist

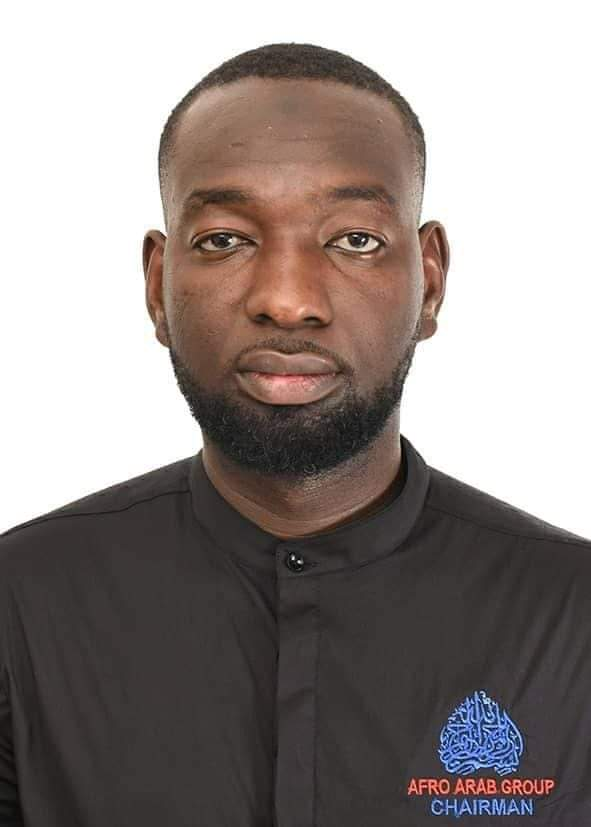
- Personal details
- Born: 3 May 1987 (age 39)
- Occupation: Entrepreneur
- Title: Ambassador
- Website: https://afroarabgroup.com

Alhaji Salamu Amadu (born 3 May 1987) is a Ghanaian businessman and philanthropist associated with affordable housing and electric mobility initiatives in Ghana. He is the founder, CEO, and board chairman of Afro Arab Group, a conglomerate with interests in various sectors, including import and export, real estate, travel and tourism, microfinance, sports and electric vehicle deployment.

He is known for initiatives aimed at improving access to housing for low and middle income earners and for promoting the adoption of electric vehicles and clean transportation solutions in Ghana.

== Early life ==
Amadu is ethnically Zarma and Hausa. He serves as the Zabarma Youth Ambassador for Ghana and Zongo Youth Ambassador, representing more than 3000 Zongo communities in the Ghana. His formative years were influenced by his family's involvement in Bureau de change, a profession characteristic of the Zarma people in Ghana, instilling in him an entrepreneurial mindset from a young age.

== Business career ==
After completing his Senior High School education in 2004, Alhaji Salamu founded Elecafetelero Ghana, initiating a livestock-keeping enterprise. In February 2007, he established Afro-Arab Company Limited, concentrating on the import and export of agricultural produce and metal scrubs. With time, he broadened the Afro-Arab Group, encompassing Afro-Arab Properties & Construction, Afro-Arab Travel & Tour, Afro-Arab Microfinance, Pure Paints West Africa, Spartans Football Club, and the Yaa Salam Opportunity Center which operates as the group's Corporate Social Responsibility arm.

== Philanthropy and social initiative ==
One of his projects is the construction of over 200,000 homes within a decade for low and middle-income earners.

In December 2025, during the Christmas season, Alhaji Salamu Amadu participated in a public community transport initiative using electric buses, which the organisation described as a free transport service for members of the public during the festive period. The initiative formed part of the group’s broader clean-energy and public mobility outreach activities.

== Honours and awards ==
Alhaji Salamu has received numerous awards and honours throughout his career. He was named the Banking and Finance Personality of the Year Africa by 40 under 40 Africa. Additionally, he has been recognized as one of the 50 Most Influential Young Ghanaians, the Young CEO of the Year, and one of the 100 Most Influential Youth in Africa.

== Notable achievements ==
- Founder, CEO, and board chairman of Afro Arab Group, a conglomerate with interests in various sectors
- Banking and Finance Personality of the Year Africa by 40 under 40 Africa (2019)
- 50 Most Influential Young Ghanaians (2022)
- Young CEO of the Year (2022)
- Sports Personality of the Yeah Africa by 40 under 40 Africa (2018)
- 100 Most Influential Youth in Africa
- Afrikicks Ambassador
- National Heritage Edition 2026
