= Ahmadlu =

Ahmadlu (Persian: احمدلو) may refer to:

- Ahmadlu, Minjavan
- Ahmadlu-ye Olya, Garamduz District
- Ahmadlu-ye Sofla, Garamduz District
