= Ousseini Tinni =

Nigerien politician

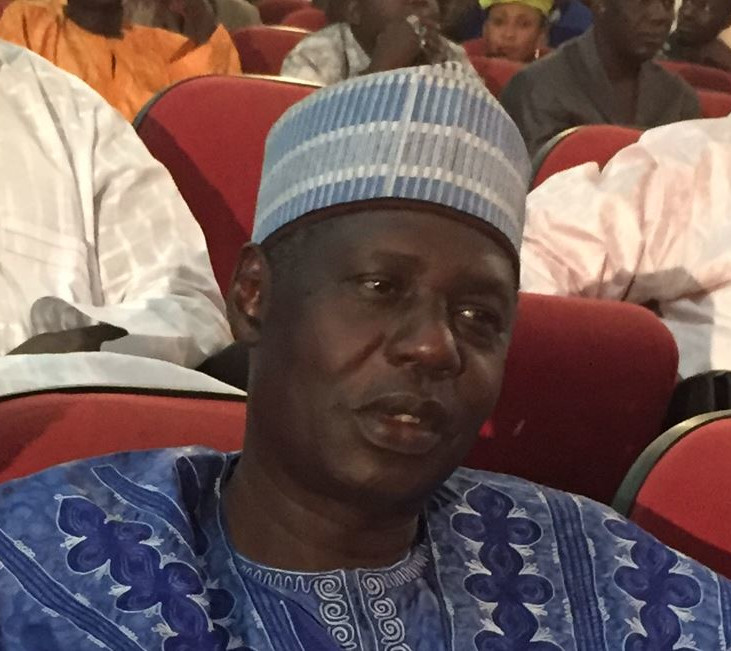
- Ousseini Tinni in 2016

President of the National Assembly
- In office 25 March 2016 – 23 March 2021
- Preceded by: Amadou Salifou
- Succeeded by: Seyni Oumarou

Personal details
- Born: 10 December 1954 (age 71) Tinoma, Dosso Region, Niger
- Party: Nigerien Party for Democracy and Socialism

Ousseini Tinni (born 10 December 1954) is a Nigerien politician of the Nigerien Party for Democracy and Socialism. He was President of the National Assembly from 25 March 2016 until 23 March 2021.

== Career ==
Tinni was born in Tinoma, in the Dosso Region. He went to high school in Marseille, France, and subsequently attended the Ecole Supérieure et des Techniques Economiques in Lomé, Togo. Tinni later worked as a civil servant at several government ministries and departments.

In the February 2016 parliamentary election, he was elected to the National Assembly as a candidate of the PNDS. On 25 March 2016 he was elected President of the National Assembly with 109 out of 118 votes in favor. Opposition deputies boycotted the vote.
