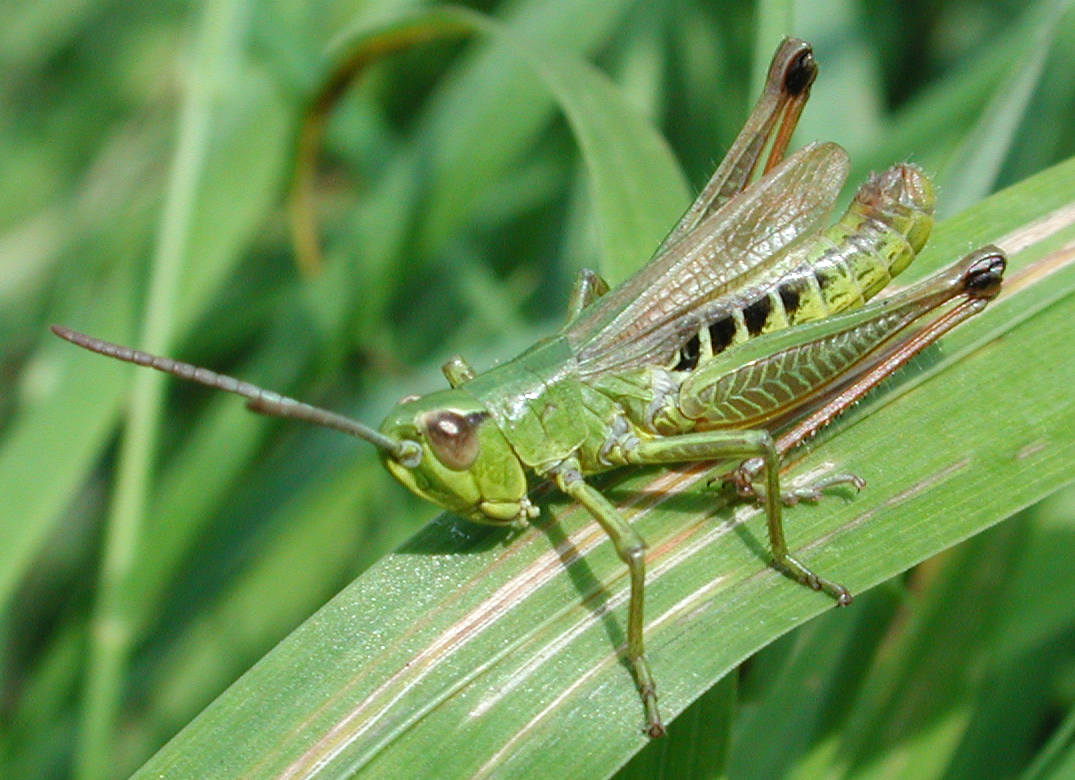
- Male
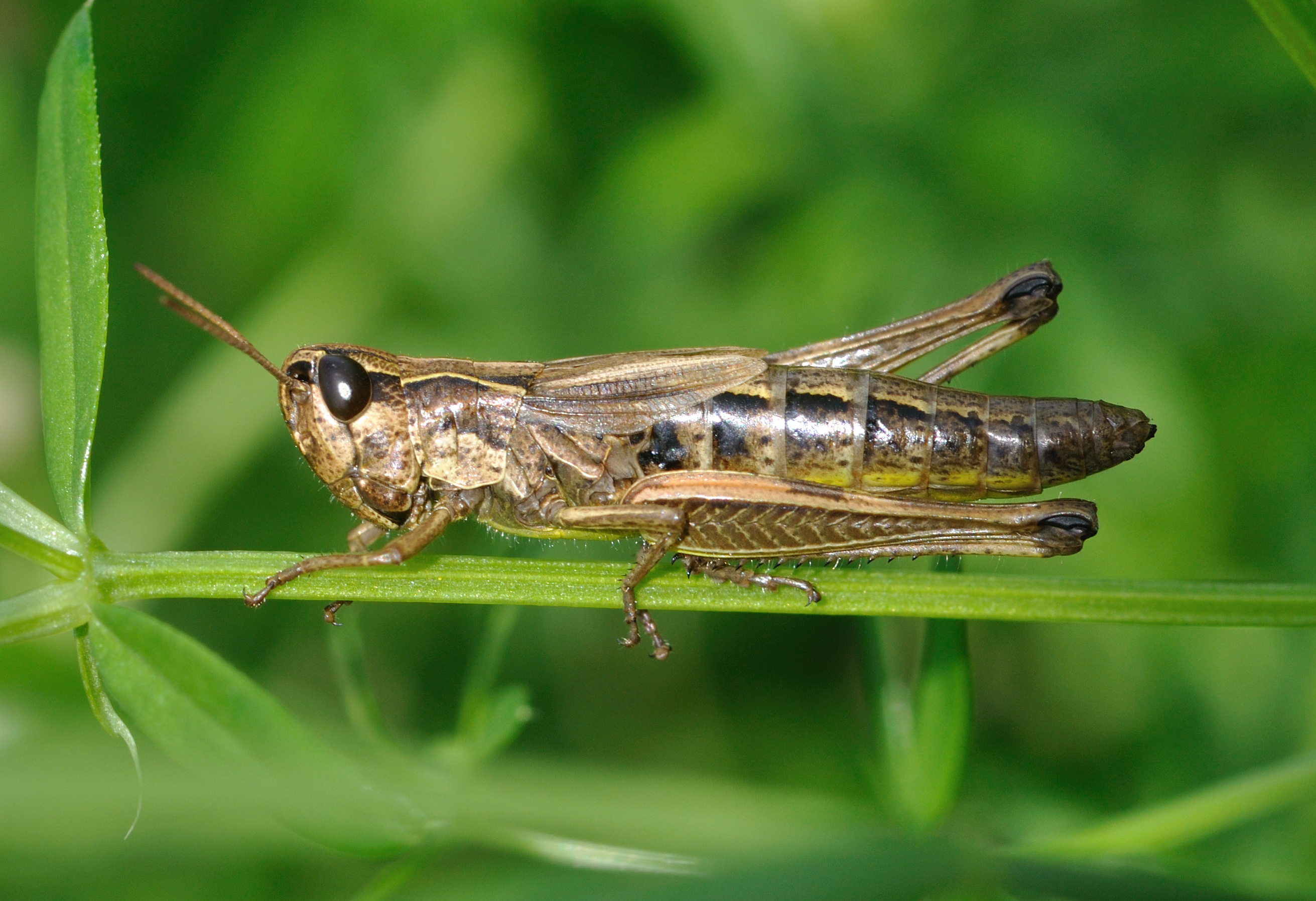
- Female

Conservation status
- Least Concern (IUCN 3.1) (Europe region assessment)

Scientific classification
- Kingdom: Animalia
- Phylum: Arthropoda
- Class: Insecta
- Order: Orthoptera
- Suborder: Caelifera
- Family: Acrididae
- Subfamily: Gomphocerinae
- Tribe: Gomphocerini
- Genus: Pseudochorthippus
- Species: P. parallelus

Binomial name
- Pseudochorthippus parallelus (Zetterstedt, 1821)

Synonyms
- Chorthippus parallelus (Zetterstedt, 1821)

= Pseudochorthippus parallelus =

Species of grasshopper

Close-Up of a Pseudochorthippus parallelus

Pseudochorthippus parallelus (often known by its synonym Chorthippus parallelus), the meadow grasshopper, is a common species of grasshopper in the tribe Gomphocerini. It is found in non-arid grasslands throughout the well vegetated areas of Europe and some adjoining areas of Asia. It is a well-studied organism in the discipline of evolutionary biology and was an early and important model system for the study of European phylogeography.

== Distribution ==
The range of the Meadow Grasshopper extends from the Atlantic coast of Europe, including the British Isles, to the Urals. It is found from Scandinavia in the north to southern Spain and Anatolia in the south. It prefers moist vegetation and in southern regions is typically found in river valleys and at high altitudes (up to approximately 2000 m), but not in arid areas.

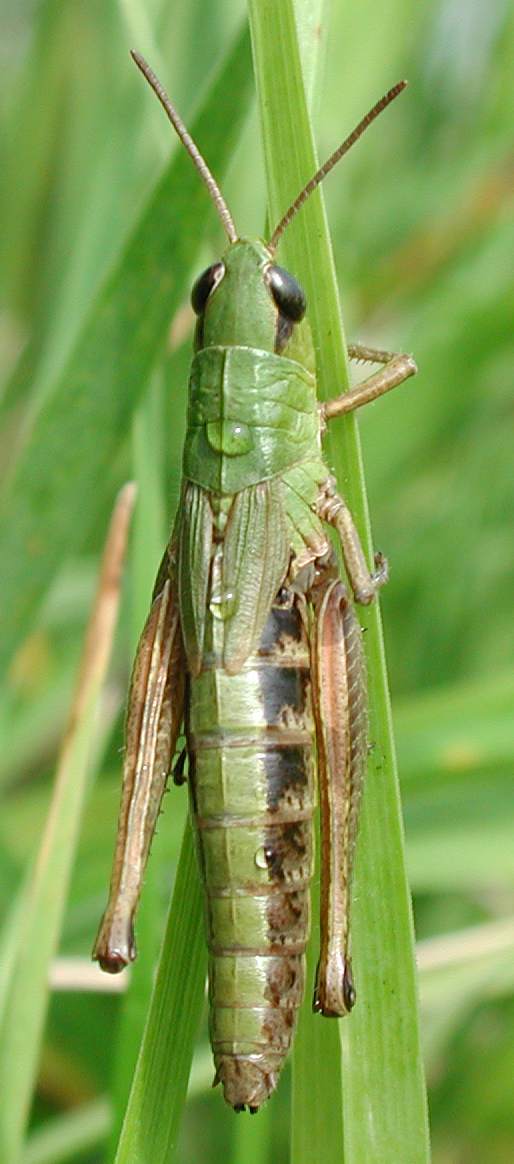
Female showing short wing cases

Sound of Pseudochorthippus parallelus
Field recording in the Netherlands 27s

== Physical appearance ==
Females grow to approximately 2 centimetres (3/4 in) and are larger and less active than males, which grow to approximately 1.5 centimetres (5/8 in). Both sexes are flightless. In females the wing cases (covering vestigial wings) extend only a short way down the abdomen, whereas in males, the wing cases extend almost to the tip of the abdomen. Their colour can vary with green, brownish, purple-red and pink forms having been recorded, although green forms are most common. Colour forms are genetically determined and some populations can show high frequency of pink grasshoppers. Pseudochorthippus parallelus is distinguished from similar species by the approximately parallel nature of the bars (pronotal side-keels) on the back of the neck which gives the species its name.

== Possible utilization for human food ==
Due to the high density of these insects in Western Europe, some researchers have proposed using them as a source of human food. These insects contain 69% protein by dry weight, with an excellent amino acid profile and digestibility. However, Aman Paul and his co-workers have indicated that, before these insects can be introduced as a food source for humans, a thorough examination must be conduced to identify any potential toxic or allergic conditions that could result from their consumption.

== Subspecies ==
Various races of the meadow grasshopper have been described in different regions with forms described as separate subspecies. They include:

1. P. parallelus erythropus (Faber, 1958) - Iberian Peninsula
2. P. parallelus parallelus (Zetterstedt, 1821) - nominate subsp., widespread including the British Isles
3. P. parallelus serbicus Karaman, Z., 1958
4. P. parallelus tenuis (Brullé, 1832) - Greece

These subspecies are the result of the allopatric separation of P. parallelus populations into separate southern European refugia during the Pleistocene ice ages.

The most widespread subspecies, P.p. parallelus, is found throughout much of Europe but is replaced by P.p. erythropus in Iberia. The Iberian erythropus subspecies is characterized in the field by red hind tibiae and differences in the mating song although other studies demonstrate additional differences in morphological, behavioural, chromosomal and DNA sequence characters. There is a hybrid zone between P.p. erythropus and P.p. parallelus running along the ridge of the Pyrenees mountains between Spain and France. A similar hybrid zone has been described between forms in France and Italy that runs along the Alps.

== Speciation ==
The subspecies do not appear to be speciating through reinforcement. This is one of the most significant pieces of evidences against speciation by reinforcement.

== Gallery ==
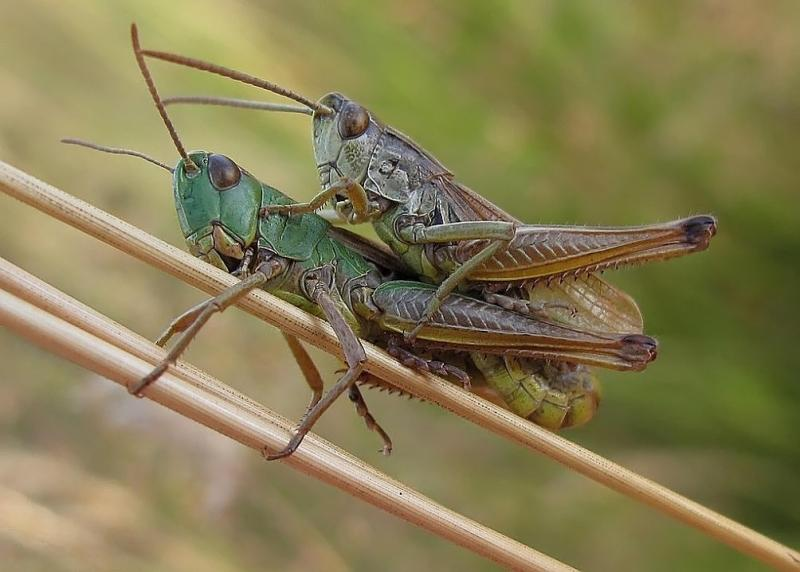
Mating

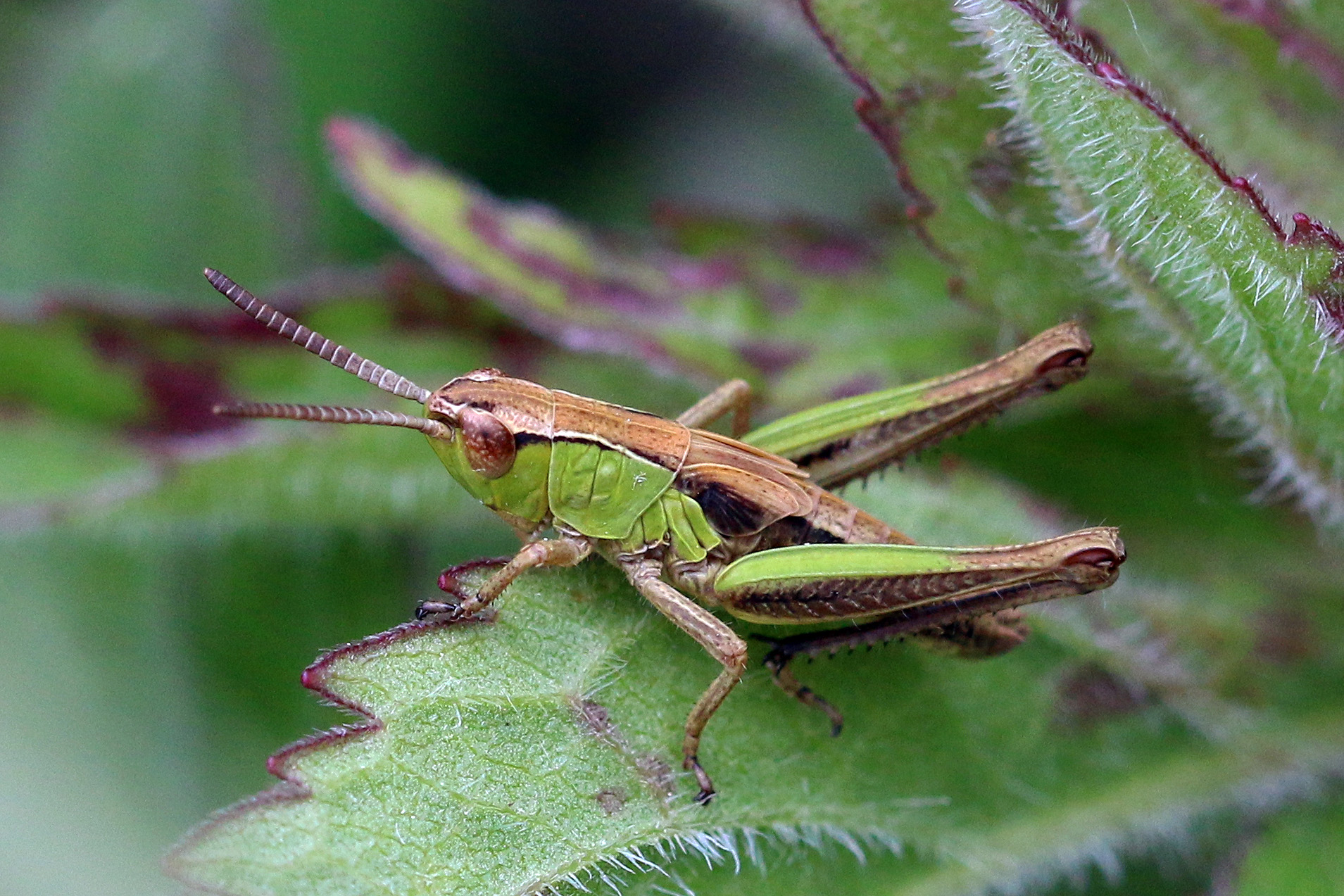
Nymph

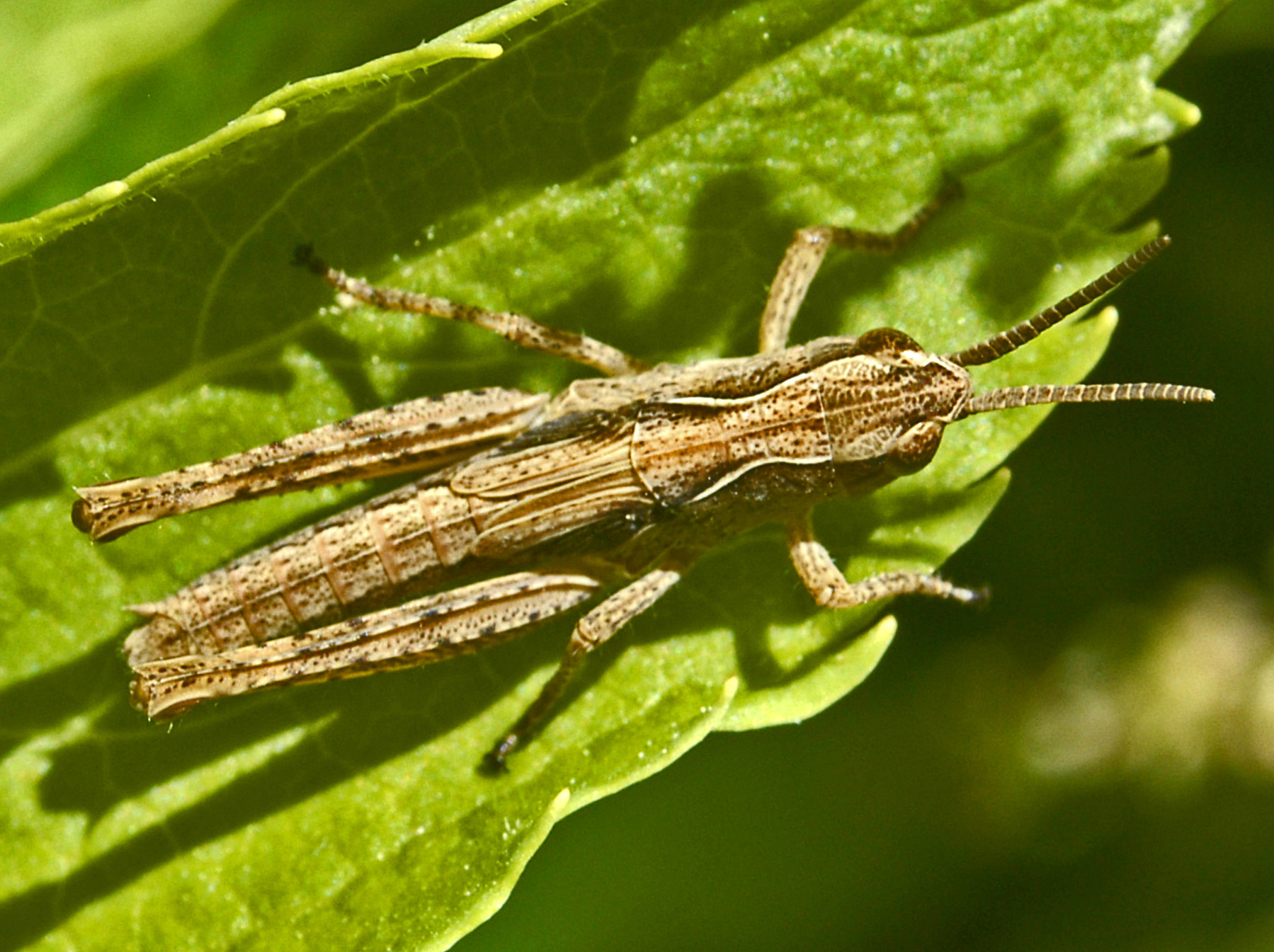
Immature

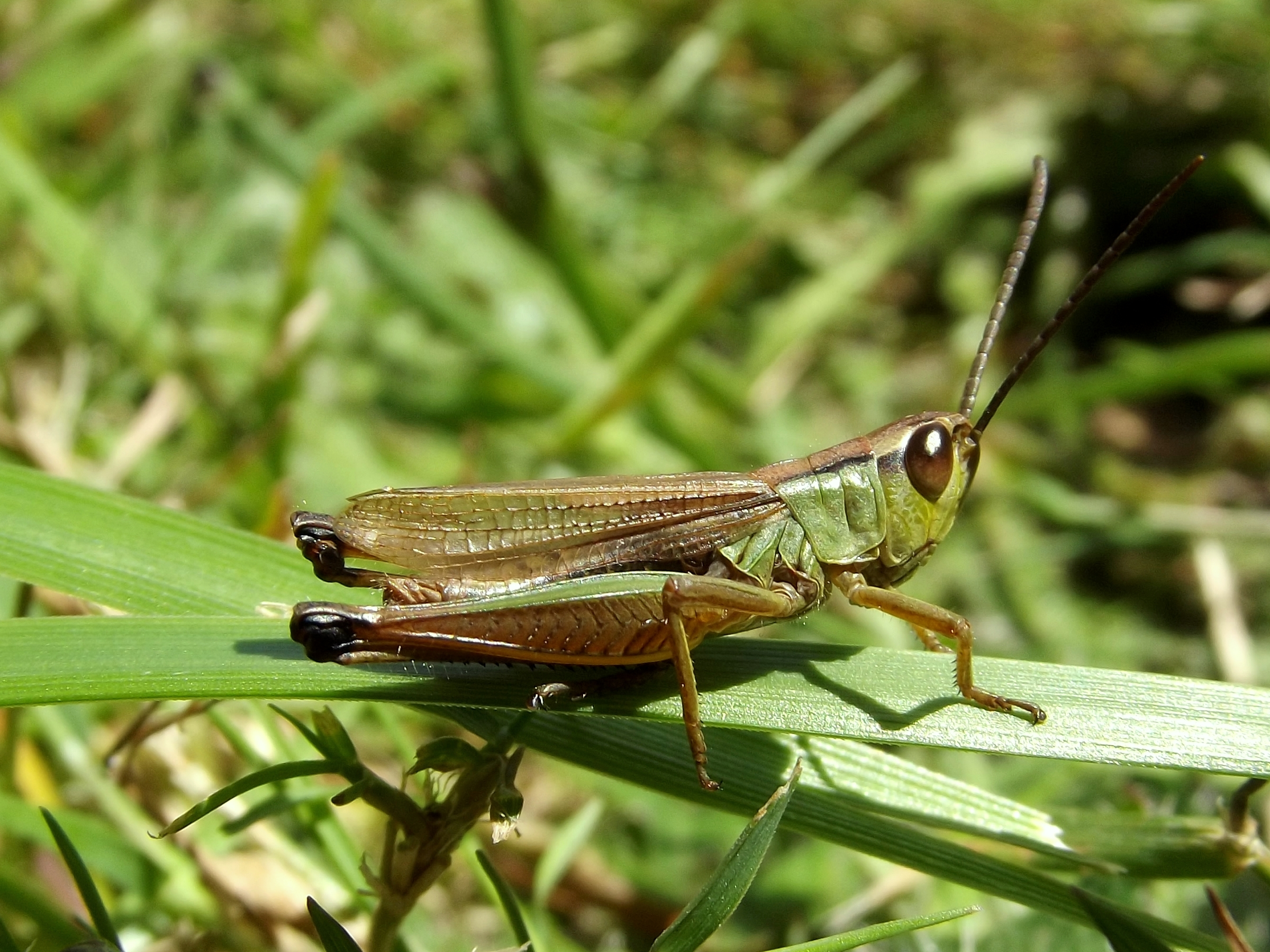
Male, green with brown wings

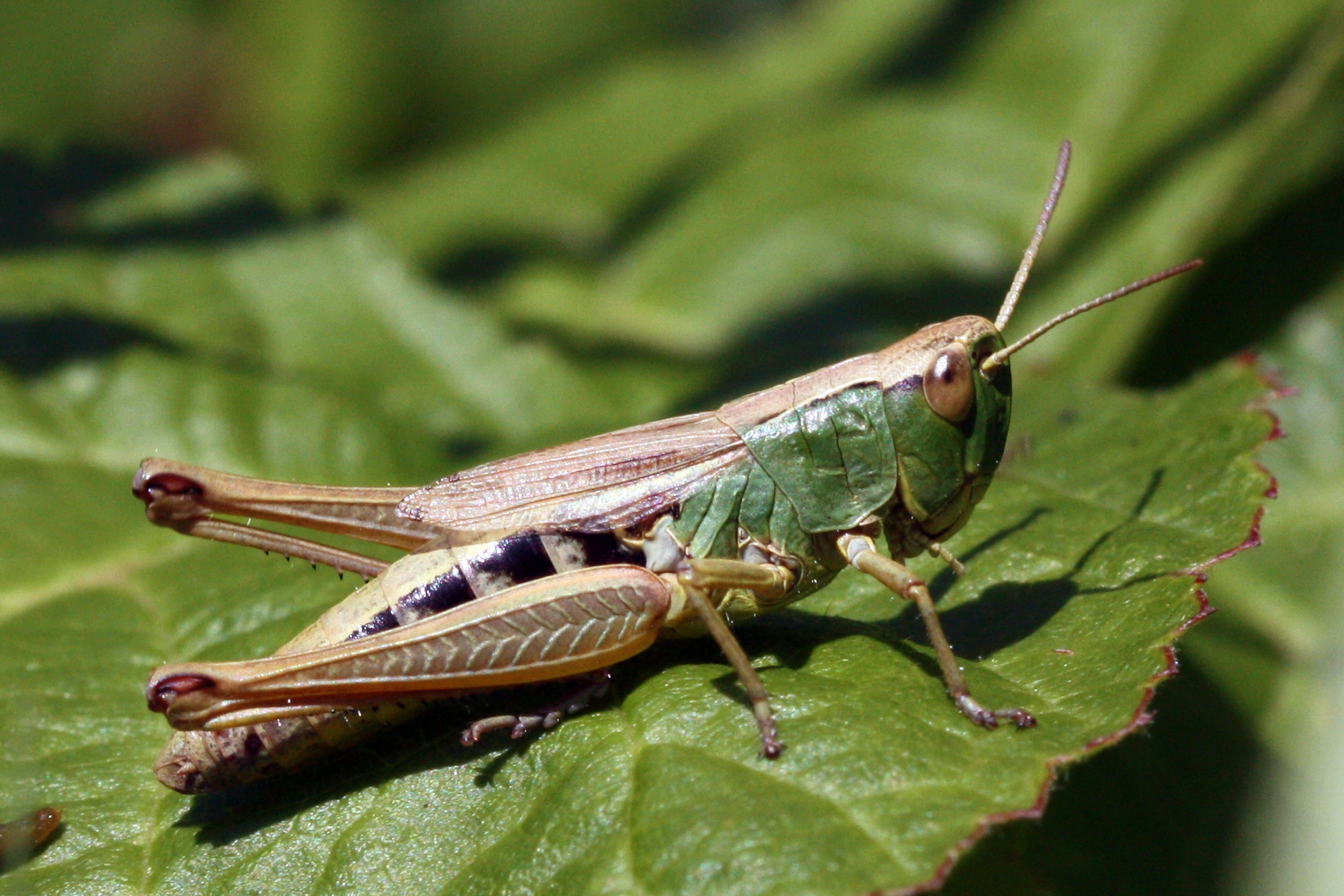
Female green form

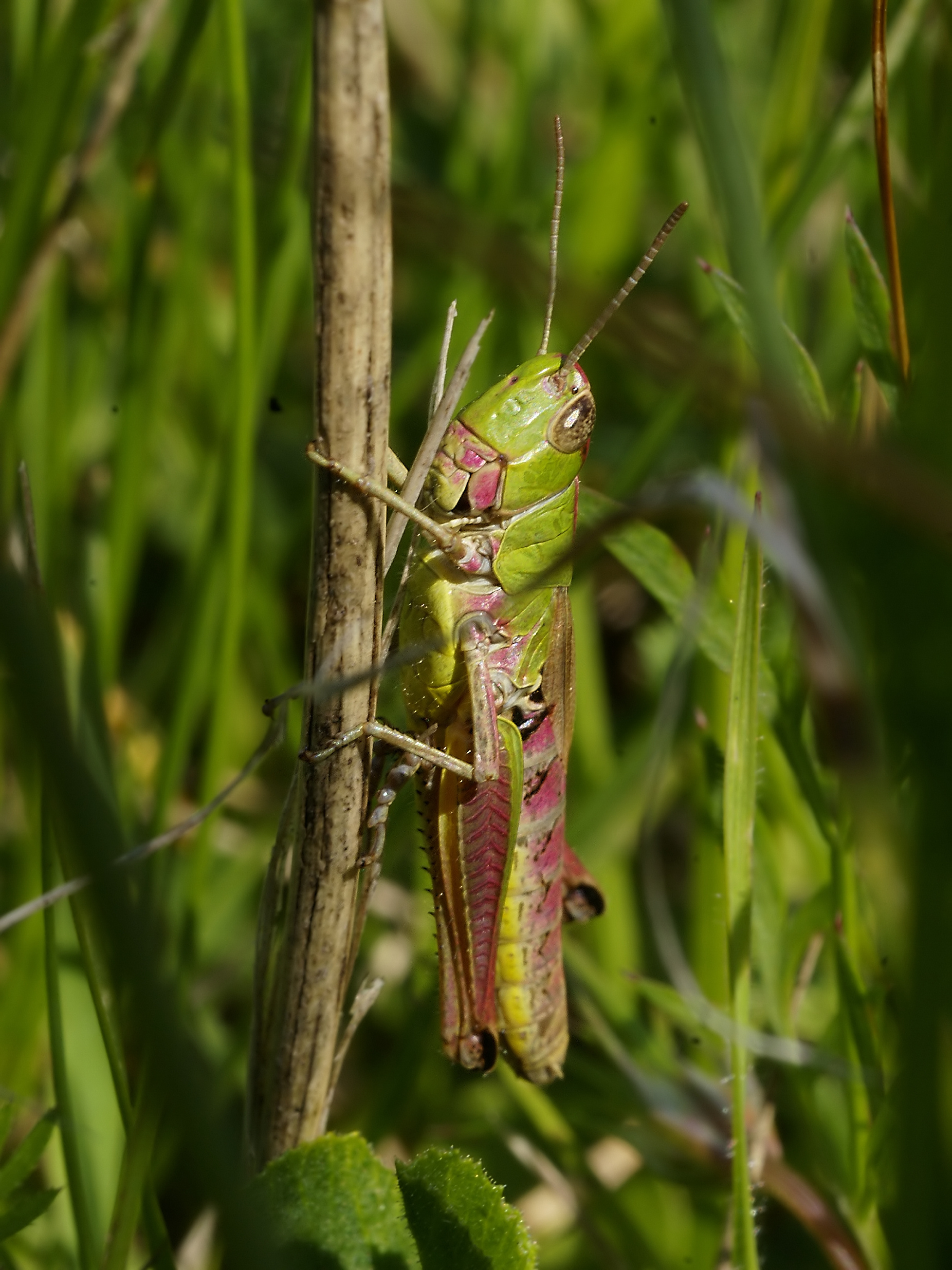
Female showing slight pink coloration
