= Amadu Baldé =

Bissau-Guinean footballer

Personal information
- Date of birth: 27 June 2005 (age 21)
- Place of birth: Bissau, Guinea-Bissau
- Height: 1.68 m (5 ft 6 in)
- Position: Winger

Team information
- Current team: Leixões
- Number: 6

Youth career
- 2021–2022: Real
- 2022–2025: Sporting CP

Senior career*
Years	Team	Apps	(Gls)
2021–2022	Real	23	(1)
2025	Sporting CP B	1	(0)
2025–	Leixões	25	(0)
- * Club domestic league appearances and goals as of 11 September 2026

Amadu Baldé (born 27 June 2005) is a Bissau-Guinean professional footballer who plays as a winger for Liga Portugal 2 club Leixões.

== Professional career ==
On 15 September 2021, Baldé signed his first professional contract with Real S.C., with a 15 million euro release clause at the age of 16. In his debut season he made 3 appearances in the 3 Liga. On 19 September 2022, he transferred to the Primeira Liga club Sporting CP, and was assigned to their U17s. In September 2022, he was named by English newspaper The Guardian as one of the best players born in 2005 worldwide.
