= Tejan Amadu Mansaray =

Sierra Leonean politician

Tejan Amadu Mansaray is a Sierra Leonean politician. He is a member of the All People's Congress party and is one of the representatives in the Parliament of Sierra Leone for Koinadugu District, elected in 2002.
