= Amadou Mahtar Ba =

Senegalese businessman

Amadou Mahtar Ba is a Senegalese businessperson who is the co-founder and executive chairman of AllAfrica Global Media Inc; and the owner and operator of AllAfrica.com. From 2009 until May 2014, he was chief executive of the African Media Initiative.

== Early life and education ==
Ba holds a master's degree from the Ecole Française des Professionnels de la Communication in Paris and Paris 7 University (Jussieu).

== Career ==
Ba served from 1996 to 2000 as director of communications and marketing for BICIS Bank. From 1993 to 1996, he helped lead the restructuring and privatization of the Panafrican News Agency (PANA). From 2009 until May 2014, he was chief executive of the African Media Initiative, He is the co-founder and executive chairman of AllAfrica Global Media Inc; and is the owner and operator of AllAfrica.com. Ba participates in the UN Secretary General's High-Level Panel on Women's Economic Empowerment, the World Economic Forum Network of Global Agenda Councils, the Africa Democratic Institute, and the Africa Policy Advisory Board of ONE.

== Recognition ==
New African magazine selected Ba as one of the "100 Most Influential Africans" of 2011, 2012 and 2013. Forbes listed him as one of "The Top 10 Most Powerful Men in Africa" in February 2014.
