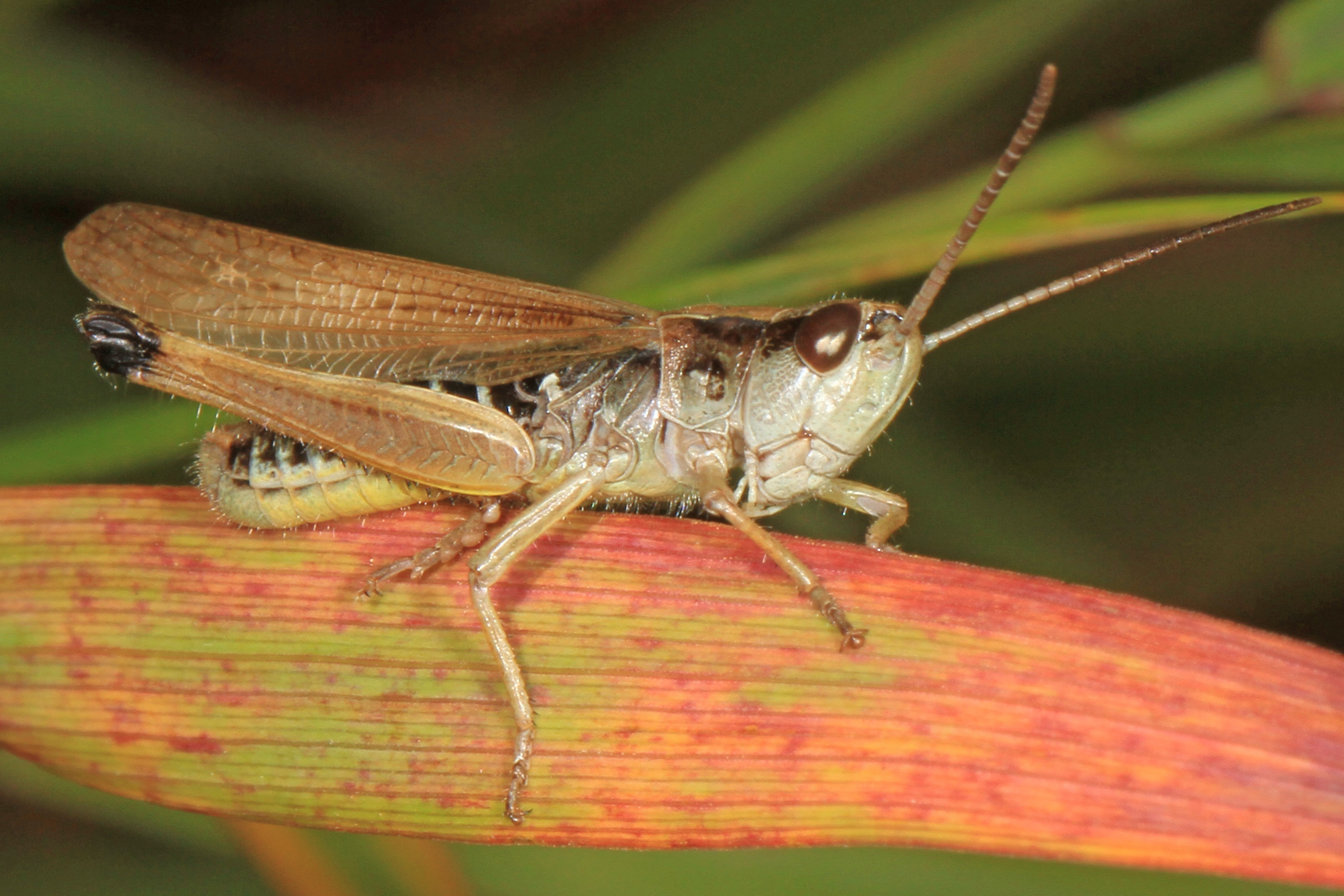

Scientific classification
- Domain: Eukaryota
- Kingdom: Animalia
- Phylum: Arthropoda
- Class: Insecta
- Order: Orthoptera
- Suborder: Caelifera
- Family: Acrididae
- Genus: Pseudochorthippus
- Species: P. curtipennis

Binomial name
- Pseudochorthippus curtipennis (Harris, 1835)

Synonyms
- Chorthippus curtipennis; Locusta curtipennis

= Pseudochorthippus curtipennis =

Species of grasshopper

Pseudochorthippus curtipennis, known generally as marsh meadow grasshopper, is a species of slant-faced grasshopper in the family Acrididae. Other common names include the meadow grasshopper and short-winged brown grasshopper. It is found in North America.

== Subspecies ==
These two subspecies belong to the species Pseudochorthippus curtipennis:

- Pseudochorthippus curtipennis californicus Vickery, 1967
- Pseudochorthippus curtipennis curtipennis (Harris, 1835)
