= Mustapha Amadu Tanko =

Ghanaian politician

Mustapha Amadu Tanko is a Ghanaian politician and a member of parliament for Bia West, Ghana. He was born in 1984 in Kumasi. He is affiliated with the National Democratic Congress (NDC).

== Education ==
Institution	Qualification	Completed
Universal Prepratory School	BECE	03-1999
Osei Kyeretwie Secondary School	SSCE	06-2002
University of Cape Coast	Diploma in Commerce	09-2011
University of Cape Coast	Bachelor of Commerce	09-2914
Barchelor of Commerce	MBA in Finance	05-2020
