= Amadou Cissé (footballer, born 1985) =

Guinean footballer

Personal information
- Date of birth: 23 October 1985 (age 41)
- Place of birth: Conakry, Guinea
- Height: 1.90 m (6 ft 3 in)
- Position: Midfielder

Youth career
- 2000–2002: GSI Pontivy

Senior career*
Years	Team	Apps	(Gls)
2002–2006	Pontivy	85	(15)
2006–2008	Aubervillers		
2008–2009	Slavia Prague	2	(0)
2010–2011	Bohemians 1905	17	(0)
2011	→ 1. FC Slovácko (loan)	1	(0)
2011–2015	Aubervilliers	80	(0)

International career
2010	Guinea	2	(0)
- * Club domestic league appearances and goals

Amadou Cissé (born 23 October 1985) is a Guinean former professional footballer who played as a midfielder. He made two appearances for the Guinea national team in 2010.

== Career ==
Born in Conakry, Cissé began his career with GSI Pontivy and in 2002 was promoted to the first team who played in the Championnat de France Amateurs. In 2006, he moved to league rivals Aubervilliers, where he remained for two seasons. Cissé joined Czech Republic side Slavia Prague in July 2008. He played his first game in the UEFA Cup against Ajax on 17 December 2008 and his first League game in the Gambrinus liga came on 23 February 2009 against Viktoria Plzeň. Following spells with Bohemians 1905 and 1. FC Slovácko, Cissé returned to Aubervilliers in the summer of 2011 and spent a further four seasons with the club.

In 2010, while playing for Bohemians, Cissé won two caps for the Guinea national team, playing in friendly matches against Mali and Ethiopia.
