= Robel pole =

A Robel pole is a device consisting of a 1 to 2 m (3 ft 3 in to 6 ft 7 in) vertical pole possessing alternating horizontal bands and a 4 m (13 ft) line of rope or cord. It is used by range ecologists, field biologists and other scientists to measure the density of vegetation and to quantify the volume of ground cover in a particular habitat using the visual obstruction (VO) measurement method. The Robel pole is named for Robert J. Robel, the scientist who developed the device and technique. Modifications of Robel's original design have been developed and published; all use the VO method.
