= Amadou Doucoure =

Malian politician

Amadou Doucoure (1919 in Goumbou, Mali – November 15, 1971, in Bamako) was a Malian politician who was elected to the French Senate in 1947.
