= Amadou Cissé Dia =

Senegalese politician and playwright

Amadou Cissé Dia (2 June 1915 – 1 November 2002) was a Senegalese politician and playwright.

== Biography ==
Born in Saint-Louis, Senegal, he wrote plays in French including Les Derniers Jours de Lat Dior, which concerns a griot's praise for Lat-Dior. In politics, Dia served as the second President of the National Assembly from 1968 to 1983, and as Minister of the Interior. He was reportedly nominated for the Nobel Peace Prize in the year Willy Brandt won.

He died in Dakar on 1 November 2002 at the age of 87.

== Plays ==
- La mort du Damel
- Les derniers jours de Lat Dior
