= Ahmadu =

Ahmadu can refer to:

Several leaders of the West African Massina Empire:

- Seku Amadu (1773–1845), Islamic sheikh and founder of the Massina Empire
- Amadu II of Masina (r. 1845–1852), his son
- Amadu III of Masina (1852–1862), his grandson

Other persons:

- Ahmadu Tall or Ahmadu Seku (1864–1892), the last independent Toucouleur ruler before the arrival of French colonial rule
- Ahmadu Bello, the first Premier of Northern Nigeria
