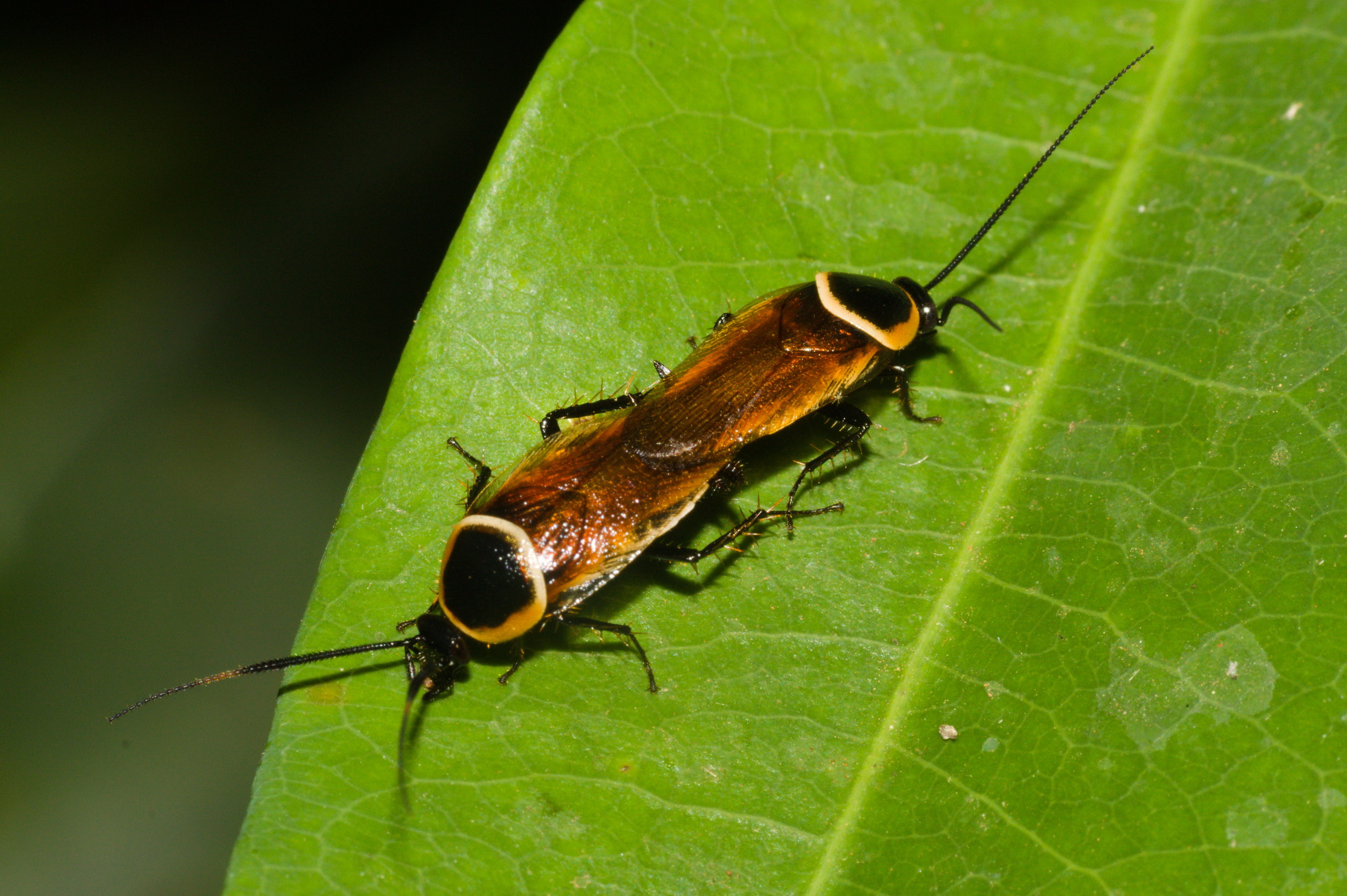

Scientific classification
- Kingdom: Animalia
- Phylum: Arthropoda
- Clade: Pancrustacea
- Class: Insecta
- Order: Blattodea
- Family: Ectobiidae
- Genus: Pseudomops
- Species: P. neglectus

Binomial name
- Pseudomops neglectus Shelford, 1906

= Pseudomops neglectus =

Species of cockroach

Pseudomops neglectus is a species from the genus Pseudomops.
