= Neotemnopteryx =

Scientific classification
- Kingdom: Animalia
- Phylum: Arthropoda
- Clade: Pancrustacea
- Class: Insecta
- Order: Blattodea
- Family: Ectobiidae
- Subfamily: Blattellinae
- Genus: Neotemnopteryx; Princis, 1951

Genus of cockroaches

Neotemnopteryx is a genus of cockroaches, from Australia and New Zealand, in the family, Ectobiidae.

== Taxonomy ==
Neotemnopteryx contains the following species:

- Neotemnopteryx bifurcata
- Neotemnopteryx fulva
