= Pseudopsyra =

Scientific classification
- Domain: Eukaryota
- Kingdom: Animalia
- Phylum: Arthropoda
- Class: Insecta
- Order: Orthoptera
- Suborder: Ensifera
- Family: Tettigoniidae
- Subfamily: Phaneropterinae
- Tribe: Holochlorini
- Genus: Pseudopsyra; Hebard, 1922

Genus of bush-crickets

External image
- Images at iNaturalist

Pseudopsyra is an Asian genus of sickle-bearing bush-crickets, in the tribe Holochlorini, erected by Morgan Hebard in 1922. The recorded species distribution (possibly incomplete) includes China, including Hainan, Thailand and Peninsular Malaysia.

== Species ==
A key to species is provided by Tan and Kamaruddin; the Orthoptera Species File lists:

1. Pseudopsyra bispina Tan & Kamaruddin, 2013
2. Pseudopsyra hainani Liu & Kang, 2006
3. Pseudopsyra mirabilis Hebard, 1922 - type species
4. Pseudopsyra taksini Tan, Dawwrueng & Artchawakom, 2017
5. Pseudopsyra yunnani Liu & Kang, 2006
