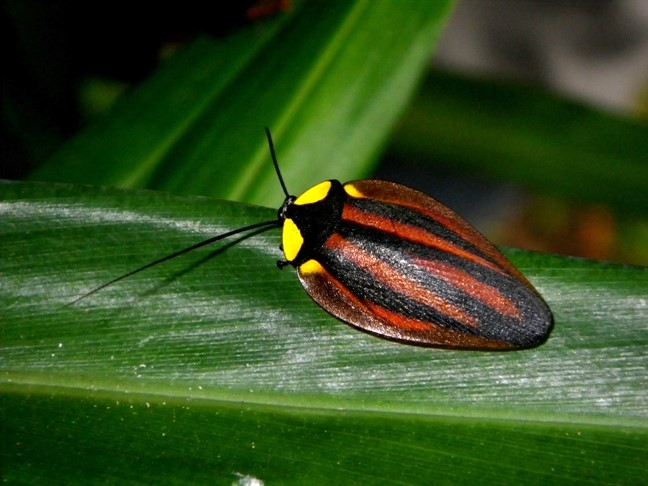

Scientific classification
- Kingdom: Animalia
- Phylum: Arthropoda
- Clade: Pancrustacea
- Class: Insecta
- Order: Blattodea
- Family: Ectobiidae
- Genus: Paratropes
- Species: P. bilunata

Binomial name
- Paratropes bilunata (Saussure & Zehntner, 1893)

= Paratropes bilunata =

Species of cockroach

Paratropes bilunata is a species of cockroach within the family Ectobiidae, that can be found in Costa Rica and Panama.
