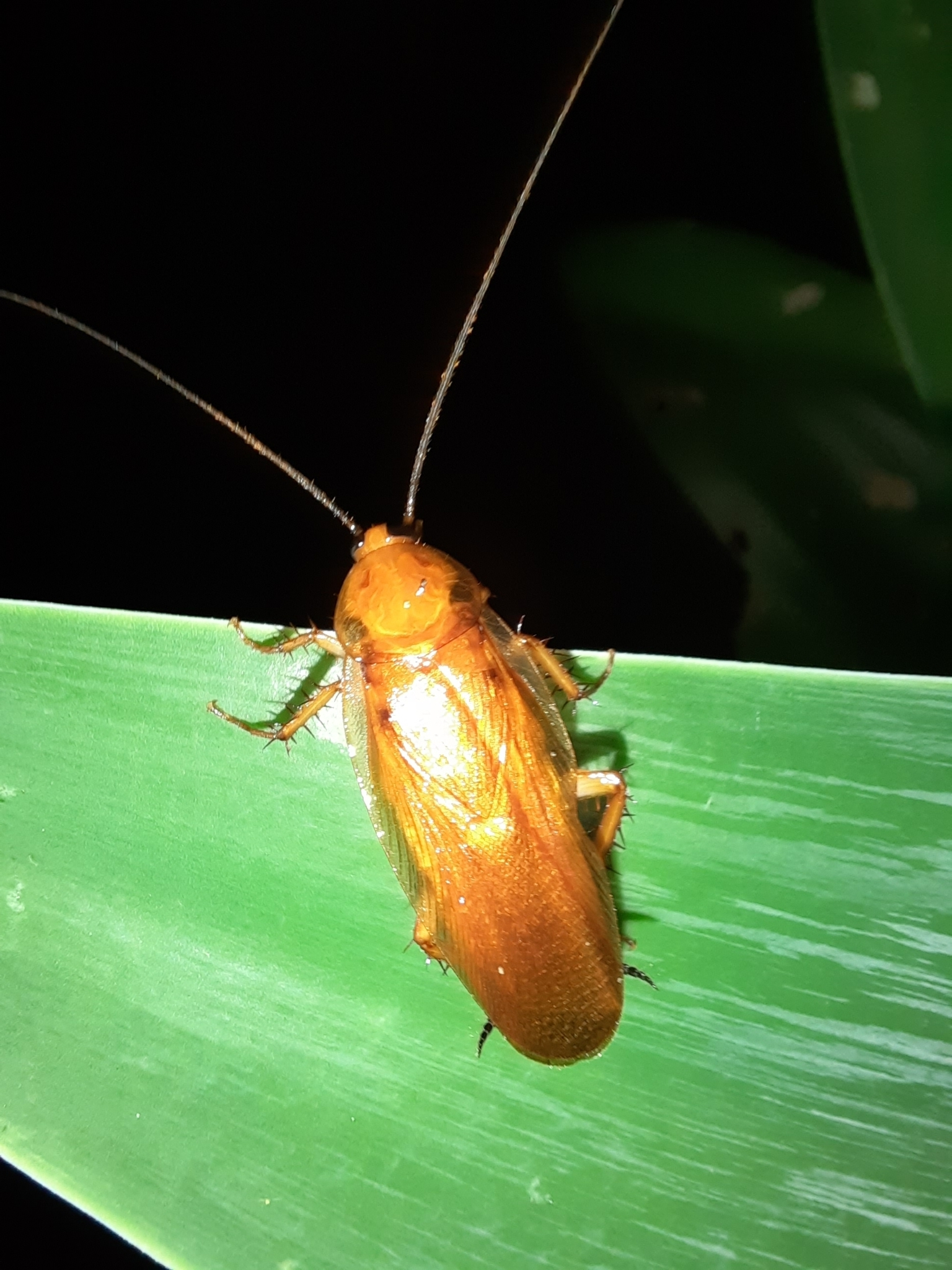

Scientific classification
- Kingdom: Animalia
- Phylum: Arthropoda
- Clade: Pancrustacea
- Class: Insecta
- Order: Blattodea
- Family: Ectobiidae
- Genus: Neotemnopteryx
- Species: N. fulva

Binomial name
- Neotemnopteryx fulva (Saussure, 1863)

= Neotemnopteryx fulva =

Species of cockroach

Neotemnopteryx fulva is a species from the genus Neotemnopteryx.
