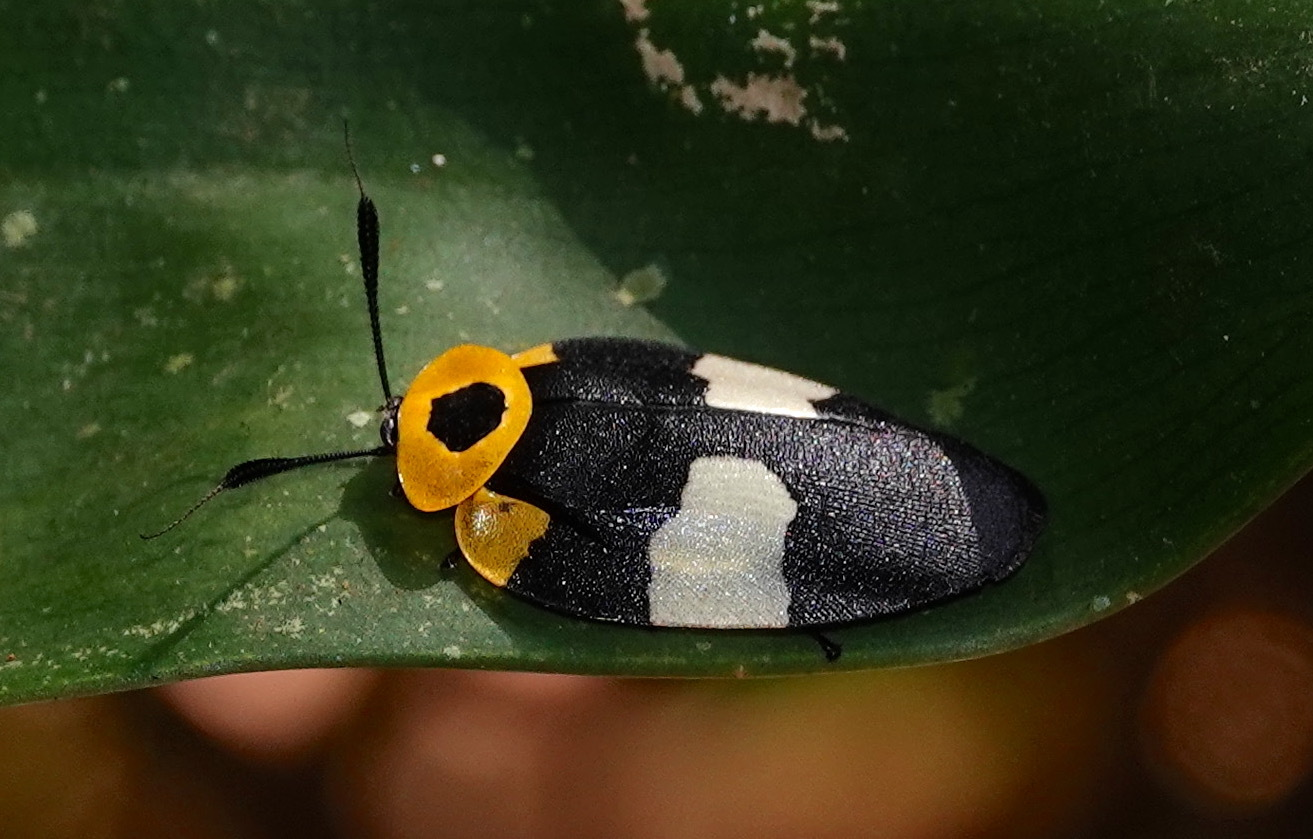
- Eushelfordia pica

Scientific classification
- Kingdom: Animalia
- Phylum: Arthropoda
- Clade: Pancrustacea
- Class: Insecta
- Order: Blattodea
- Family: Ectobiidae
- Subfamily: Nyctiborinae
- Genus: Eushelfordia; Hebard, 1925

= Eushelfordia =

Genus of cockroaches

Eushelfordia is a genus of cockroaches from the family Ectobiidae. These brightly marked cockroaches are native to forests in the Amazon basin in South America.

== Taxonomy ==
Eushelfordia contains the following species:

- Eushelfordia amazonensis
- Eushelfordia pica
