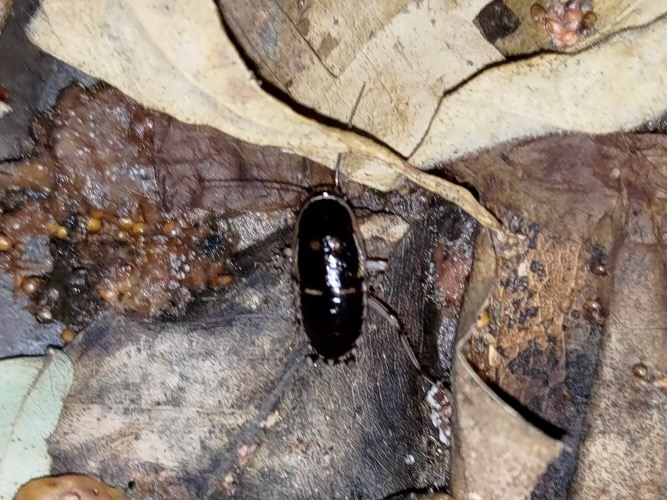

Scientific classification
- Kingdom: Animalia
- Phylum: Arthropoda
- Clade: Pancrustacea
- Class: Insecta
- Order: Blattodea
- Family: Ectobiidae
- Genus: Lobopterella
- Species: L. dimidiatipes

Binomial name
- Lobopterella dimidiatipes (Bolívar, 1890)

= Lobopterella dimidiatipes =

Species of cockroach

Lobopterella dimidiatipes is a species from the genus Lobopterella. It can be found in Japan and Christmas Island.
