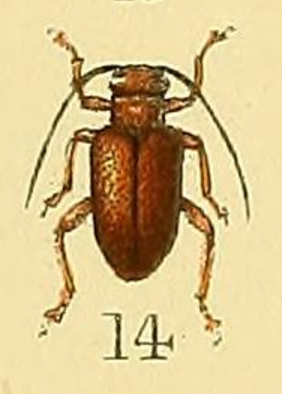

Scientific classification
- Kingdom: Animalia
- Phylum: Arthropoda
- Class: Insecta
- Order: Coleoptera
- Suborder: Polyphaga
- Infraorder: Cucujiformia
- Family: Cerambycidae
- Genus: Entelopes
- Species: E. shelfordi

Binomial name
- Entelopes shelfordi Aurivillius, 1923

= Entelopes shelfordi =

Species of beetle

Entelopes shelfordi is a species of beetle in the family Cerambycidae. It was named by Per Olof Christopher Aurivillius in 1923 based on a description and illustration by Robert Walter Campbell Shelford in 1902. It is known from Borneo.

Shelford wrote that this species mimicked the species Metrioidea apicalis in the family Galerucidae.
