= Paratropes fossilis =

Paratropes fossilis Temporal range: 94.3–89.3 Ma

Scientific classification
- Kingdom: Animalia
- Phylum: Arthropoda
- Clade: Pancrustacea
- Class: Insecta
- Order: Blattodea
- Family: Ectobiidae
- Genus: Paratropes
- Species: †P. fossilis

Binomial name
- †Paratropes fossilis Vršanský & Anisyutkin, 2008

Extinct species of insect

Paratropes fossilis is an extinct species of cockroach within the family Ectobiidae that lived during the Cretaceous period. The holotype is an isolated right tegmen 24 millimeters in length. The type locality is in the Gerofit Locality within the Ora Formation located in Israel.
