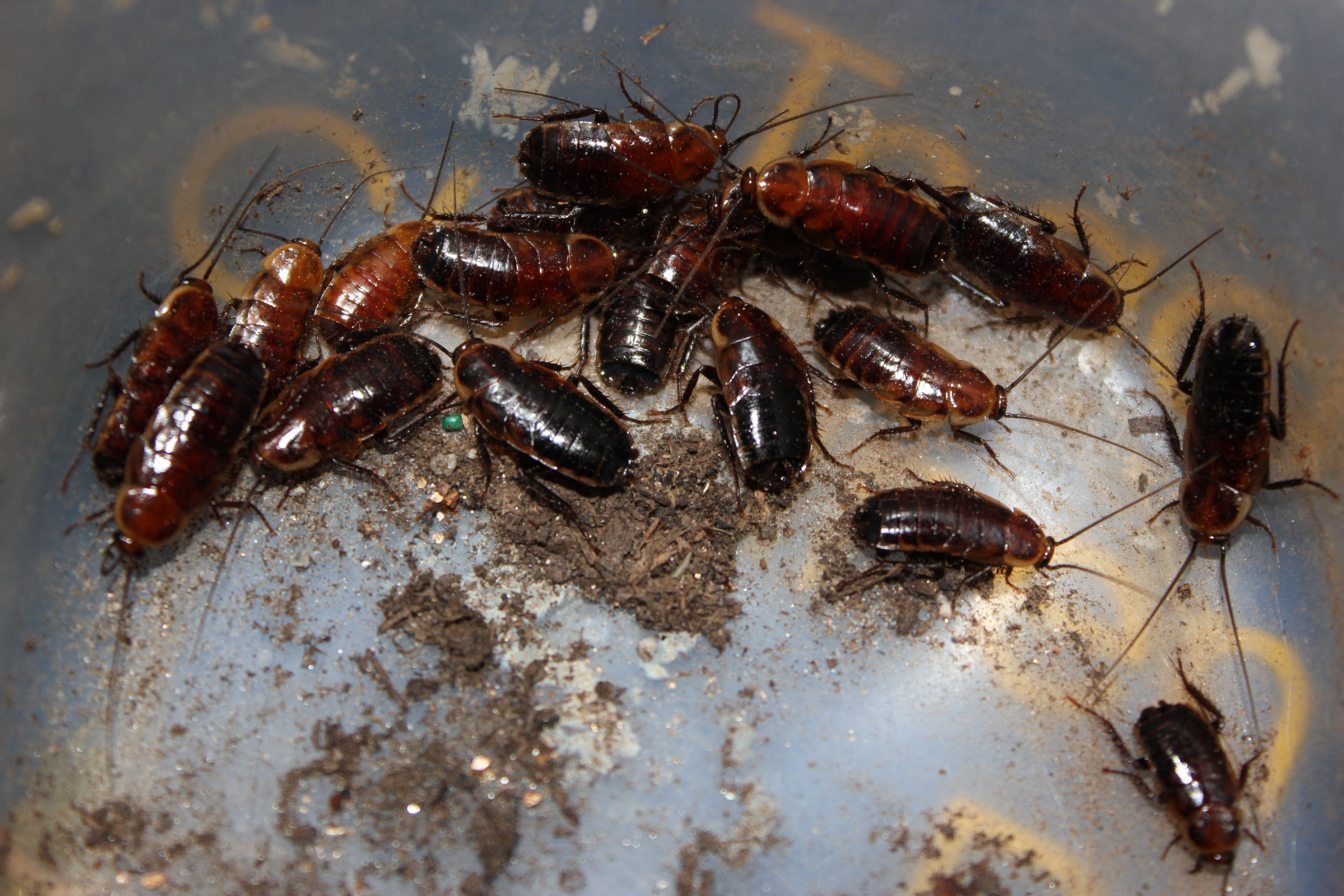
- Parcoblatta divisa nymphs

Scientific classification
- Kingdom: Animalia
- Phylum: Arthropoda
- Clade: Pancrustacea
- Class: Insecta
- Order: Blattodea
- Family: Ectobiidae
- Genus: Parcoblatta
- Species: P. divisa

Binomial name
- Parcoblatta divisa (Saussure & Zehntner, 1893)

Synonyms
- Ischnoptera divisa Saussure & Zehntner 1893

= Parcoblatta divisa =

Species of cockroach

Parcoblatta divisa, the southern wood cockroach, is a species of cockroach native to the United States.

Due to morphological similarities, it was earlier considered a subspecies of Parcoblatta pensylvanica, termed P. pensylvanica divisa, found in the lower part of the southeastern United States. In particular, males of the two species are different from others of their genus in that the seventh dorsal abdominal segment conceals almost all of the eighth segment (more pronounced in P. pensylvanica), and share a specialialized character of protuberances of the median segment.

Individuals of the species are typically dark in color, but a pale morph is uniquely found in Alachua County, Florida, with no dark individuals among hundreds of specimens collected from the location.

	Male	Female
Body length	13.8–17.6 mm (0.54–0.69 in)	12.7–16.5 mm (0.50–0.65 in)
Pronotum length	3.6–4.6 mm (0.14–0.18 in)	3.7–4.9 mm (0.15–0.19 in)
Pronotum width	4.8–6.2 mm (0.19–0.24 in)	4.7–6.6 mm (0.19–0.26 in)
Tegmina length	16.4–20.8 mm (0.65–0.82 in)	7.2–10.8 mm (0.28–0.43 in)
Tegmina width	5.1–6.6 mm (0.20–0.26 in)	4.0–4.9 mm (0.16–0.19 in)

== Distribution ==
The distribution of the species includes the eastern and southeastern United States, including Alabama, Arkansas, Delaware, Florida, Georgia, Kansas, Louisiana, Maryland, Mississippi, New Jersey, North Carolina, Oklahoma, Pennsylvania, Tennessee, Texas, Virginia, and Wisconsin.

== Habitat ==
Parcoblatta divisa has been found in diverse habitats including dry pine lands, oak scrub, moist hammocks of northern Florida, and cool ravines along Florida's Apalachicola River.

Many collected specimens have been taken from under signs attached to trees (red and white oaks, shortleaf and longleaf pines, American sweet gum, and other deciduous trees), and trapped in molasses-baited jars. One researcher who collected specimens extensively found it to be the most adaptable of the Parcoblatta species, trapping adults among logs and undergrowth on the borders of woodland areas, and taking specimens from pasture grasses, in grass under backyard trees, under dried cow dung, under trash and debris at woodland campsights, and from homes in wooded areas, which the species is sometimes reported to invade.

== Additional images ==
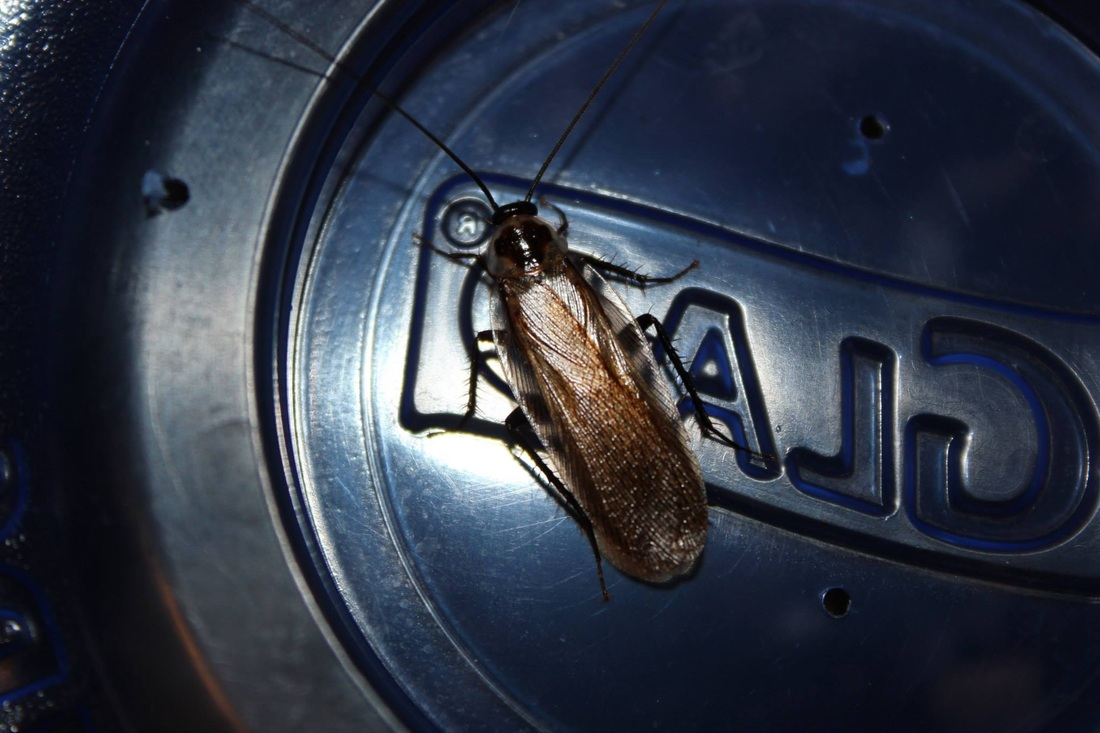
Adult male

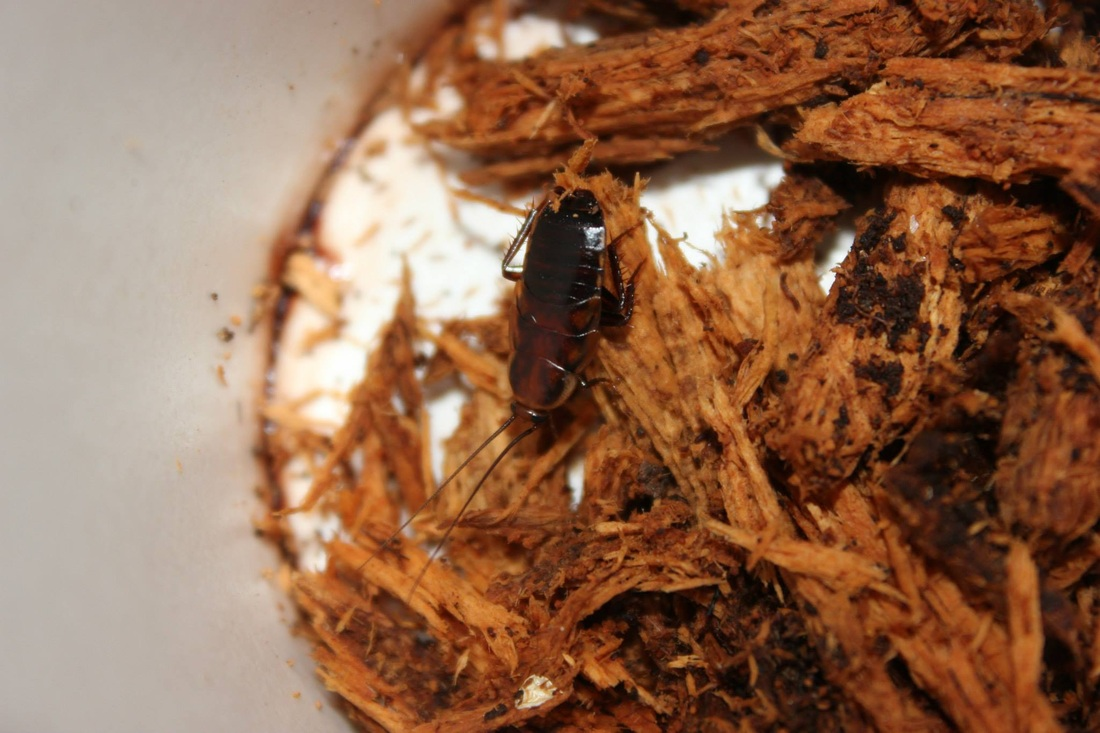
Male P. divisa nymph from North Carolina.
