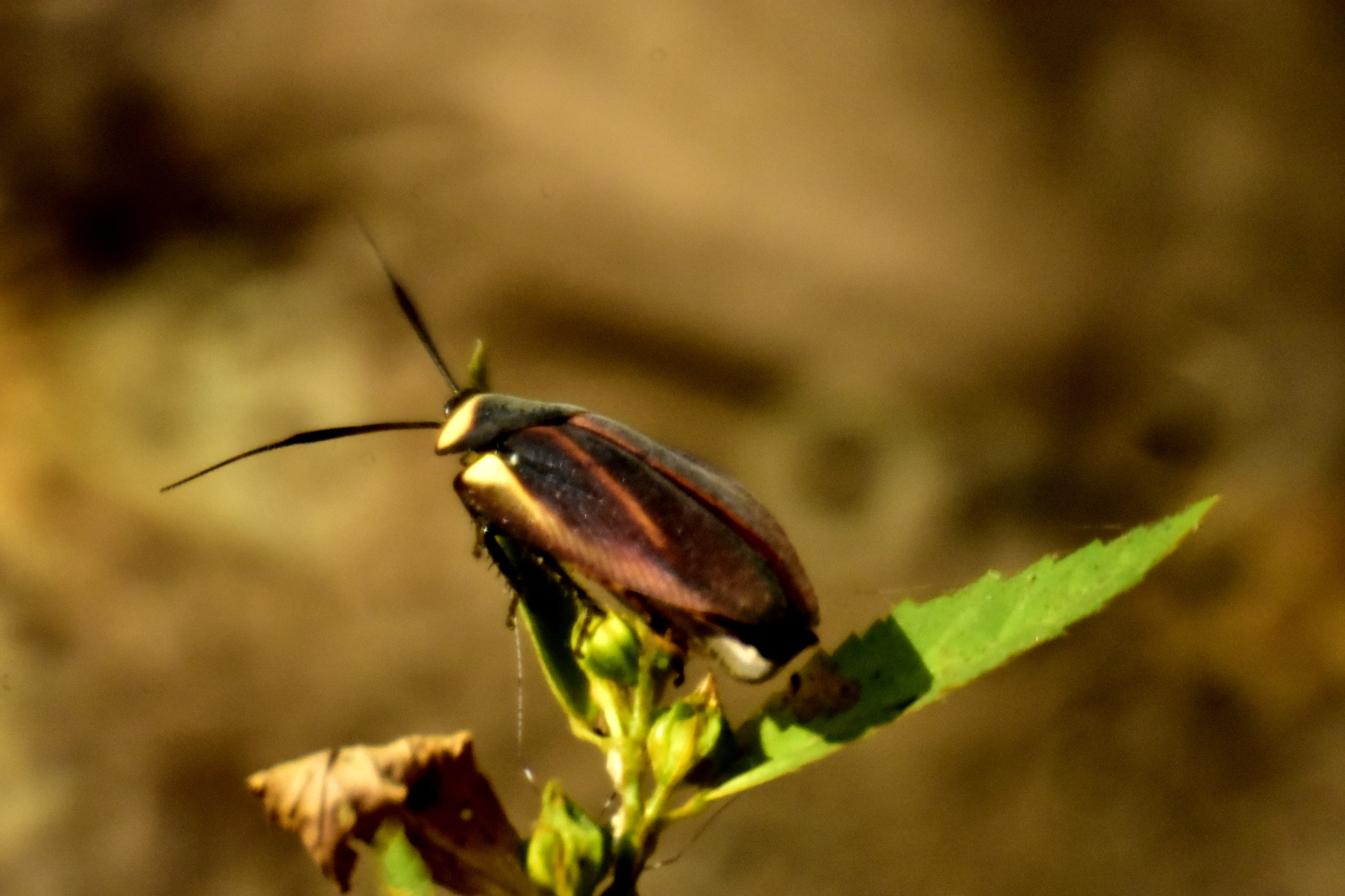

Scientific classification
- Kingdom: Animalia
- Phylum: Arthropoda
- Clade: Pancrustacea
- Class: Insecta
- Order: Blattodea
- Family: Ectobiidae
- Genus: Paratropes
- Species: P. mexicana

Binomial name
- Paratropes mexicana Brunner von Wattenwyl, 1865

= Paratropes mexicana =

Species of insect

Paratropes mexicana is a species of cockroach within the family Ectobiidae that is distributed in Mexico. States within the Mexico the species is found in include Hidalgo, Veracruz, Tlaxcala, and Chiapas.
