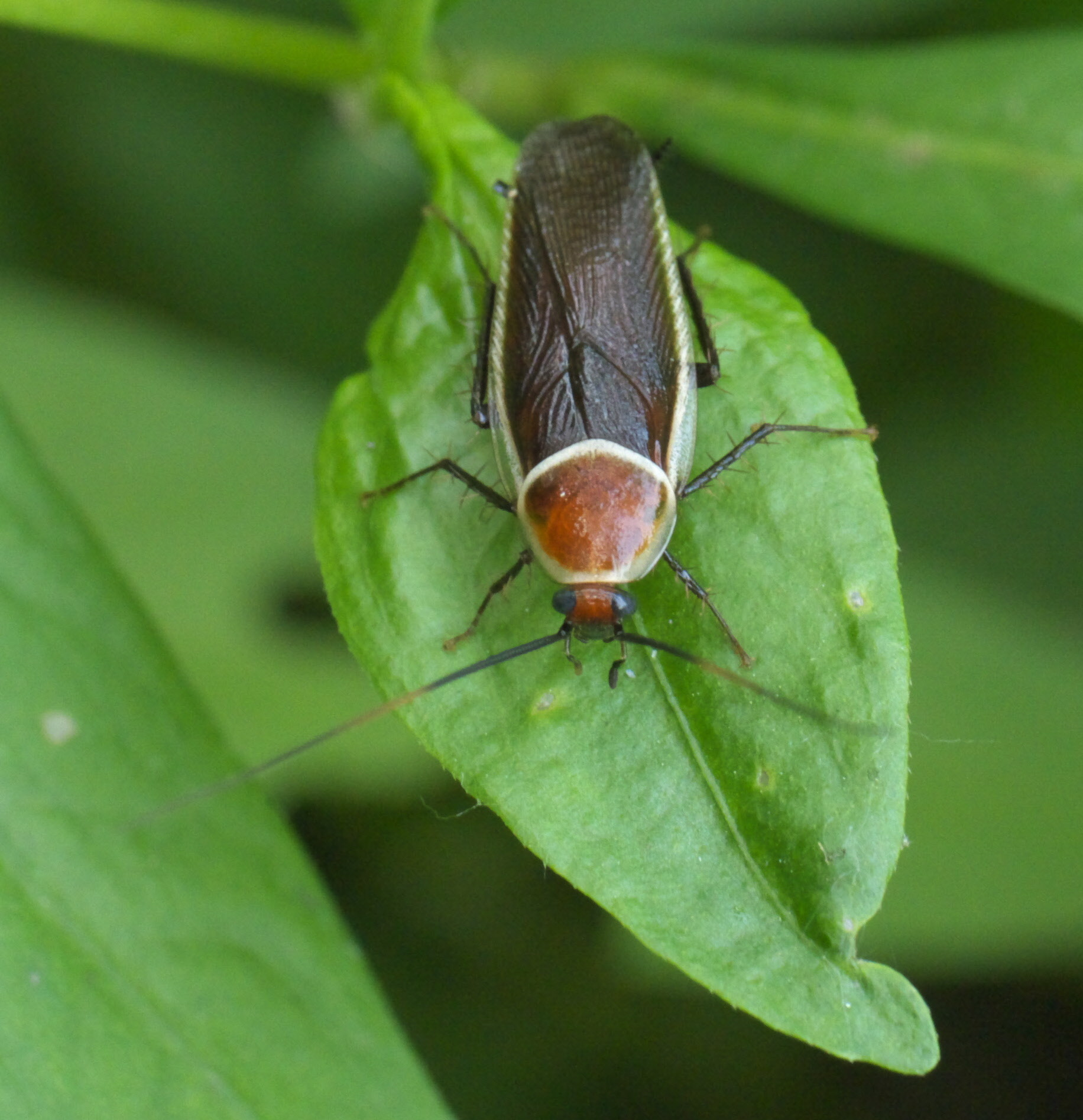

Scientific classification
- Kingdom: Animalia
- Phylum: Arthropoda
- Clade: Pancrustacea
- Class: Insecta
- Order: Blattodea
- Family: Ectobiidae
- Genus: Pseudomops
- Species: P. septentrionalis

Binomial name
- Pseudomops septentrionalis Hebard, 1917

= Pseudomops septentrionalis =

Species of cockroach

Pseudomops septentrionalis, the pale bordered field cockroach or firefly roach, is a species of cockroach in the family Ectobiidae. It is found in Central America and North America.

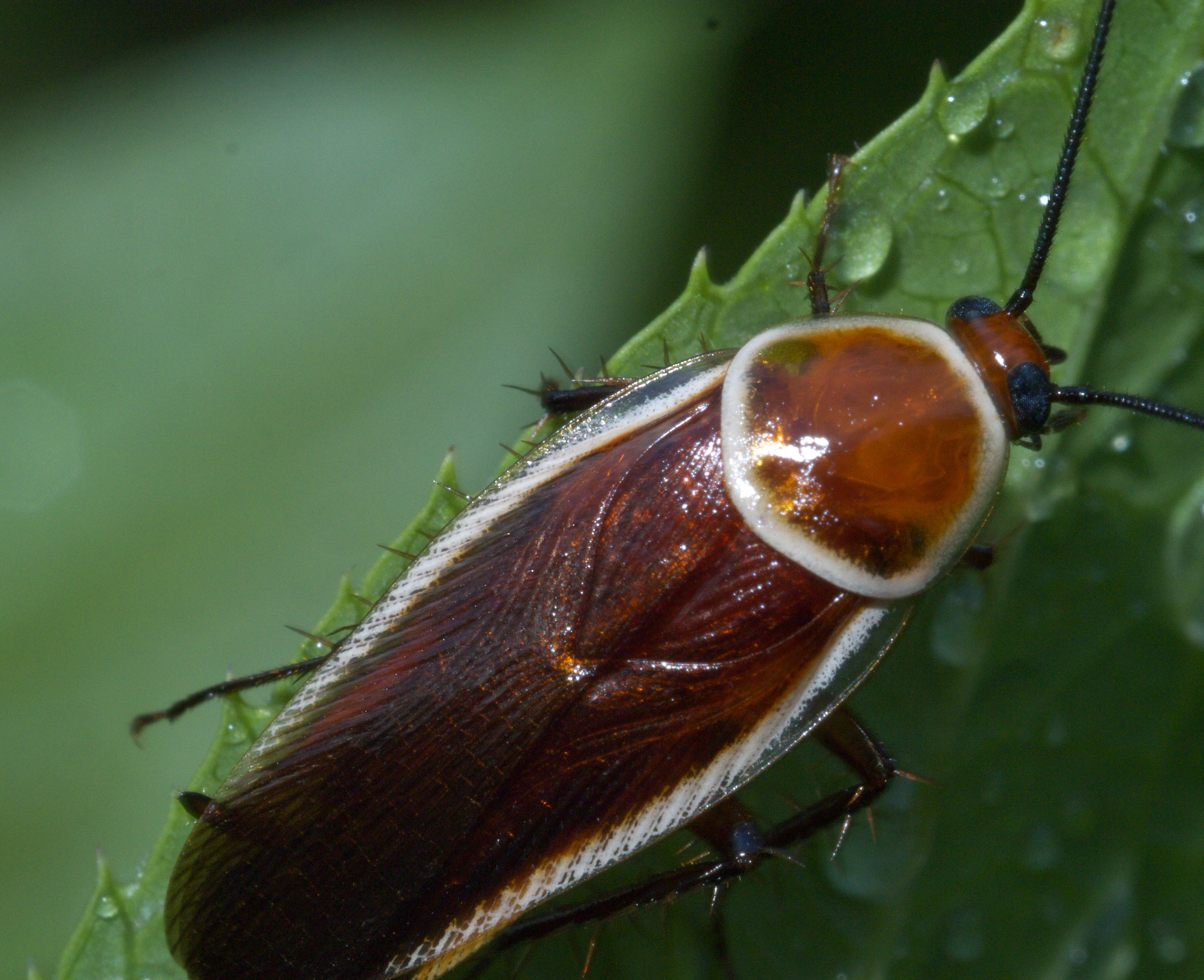
Pale bordered field cockroach, Pseudomops septentrionalis
