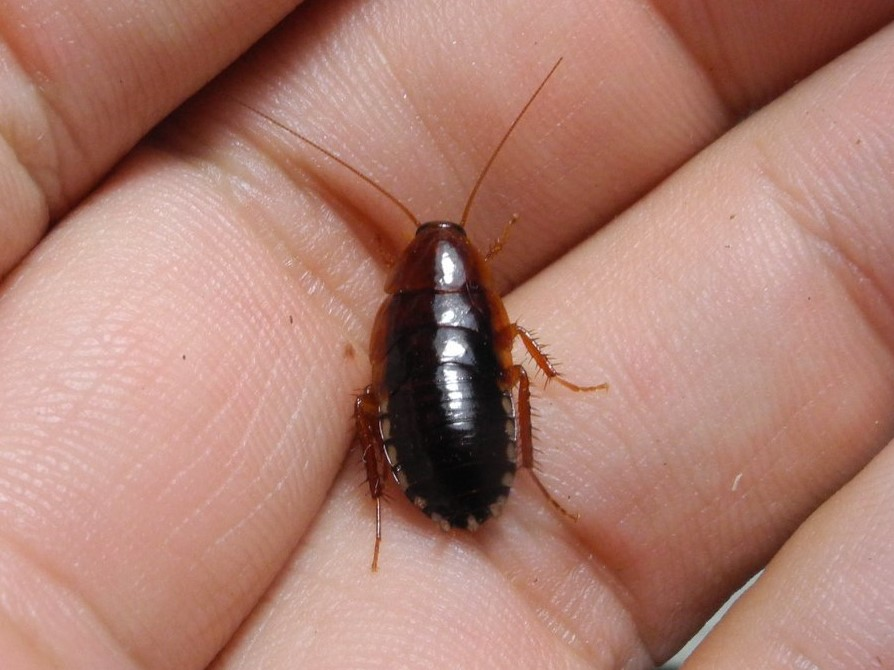

Scientific classification
- Kingdom: Animalia
- Phylum: Arthropoda
- Clade: Pancrustacea
- Class: Insecta
- Order: Blattodea
- Family: Ectobiidae
- Genus: Symploce
- Species: S. morsei

Binomial name
- Symploce morsei Hebard, 1916

= Symploce morsei =

Species of cockroach

Symploce morsei is a species of cockroach in the family Ectobiidae. It is found in North America and the Caribbean.
