= Lobopterella =

Scientific classification
- Kingdom: Animalia
- Phylum: Arthropoda
- Clade: Pancrustacea
- Class: Insecta
- Order: Blattodea
- Family: Ectobiidae
- Subfamily: Blattellinae
- Genus: Lobopterella; Princis, 1957

Genus of cockroaches

Lobopterella is a genus of cockroaches in the family Ectobiidae.

== Taxonomy ==
Lobopterella contains the following species:

- Lobopterella pallipes
- Lobopterella princisi
- Lobopterella dimidiatipes
