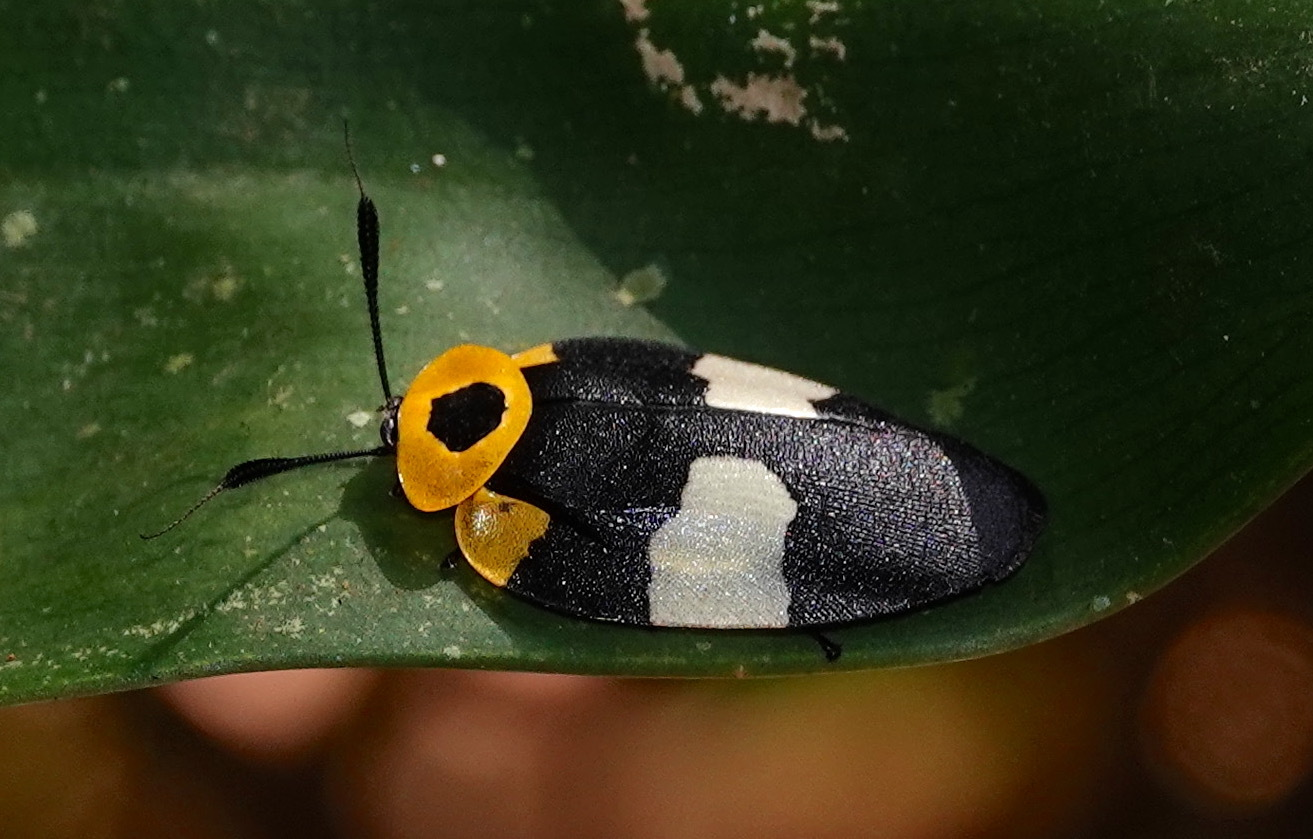

Scientific classification
- Kingdom: Animalia
- Phylum: Arthropoda
- Clade: Pancrustacea
- Class: Insecta
- Order: Blattodea
- Family: Ectobiidae
- Genus: Eushelfordia
- Species: E. pica

Binomial name
- Eushelfordia pica (Walker, 1868)

= Eushelfordia pica =

Species of cockroach

Eushelfordia pica is a species of cockroach in the family Ectobiidae. It is native to forests in the western Amazon basin in Ecuador, Peru and Brazil.
