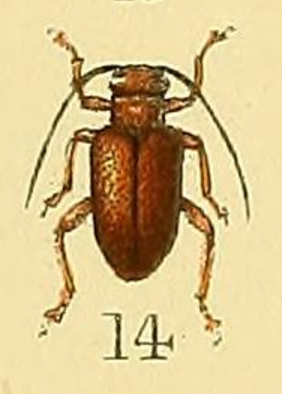
- Entelopes shelfordi

Scientific classification
- Kingdom: Animalia
- Phylum: Arthropoda
- Clade: Pancrustacea
- Class: Insecta
- Order: Coleoptera
- Suborder: Polyphaga
- Infraorder: Cucujiformia
- Family: Cerambycidae
- Tribe: Saperdini
- Genus: Entelopes; Guérin-Méneville, 1844

Type species
- Entelopes glauca Guérin-Méneville, 1844

= Entelopes =

Genus of beetles

Entelopes is a genus of longhorn beetles of the subfamily Lamiinae, containing the following species:

subgenus Aspineoentelops Hua, 1990

- Entelopes longzhouensis Hua, 1990

subgenus Entelopes

- Entelopes glauca Guérin-Méneville, 1844
- Entelopes nigritarsis Breuning, 1968
- Entelopes similis Pascoe, 1866
- Entelopes subsimilis Breuning, 1968

subgenus Mustafaia Özdikmen, 2008 (nomen novum for Shelfordia Breuning, 1954)

- Entelopes fuscotarsalis Breuning, 1954
- Entelopes shelfordi Aurivillius, 1923

subgenus Wallaceentelopes Breuning, 1954

- Entelopes griseipennis Breuning, 1954
- Entelopes wallacei Pascoe, 1856
