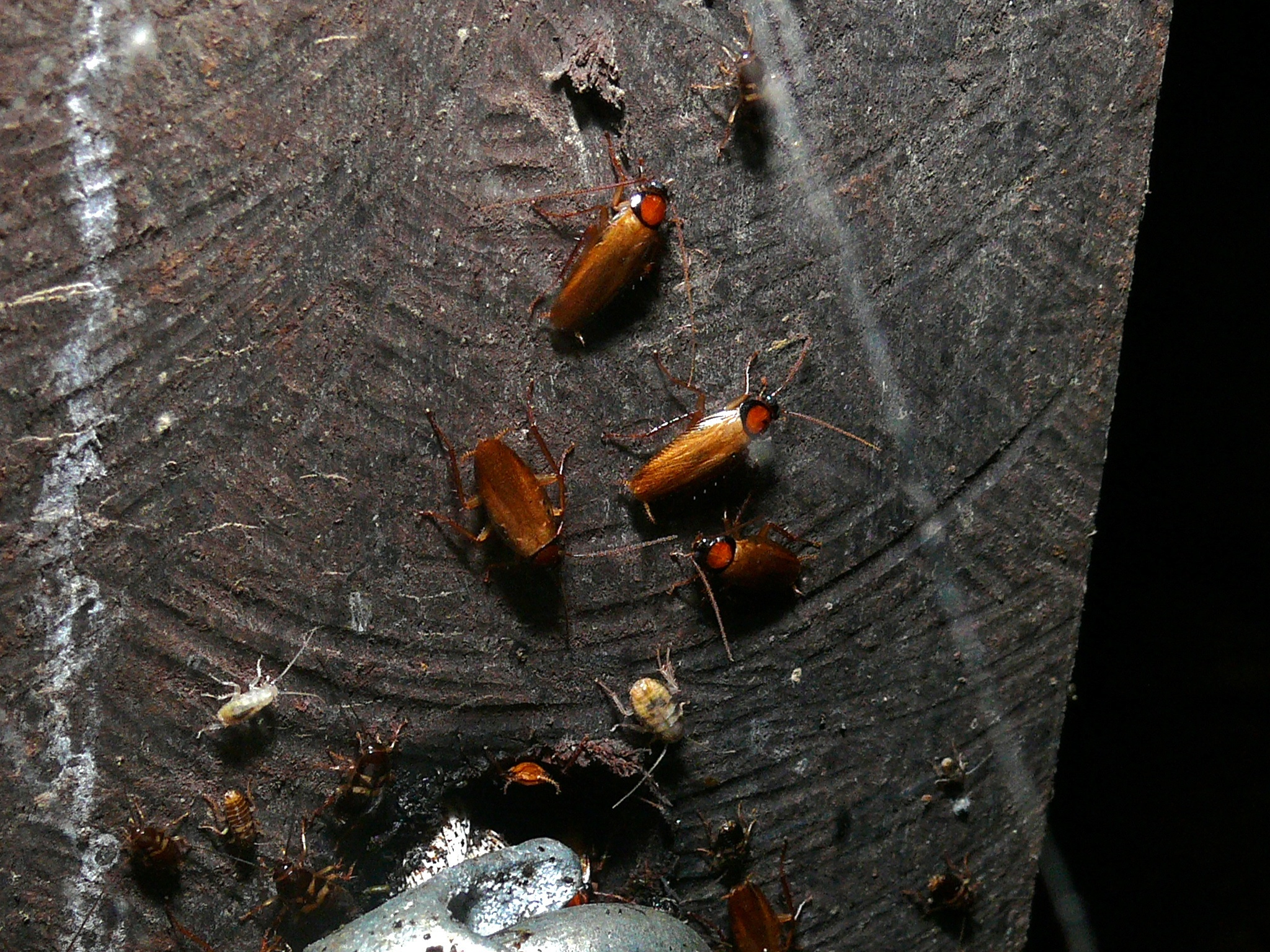
- Symploce cavernicola

Scientific classification
- Kingdom: Animalia
- Phylum: Arthropoda
- Clade: Pancrustacea
- Class: Insecta
- Order: Blattodea
- Family: Ectobiidae
- Subfamily: Blattellinae
- Genus: Symploce; Hebard, 1916

= Symploce (insect) =

Genus of cockroaches

Symploce is a genus of cockroach in the family Ectobiidae.

== Species ==
These 66 species belong to the genus Symploce:

- Symploce armigera Princis, 1962^{c g}
- Symploce bicolor (Palisot De Beauvois, 1805)^{c g}
- Symploce bidiensis Roth, L. M., 1985^{c g}
- Symploce bifida Princis, 1962^{c g}
- Symploce bispot Feng & Woo, 1988^{g}
- Symploce bispota Woo & P. Feng, 1988^{c g}
- Symploce breviramis (Hanitsch, 1929)^{c g}
- Symploce cristata Rehn, J. A. G. & Hebard, 1927^{c g}
- Symploce digitifera Rehn, J. A. G., 1922^{c g}
- Symploce disema Hebard, 1929^{c g}
- Symploce divisa Princis, 1963^{c g}
- Symploce flagellata Hebard, 1916^{c g}
- Symploce furcata (Shiraki, 1931)^{c g}
- Symploce gigas Asahina, 1979^{c g}
- Symploce hebardi Princis, 1969^{c g}
- Symploce incerta (Hanitsch, 1929)^{c g}
- Symploce incuriosa (Saussure, 1899)^{c g}
- Symploce indica (Brunner von Wattenwyl, 1865)^{c g}
- Symploce jamaicana (Rehn, J. A. G., 1903)^{c g}
- Symploce japonica (Shelford, 1907)^{c g}
- Symploce jariverensis Roth, L. M., 1986^{c g}
- Symploce javana Hebard, 1929^{c g}
- Symploce kanemensis Roth, L. M., 1987^{c g}
- Symploce kenyensis Chopard, 1938^{c g}
- Symploce kibalituriensis Roth, L. M., 1986^{c g}
- Symploce kumari Roth, L. M., 1986^{c g}
- Symploce larvata (Hanitsch, 1929)^{c g}
- Symploce lunaris (Shelford, 1911)^{c g}
- Symploce lundi Roth, L. M., 1987^{c g}
- Symploce macroptera (Walker, F., 1868)^{c g}
- Symploce marshallae Kumar, 1975^{c g}
- Symploce microphthalma Izquierdo & Medina, 1992^{c g}
- Symploce miyakoensis Asahina, 1974^{c g}
- Symploce modesta (Brunner von Wattenwyl, 1893)^{c g}
- Symploce morsei Hebard, 1916^{i c g b}
- Symploce munda Gurney, 1942^{c g}
- Symploce natalensis (Walker, F., 1868)^{c g}
- Symploce nigroalba (Hanitsch, 1927)^{c g}
- Symploce okinoerabuensis Asahina, 1974^{c g}
- Symploce pallens (Stephens, 1835)^{i c g}
- Symploce paralarvata Roth, L. M., 1985^{c g}
- Symploce pararuficollis Roth, L. M., 1994^{c g}
- Symploce perpulchra (Shelford, 1907)^{c g}
- Symploce quadrispinis Woo & P. Feng, 1992^{c g}
- Symploce relucens (Gerstaecker, 1883)^{c g}
- Symploce royi Princis, 1963^{c g}
- Symploce ruficollis (Fabricius, 1787)^{c g}
- Symploce sikorae (Saussure, 1891)^{c g}
- Symploce singaporensis Roth, L. M., 1985^{c g}
- Symploce somaliensis Roth, L. M., 1986^{c g}
- Symploce stellatus Feng, P. & Woo, 1999^{c g}
- Symploce striata (Shiraki, 1906)^{c g}
- Symploce strinatii Roth, L. M., 1988^{c g}
- Symploce stupida Roth, L. M., 1999^{c g}
- Symploce sudanica Rehn, J. A. G., 1926^{c g}
- Symploce termitina (Saussure, 1863)^{c g}
- Symploce testacea (Shiraki, 1908)^{c g}
- Symploce togoana Roth, L. M., 1987^{c g}
- Symploce torchaceus Feng, P. & Woo, 1999^{c g}
- Symploce transita Bei-Bienko, 1964^{c g}
- Symploce triangulifera Princis, 1963^{c g}
- Symploce unistyla Roth, L. M., 1985^{c g}
- Symploce walkeri Princis, 1969^{c g}
- Symploce wulingensis Feng, P. & Woo, 1993^{c g}
- Symploce yayeyamana Asahina, 1979^{c g}
- Symploce zarudniana Bei-Bienko, 1950^{c g}

Data sources: i = ITIS, c = Catalogue of Life, g = GBIF, b = Bugguide.net
