= Entelopes glauca =

Scientific classification
- Kingdom: Animalia
- Phylum: Arthropoda
- Clade: Pancrustacea
- Class: Insecta
- Order: Coleoptera
- Suborder: Polyphaga
- Infraorder: Cucujiformia
- Family: Cerambycidae
- Genus: Entelopes
- Species: E. glauca

Binomial name
- Entelopes glauca Guérin-Méneville, 1844

Synonyms
- Entelopes ionoptera Pascoe, 1857; Entelopes nigroreducta Breuning, 1954; Entelopes jonoptera Pascoe, 1857

Species of beetle

Entelopes glauca is a species of beetle in the family Cerambycidae. It was described by Félix Édouard Guérin-Méneville in 1844. It is known to be found in Malaysia, Sumatra, Java and Borneo.

== Subspecies ==
- Entelopes glauca glauca Guérin-Méneville, 1844
- Entelopes glauca sumatrana Breuning, 1950
