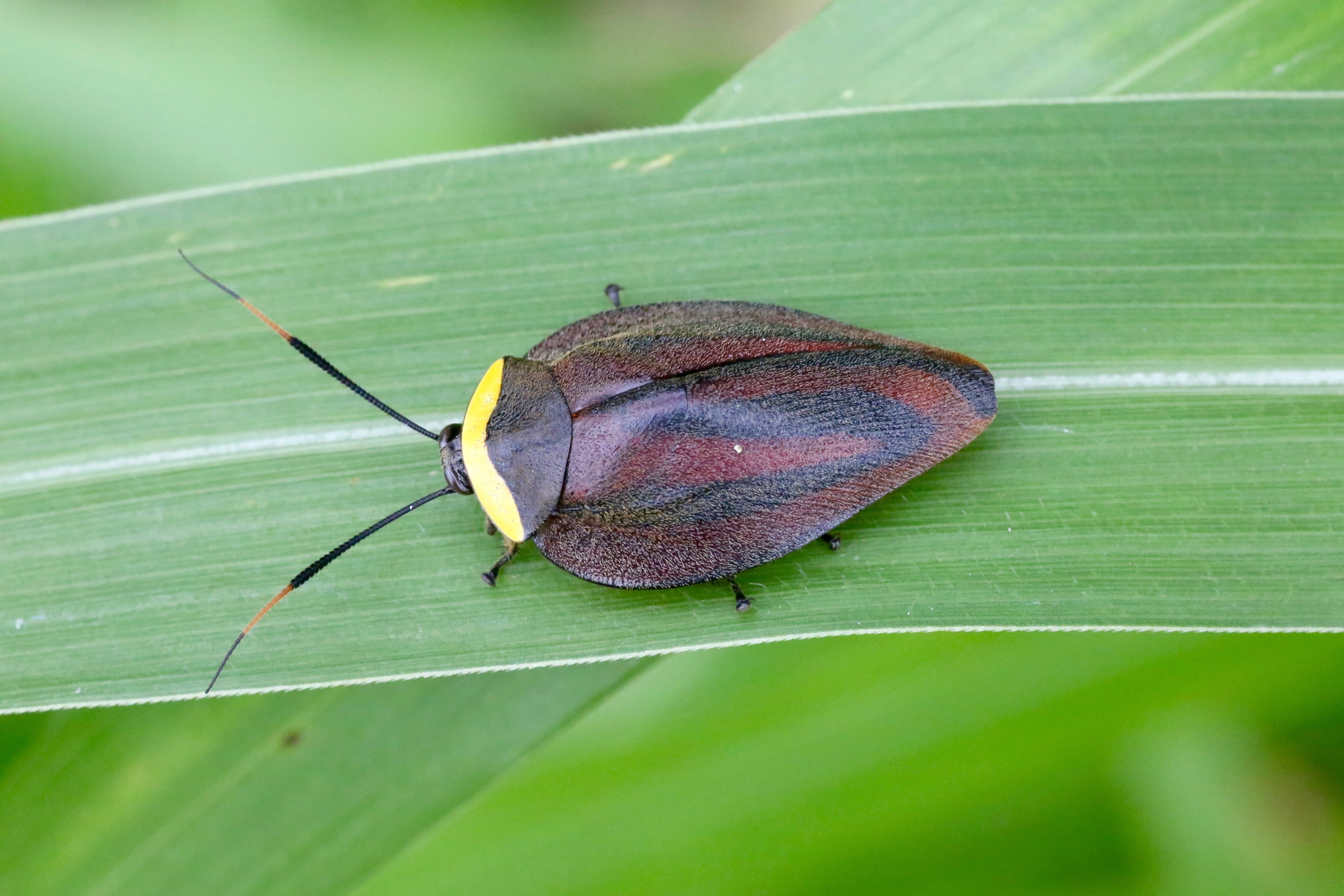
- Paratropes aequatorialis

Scientific classification
- Kingdom: Animalia
- Phylum: Arthropoda
- Clade: Pancrustacea
- Class: Insecta
- Order: Blattodea
- Family: Ectobiidae
- Subfamily: Nyctiborinae
- Genus: Paratropes; Serville, 1838

= Paratropes =

Genus of cockroaches

Paratropes is a genus of cockroaches within the family Ectobiidae. There are currently 14 species assigned to the genus. Members of this genus are distributed across North and South America in countries such as Mexico, Colombia, Panama and Peru.

== Species ==
- Paratropes aequatorialis Saussure, 1864
- Paratropes bilunata (Saussure & Zehntner, 1893)
- Paratropes biolleyi (Saussure & Zehntner, 1893)
- Paratropes elegans (Burmeister, 1838)
- † Paratropes fossilis Vršanský & Anisyutkin, 2008
- Paratropes heydeniana Saussure, 1864
- Paratropes lateralis (Eschscholtz, 1822)
- Paratropes lycoides Serville, 1838
- Paratropes metae Hebard, 1921
- Paratropes mexicana Brunner von Wattenwyl, 1865
- Paratropes otunensis Salazar, 2004
- Paratropes pensa Rehn, 1928
- Paratropes phalerata (Erichson, 1848)
- Paratropes seabrai Rocha e Silva & Aguiar, 1978
