= Entelopes fuscotarsalis =

Scientific classification
- Kingdom: Animalia
- Phylum: Arthropoda
- Class: Insecta
- Order: Coleoptera
- Suborder: Polyphaga
- Infraorder: Cucujiformia
- Family: Cerambycidae
- Genus: Entelopes
- Species: E. fuscotarsalis

Binomial name
- Entelopes fuscotarsalis Breuning, 1954

Species of beetle

Entelopes fuscotarsalis is a species of beetle in the family Cerambycidae. It was described by Stephan von Breuning in 1954. It is known from Borneo.
