= Entelopes nigritarsis =

Scientific classification
- Kingdom: Animalia
- Phylum: Arthropoda
- Class: Insecta
- Order: Coleoptera
- Suborder: Polyphaga
- Infraorder: Cucujiformia
- Family: Cerambycidae
- Genus: Entelopes
- Species: E. nigritarsis

Binomial name
- Entelopes nigritarsis Breuning, 1968

Species of beetle

Entelopes nigritarsis is a species of beetle in the family Cerambycidae. It was described by Stephan von Breuning in 1968.
