= Duryodana =

Scientific classification
- Kingdom: Animalia
- Phylum: Arthropoda
- Clade: Pancrustacea
- Class: Insecta
- Order: Blattodea
- Family: Ectobiidae
- Genus: Duryodana; Kirby, 1903
- Species: D. palpalis

Binomial name
- Duryodana palpalis (Walker, 1868)

Genus of cockroaches

Duryodana is a genus of cockroaches in the family Ectobiidae, erected by William Forsell Kirby in 1903. It contains the single species Duryodana palpalis (Walker, 1868) from Borneo and Sumatra.
