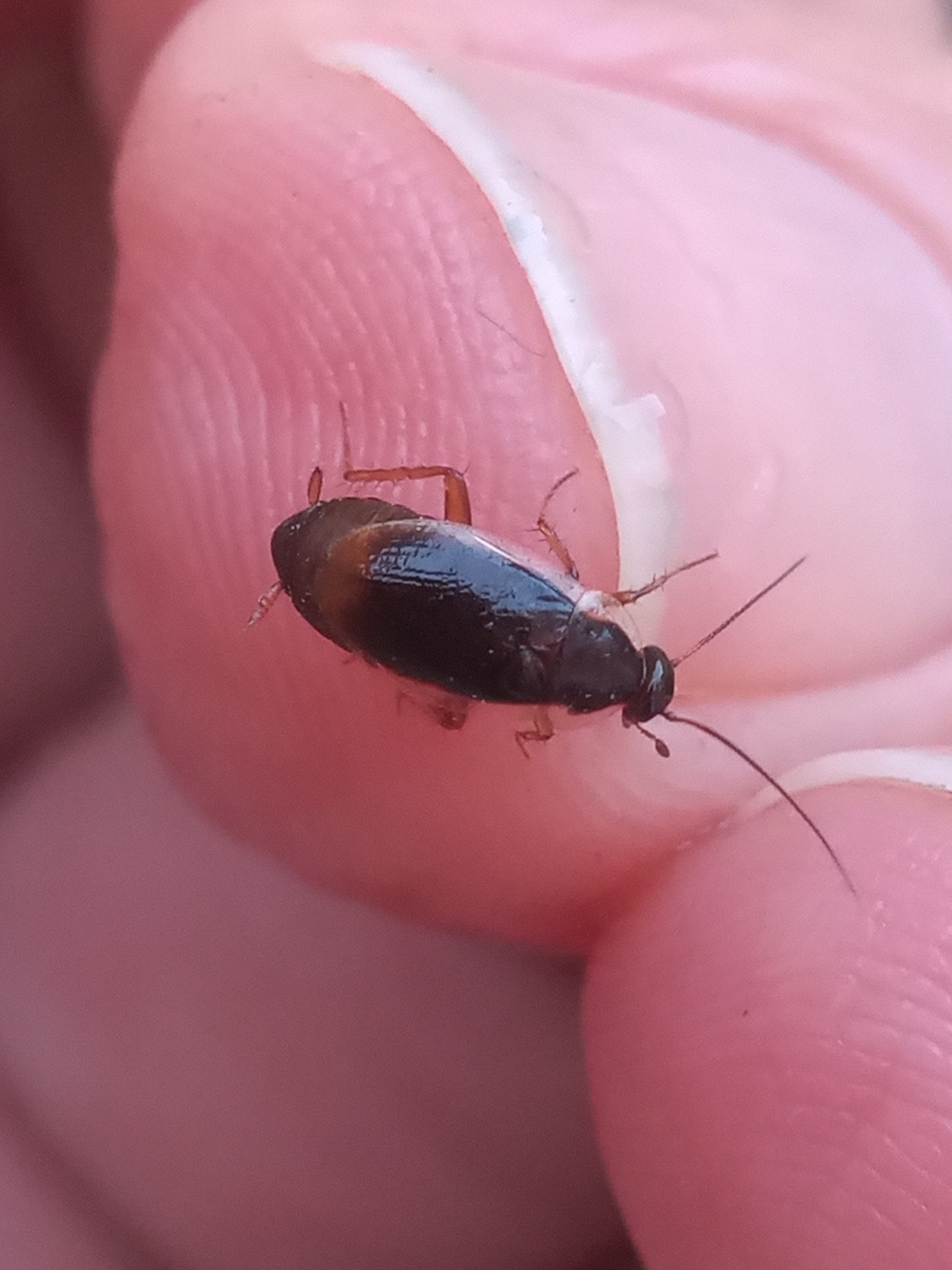
- Anaplecta fallax

Scientific classification
- Kingdom: Animalia
- Phylum: Arthropoda
- Clade: Pancrustacea
- Class: Insecta
- Order: Blattodea
- Family: Anaplectidae
- Genus: Anaplecta; Saussure, 1862

Species
- See text

= Anaplecta =

Genus of cockroaches

Anaplecta is a genus in the family Anaplectidae. There are at least 20 described species in Anaplecta.

== Species ==
- Anaplecta alaris Saussure & Zehntner, 1893
- Anaplecta alvarengaia Rocha e Silva, 1974
- Anaplecta analisignata Rehn, 1916
- Anaplecta anncajanoae Lucañas, 2016
- Anaplecta arcuata Deng & Che, 2020
- Anaplecta arisanica Shiraki, 1931
- Anaplecta asema Hebard, 1920
- Anaplecta australiensis Roth, 1990
- Anaplecta avicharapura Fernando, 1957
- Anaplecta azteca Saussure, 1868
- Anaplecta balachowskyi Bonfils, 1975
- Anaplecta basalis Bey-Bienko, 1969
- Anaplecta bella Rocha e Silva, 1954
- Anaplecta biafrae Shelford, 1909
- Anaplecta bicolor Deng & Che, 2020
- Anaplecta bivittata Brunner von Wattenwyl, 1865
- Anaplecta bolivari Shelford, 1909
- Anaplecta brachyptera Roth, 1990
- Anaplecta brunneri Shelford, 1906
- Anaplecta cabimae Hebard, 1920
- Anaplecta calosoma Shelford, 1912
- Anaplecta carioca Rocha e Silva, 1954
- Anaplecta catharinensis Rocha e Silva, 1971
- Anaplecta cincta Gerstaecker, 1883
- Anaplecta conradti Shelford, 1908
- Anaplecta cornea Hanitsch, 1925
- Anaplecta corneola Deng & Che, 2020
- Anaplecta cruciata Deng & Che, 2020
- Anaplecta dahomensis Shelford, 1906
- Anaplecta dohrniana Saussure & Zehntner, 1893
- Anaplecta domestica Saussure & Zehntner, 1893
- Anaplecta elliptica Saussure & Zehntner, 1893
- Anaplecta erythronota Shelford, 1908
- Anaplecta falcifer Hebard, 1925
- Anaplecta fallax Saussure, 1862
- Anaplecta fulva Brunner von Wattenwyl, 1893
- Anaplecta furcata Deng & Che, 2020
- Anaplecta fusca Shelford, 1906
- Anaplecta galathea Fernando, 1957
- Anaplecta grandipennis Saussure & Zehntner, 1893
- Anaplecta guamina Hebard, 1929
- Anaplecta guianae Bruijning, 1959
- Anaplecta gyrinoides (Walker, 1868)
- Anaplecta hemiscotia Hebard, 1920
- Anaplecta hileia Rocha e Silva & Aguiar, 1977
- Anaplecta humeralis Hanitsch, 1933
- Anaplecta ikonnikovi Shelford, 1913
- Anaplecta intermedia Rocha e Silva, 1966
- Anaplecta japonica Asahina, 1977
- Anaplecta jari Rocha e Silva, 1966
- Anaplecta javanica Saussure, 1895
- Anaplecta karakoush Fernando, 1957
- Anaplecta kekilla Fernando, 1959
- Anaplecta lamottei Princis, 1963
- Anaplecta lateralis Burmeister, 1838
- Anaplecta lepesmei Chopard, 1945
- Anaplecta maculata Shelford, 1906
- Anaplecta maculifera Hanitsch, 1925
- Anaplecta major Saussure & Zehntner, 1893
- Anaplecta malayensis Shelford, 1906
- Anaplecta maronensis Hebard, 1921
- Anaplecta marshallae Fernando, 1960
- Anaplecta mexicana Saussure, 1868
- Anaplecta minutissima (De Geer, 1773)
- Anaplecta mirabilis Rocha e Silva, 1971
- Anaplecta moxa Saussure & Zehntner, 1893
- Anaplecta nahua Saussure, 1868
- Anaplecta nigra Deng & Che, 2020
- Anaplecta obscura Shelford, 1906
- Anaplecta ochronotum Hebard, 1929
- Anaplecta omei Bey-Bienko, 1958
- Anaplecta otomia Saussure, 1869
- Anaplecta pallida Bolívar, 1881
- Anaplecta parviceps (Walker, 1868)
- Anaplecta pauliani Chopard, 1945
- Anaplecta pavida Shelford, 1906
- Anaplecta peruviana Saussure & Zehntner, 1893
- Anaplecta pluto Hebard, 1926
- Anaplecta poecila Hebard, 1926
- Anaplecta pulchella Rehn, 1906
- Anaplecta pulchra Shelford, 1906
- Anaplecta pumila (Stål, 1860)
- Anaplecta pygmaea Bruijning, 1959
- Anaplecta ratnadvipa Fernando, 1957
- Anaplecta rendata Rocha e Silva & Lopes, 1977
- Anaplecta replicata Saussure & Zehntner, 1893
- Anaplecta saussurei Hebard, 1921
- Anaplecta simplex Shiraki, 1931
- Anaplecta srilanka Fernando, 1957
- Anaplecta staminiformis Deng & Che, 2020
- Anaplecta strigata Deng & Che, 2020
- Anaplecta subsignata Hebard, 1926
- Anaplecta suffusa Hebard, 1926
- Anaplecta sumatrensis Hanitsch, 1929
- Anaplecta tolteca Saussure, 1868
- Anaplecta transversa Hanitsch, 1925
- Anaplecta unicolor Burmeister, 1838
- Anaplecta varipennis Shelford, 1906
- Anaplecta vega Barna, 2019
- Anaplecta villiersi Chopard, 1945
- Anaplecta vittata Hanitsch, 1923
- Anaplecta xanthopeltis Hebard, 1921
- Anaplecta zeylanica Shelford, 1906
