= Arbiblatta =

Scientific classification
- Kingdom: Animalia
- Phylum: Arthropoda
- Clade: Pancrustacea
- Class: Insecta
- Order: Blattodea
- Family: Ectobiidae
- Subfamily: Ectobiinae
- Genus: Arbiblatta; Chopard, 1936

Genus of cockroaches

Arbiblatta is a genus of cockroaches within the family Ectobiidae. There are currently 9 species assigned to the genus.

== Species ==
- Arbiblatta abdelazizi (Bolívar, 1908)
- Arbiblatta azruensis (Werner, 1929)
- Arbiblatta chavesi (Bolívar, 1898)
- Arbiblatta haffidi (Bolívar, 1908)
- Arbiblatta infumata (Brunner von Wattenwyl, 1865)
- Arbiblatta larrinuae (Bolívar, 1881)
- Arbiblatta reticulata (Chopard, 1936)
- Arbiblatta sancta (Werner, 1929)
- Arbiblatta syriaca (Bey-Bienko, 1938)
