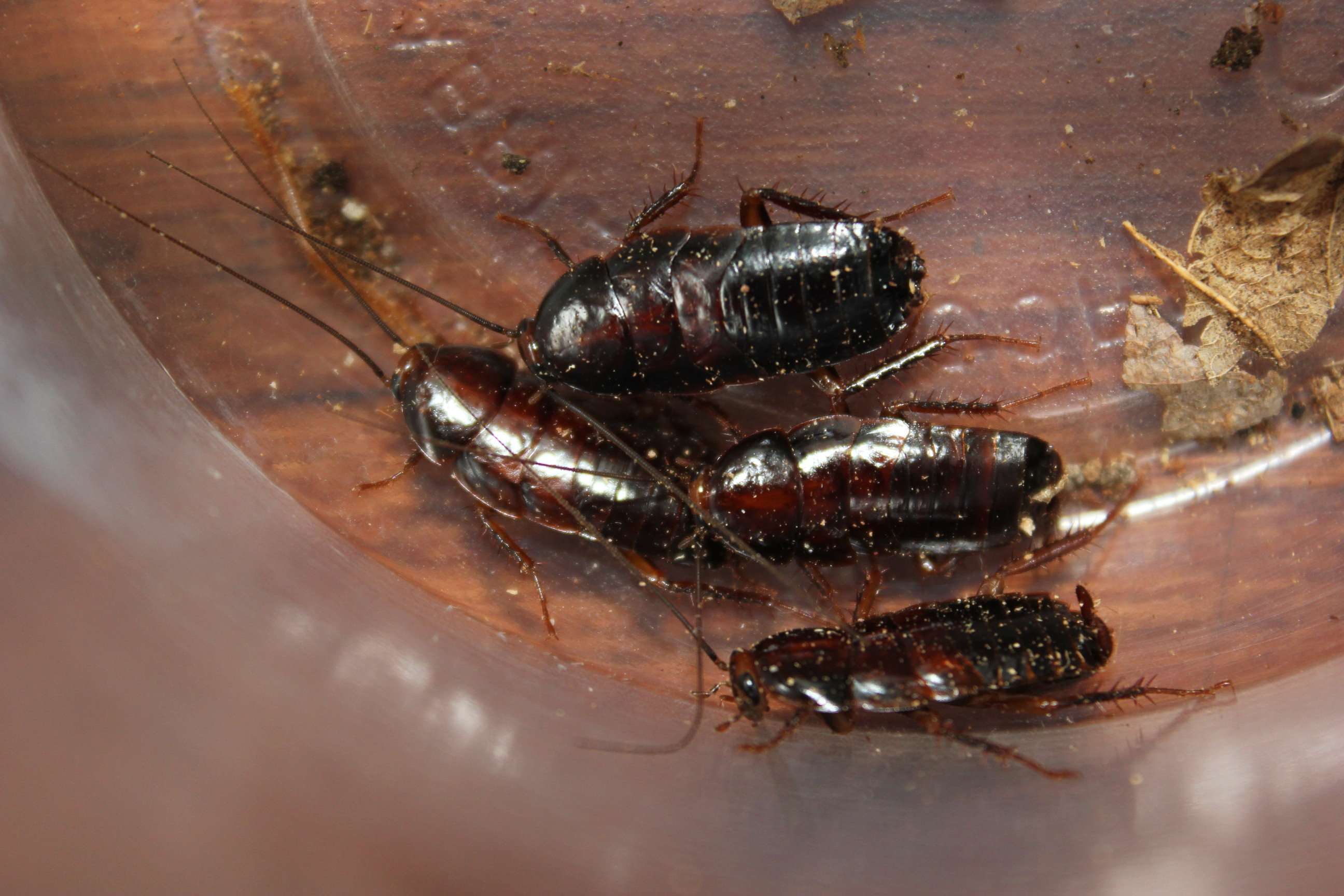
- Parcoblatta pennsylvanica nymphs caught from Wake County, NC

Scientific classification
- Kingdom: Animalia
- Phylum: Arthropoda
- Clade: Pancrustacea
- Class: Insecta
- Order: Blattodea
- Family: Ectobiidae
- Genus: Parcoblatta
- Species: P. pennsylvanica

Binomial name
- Parcoblatta pennsylvanica (De Geer, 1773)

Synonyms
- Parcoblatta pennsylvanica (De Geer, 1773); Blatta cincta Fabricius 1787; Blatta borealis Saussure, 1862; Blatta pennsylvanica De Geer 1773; Ectobia flavocincta Scudder, 1862; Ischnoptera couloniana Saussure 1862; Ischnoptera inaequalis Saussure & Zehntner 1893; Ischnoptera nortoniana Saussure 1862; Ischnoptera translucida Saussure, 1864; Periplaneta curta Walker, F., 1871; Temnopteryx marginata Scudder, 872

= Pennsylvania wood cockroach =

Species of insect

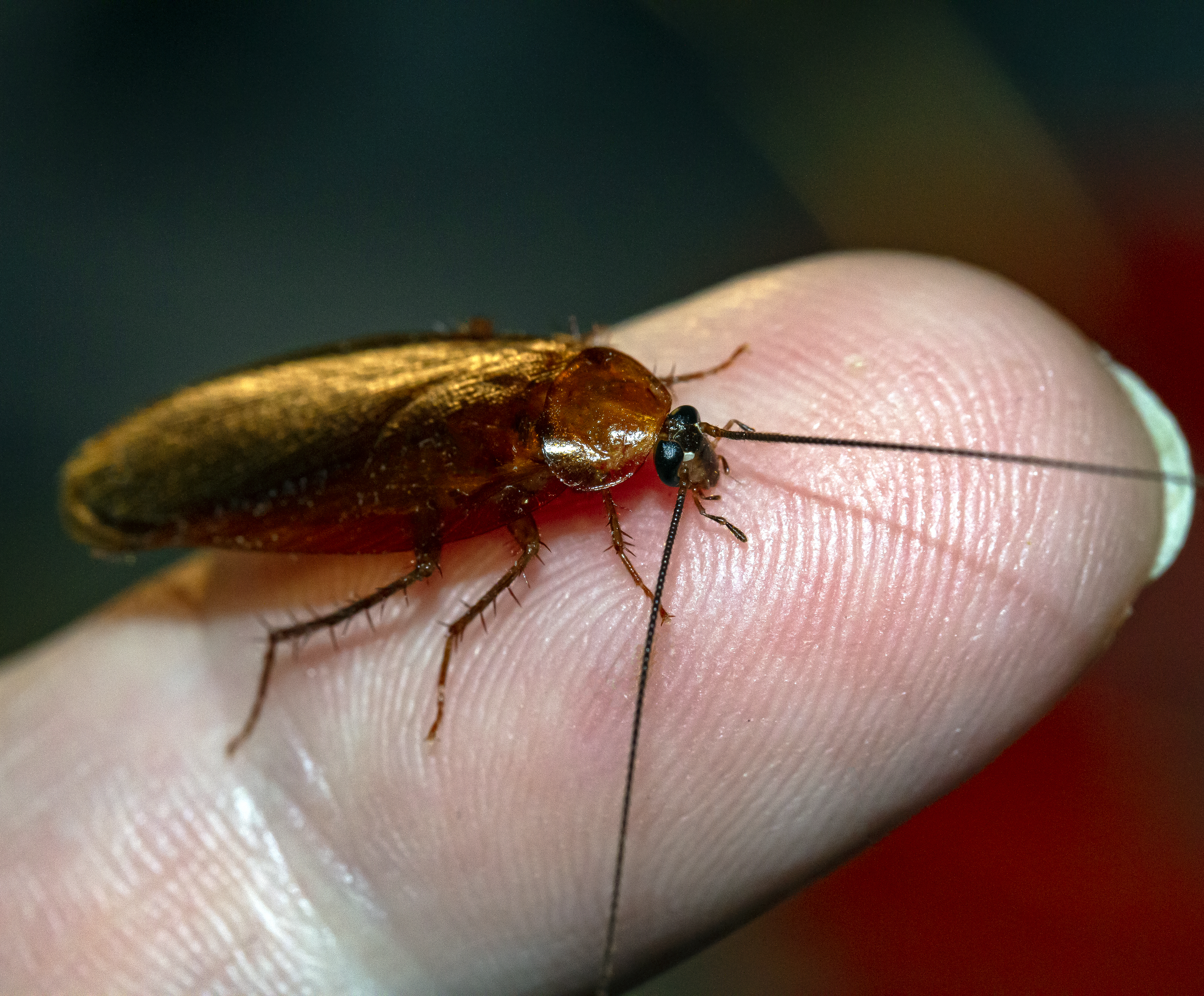
Pennsylvania Wood Cockroach

The Pennsylvania wood cockroach (Parcoblatta pennsylvanica) or Pennsylvanian cockroach is a common species of cockroach in eastern and central North America.

== Description ==
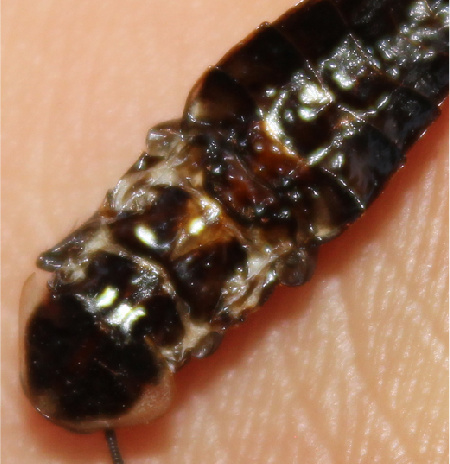
Dead adult male showing the markings on the median segment and first abdominal segment.

Males are dark brown; the sides of the thorax and the front half of the wings are margined with yellow. Adult males are fully winged, while females have conspicuous wing pads (actually short wings like that of the female oriental cockroach), which are functionless. Wings of the male are longer than its body, while wing pads of the female cover only one-third to two-thirds of the abdomen. The males fly swiftly but do not have the ability to sustain themselves in the air for long periods.

	Male	Female
Body length	16.8–24.5 mm (0.66–0.96 in)	12.7–18.0 mm (0.50–0.71 in)
Pronotum length	4.2–5.3 mm (0.17–0.21 in)	4.3–5.8 mm (0.17–0.23 in)
Pronotum width	5.4–6.9 mm (0.21–0.27 in)	5.1–7.2 mm (0.20–0.28 in)
Tegmina length	17.3–25.1 mm (0.68–0.99 in)	6.4–13.9 mm (0.25–0.55 in)
Tegmina width	5.4–7.7 mm (0.21–0.30 in)	4.2–5.7 mm (0.17–0.22 in)

== Habitat and ecology ==
The species occurs in open, timbered areas with little ground cover. According to entomologist Fred A. Lawson, it is "often seen on tree trunks and lower branches of oaks and elms after dark." Nymphs and adults are also found outdoors beneath loose bark in woodpiles, stumps, and hollow trees. Brought indoors on infested firewood, they wander about the house without congregating in any particular room. They can be especially troublesome during the mating season, which is during May and June. Male wood cockroaches frequently travel in large numbers and fly considerable distances. They are attracted to lights at night and may gain entry indoors. Large numbers may also be found in rain gutters of homes.

Pennsylvania wood cockroaches feed primarily on decaying organic matter. Both female and male Pennsylvania wood cockroaches have been found under shingles and on the inside of garages. They rarely breed indoors. However, with the growing use of firewood, the popularity of cedar shake shingles, and the continual building of homes in wooded areas, problems with Pennsylvania wood cockroaches will probably escalate.

== Reproduction ==
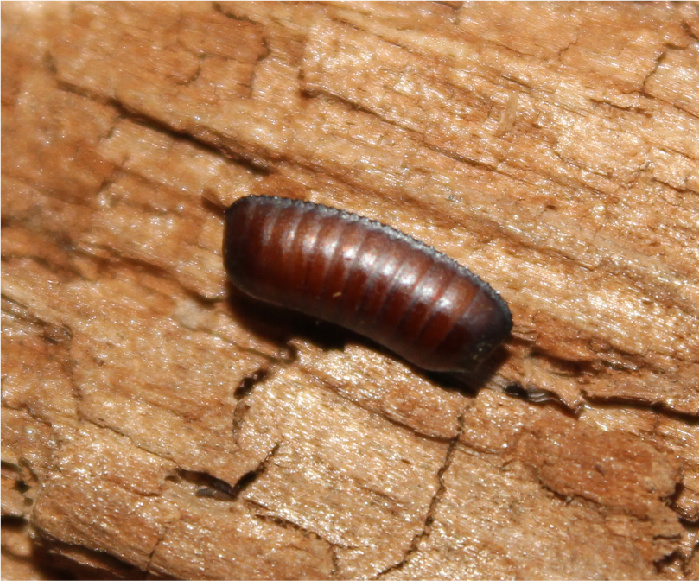
Ootheca (egg case)

The Pennsylvania wood cockroach has three developmental stages: egg, nymph, and adult. Eggs are laid in egg capsules, produced during the warm months and deposited behind the loose bark of dead trees, fallen logs, or stumps. Egg capsules are yellowish brown and characteristically curved on both sides like a half moon. Capsules are twice as long as wide, each containing up to 32 eggs. The egg stage lasts about 34 days at 80 °F, while the nymphal stage typically lasts 10 to 12 months but can last up to 2 years. The normal life span of the female adult is several months.

== Distribution ==
The distribution of the species includes southeastern Canada, in the provinces of Ontario and Quebec, and the eastern and central United States, in Alabama, the District of Columbia, probably Florida, Delaware, Georgia, Virginia, Illinois, Indiana, Iowa, Kansas, Kentucky, Louisiana, Massachusetts, Maine, Maryland, Michigan, Minnesota, Mississippi, Missouri, Nebraska, New Jersey, New York, North Carolina, Ohio, Oklahoma, Pennsylvania, South Dakota, Tennessee, Texas, and Wisconsin.

A 1966 article said that it is the only species of cockroach that is definitely native to Ontario, while a 1987 update also included Parcoblatta virginica and Parcoblatta uhleriana as indigenous to the province.

== Structural and environmental modifications and repairs ==
Pennsylvania wood cockroaches are most often carried into homes under the bark of firewood. It is best to not store firewood inside the house. Move woodpiles away from the house to further reduce the likelihood of cockroaches wandering in.

Houses located within woods will sometimes have wood cockroaches crawl under siding; especially homes with cedar shake shingles. To cockroaches, the house may represent a fallen tree and a new location for nesting. A wide lawn will inhibit cockroaches crawling from the surrounding woods to the house. The use of window screening and caulking to prevent entry is a good structural tactic.

The species frequently invades summer cottages, and while it is considered a nuisance, it is rarely in enough numbers to be considered a pest.

== Chemical control ==
As breeding populations rarely become established indoors, house interiors should not be treated. Treat exteriors only when wood cockroaches enter homes from the surrounding environment.

Exterior treatments to foundations, around doors and windows, porches, patios and other areas where outside lights are located will help control both the adult males (which will fly to the lights) and the females (which crawl to the house in search of harborage).

== Additional images ==
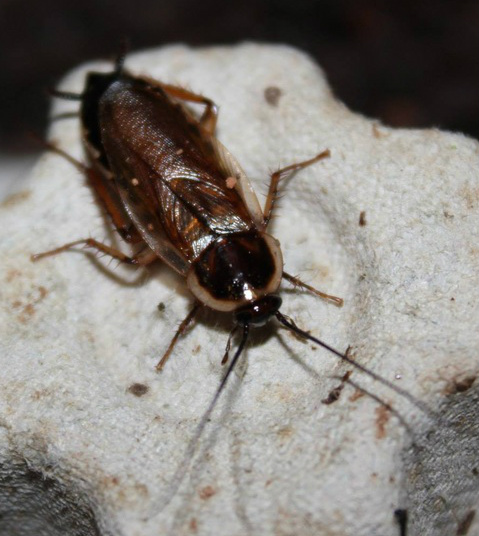
Adult female

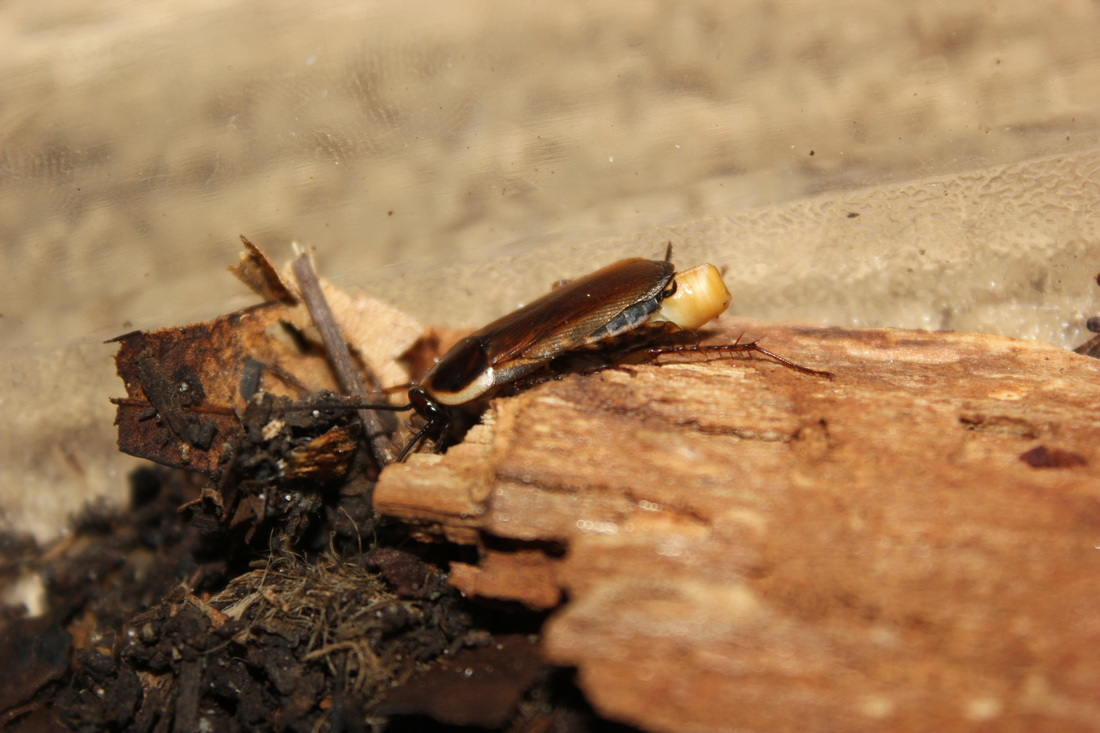
Adult female laying an ootheca. From North Carolina

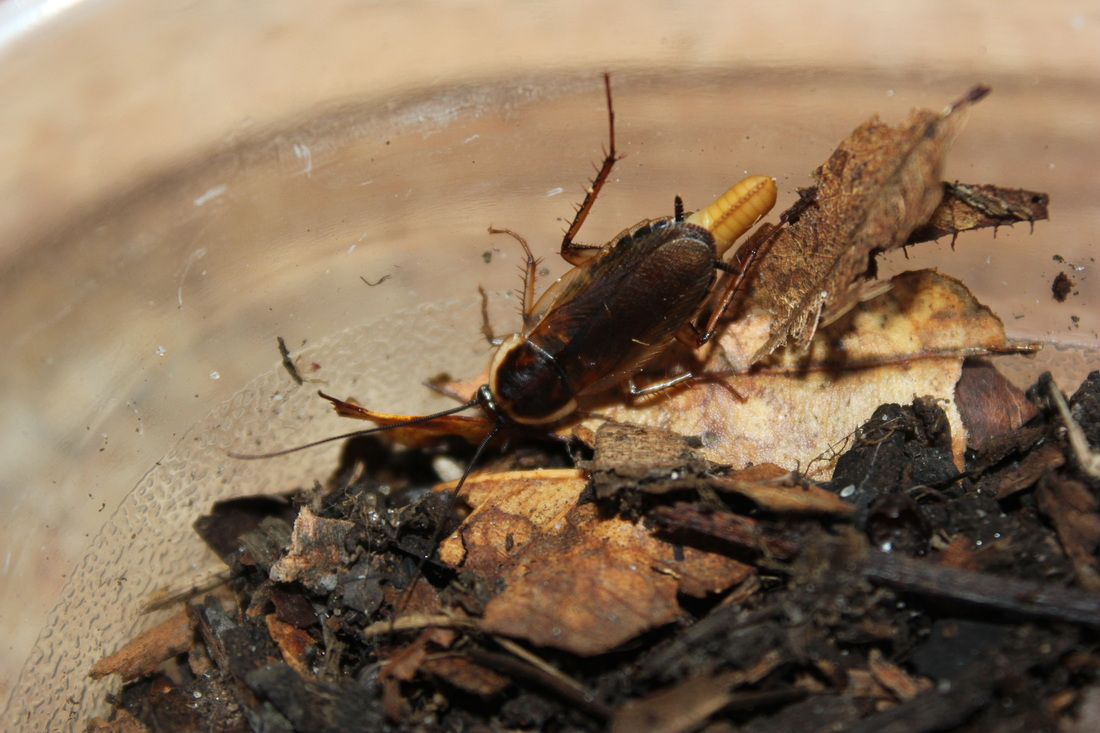
Adult female laying ootheca.

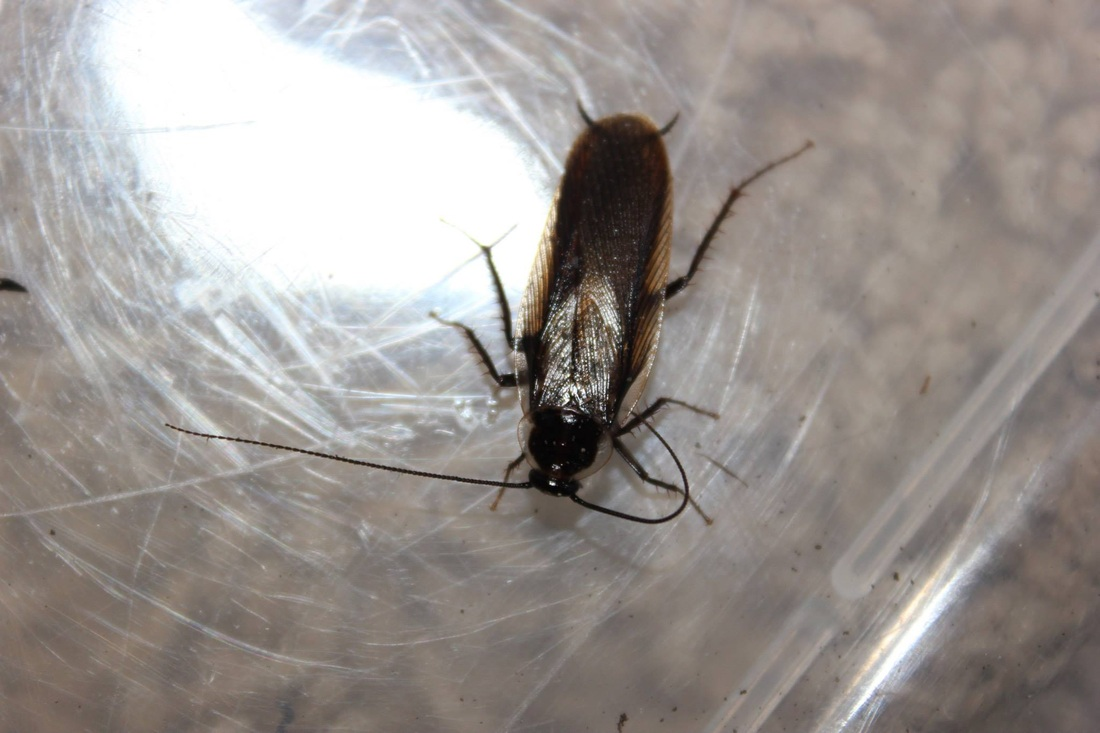
Adult male captured as a nymph from North Carolina.

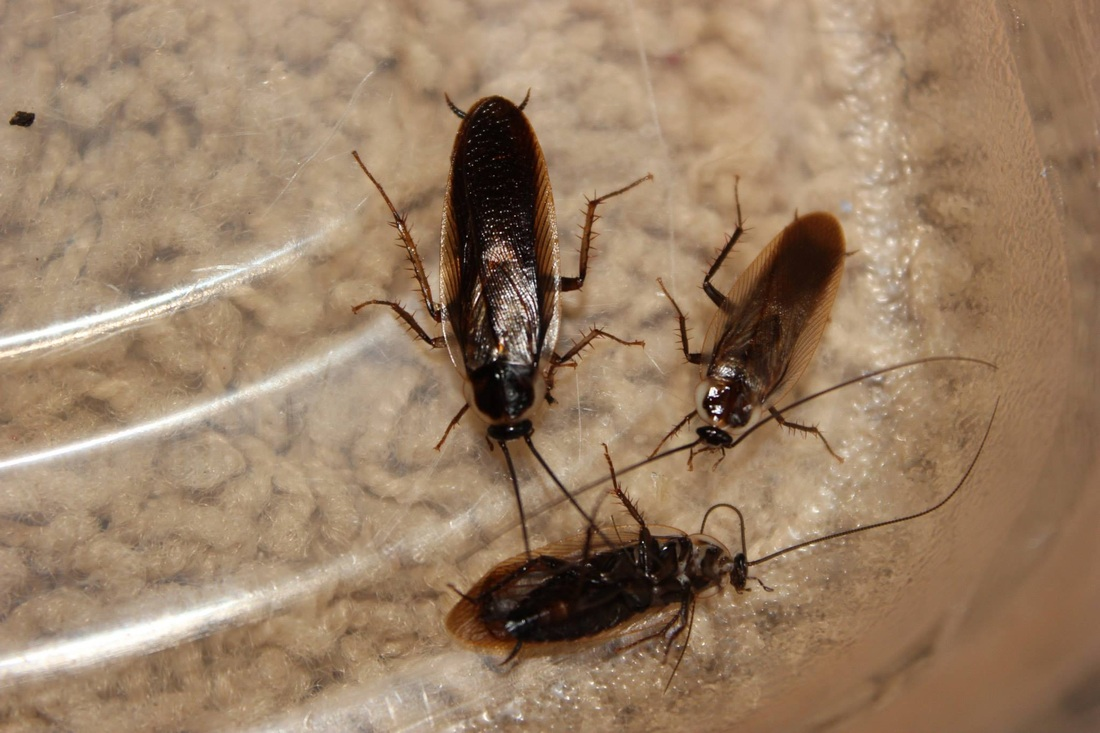
Adult male Parcoblatta pennsylvanica and Parcoblatta divisa adult males. The largest one is the P. pennsylvanica and the rest are P. divisa.

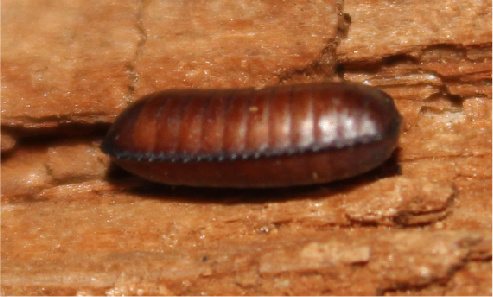
Ootheca

== See also ==
- Wood cockroach
- List of cockroaches of Texas
