= Entelopes longzhouensis =

Scientific classification
- Domain: Eukaryota
- Kingdom: Animalia
- Phylum: Arthropoda
- Class: Insecta
- Order: Coleoptera
- Suborder: Polyphaga
- Infraorder: Cucujiformia
- Family: Cerambycidae
- Genus: Entelopes
- Species: E. longzhouensis

Binomial name
- Entelopes longzhouensis Hua, 1990

Species of beetle

Entelopes longzhouensis is a species of beetle in the family Cerambycidae. It was described by Hua in 1990.
