= Nisibis amoena =

Scientific classification
- Kingdom: Animalia
- Phylum: Arthropoda
- Clade: Pancrustacea
- Class: Insecta
- Order: Blattodea
- Family: Ectobiidae
- Genus: Nisibis; Stål, 1877
- Species: N. amoena

Binomial name
- Nisibis amoena Stål, 1877

Synonyms
- Nisibis bilineata Navás, 1904

Species of cockroach

Nisibis is a genus of cockroaches in the family Ectobiidae, erected by Carl Stål in 1877. It contains the single species Nisibis amoena from the Philippines.
