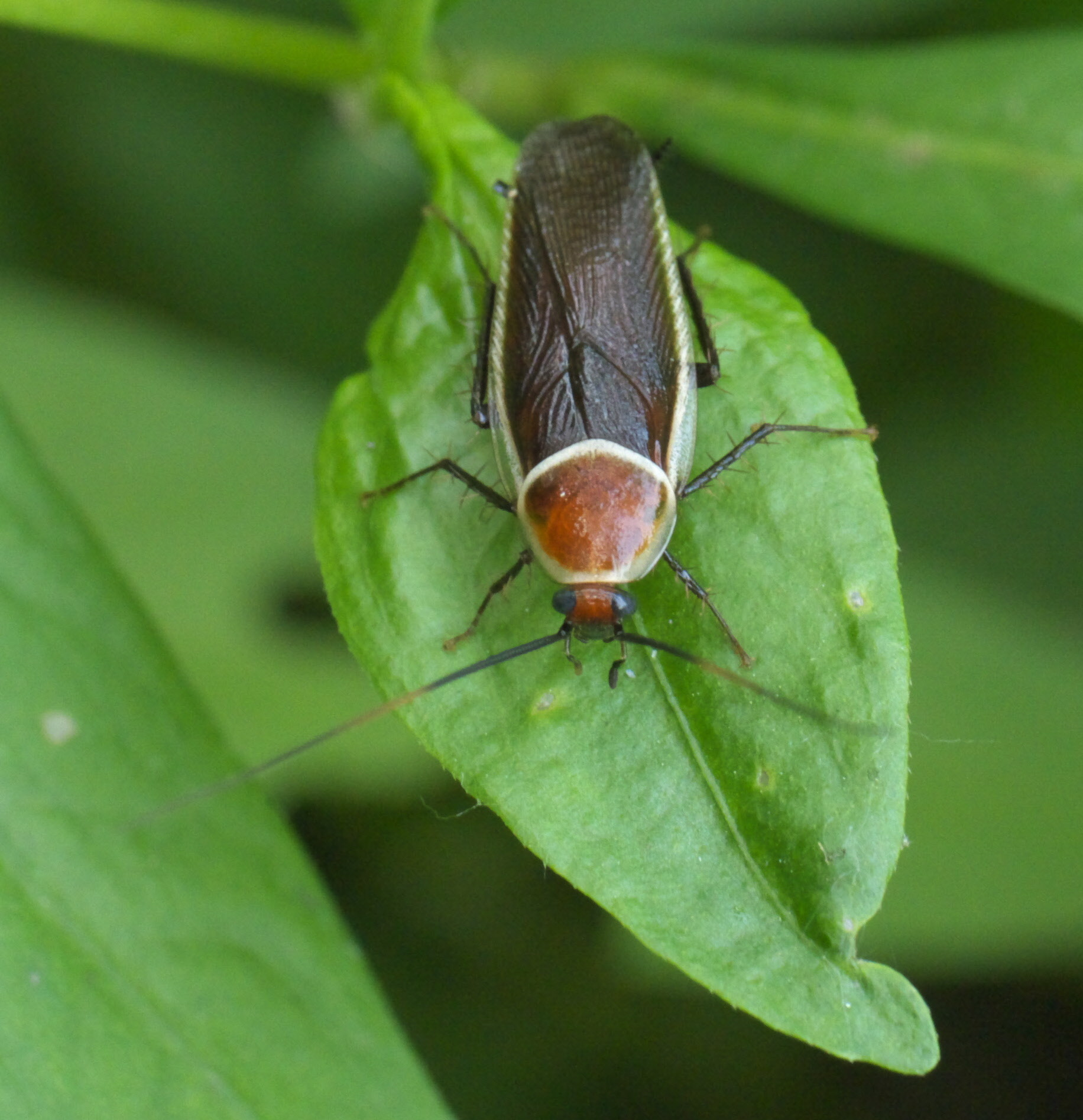
- Pseudomops septentrionalis

Scientific classification
- Kingdom: Animalia
- Phylum: Arthropoda
- Clade: Pancrustacea
- Class: Insecta
- Order: Blattodea
- Family: Ectobiidae
- Subfamily: Blattellinae
- Genus: Pseudomops; Serville, 1831

= Pseudomops =

Genus of cockroaches

Pseudomops is a genus of cockroach in the family Ectobiidae. There are more than 40 described species in Pseudomops.

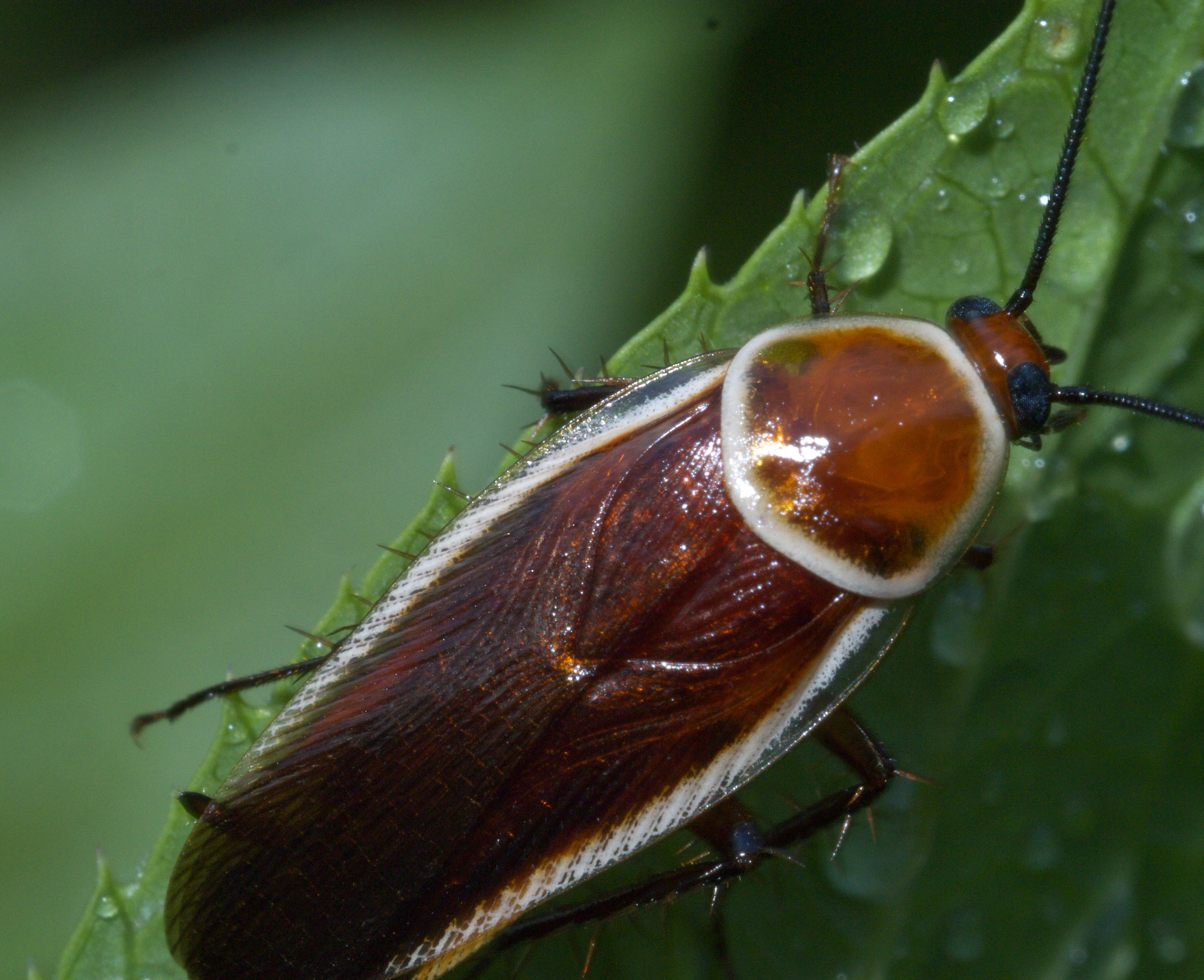
Pseudomops septentrionalis

== Species ==
These 44 species belong to the genus Pseudomops:

- Pseudomops affinis (Burmeister, 1838)
- Pseudomops albostriatus Shelford, 1906
- Pseudomops americanus (Saussure, 1869)
- Pseudomops angustus Walker, 1868
- Pseudomops annulicornis (Burmeister, 1838)
- Pseudomops aurantiacus (Saussure & Zehntner, 1893)
- Pseudomops bicolor Shelford, 1906
- Pseudomops boliviensis Princis, 1948
- Pseudomops boyacae Hebard, 1933
- Pseudomops brunneri (Saussure, 1869)
- Pseudomops burri Shelford, 1906
- Pseudomops cinctus (Burmeister, 1838)
- Pseudomops crinicornis (Burmeister, 1838)
- Pseudomops deceptura Walker, 1868
- Pseudomops dimidiatus Brullé, 1835
- Pseudomops discicollis (Burmeister, 1838)
- Pseudomops femoralis (Walker, 1868)
- Pseudomops flavipes (Burmeister, 1838)
- Pseudomops fluminensis Rocha e Silva, 1973
- Pseudomops gloriosus Hebard, 1920
- Pseudomops gratus Rehn, 1903
- Pseudomops guerinianus (Saussure, 1862)
- Pseudomops hirticornis (Burmeister, 1838)
- Pseudomops inclusus Walker, 1868
- Pseudomops interceptus (Burmeister, 1838)
- Pseudomops luctuosus (Saussure, 1868)
- Pseudomops magnifica Rocha e Silva, 1973
- Pseudomops magnus Shelford, 1906
- Pseudomops melanus Walker, 1868
- Pseudomops mimicus Walker, 1868
- Pseudomops neglectus Shelford, 1906
- Pseudomops nigrimaculis Fisk, 1977
- Pseudomops oblongatus (Linnaeus, 1758)
- Pseudomops obscurus (Saussure, 1869)
- Pseudomops petropolitanus Rocha e Silva, 1973
- Pseudomops piceus Princis, 1948
- Pseudomops praeclarus Rehn, 1928
- Pseudomops puiggarii (Bolívar, 1881)
- Pseudomops pyronotum Rehn, 1932
- Pseudomops rufescens Shelford, 1912
- Pseudomops septentrionalis Hebard, 1917 (pale bordered field cockroach)
- Pseudomops simulans Stål, 1860
- Pseudomops tristiculus Stål, 1860
- Pseudomops zonatus Rehn, 1928
