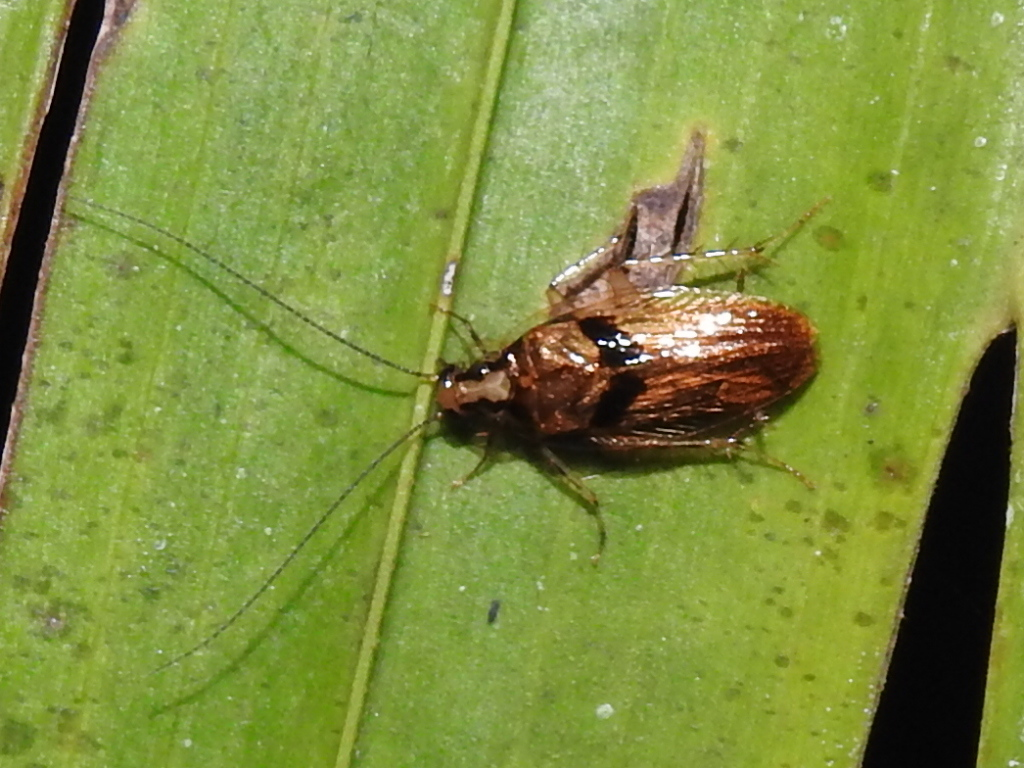
- Anaplecta hemiscotia

Scientific classification
- Kingdom: Animalia
- Phylum: Arthropoda
- Class: Insecta
- Order: Blattodea
- Superfamily: Blattoidea
- Epifamily: Blattoidae
- Family: Anaplectidae; Walker, 1868

= Anaplectidae =

Family of cockroaches

Anaplectidae is a family of cockroaches in the order Blattodea. Previously placed as a subfamily of the Ectobiidae there are presently (2020) two genera and more than 90 described species in Anaplectidae.

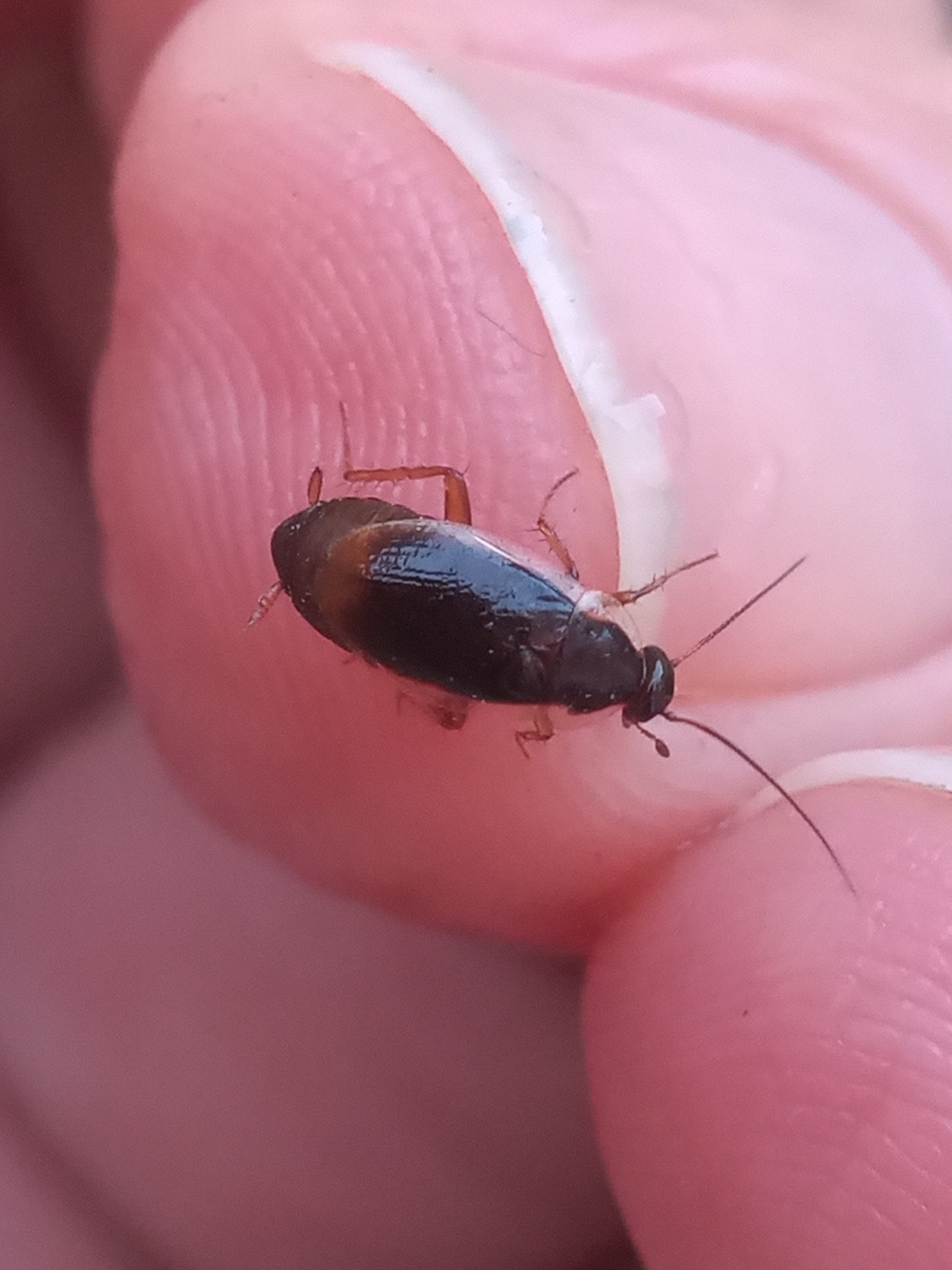
Anaplecta fallax (Anaplecta sp.)

== Genera ==
These two genera belong to the family Anaplectidae:

- Anaplecta Burmeister, 1838
- Maraca Hebard, 1926
