= Entelopes wallacei =

Scientific classification
- Kingdom: Animalia
- Phylum: Arthropoda
- Clade: Pancrustacea
- Class: Insecta
- Order: Coleoptera
- Suborder: Polyphaga
- Infraorder: Cucujiformia
- Family: Cerambycidae
- Genus: Entelopes
- Species: E. wallacei

Binomial name
- Entelopes wallacei Pascoe, 1856

Synonyms
- Entelopes (Wallaceentelopes) wallacei Pascoe, 1856

Species of beetle

Entelopes wallacei is a species of beetle in the family Cerambycidae. It was described by Francis Polkinghorne Pascoe in 1856. It can be found in Borneo.

Entelopes wallacei measure 9–14 mm (0.35–0.55 in).
