= Dziriblatta =

Scientific classification
- Kingdom: Animalia
- Phylum: Arthropoda
- Clade: Pancrustacea
- Class: Insecta
- Order: Blattodea
- Family: Ectobiidae
- Subfamily: Ectobiinae
- Genus: Dziriblatta; Chopard, 1936

Genus of cockroaches

External image
- Image at Novataxa

Dziriblatta is a genus of mostly Palaearctic cockroaches in the subfamily Ectobiinae, erected by Lucien Chopard in 1936. For several decades synonymized with Lobolampra, the genus was returned to valid status by Bohn in 2019, who provides information on its characteristics and differentiation from other genera, with a key to the subgenera. The species distribution includes: North Africa, the Iberian peninsula and associate Atlantic Ocean islands, with probably incomplete locality records to Cyprus and the Middle East.

== Species ==
The Cockroach Species File lists:

subgenus Autumnoblatta Bohn, 2019

1. Dziriblatta nasuta Bohn, 2019

subgenus Blattantis Bohn, 2019

1. Dziriblatta montana Chopard, 1936

subgenus Discleroblatta Bohn, 2019

1. Dziriblatta merrakescha (Adelung, 1914)

subgenus Dziriblatta Chopard, 1936

- species group Bolivari Chopard, 1936
1. Dziriblatta algerica (Bolívar, 1881) - type species (as Aphlebia algerica Bolívar)
2. Dziriblatta bolivari Chopard, 1936
3. Dziriblatta brevisacculata Bohn, 2021
4. Dziriblatta curvisetosa Bohn, 2021
5. Dziriblatta pilleata Bohn, 2021
- species group Lobososacculata Bohn, 2021
1. Dziriblatta altotuberculata Bohn, 2021
2. Dziriblatta lobososacculata Bohn, 2021
3. Dziriblatta planotuberculata Bohn, 2021
4. Dziriblatta ramososacculata Bohn, 2021
5. Dziriblatta undulata Bohn, 2021

subgenus Macaroblatta Bohn, 2019

1. Dziriblatta brullei (Princis, 1963)
2. Dziriblatta chavesi (Bolívar, 1898)
3. Dziriblatta dendroglandulosa Bohn, 2019
4. Dziriblatta infumata (Brunner von Wattenwyl, 1865)
5. Dziriblatta lindbergi (Chopard, 1954)
6. Dziriblatta pallidula (Princis, 1965)

subgenus Monoscleroblatta Bohn, 2019

1. Dziriblatta abdelazizi (Bolívar, 1908)
2. Dziriblatta aglandulosa Bohn, 2020
3. Dziriblatta azruensis (Werner, 1929)
4. Dziriblatta haffidi (Bolívar, 1908)

subgenus Pauciscleroblatta Bohn, 2019

1. Dziriblatta cyprica Bohn, 2020
2. Dziriblatta galilaeana (Bey-Bienko, 1969)
3. Dziriblatta habbachii Bohn, 2020
4. Dziriblatta kroumiriensis (Adelung, 1914)
5. Dziriblatta multiporosa Bohn, 2020
6. Dziriblatta stenoptera Bohn, 2020

subgenus Sculptoblatta Bohn, 2019

1. Dziriblatta nigriventris Chopard, 1936
2. Dziriblatta notabilis Chopard, 1936
3. Dziriblatta prisca Bohn, 2019

subgenus Sulcoblatta Bohn, 2019

1. Dziriblatta obscura Bohn, 2019
