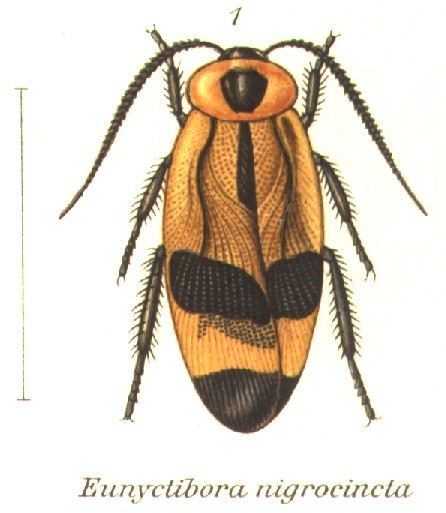
- Eunyctibora nigrocincta

Scientific classification
- Kingdom: Animalia
- Phylum: Arthropoda
- Clade: Pancrustacea
- Class: Insecta
- Order: Blattodea
- Family: Ectobiidae
- Subfamily: Nyctiborinae
- Genus: Eunyctibora; Shelford, 1908

= Eunyctibora =

Genus of cockroaches

Eunyctibora is a genus of cockroaches within the family Ectobiidae, with 5 currently assigned species.

== Species ==
- Eunyctibora bicolor (Shelford, 1907)
- Eunyctibora crassicornis (Burmeister, 1838)
- Eunyctibora magnifica Shelford, 1913
- Eunyctibora nigrocincta (Shelford, 1907)
- Eunyctibora omissa (Brancsik, 1901)
