= Robert W. C. Shelford =

British entomologist

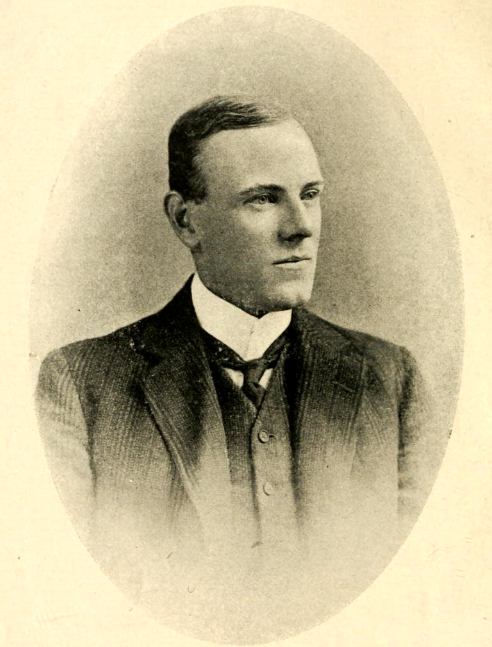
Robert Walter Campbell Shelford

Robert Walter Campbell Shelford (3 August 1872 – 22 June 1912), was a British entomologist and museum administrator and naturalist, with a special interest in entomology and insect mimicry; he specialised in cockroaches and also did some significant work on stick insects.

== Biography ==
Shelford was born on 3 August 1872 in Singapore, the son of a prominent British merchant. As a child, after an accident at the age of three, he developed a tubercular hip joint that incapacitated him for several years as a child. He became more mobile after an operation but was never able to participate in active sports as a child, although as an adult he enjoyed playing golf. The tuberculosis recurred in later life, and was the eventual cause of his death at an early age.

Shelford studied at King's College, London, and then at Emmanuel College, Cambridge. After graduating from Cambridge in 1895 he went to Yorkshire College in Leeds as a demonstrator in Biology. In 1897 he went to Sarawak as the Curator of the Sarawak Museum in Kuching, a post he held for seven years. While he was at the Sarawak Museum a substantial number of specimens were sent to his old university at Cambridge.

In 1905, he left Sarawak Museum and returned to England. He went to Oxford and became an Assistant Curator of the Hope Department of Zoology at the University Museum. On his way back to England he collected many specimens which he gave to the Hope Collection in Oxford, in addition to "the vast collection of Bornean insects which he had presented [to the Hope Collection] during 1899-1901 while Curator of the Sarawak Museum" (Smith, 1986: 58).

Most of his work at Oxford was on cockroaches, but he also worked on the other insects he had brought back from Borneo, and assisted in the library. It was at Oxford that he did most of his published research on phasmids.

Shelford married Audrey Gurney from Bath on 25 June 1908. In April 1909 he slipped and the tubercular disease flared up and severely limited his work throughout the final three years of his life. Robert Shelford died in Margate at the age of 39 on 22 June 1912.

== Species named after Shelford ==
Shelford has had several orthopteroid insects named after him. These include one Bornean mantis: Deroplatys shelfordi Kirby, 1903, one Bornean phasmid: Baculofractum shelfordi Bragg, 2005, two genera of cockroaches: Shelfordella Adelung, 1910 and Shelfordina Hebard, 1929, and 17 species of cockroaches.

An umbrella wasp, Polybia shelfordi was described from specimens collected around Kuching, but is now known as Polistes meadanus

Shelford is honored in the specific name of a species of scincid lizard: Sphenomorphus shelfordi Boulenger, 1900.

Plants named after him include Dischidia shelfordii Pears.

== Shelford's Cockroaches ==
Shelford described 44 new genera of cockroaches, and 326 new species.

== Shelford's Orthoptera ==
Shelford only described one subspecies of Orthoptera: Gryllacris vicinissima nigratae Shelford, 1902.

== Shelford's Phasmids ==
The vast majority of phasmid specimens in the Sarawak Museum in Kuching were collected during Shelford's time as curator, this is probably also the case for the majority of insect groups in the collection. Many of the Bornean specimens in both Oxford University and Cambridge University collections are also specimens collected during Shelford's time in Sarawak.

In 1901, Shelford briefly described the eggs of some phasmids that he referred to as "Necroscia, Marmessoidea and Agondasoidea". He also commented that "Phasmidae, notwithstanding their wonderful protective resemblance to sticks and leaves, are the staple form of diet of Trogons" [A family of birds].

In 1908 Shelford produced a catalogue of Central American phasmid species. This was based on Brunner (1907) & Redtenbacher's (1906 & 1908) publications, but includes some species that they omitted from their work.

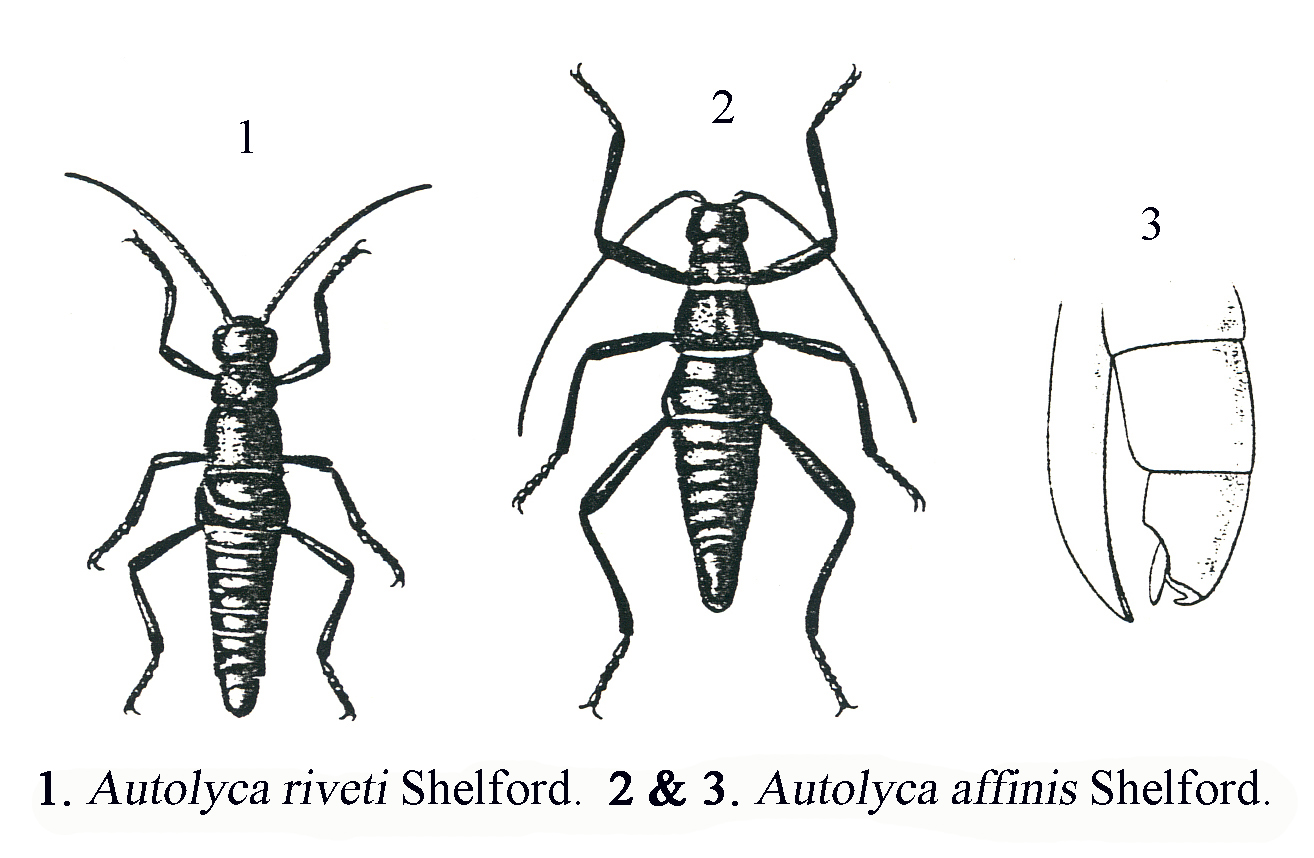
Illustration from Shelford's 1913 publication

Shelford only described five new species of Phasmida, based on work he did in Oxford. All were from South America and the descriptions were published in 1913, shortly after his death. These species are listed below.

Autolyca affinis Shelford, 1913: 61, pl. 3.7 & 3.8.

Autolyca riveti Shelford, 1913: 60, pl. 3.6.

Libethra intermedia Shelford, 1913: 61.

Ocnophila nana Shelford, 1913: 61.

Ocnophila riveti Shelford, 1913: 62.

In his book, A Naturalist in Borneo, Shelford includes several references to phasmids (pages 147-155, 215, & 315). Shelford's observations of Bornean insects are based on both observation in the wild, and in captivity. He comments on the nocturnal habits of many phasmids, and refers to his observations on "some that I have kept in captivity". He then goes on to say that "Most of the winged species of Phasmidae, especially some with brightly coloured wings, are diurnal feeders, or at any rate feed as readily during the day when in captivity as during the night". He makes several observations about eggs of phasmids in Borneo, and also reveals that he was keeping in England "a small colony of an "Indian Stick-Insect that has bred parthenogenetically for several generations" at the time he was writing his book.

== Publications ==
Shelford's best-known publication, his book A Naturalist in Borneo, was published in 1916, several years after his death, having been completed by his Oxford colleague, Edward Poulton. The book was popular when originally published, and was reprinted in paperback by Oxford University Press in 1985.

The only published biography of Shelford looks specifically at his work on phasmids (stick insects).
