= Karlis Princis =

Latvian-Swedish entomologist

- Born: 11 October 1893
- Died: 25 March 1978 (aged 84)
- Education: Riga Polytechnic
- Scientific career
- Fields: entomology
- Workplaces: Zoological Institute; Museum of Natural History at Riga

Kārlis Aleksandrs Princis (11 October 1893 – 25 March 1978) was a Latvian-born biologist who contributed to the study of the Blattodea while working at the Museum at Riga and later in Sweden.

Princis was born in Venta, near Ventspils and was educated at the Riga Polytechnic. He served during World War I in the Russian army and returned to the university, receiving a master's degree in 1934 and joining the Zoological Institute in 1940. He became a director of the Museum of Natural History at Riga in 1942. In 1944 he took refuge in Sweden with assistance from N.A. Kemner at Lund University. He lived in Vastmanland in 1973 and died at a hospital in Västerås.

Princis' most important work was on the systematics of cockroaches which he published as a volume of Junk's Orthopterorum Catalogus. He received an honorary Ph.D. in 1964 from the University of Lund.
