= Morgan Hebard =

American entomologist

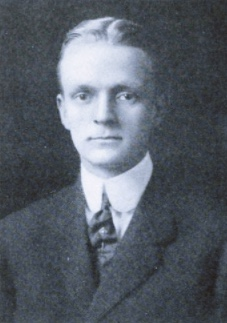
Morgan Hebard, from A History of the Class of 1910, Yale College

Morgan Hebard (February 23, 1887 – December 28, 1946) was an American entomologist who specialized in Orthoptera, and assembled a collection of over 250,000 specimens.

== Early life and education ==
Morgan Hebard was born on February 23, 1887, in Cleveland, Ohio to Hannah Jeanette (née Morgan) and Charles Samuel Hebard. Due to his family's lumber businesses, they had houses in Chestnut Hill, Philadelphia Pennsylvania, Thomasville, Georgia and Pequaming, Michigan, and he grew up exploring the outdoors in all three locations, as well as Miami, Florida, which his family regularly visited. Hebard attended Asheville School in North Carolina, educated by a private tutor, before graduating from Yale University in 1910. At Yale, Hebard won prizes as a member of the gun team. At the time of his graduation, he intended to enter the family lumber business.

== Career ==
He worked for brokers and bankers, Henry & West from 1910 to 1912 in Philadelphia. From 1910 to 1928, he was a research associate at the Academy of Natural Sciences of Philadelphia. For ten years after that he was the curate of entomology. Between 1938 and 1940, he was a research fellow. In 1945 and 1946, he was a benefactor of the academy. During field trips to Western Europe, Panama, Cuba, Jamaica, Columbia and the Bahamas, Hebard built a collection of 250,000 specimens, which he presented to the academy in 1945. He wrote 197 journal articles and monographs on entomological topics, either individually or jointly with his fellow entomologist, James A. G. Rehn, comprising over 5,000 pages. He described over 800 new species of orthopteroids; this included 44 new species and ten new genera of Phasmids (six new genera on his own and four as co-author with Rehn). Forty orthopteroid species and nine genera have been named after him, including: one Phasmid species, Ilocano hebardi Rehn & Rehn, 1938; three species of Mantids, and two genera: Hebardia Werner, 1921 and Hebardiella Werner, 1924; eight species of Cockroaches, and four genera: Hebardina Bei-Bienko, 1938, Hebardula Uvarov, 1939, Euhebardula Princis, 1953 (a replacement name for Hebardula Princis, 1950); and 28 species of Orthoptera, three genera: Hebardiniella Chopard, 1932, (emendation of Hebardinella Chopard, 1932), Hebarditettix Günther, 1938 and Hebardacris Rehn, 1952. He was a member of American Entomological Society, and for a time it's Treasurer, and was elected a Fellow of the Entomological Society of America. He was an honorary member of the Entomological Society of France, and also of the Columbian Natural Science Society.

== World War I ==
During World War I, Hebard was a Second Lieutenant for the Signal Officers Reserve Corps. He was a post supply officer and at Columbia University was acting adjutant at the Signal Corps School. He also served in Washington, D.C. at the Military Intelligence Division.

== Personal life ==
On October 16, 1913, he married Margaret Champlin Perry (née Claxton), a granddaughter of artist John La Farge (and who was also descended from Oliver Hazard Perry, Benjamin Franklin and Mayflower passenger William Brewster), and they had three children, naturalist Morgan Hebard, Jr., Charles Bradford Hebard (died February 27, 1930), and Margaret Champlin Perry, wife of Richard Wingate Lloyd (BA Princeton 1928) Beginning about 1936 he was affected by acute rheumatoid arthritis. He died in Philadelphia on December 28, 1946, and is buried at St Thomas' Cemetery in Whitemarsh Township, Pennsylvania. Hebard was a convert to the Catholic faith.
