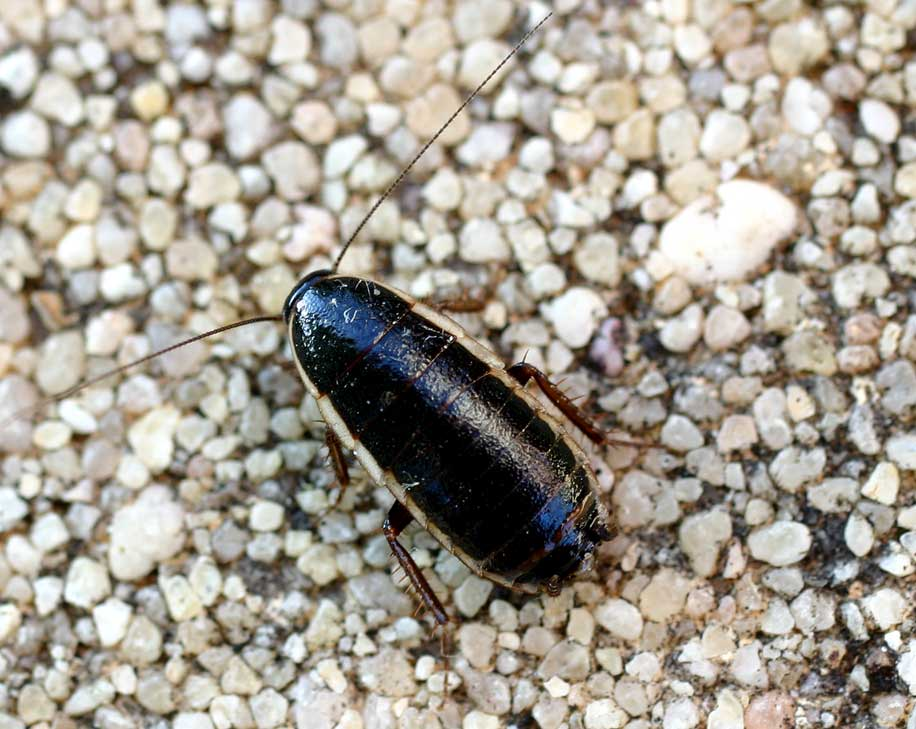
- Loboptera decipiens

Scientific classification
- Kingdom: Animalia
- Phylum: Arthropoda
- Clade: Pancrustacea
- Class: Insecta
- Order: Blattodea
- Superfamily: Blaberoidea
- Family: Ectobiidae; Brunner von Wattenwyl, 1865

Subfamilies
- See text

Synonyms
- Phyllodromiidae Brunner von Wattenwyl, 1865; Plectopterinae McKittrick, 1964; Blattellidae Karny, 1908

= Ectobiidae =

Wood cockroaches

Family of cockroaches

unidentified species, Brazil

Ectobiidae (formerly Blattellidae) is a family of the order Blattodea (cockroaches). This family contains many of the smaller common household pest cockroaches, among others. They are sometimes called wood cockroaches. A few notable species include:

- European native cockroaches – genera including Ectobius, Capraiellus, Phyllodromica and Planuncus
- Blattella asahinai: Asian cockroach
- Blattella germanica: German cockroach
- Cariblatta lutea: Small yellow cockroach
- Supella longipalpa: Brown-banded cockroach
- Parcoblatta spp. including the:
  - Parcoblatta fulvescens: Fulvous wood cockroach
  - Parcoblatta pennsylvanica: Pennsylvania wood cockroach
  - Parcoblatta virginica: Virginia wood cockroach

== Subfamilies and selected genera ==
The Cockroach Species File includes five subfamilies. The Anaplectinae, previously placed here, have now been elevated to family level.
NB: subfamilies marked § are complete list as of 2020:

=== Blattellinae ===
Auth.: Karny, 1908 – worldwide

- Attaphila Wheeler, 1900 (Neotropical)
- Blattella Caudell, 1903
- Ischnoptera Burmeister, 1838
- Loboptera Brunner von Wattenwyl, 1865, 1865
- Lobopterella Princis, 1957
- Neotemnopteryx Princis, 1951
- Parcoblatta Shelford, 1911
- Pseudomops Serville, 1831
- Saltoblattella Bohn, Picker, Klass & Colville, 2009
- Symploce Hebard, 1916
- Temnopteryx Brunner von Wattenwyl, 1865

=== Ectobiinae ===
§ Brunner von Wattenwyl, 1865 – Europe, Africa, Asia, Australia

1. Arbiblatta Chopard, 1936
2. Capraiellus Harz, 1976
3. Choristima Tepper, 1895
4. Dziriblatta Chopard, 1936
5. Ectobius Stephens, 1835
6. Ectoneura Shelford, 1907
7. Eutheganopteryx Shelford, 1912
8. Luridiblatta Fernandes, 1965
9. Phyllodromica Fieber, 1853
10. Planuncus Bohn, 2013
11. Pseudectoneura Princis, 1974
12. Stenectoneura Hebard, 1943
13. Theganopteryx Brunner von Wattenwyl, 1865

=== Nyctiborinae ===
§ – Mexico, Central and South America

- Eunyctibora Shelford, 1908
- Eushelfordia Hebard, 1925
- Eushelfordiella Lopes & Oliveira, 2007
- Megaloblatta Dohrn, 1887
- Muzoa Hebard, 1921
- Nyctantonina Vélez, 2013
- Nyctibora Burmeister, 1838
- Paramuzoa Roth, 1973
- Paratropes Serville, 1838
- Pseudischnoptera Saussure, 1869

=== Pseudophyllodromiinae ===
Worldwide distribution, selected genera:

- Balta Tepper 1893
- Ellipsidion Saussure, 1863
- Neoblattella Shelford, 1911
- Pseudophyllodromia Brunner von Wattenwyl, 1865
- Supella Shelford, 1911

=== Genera incertae sedis ===
1. Africablatta Rehn, 1933:
  - A. patricia (Gerstaecker, 1883)
2. Akaniblatta Princis, 1969
3. Alsteinia Hanitsch, 1950
4. Anareolaria Shelford, 1909
5. Aneurinita Hebard, 1935
6. Anisopygia Saussure, 1893
7. Antitheton Hebard, 1919
8. Aphlebiella Princis, 1965
9. Aruistra Princis, 1965
10. Astyloblatta Bey-Bienko, 1954
11. Atticola Bolívar, 1905
12. Blattellina Princis, 1951
13. Caloblatta Saussure, 1893
14. Celeriblattina Johns, 1966
15. Ceuthobia Hebard, 1921
16. Ceuthobiella Hebard, 1921
17. Dictyoblattella Uvarov, 1940
18. Dipteretrum Rehn, 1922
19. Discalida Woo, Guo & Li, 1985
20. Distichopis Bolívar, 1924
21. Disymploce Bey-Bienko, 1958
22. Drabeha Gurney, 1967
23. Duryodana Kirby, 1903
24. Dyakina Hebard, 1929
25. Eldaina Estrada-Álvarez, 2022
26. Eublattella Princis, 1950
27. Euhebardula Princis, 1953
28. Eulissosoma Hebard, 1926
29. Euloboptera Princis, 1955
30. Eurylestes Hebard, 1940
31. Hanitschella Princis, 1951
32. Hanitschia Bruijning, 1947
33. Hanstroemidium Princis, 1963
34. Hemipterisca Bey-Bienko, 1950
35. Hemipterota Saussure, 1893
36. Incoblatta Princis, 1948
37. Liosilpha Stål, 1874
38. Lophometopum Hebard, 1920
39. Mallotoblatta Saussure & Zehntner, 1895
40. Maretina Hebard, 1933
41. Maretiola Bey-Bienko, 1968
42. Margattina Bey-Bienko, 1958
43. Microblatta Hebard, 1933
44. Myrmeblattina Chopard, 1926
45. Namablatta Rehn, 1937
46. Neoleptoblatta Princis, 1963
47. Nimbablatta Princis, 1963
48. Nisibis Stål, 1877
49. Nymphodromia Rehn & Hebard, 1927
50. Onycholobus Hanitsch, 1938
51. Operculea Bolívar, 1924
52. Ovaliblatta Aiba & Oyama, 2026
53. Paraloboptera Saussure, 1870
54. Parascalida Hanitsch, 1936
55. Parellipsidion Johns, 1966
56. Phorticolea Bolívar, 1905
57. Piroblatta Shelford, 1907
58. Rudebeckia Princis, 1963
59. Sciablatta Hebard, 1921
60. Sinablatta Princis, 1950
61. Sutteriana Princis, 1957
62. Tairella Hebard, 1926
63. Xosaia Princis, 1963

== See also ==
- List of Orthopteroid genera containing species recorded in Europe
