= List of cockroaches of Texas =

This is a list of cockroaches of Texas, including all species of cockroaches (order Blattodea) found in the state of Texas as of 2001.

== Order Blattodea ==
=== Family Blattelidae ===
- Blattella asahinai (Asian field cockroach)
- Blattella germanica (German cockroach)
- Blattella vaga (field cockroach)
- Cariblatta lutea lutea (small yellow cockroach)
- Cariblatta lutea minima (least yellow cockroach)
- Chorisoneura texensis (small Texas cockroach)
- Euthlastoblatta abortiva (fragile cockroach)
- Euthlastoblatta gemma (shortwing gem cockroach)
- Ischnoptera deropeltiformis (dark wood cockroach)
- Ischnoptera rufa occidentalis
- Parcoblatta bolliana (Boll's wood cockroach)
- Parcoblatta caudelli (Caudell's wood cockroach)
- Parcoblatta desertae (desert wood cockroach)
- Parcoblatta divisa (southern wood cockroach)
- Parcoblatta fulvescens (fulvous wood cockroach)
- Parcoblatta lata (broad wood cockroach)
- Parcoblatta pennsylvanica (Pennsylvania wood cockroach)
- Parcoblatta virginica (Virginia wood cockroach)
- Parcoblatta zebra (banded wood cockroach)
- Plectoptera picta (pictured beetle cockroach)
- Pseudomops septentrionalis (palebordered field cockroach)

=== Family Blattidae ===
- Blatta lateralis (Turkestan cockroach)
- Blatta orientalis (oriental cockroach)
- Neostylopyga rhombifolia (harlequin cockroach)
- Periplaneta americana (American cockroach)
- Periplaneta australasiae (Australian cockroach)
- Periplaneta brunnea (brown cockroach)
- Periplaneta fuliginosa (smokybrown cockroach)

=== Family Blaberidae ===
- Attaphila fungicola (ant cockroach)
- Panchlora nivea (Cuban cockroach)
- Pycnoscelus surinamensis (Surinam cockroach)

=== Family Polyphagidae ===
- Arenivaga bolliana (Boll's sand cockroach)
- Arenivaga erratica (erratic sand cockroach)
- Arenivaga grata (pleasant sand cockroach)
- Arenivaga tonkawa (Tonkawa sand cockroach)
- Compsodes cucullatus (hooded cockroach)
- Compsodes schwarzi (Schwarz's hooded cockroach)
- Eremoblatta subdiaphana (hairy desert cockroach)
