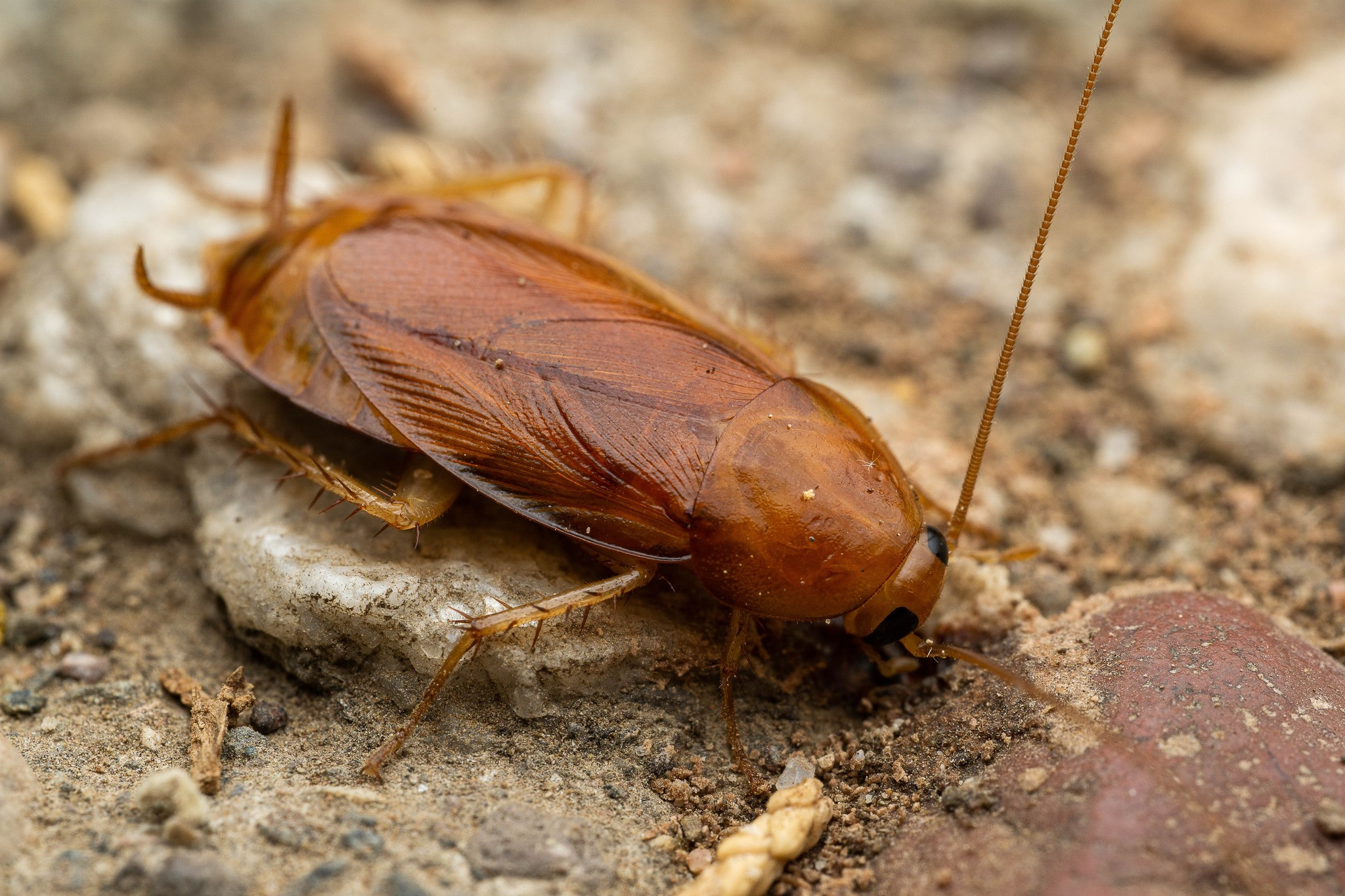

Scientific classification
- Kingdom: Animalia
- Phylum: Arthropoda
- Clade: Pancrustacea
- Class: Insecta
- Order: Blattodea
- Family: Ectobiidae
- Genus: Parcoblatta
- Species: P. notha

Binomial name
- Parcoblatta notha (Rehn J. A. G. & Hebard, 1910)

Synonyms
- Ischnoptera notha Rehn, J. A. G. & Hebard 1910

= Parcoblatta notha =

Species of cockroach

Parcoblatta notha, the Arizona wood cockroach, is a species of wood cockroach that occurs only in the southwestern US state of Arizona. It is a relatively large, light colored member of the 12-species wood cockroach genus Parcoblatta. The male has fully developed wings and is able to fly, while the female wings are around half as long and does not fly.

== Description ==
The male is the most slender of the larger pale species in the genus. Its pronotum is relatively long for the genus. It has fully developed tegmina and wings. It has a specialization on the median and first dorsal abdominal segments: on the median segment are two subtriangular, rounded elevations with very heavy tuft of hairs, and a few scattered hairs on the rest of the segment; on the first dorsal abdominal segment, the same specialization occurs, but with narrower elevations and fewer scattered hairs. The same specializations occur in P. caudelli and P. lata on the same segments, but they are much more pronounced in P. notha.

The male general coloration is a light yellowish tan. The ocelli are cream colored. The disk of the pronotum and the hair tufts on its abdomen are a darker tan to brown. The edges of the pronotum, and the tegmina, are transparent.

The female has complete tegmina and wings, but the tegmina stop before the apex of the abdomen (prior to the base of the supra-anal plate), and the wings can not support sustained flight. The pronotum of the female is larger and broader than in the male.

The female general coloration is auburn.

The only other pale species of the genus in which the female has complete tegmina and wings is P. caudelli, which is smaller, has relatively longer tegmina and wings, and has fully powered flight.

Morgan Hebard's 1917 description included measurement ranges based on 5 male specimens and 2 female specimens:

	Male	Female
Body length	14.5–18.0 mm (0.57–0.71 in)	14.0–14.7 mm (0.55–0.58 in)
Pronotum length	3.8–4.3 mm (0.15–0.17 in)	4.4–4.6 mm (0.17–0.18 in)
Pronotum width	4.8–5.3 mm (0.19–0.21 in)	5.7–5.9 mm (0.22–0.23 in)
Tegmina length	16.7–18.6 mm (0.66–0.73 in)	9.4–10.2 mm (0.37–0.40 in)
Tegmina width	4.8–5.6 mm (0.19–0.22 in)	4.0–4.1 mm (0.16–0.16 in)

== Distribution and habitat ==
The species is known only in the southwestern US state of Arizona, with specimens collected from the city of Prescott, the settlement of Reef (later renamed Palmerlee, then Garces; now a ghost town at the Miller Canyon Recreation Area) in Cochise County, Kitt Peak in the Baboquivari Mountains, the Galiuro Mountain Range, the Huachuca Mountains, the Patagonia Mountains, Sabino Basin in the Santa Catalina Mountains, and the Santa Rita Mountains. Morgan Hebard predicted in his 1917 description that "it will unquestionably be found, probably widely distributed, in adjacent northern Mexico."

The species has been found under bark, and sometimes in homes near wooded areas. It is reported as an occasional nuisance in houses.
