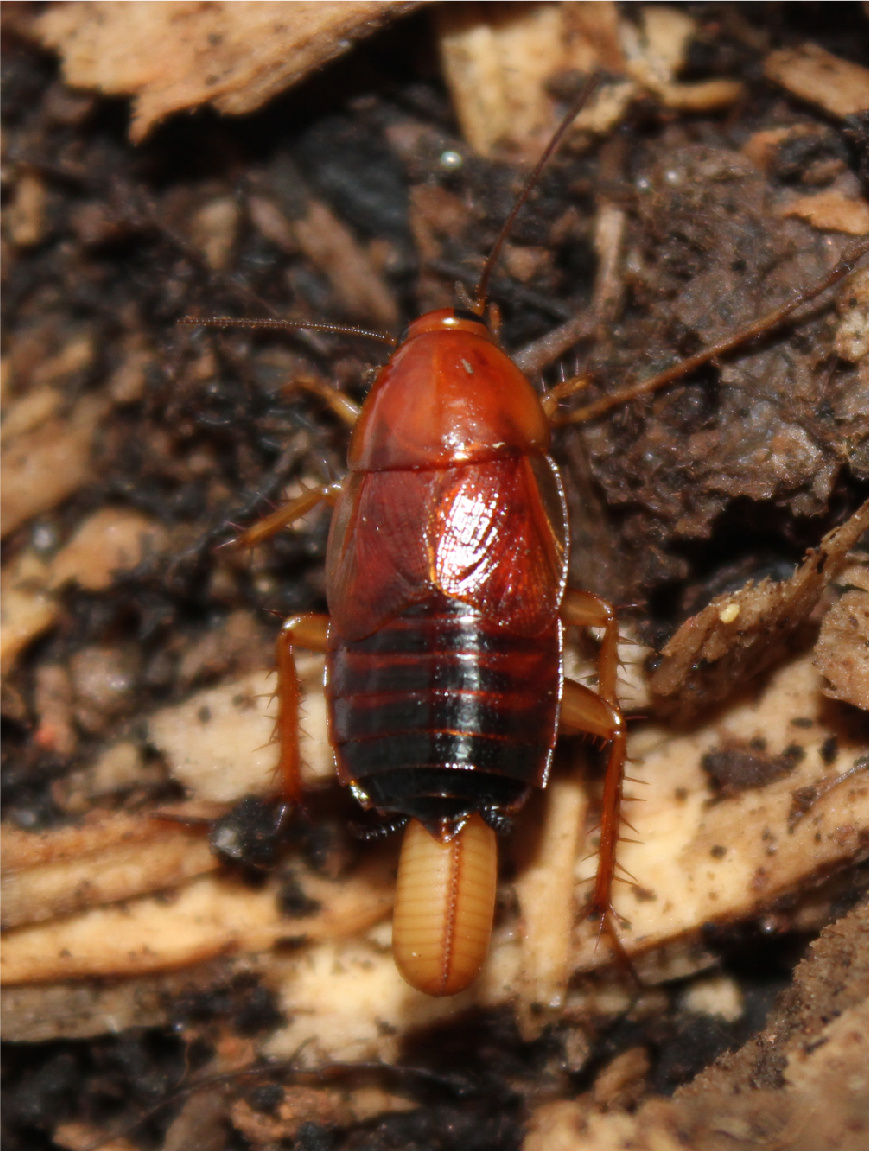
- Adult female Parcoblatta fulvescens laying ootheca. Caught in Wake County, NC.

Scientific classification
- Kingdom: Animalia
- Phylum: Arthropoda
- Clade: Pancrustacea
- Class: Insecta
- Order: Blattodea
- Family: Ectobiidae
- Genus: Parcoblatta
- Species: P. fulvescens

Binomial name
- Parcoblatta fulvescens (Saussure and Zehntner, 1893)

Synonyms
- Temnopteryx texensis Saussure & Zehntner, 1893

= Parcoblatta fulvescens =

Species of cockroach

Parcoblatta fulvescens, the fulvous wood cockroach, is a species of cockroach endemic to the United States and possibly Canada that measures around 13 mm (0.5 in) long.

== Description ==
The male Parcoblatta fulvescens is relatively slender, has long tegmina (outer forewings), and is slightly longer than the female. It is a mostly uniform pale brownish-yellow, with sometimes darker pronotum (the plate behind the head) and legs, and usually dark brown cerci (the pair of appendages on its rear-most segment). Its pronotum is subelliptical (nearly elliptical), is widest just behind its middle, and has weakly defined disc-like impressions.

The female head and pronotum are usually a pale reddish-brown, its short tegmina are reddish brown with paler sides, its abdominal segments are a darker brown, and its legs and underside are a brownish yellow.

	Male	Female
Body length	12.5–16.5 mm (0.49–0.65 in)	10.8–15.5 mm (0.43–0.61 in)
Pronotum length	3.3–4.0 mm (0.13–0.16 in)	3.8–4.9 mm (0.15–0.19 in)
Pronotum width	4.3–5.3 mm (0.17–0.21 in)	4.6–6.6 mm (0.18–0.26 in)
Tegmina length	14.0–18.2 mm (0.55–0.72 in)	3.1–5.6 mm (0.12–0.22 in)
Tegmina width	4.3–5.6 mm (0.17–0.22 in)	3.3–4.7 mm (0.13–0.19 in)

The species' ootheca (egg case) is bean-shaped, very dark brown, and measures about 8.5 mm (0.33 in) long by 3.8 mm (0.15 in) wide. The edge with a seam is curved and has about 40 small crimps or folds. It is similar to the ootheca of P. virginica, but is larger and has slightly narrower spacing of vertical divisions.

Two differently colored forms of the species were regularly collected in Kansas: a dark, olive gray to brown variety from Riley County, Kansas, and a light, golden brown to tan variety from the slopes of the Flint Hills pastures near Manhattan, Kansas.

=== Similar species ===
The species was treated by one source in 1910 as a southern variety of Parcoblatta uhleriana, termed P. uhleriana fulvescens, as the males of the two species look very similar. Among their differences are that P. fulvescens has a pale face, longer pronotum with less distinct disc-like impressions, narrower tegmina, and different characteristics in its cerci and its anal styles (two threadlike processes on the terminal segment of the abdomen). In addition, pre-1917 Arizona records of uhleriana and uhleriana fuvescens refer to Parcoblatta notha.

Female specimens of P. fulvescens can be confused with P. virginica and P. lata. Females of P. virginica are on average smaller and less robust, less often have wide coloration differences, normally have a supra-anal plate with straight lateral edges that converge in a more acute apex, have a less convex caudal (rear) edge of the sixth dorsal abdominal segment, and have fewer proximal spines of the cephalic femora. Females of P. lata are much larger and more robust, with a more transverse pronotum.

== Distribution ==
The distribution of the species includes Ontario, Canada, and the eastern United States, including Alabama, Arkansas, the District of Columbia, Florida, Georgia, Illinois, Indiana, Iowa, Kansas, Maryland, Mississippi, Missouri, New Jersey, New York, North Carolina, South Carolina, Virginia, and Texas. It is not clear if the species is native or adventive in Canada.

== Habitat ==
The species has been found in heavy, barrier-beach forest, in pine-barrens undergrowth (both typical or heavy and grassy), on the borders of pine barrens, on swamp edges, in heavy deciduous forest, and in heavy oak woods. In Florida it has been found in mesic hammock, xeric hammock, scrub, and sand hill habitats.

Individuals may be found under dead leaves, pine needles (particularly beneath shortleaf pine), logs, beneath loose bark, or wandering at night.

== Additional images ==
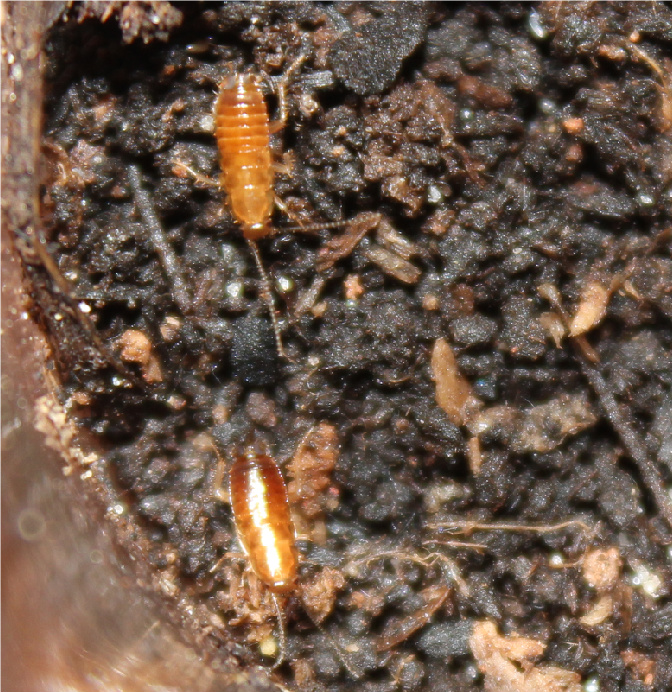
Likely 1st to 3rd instar nymphs.
