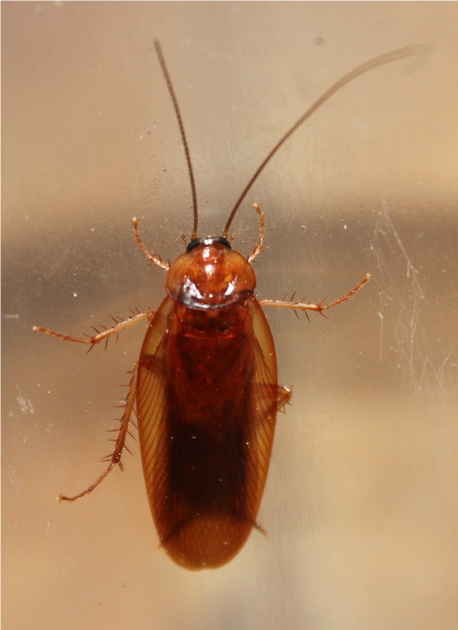
- Adult male Parcoblatta uhleriana
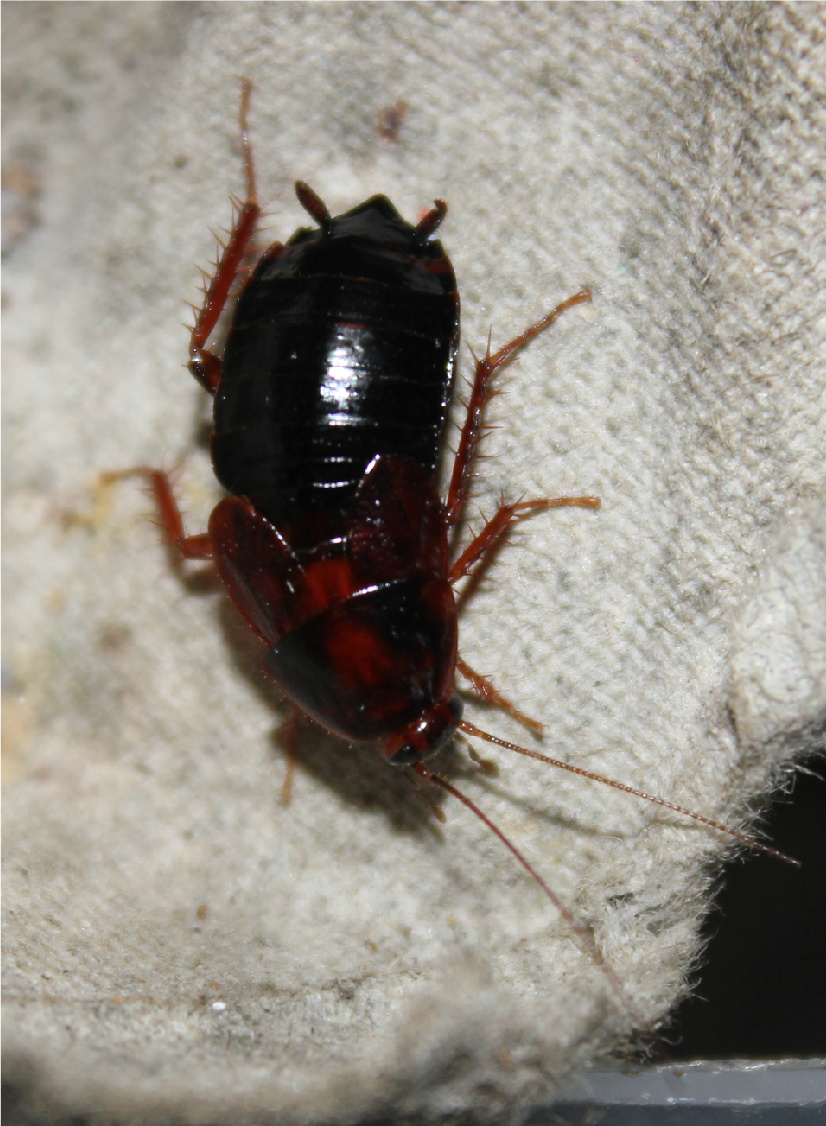
- Adult female Parcoblatta uhleriana

Scientific classification
- Kingdom: Animalia
- Phylum: Arthropoda
- Clade: Pancrustacea
- Class: Insecta
- Order: Blattodea
- Family: Ectobiidae
- Genus: Parcoblatta
- Species: P. uhleriana

Binomial name
- Parcoblatta uhleriana (Saussure, 1862)

Synonyms
- Ectobia lithophila (Scudder, 1862); Ischnoptera intricata (Blatchley, 1903); Ischnoptera uhleriana Saussure, 1862; Platamodes unicolor (Scudder, 1862)

= Parcoblatta uhleriana =

Species of cockroach

Parcoblatta uhleriana, the Uhler's wood cockroach, is a species of Parcoblatta native to the United States and Canada. It is a forest species also found in disturbed and urban environments. The male of the species flies freely, while the female does not fly.

== Description ==
The male Parcoblatta uhleriana is a mostly uniform pale brownish-yellow, with slightly darker tegmina (outer forewings). It is relatively slender, with a broad head, and brownish stripe from the middle of its eyes downward. Its pronotum (the shield behind its head) is subelliptical (nearly elliptical), widest at the middle, and rounded angles.

The female of the species coloration is more variable, but is usually a shining blackish-brown, and sometimes a dark reddish-brown except its abdomen. Most of the legs, and the edges of the tegmina, are a chestnut brown. It is broader, with a wider head, than the male. Its pronotum is suborbicular (nearly round), widest near the base. Tegmina at most reach the second abdominal segment, and its wings are rudimentary.

	Male	Female
Body length	13.3–16.5 mm (0.52–0.65 in)	9.8–14.0 mm (0.39–0.55 in)
Pronotum length	2.9–3.6 mm (0.11–0.14 in)	3.4–4.2 mm (0.13–0.17 in)
Pronotum width	4.1–4.9 mm (0.16–0.19 in)	4.8–5.6 mm (0.19–0.22 in)
Tegmina length	15.7–18.8 mm (0.62–0.74 in)	3.2–6.3 mm (0.13–0.25 in)
Tegmina width	5.3–5.6 mm (0.21–0.22 in)	2.5–3.7 mm (0.098–0.15 in)

Females are readily distinguished from allied species by their short, separated tegmina and shining black color, while males are more difficult to separate from P. fulvescens and P. virginica.

The ootheca (egg case) is typically 3.4–3.5 mm (0.13–0.14 in) wide, and variously reported as ranging from 6–9 mm (0.24–0.35 in) long. It has a row of small, well-spaced conical projections which set it apart as "an entirely different type from that known for any other species of the genus".

== Distribution ==
The distribution of the species is limited to Ontario, Canada and the eastern United States, including Alabama, Connecticut, Delaware, District of Columbia, Florida, Georgia, Illinois, Indiana, Iowa, Kansas, Maryland, Massachusetts, Michigan, Mississippi, Missouri, New Jersey, New York, North Carolina, South Carolina, Pennsylvania, Tennessee, and Virginia.

== Habitat ==
Parcoblatta uhleriana is considered a dense deciduous forest species, with a preference for microhabitats that have deep, moist leaf mold and plant litter, but is also found along the borders of wooded areas, as well as in suburban areas. It is often found beneath both dry and damp leaves, pine needles, and other debris, as well as under loose bark, in decaying logs, on foliage, grass, and on roads at night.

A study of habitat preferences in Kansas found that in forested areas, females were usually observed on the ground, while males were primarily found on bushes, though also found on the ground or grass. In disturbed areas, female were also moving on the ground, while males were usually seen on or flying to blades of grass. Males were found at a mean height of 71 cm in forest areas, or 42 cm in nonforest areas, while females were found at a mean height of 7 cm in forest areas, and 5 cm in nonforest areas.

A survey of ants and cockroaches outside suburban houses in the Raleigh, North Carolina area found P. uhleriana the most frequently caught cockroach species, using soil-level pitfall traps.

== Behavior ==
Nocturnal observations of feeding adults have found the species eating mushrooms, moss, bird feces and mammalian cartilage. Females feeding on a mushroom were observed biting, kicking, lunging, and posturing when they contacted one another. Males and females in a laboratory study showed similar levels of agonism in same-sex encounters, with no agonism in about 31-36% of encounters, threat in 42-48% of encounters, kicking or biting by one cockroach in 19-20% of encounters, and kicking or biting by both cockroaches in 2% of encounters.

Males are often attracted to and fly to light, and females are attracted to molasses used as a bait. The species has also been reported to be attracted at night to honeydew secreted by aphids on pear species.

== Symbiotic associates ==
The fungal species Herpomyces arietinus was found to infect P. uhleriana nymphs in a laboratory, possibly through contact with infected P. virginica.

The protozoan species Gregarina parcoblattae is found in the midgut of P. uhleriana as well as P pensylvanica.

The nematode species Protrellus aurifluus is found in the intestinal tract of both P. uhleriana and P. lata.

An unidentified species of mite in the hypopial (migratory larval) stage was found deeply embedded in the body fat of two P. uhleriana individuals in North Carolina.

The wasp species Hyptia harpyoides parasitizes the ootheca of P. uhleriana, as well as P. virginica and P pensylvanica. The last instar larva of the wasp overwinters inside the ootheca.

== Additional images ==
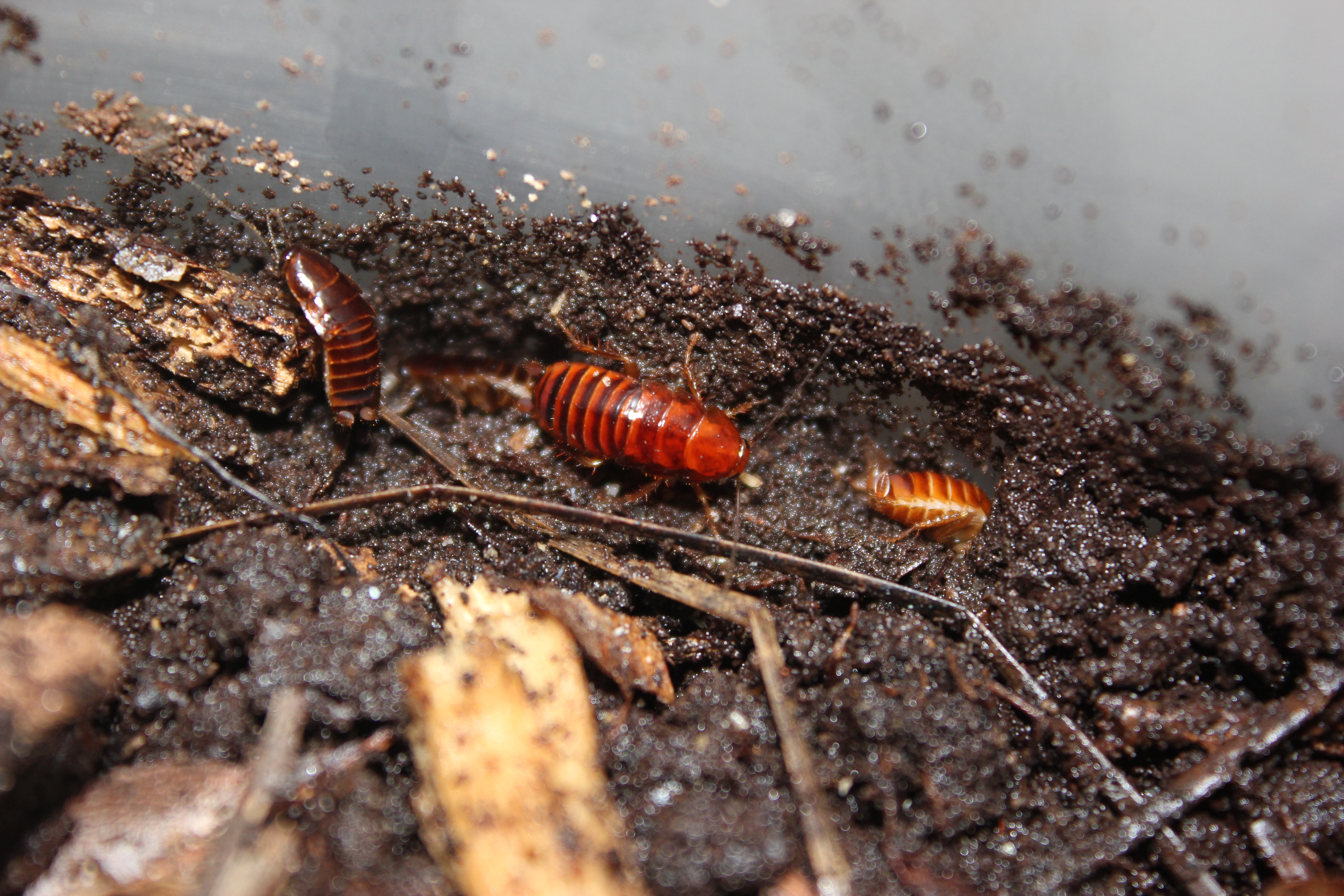
Nymphs of Parcoblatta uhleriana

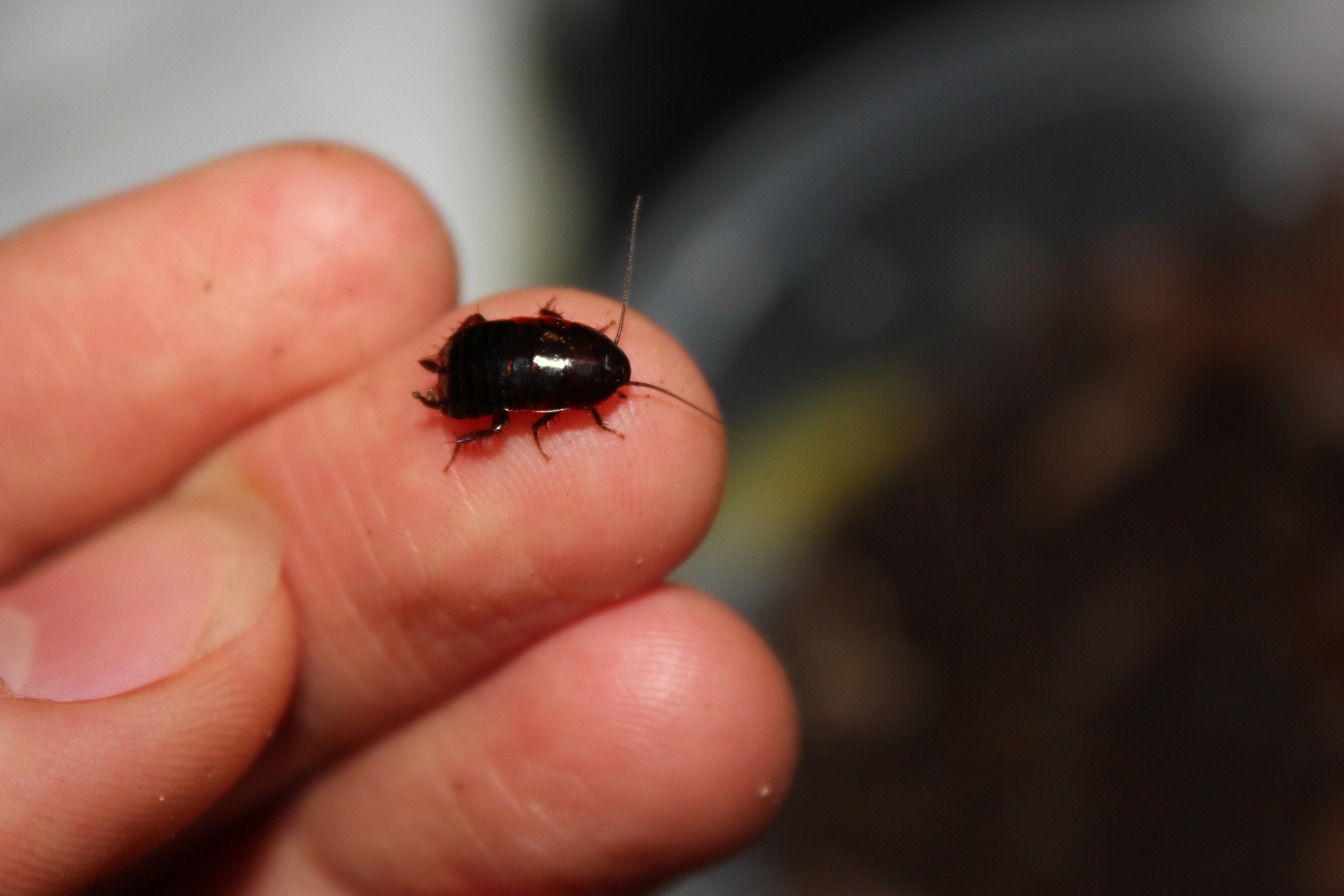
Nymph

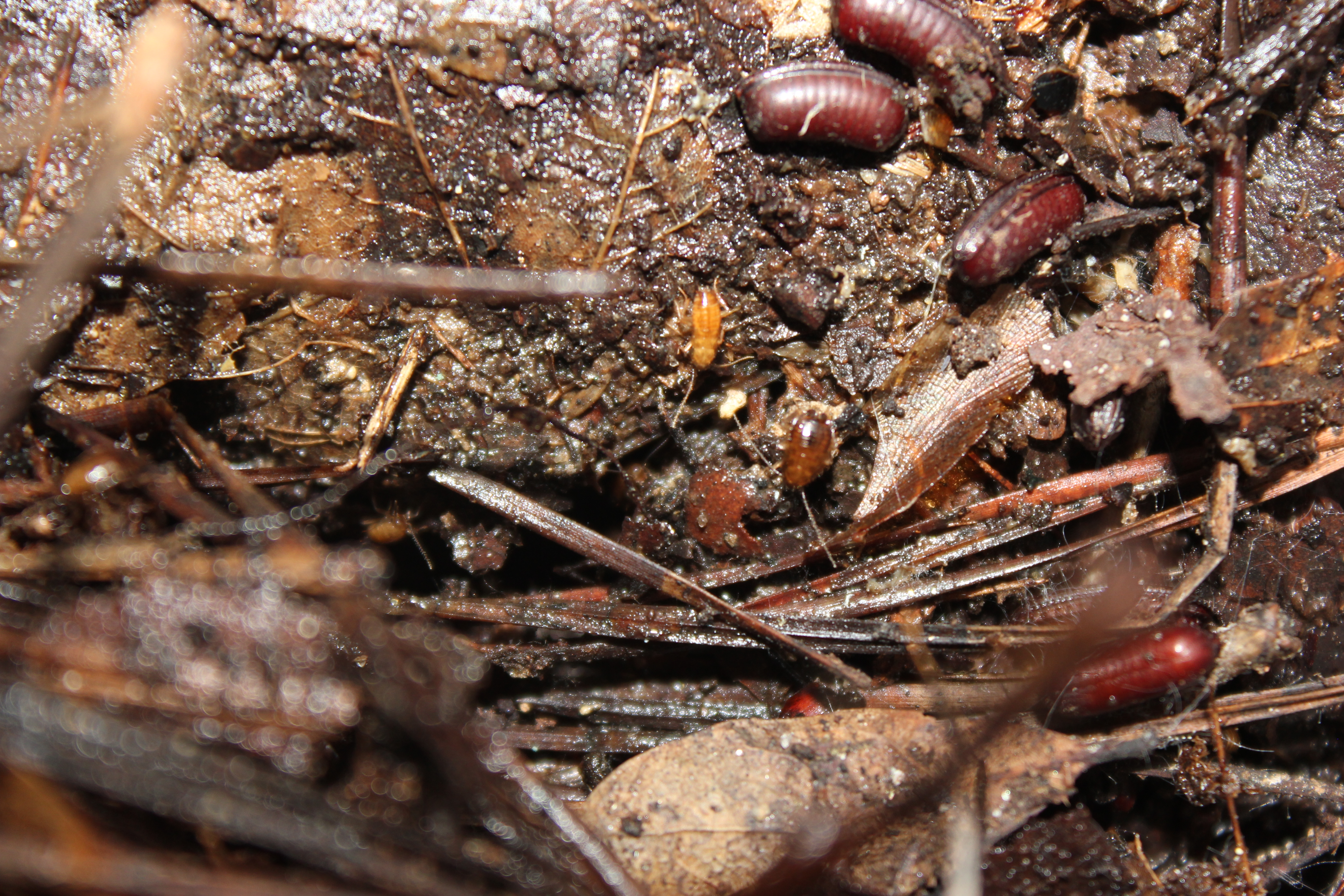
Parcoblatta uhleriana nymphs and oothecae. 1st instar nymph on the left and 2nd instar nymph on the right.

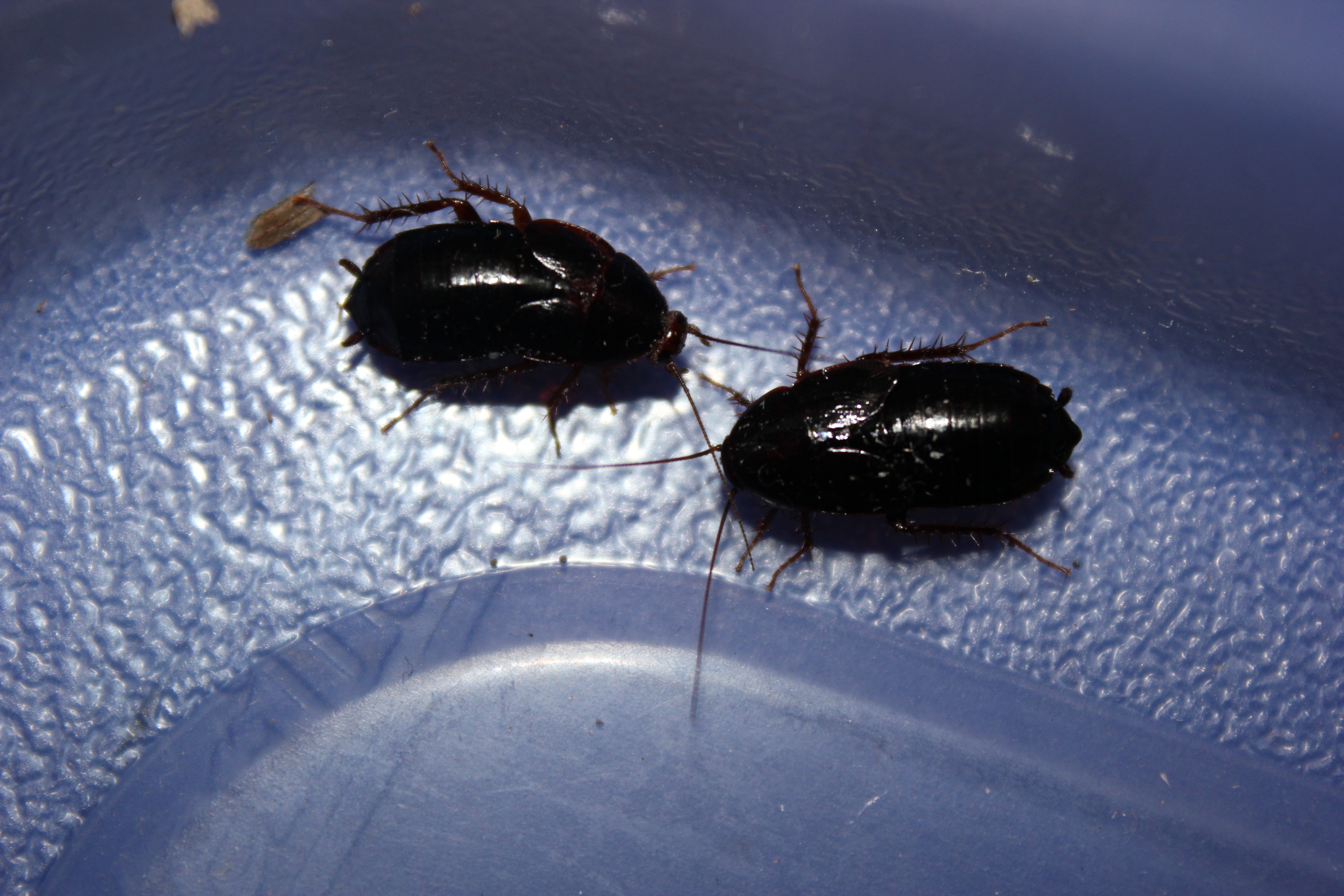
Two adult females

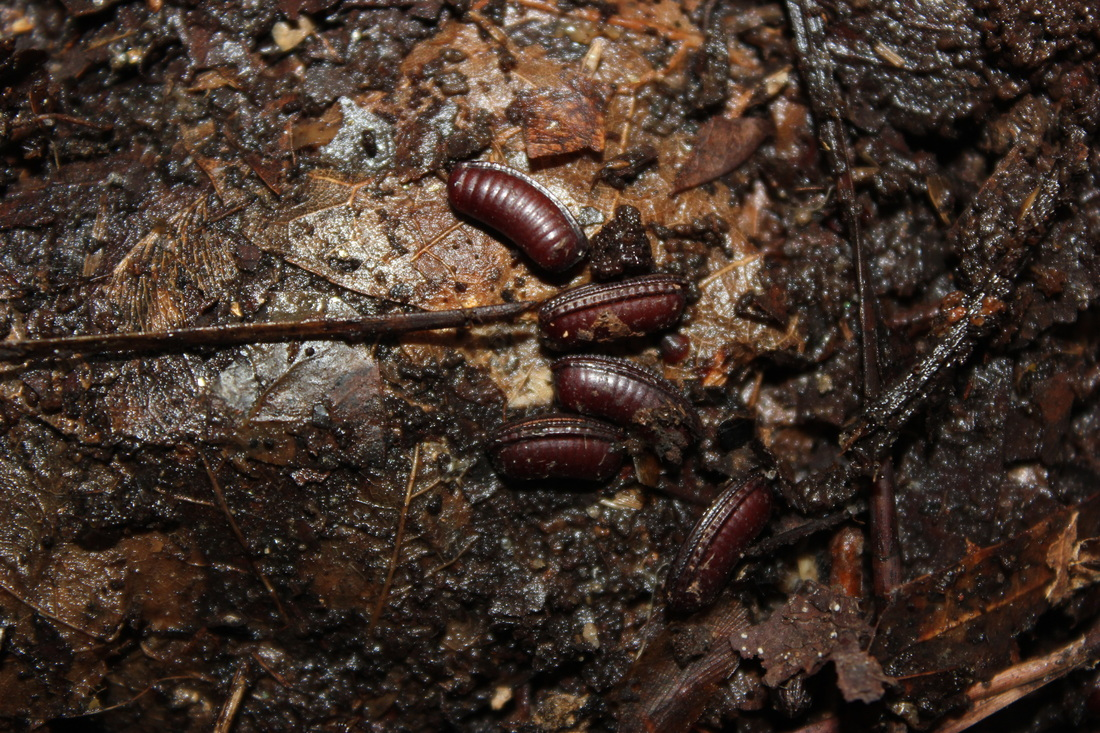
Oothecae of Parcoblatta uhleriana

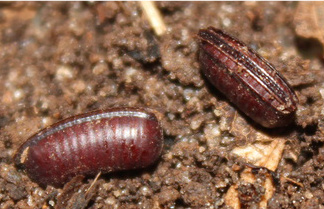
Oothecae of Parcoblatta uhleriana

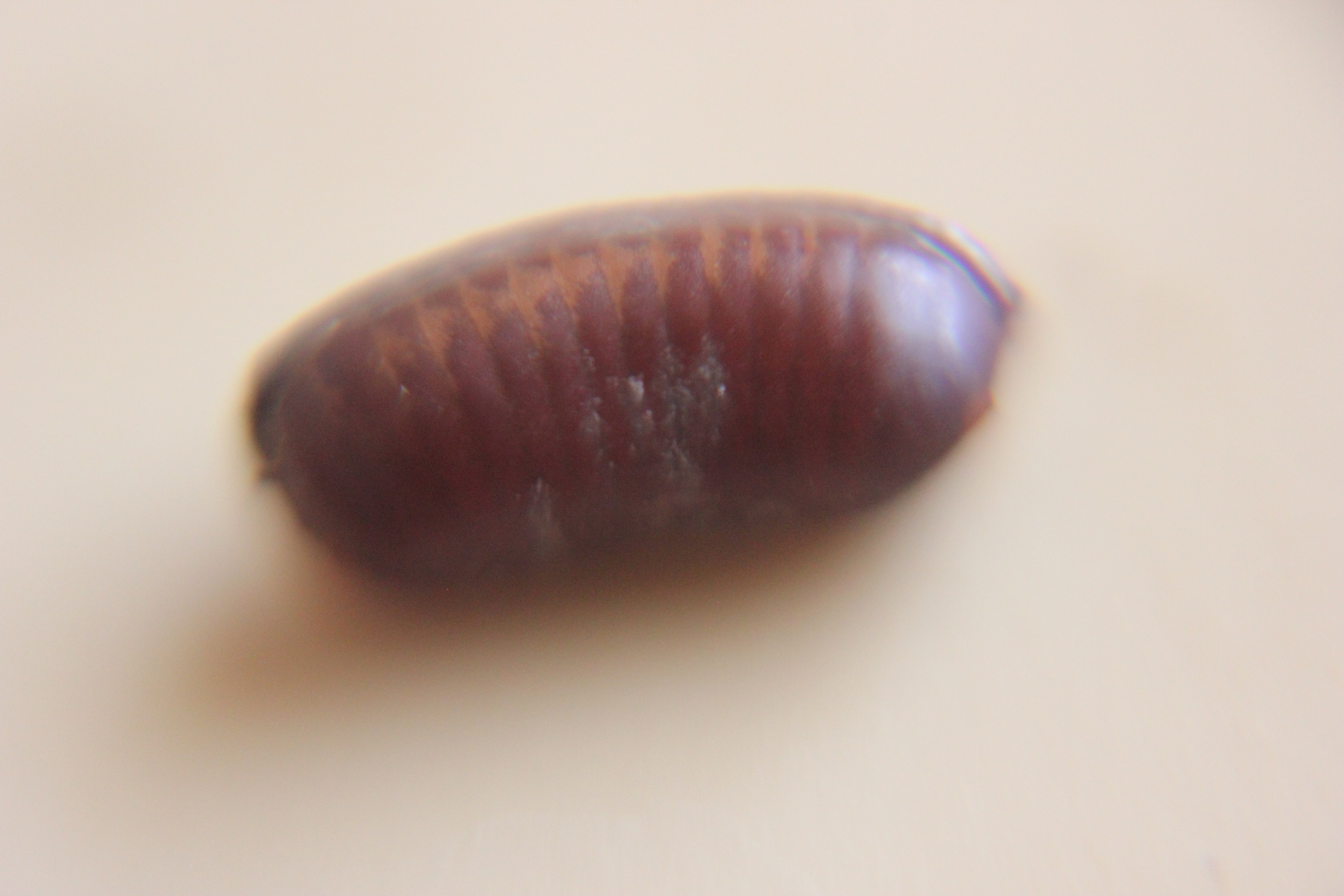
Ootheca of Parcoblatta uhleriana

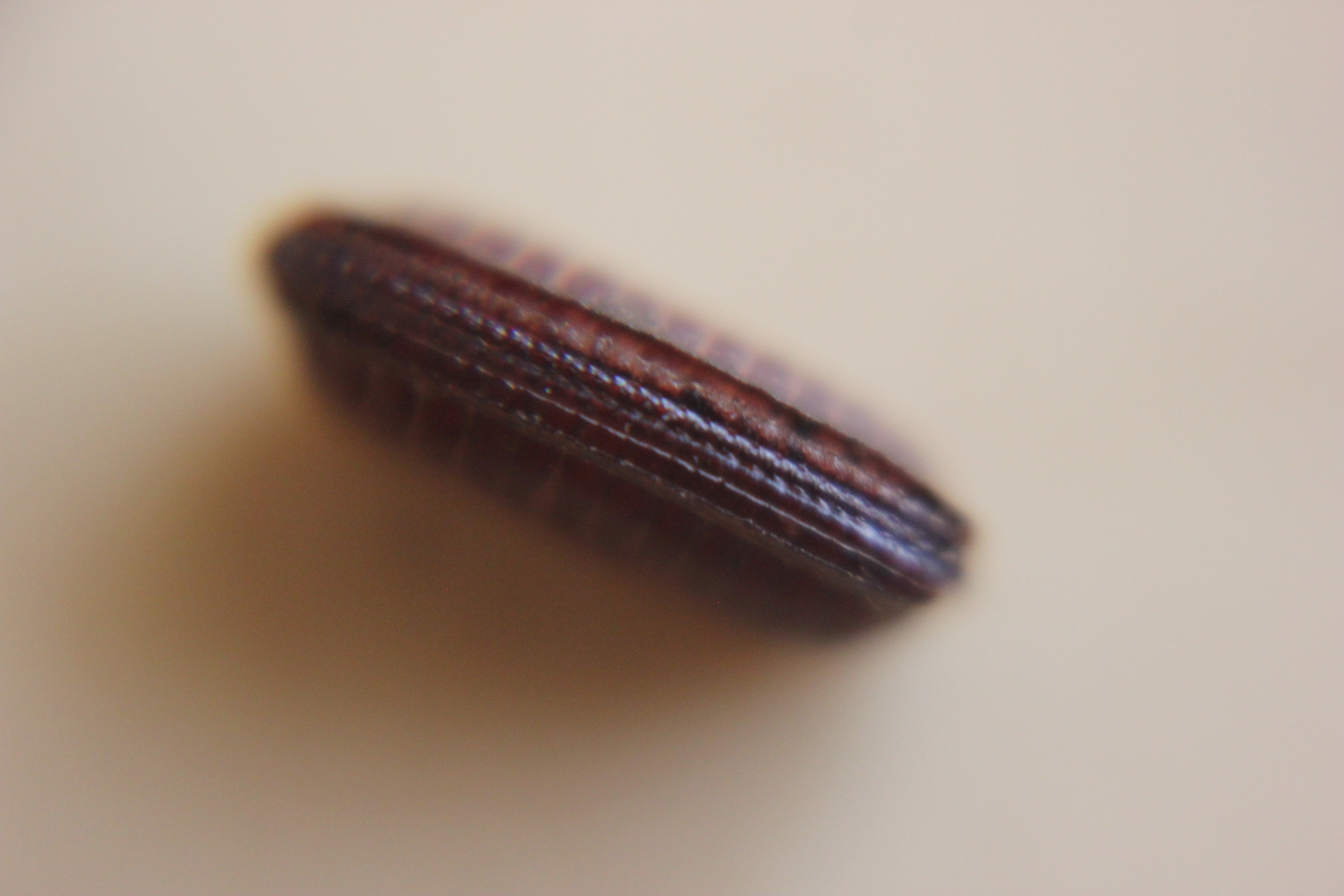
Ootheca of Parcoblatta uhleriana

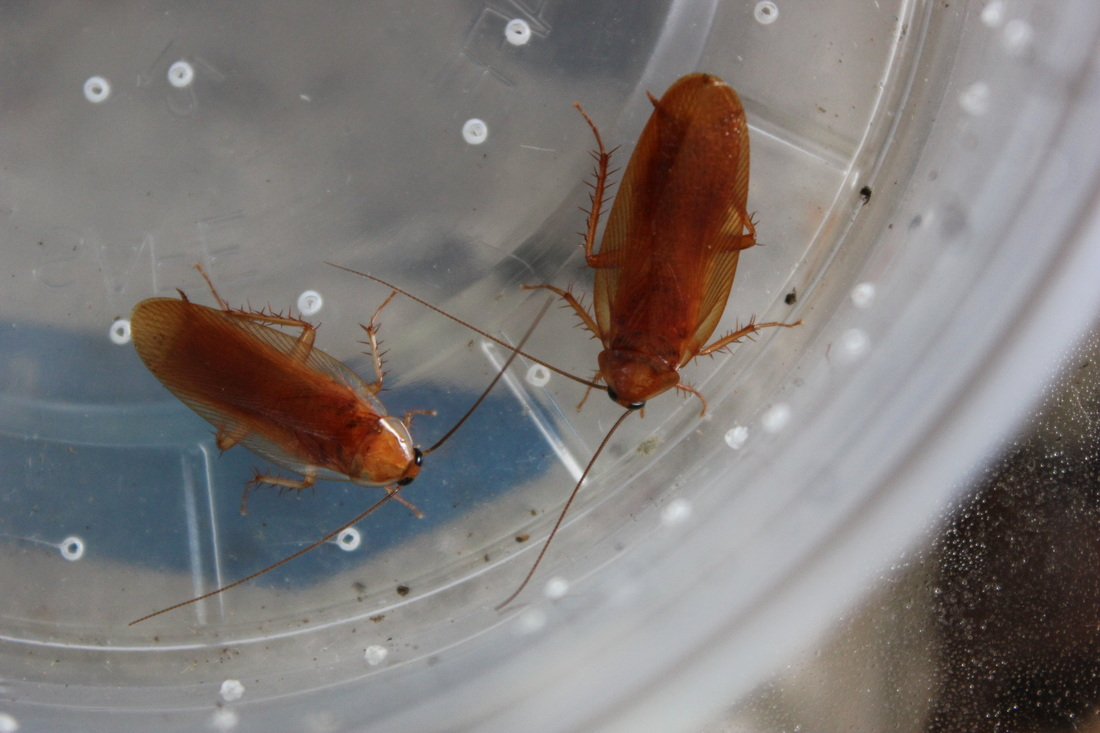
Adult male Parcoblatta uhleriana on the right with an unidentified species of Parcoblatta on the left. Both from North Carolina.

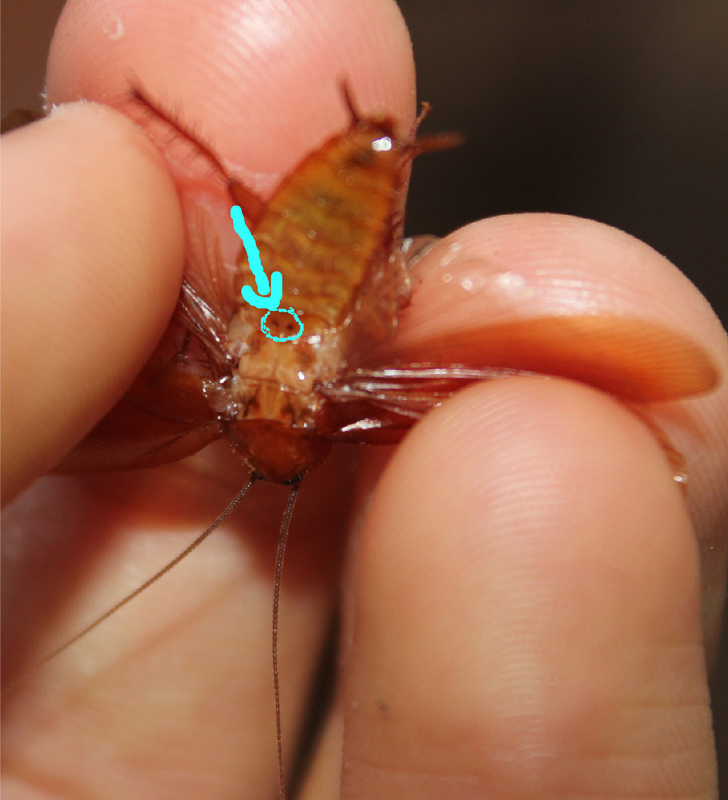
Picture of an adult male showing the modified structures underneath wings.

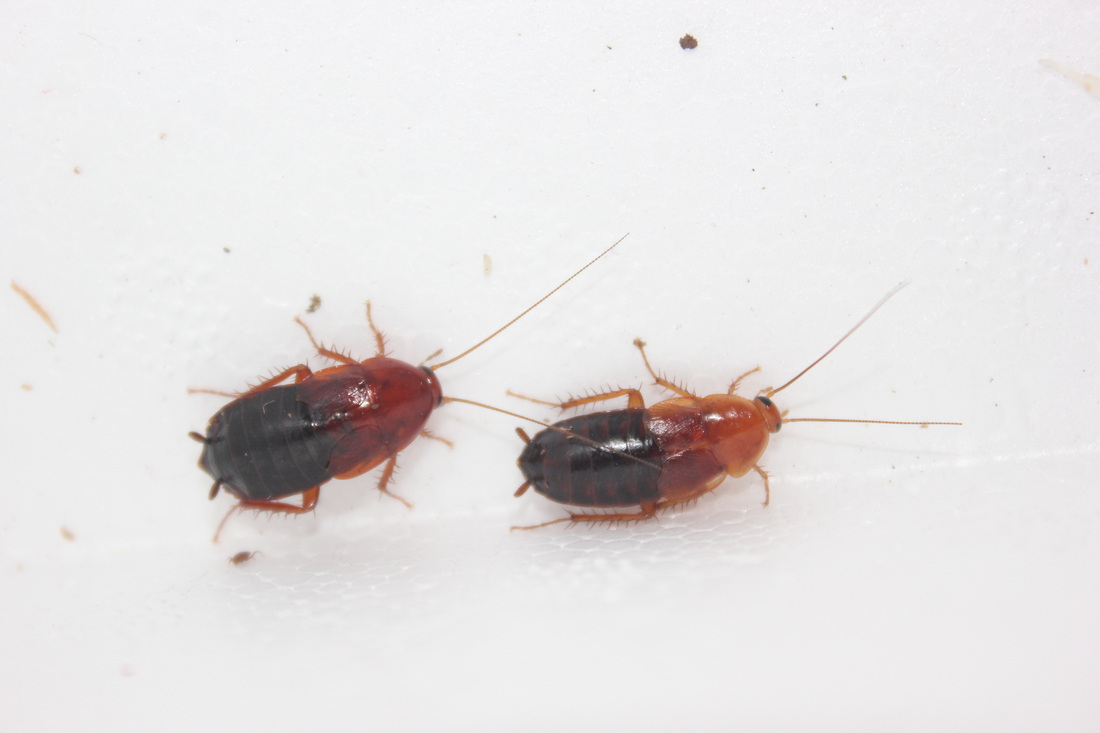
Light colored Parcoblatta uhleriana adult female (on the left) beside an unidentified species of Parcoblatta (on the right). Both are from North Carolina.

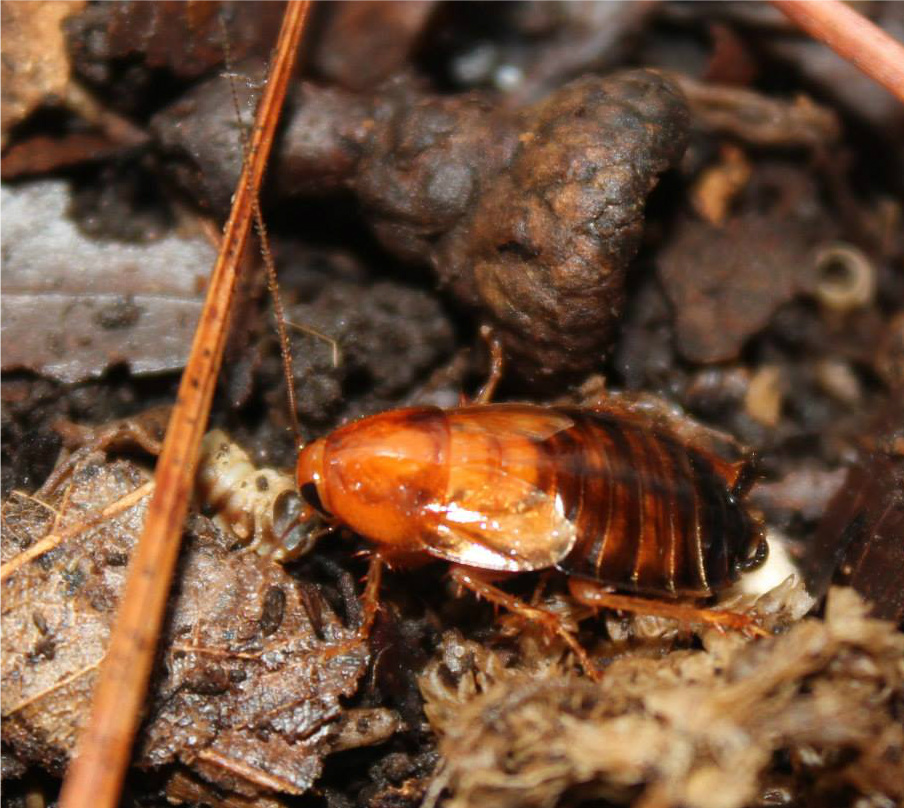
Recently molted adult female.
