= Parcoblatta desertae =

Scientific classification
- Kingdom: Animalia
- Phylum: Arthropoda
- Clade: Pancrustacea
- Class: Insecta
- Order: Blattodea
- Family: Ectobiidae
- Genus: Parcoblatta
- Species: P. desertae

Binomial name
- Parcoblatta desertae (Rehn and Hebard, 1909)

Synonyms
- Temnopteryx desertae Rehn, J. A. G. & Hebard 1909; Ischnoptera insolita Rehn, J. A. G. & Hebard, 1910

Species of cockroach

Parcoblatta desertae, the desert wood cockroach or desert cockroach, is a species of Parcoblatta endemic to the United States state of Texas.

== Description ==
The tegmina (outer forewings) and inner wings of the male are normal and fully developed, while in the female, the tegmina reach only the base of the median abdominal segment, and the inner wings are small, vestigial pads.

Male coloration is a generally dull, light ochre color, with blackish brown eyes, semi-transparent dull ochre tegmina, and hyaline (glassy) wings.

Female coloration is described twice in Morgan Hebard's 1917 description, separately describing the female type specimen, which he noted was smaller and paler than three other female specimens, which he thought was probably due to decidedly reduced vegetation in the area from which it was taken. The female type specimen was described as having a dull ochre-orange coloration on the head, pronotum, and underside of the abdomen, with sides of the pronotum (the plate behind the head) and its transparent tegmina a dull ochre, and the mesonotum (plate behind the pronotum), metanotum (plate behind the mesonotum), and back of its abdomen a russet color. Other female specimens were more intensely colored, with the head, pronotum, mesonotum and metanotum a russet color, the pronotum shading to ochre-tawny on its sides, the abdomen a shining blackish-brown, and the tegmina mostly a transparent russet.

Hebard's 1917 description included measurement ranges based on 7 male specimens and 4 female specimens:

| | Male | Female |
|---|---|---|
| Body length | 11.3–13.8 mm (0.44–0.54 in) | 9.5–11.6 mm (0.37–0.46 in) |
| Pronotum length | 2.8–3.3 mm (0.11–0.13 in) | 3.0–3.6 mm (0.12–0.14 in) |
| Pronotum width | 3.8–4.3 mm (0.15–0.17 in) | 4.2–4.8 mm (0.17–0.19 in) |
| Tegmina length | 11.2–14.5 mm (0.44–0.57 in) | 3.0–3.5 mm (0.12–0.14 in) |
| Tegmina width | 3.6–4.8 mm (0.14–0.19 in) | 2.1–2.3 mm (0.083–0.091 in) |

=== Distinguishing characteristics ===
Among males of the species, the dorsal surface (back) of the abdomen is unspecialized, a characteristic shared with only one other species of the genus Parcoblatta, Parcoblatta bolliana. Males of species are distinguished by P. desertae having a pale head, moderately decided sulci (grooves) on its pronotum, and a distance between its compound eyes much wider than that between its ocelli, while the P. bolliana has a dark head, very decided sulci on its pronotum, and a distance between its compound eyes no wider than that between its ocelli.

Among females of the species, the most similar member of the genus is Parcoblatta uhleriana; females of both species have wings, but significantly reduced tegmina. Distinguishing characteristics are that female P. desertae are generally pale-colored, have elongate subtriangular tegmina, and the edges of their supra-anal plates form a broad, weak triangular shape at the base of their cerci, while female P. uhleriana are rust-colored to very dark, have roundly subtriangular tegmina, and the edges of their supra-anal plates converge in a weakly concave fashion.

== Distribution and habitat ==
The species is known only in the south-central US state of Texas, in central, south-central, and western parts of the state. Specimens in Hebard's 1917 description were collected from the Chisos Mountains, Shovel Mountain in Burnet County, the Nueces River in Zavala County, and the towns of Fort Davis, Johnstone (in Val Verde County), Rio Frio, and Sabinal.

The species occurs in desert and semidesert mountainous areas. It has been found on the ground "in dry-creek bed through scrub, pine, and juniper forest", it is rarely found on the desert floor, and the type species was found under a boulder in bare desert, a common strategy of desert-inhabiting animals to avoid the extremes of desert climates.

== See also ==
- List of cockroaches of Texas
