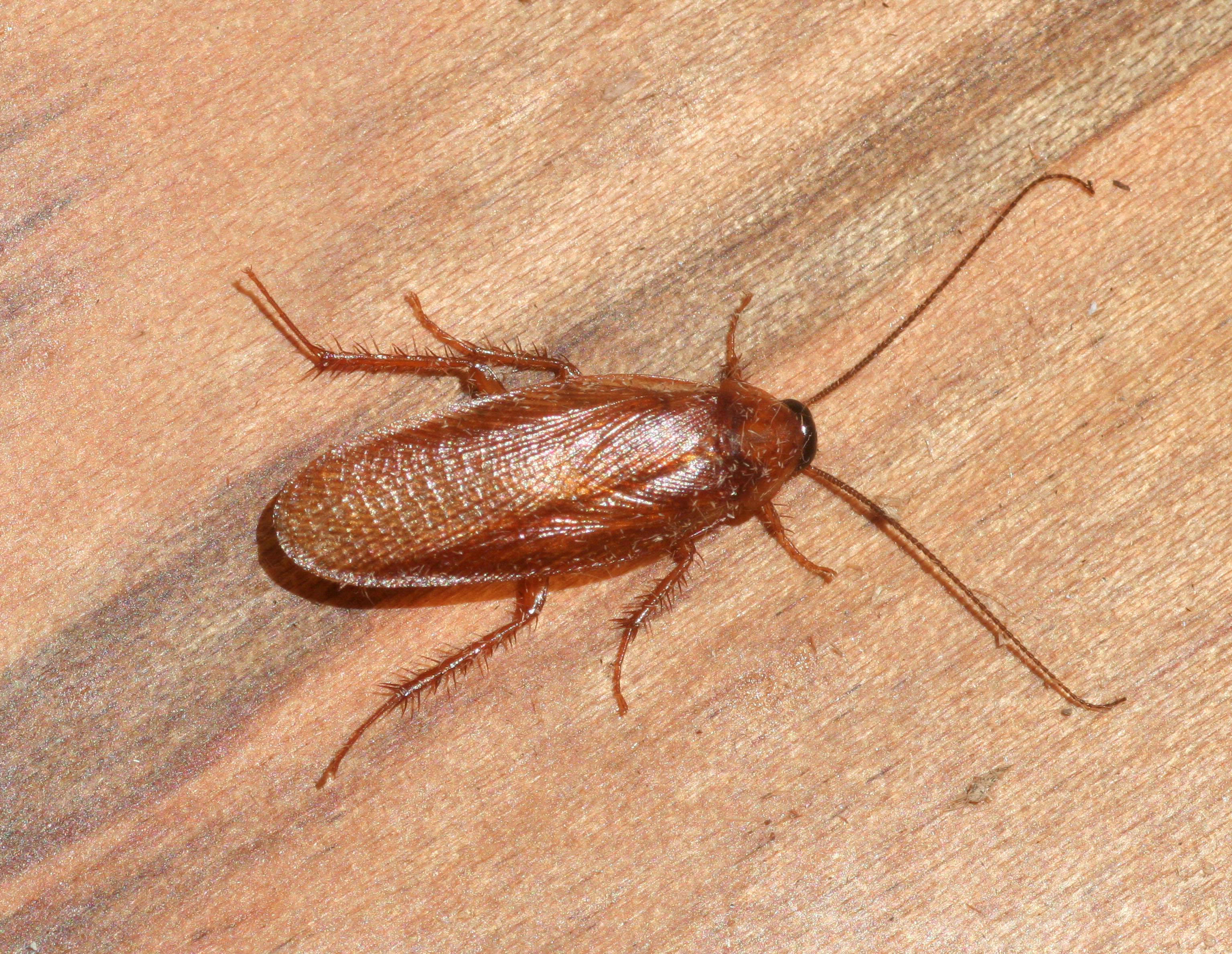
- Parcoblatta virginica

Scientific classification
- Kingdom: Animalia
- Phylum: Arthropoda
- Clade: Pancrustacea
- Class: Insecta
- Order: Blattodea
- Family: Ectobiidae
- Subfamily: Blattellinae
- Genus: Parcoblatta

Species
- Parcoblatta americana Parcoblatta bolliana Parcoblatta caudelli Parcoblatta desertae Parcoblatta divisa Parcoblatta fulvescens Parcoblatta lata Parcoblatta notha Parcoblatta pennsylvanica Parcoblatta uhleriana Parcoblatta virginica Parcoblatta zebra

= Parcoblatta =

Genus of cockroaches

Parcoblatta is a genus of 12 species of native North American wood cockroaches. The males often have wings and are drawn to lights, while the females are flightless.
