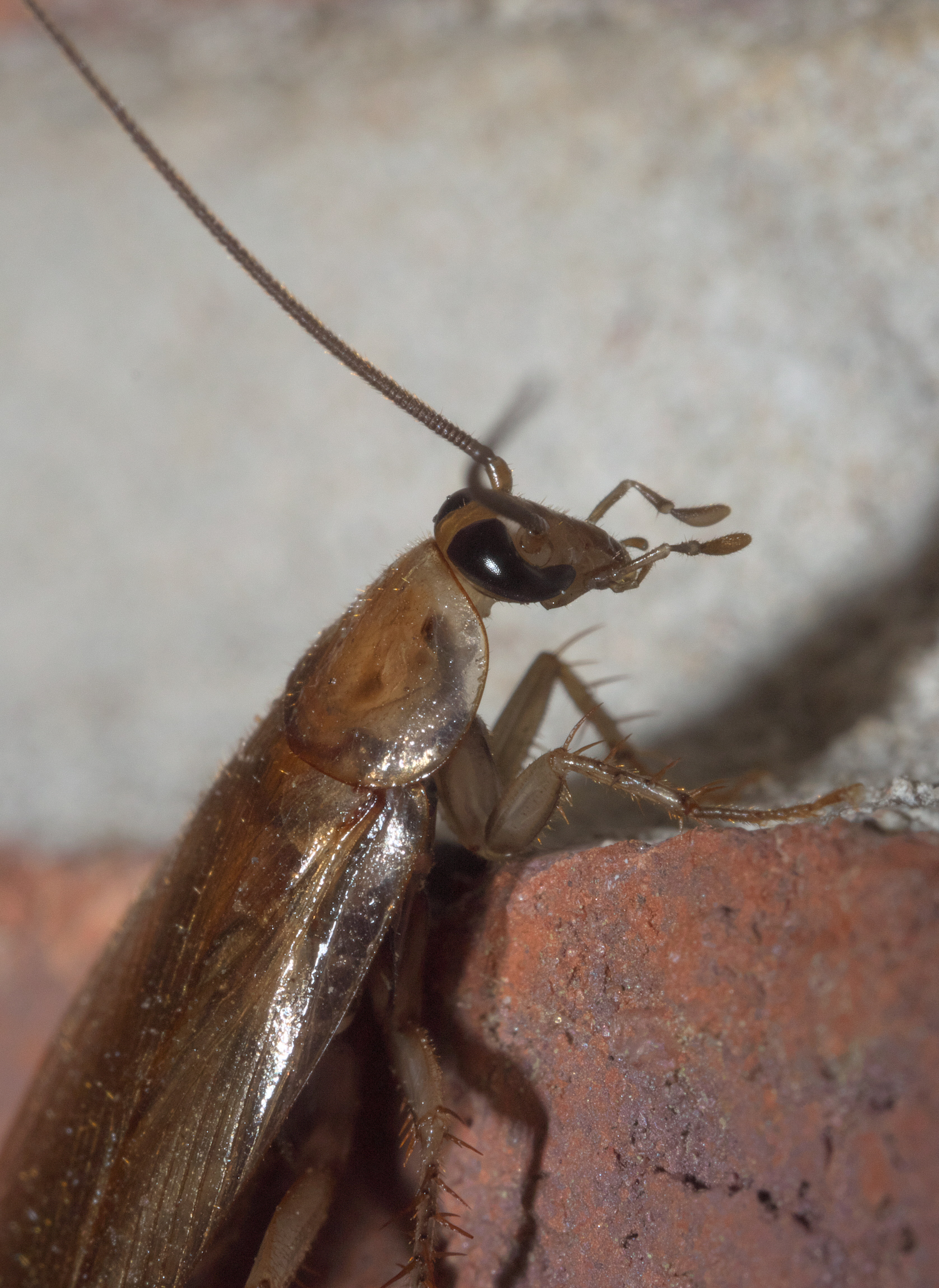
- Banded wood cockroach (Parcoblatta zebra)

Scientific classification
- Kingdom: Animalia
- Phylum: Arthropoda
- Clade: Pancrustacea
- Class: Insecta
- Order: Blattodea
- Family: Ectobiidae
- Genus: Parcoblatta
- Species: P. zebra

Binomial name
- Parcoblatta zebra Hebard, 1917

Synonyms
- (None)

= Parcoblatta zebra =

Species of cockroach

Parcoblatta zebra, the banded wood cockroach, is a species of Parcoblatta native to the United States. It has dark transverse bands across the back of its abdomen.

== Description ==
The male of the species has a distinctive specialization of its median segment, which has a heavy tuft of agglutinated (stuck together) hairs directed toward its head, and a low, hairy ridge across the segment in front of the tuft. The specialization occurs only in one other Parcoblatta species, P. americana, but is "decidedly greater" in P. zebra.

The male pronotum is elliptical, widest at the middle, and its back edge, sides, and all its angles are rounded. Its tegmina are fully developed, and delicate in structure. The space between its compound eyes is about a third of the distance between its antennal sockets.

Coloration of the male includes a dull yellow head, including its ocelli (simple eye spots), with a vertical "prout's brown" stripe from between the ocelli down to the middle of the clypeus at the bottom of the face The disc of the pronotum (the plate behind the head) is a reddish-brown, its sides are a translucent yellow, and the back fourth is a darker brown. The tegmina (outer forewings) are a transparent, brownish-yellow. Its underside and cerci (two rear appendages) are dark brown. Its legs are yellow. The base of each abdominal segment on its back has a dark band across it, while the rear half is pale.

The female is larger and more robust than the male, although its somewhat tegmina are shorter, ending at the fifth abdominal segment, and it is incapable of sustained flight. Its pronotum is widest near the base, and the back edge is slightly rounded. The space between its compound eyes is much broader than in the male.

Coloration of the female includes a yellow head, with a transverse brown bar between the antennae. The disc of its pronotum and its tegmina are both reddish-brown with transparent yellow sides. Its legs, sides and middle of the underside of its abdomen, and the back half of each abdominal segment on its back are yellow. The front half of its dorsal abdominal segments are dark, a transverse banding that is unique among females of the genus Parcoblatta.

	Male	Female
Body length	13.0–16.0 mm (0.51–0.63 in)	11.5–14.5 mm (0.45–0.57 in)
Pronotum length	3.1–3.7 mm (0.12–0.15 in)	3.7–3.9 mm (0.15–0.15 in)
Pronotum width	3.9–4.7 mm (0.15–0.19 in)	4.8–5.2 mm (0.19–0.20 in)
Tegmina length	13.9–16.1 mm (0.55–0.63 in)	6.9–7.7 mm (0.27–0.30 in)
Tegmina width	4.3–5.4 mm (0.17–0.21 in)	3.6–3.8 mm (0.14–0.15 in)

== Distribution ==
The species is known in Alabama, Illinois, Indiana, Louisiana, Mississippi, Tennessee, Texas. It may also occur in New Mexico.

== Habitat ==
Specimens have been found in the cavity of a dead sweet gum tree, under a sign on a shortleaf pine, and beneath a log in a cypress swamp.
