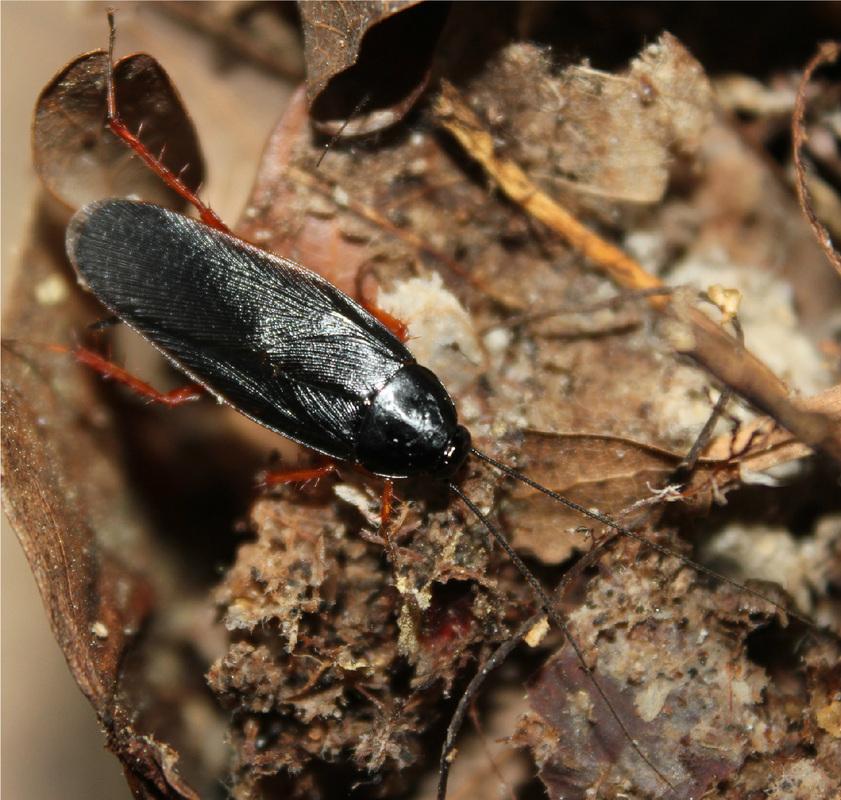
- Adult male Ischnoptera deropeltiformis

Scientific classification
- Kingdom: Animalia
- Phylum: Arthropoda
- Clade: Pancrustacea
- Class: Insecta
- Order: Blattodea
- Family: Ectobiidae
- Subfamily: Blattellinae
- Genus: Ischnoptera; Burmeister, 1838

= Ischnoptera =

Genus of cockroach

Ischnoptera is a genus of cockroach in the family Ectobiidae.

== Species ==
These 98 species belong to the genus Ischnoptera:

- Ischnoptera aglandis Roth, 2001
- Ischnoptera amazonica Rehn, 1916
- Ischnoptera angustifrons Hebard, 1916
- Ischnoptera anisopygia Shelford, 1913
- Ischnoptera apolinari Hebard, 1919
- Ischnoptera argentina Hebard, 1921
- Ischnoptera atrata Hebard, 1916
- Ischnoptera azteca Saussure, 1862
- Ischnoptera bahiana Rocha e Silva & Fraga, 1976
- Ischnoptera bergrothi (Griffini, 1896)
- Ischnoptera bicolorata Lopes & Oliveira, 2005
- Ischnoptera bicornuta Hebard, 1922
- Ischnoptera bilunata Saussure, 1869
- Ischnoptera borellii (Giglio-Tos, 1897)
- Ischnoptera brachyptera Princis, 1951
- Ischnoptera brasiliana Rocha e Silva, 1984
- Ischnoptera brattstroemi Princis, 1952
- Ischnoptera brunnea Rocha e Silva, 1964
- Ischnoptera caborojoensis Roth, 2001
- Ischnoptera campana Rocha e Silva & Fraga, 1976
- Ischnoptera carcarana Hebard, 1921
- Ischnoptera castanea Saussure, 1869
- Ischnoptera chichicastenanga Roth, 2001
- Ischnoptera clavator Rehn, 1918
- Ischnoptera colombiae Hebard, 1919
- Ischnoptera crispula Rehn, 1918
- Ischnoptera cristata Lopes, 2009
- Ischnoptera darlingtoni Gurney, 1942
- Ischnoptera deropeltiformis (Brunner von Wattenwyl, 1865) (dark wood cockroach)
- Ischnoptera escalerae Shelford, 1909
- Ischnoptera flagellifer Hebard, 1921
- Ischnoptera fulvipennis Princis, 1951
- Ischnoptera galibi Hebard, 1926
- Ischnoptera gatunae Hebard, 1920
- Ischnoptera hebes Walker, 1868
- Ischnoptera hercules Rehn, 1928
- Ischnoptera icano Hebard, 1921
- Ischnoptera ignobilis Saussure, 1864
- Ischnoptera iguabense Oliveira & Lopes, 2011
- Ischnoptera ikonnikovi Shelford, 1913
- Ischnoptera imparata Rehn, 1918
- Ischnoptera implicata Hebard, 1921
- Ischnoptera inca Saussure & Zehntner, 1893
- Ischnoptera inclusa Rocha e Silva, 1968
- Ischnoptera inusitata (Rocha e Silva, 1971)
- Ischnoptera irregulata Lopes, 2009
- Ischnoptera josephina Giglio-Tos, 1898
- Ischnoptera lestrelleta Roth, 2001
- Ischnoptera ligula Rehn & Hebard, 1927
- Ischnoptera linguiforma Roth, 2001
- Ischnoptera litostylata Hebard, 1921
- Ischnoptera marginata Brunner von Wattenwyl, 1865
- Ischnoptera melasa Walker, 1868
- Ischnoptera mexicana Saussure, 1862
- Ischnoptera mirella Hebard, 1920
- Ischnoptera miuda Lopes, 2009
- Ischnoptera morio Burmeister, 1838
- Ischnoptera moxa Shelford, 1913
- Ischnoptera mura Rehn, 1932
- Ischnoptera nana Saussure & Zehntner, 1893
- Ischnoptera neglecta Shelford, 1913
- Ischnoptera neoclavator Rocha e Silva, 1964
- Ischnoptera neomelasa Rocha e Silva, 1984
- Ischnoptera nigra Rocha e Silva & Fraga, 1976
- Ischnoptera nox Hebard, 1920
- Ischnoptera ocularis Saussure, 1873
- Ischnoptera oliveirai Oliveira & Lopes, 2011
- Ischnoptera oreochares Rehn & Hebard, 1927
- Ischnoptera pallipes (Scudder, 1869)
- Ischnoptera pampaconas Caudell, 1913
- Ischnoptera panamae Hebard, 1920
- Ischnoptera pantaneira Lopes, 2009
- Ischnoptera paradoxa Rocha e Silva & Lopes, 1977
- Ischnoptera paramacca Hebard, 1926
- Ischnoptera parvula Saussure, 1869
- Ischnoptera peckorum Roth, 1988
- Ischnoptera peculiaris Rocha e Silva, 1973
- Ischnoptera pedernalesensis Roth, 2001
- Ischnoptera podoces Rehn & Hebard, 1927
- Ischnoptera rehni Hebard, 1926
- Ischnoptera rufa (De Geer, 1773)
- Ischnoptera rugosa Lopes & Oliveira, 2006
- Ischnoptera santacruzensis Roth, 1992
- Ischnoptera saussurei Hebard, 1921
- Ischnoptera serrana Rocha e Silva & Vasconcellos, 1987
- Ischnoptera similis Rocha e Silva & Lopes, 1977
- Ischnoptera snodgrassi (McNeill, 1901)
- Ischnoptera speciosa Rocha e Silva & Fraga, 1976
- Ischnoptera spinosostylata Princis, 1951
- Ischnoptera stygia Hebard, 1926
- Ischnoptera taczanowskii Bolívar, 1881
- Ischnoptera tolteca Saussure, 1868
- Ischnoptera tristylata Rocha e Silva & Lopes, 1977
- Ischnoptera undulifera Walker, 1871
- Ischnoptera variegata Rocha e Silva & Lopes, 1977
- Ischnoptera vilis Saussure, 1869
- Ischnoptera vulpina Hebard, 1916
- Ischnoptera zacualtipana Roth, 2001
