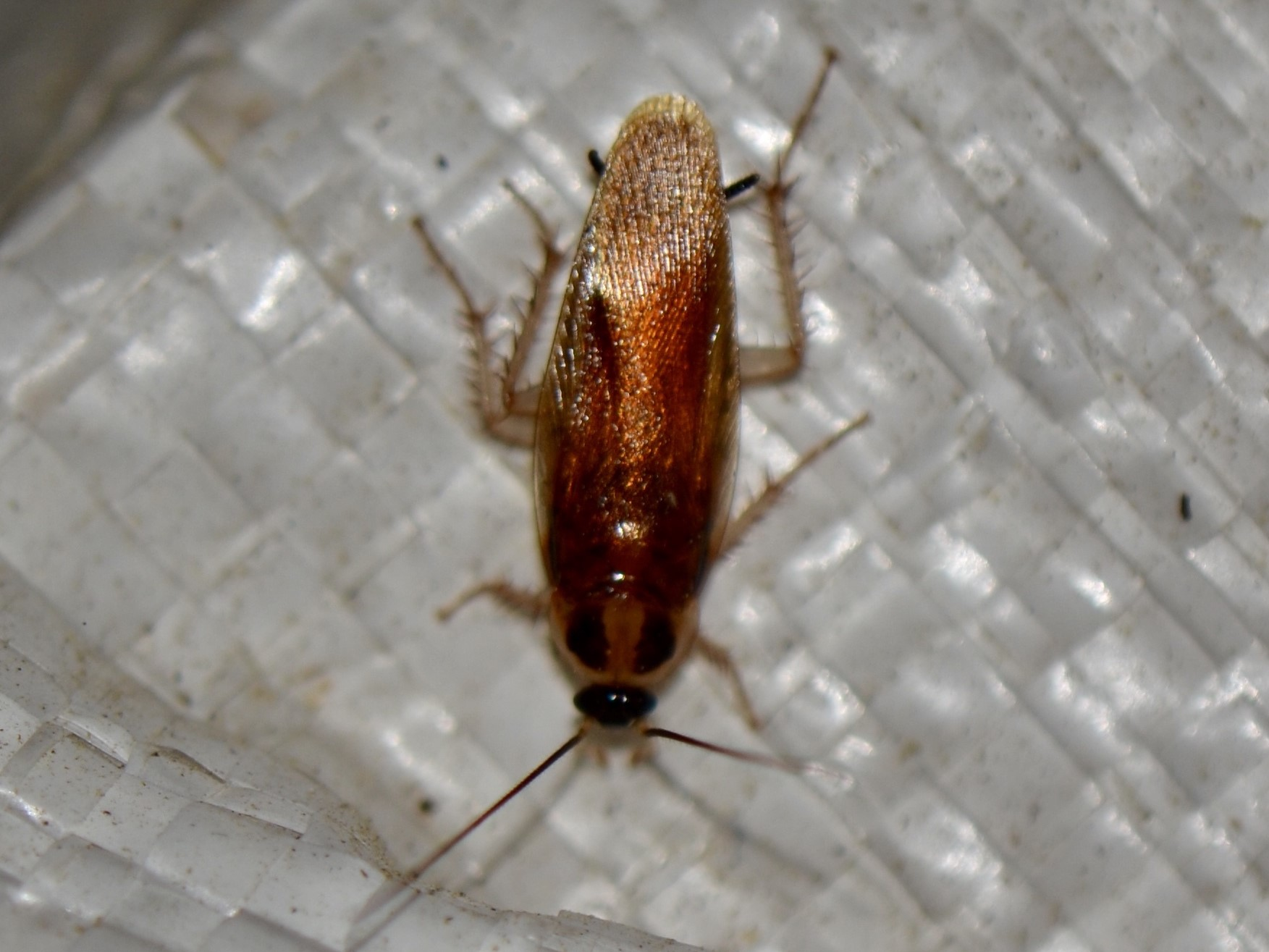

Scientific classification
- Kingdom: Animalia
- Phylum: Arthropoda
- Clade: Pancrustacea
- Class: Insecta
- Order: Blattodea
- Family: Ectobiidae
- Genus: Ischnoptera
- Species: I. bilunata

Binomial name
- Ischnoptera bilunata Saussure, 1869

= Ischnoptera bilunata =

Species of cockroach

Ischnoptera bilunata is a species of cockroach in the family Ectobiidae. It is found in North America and South America.
