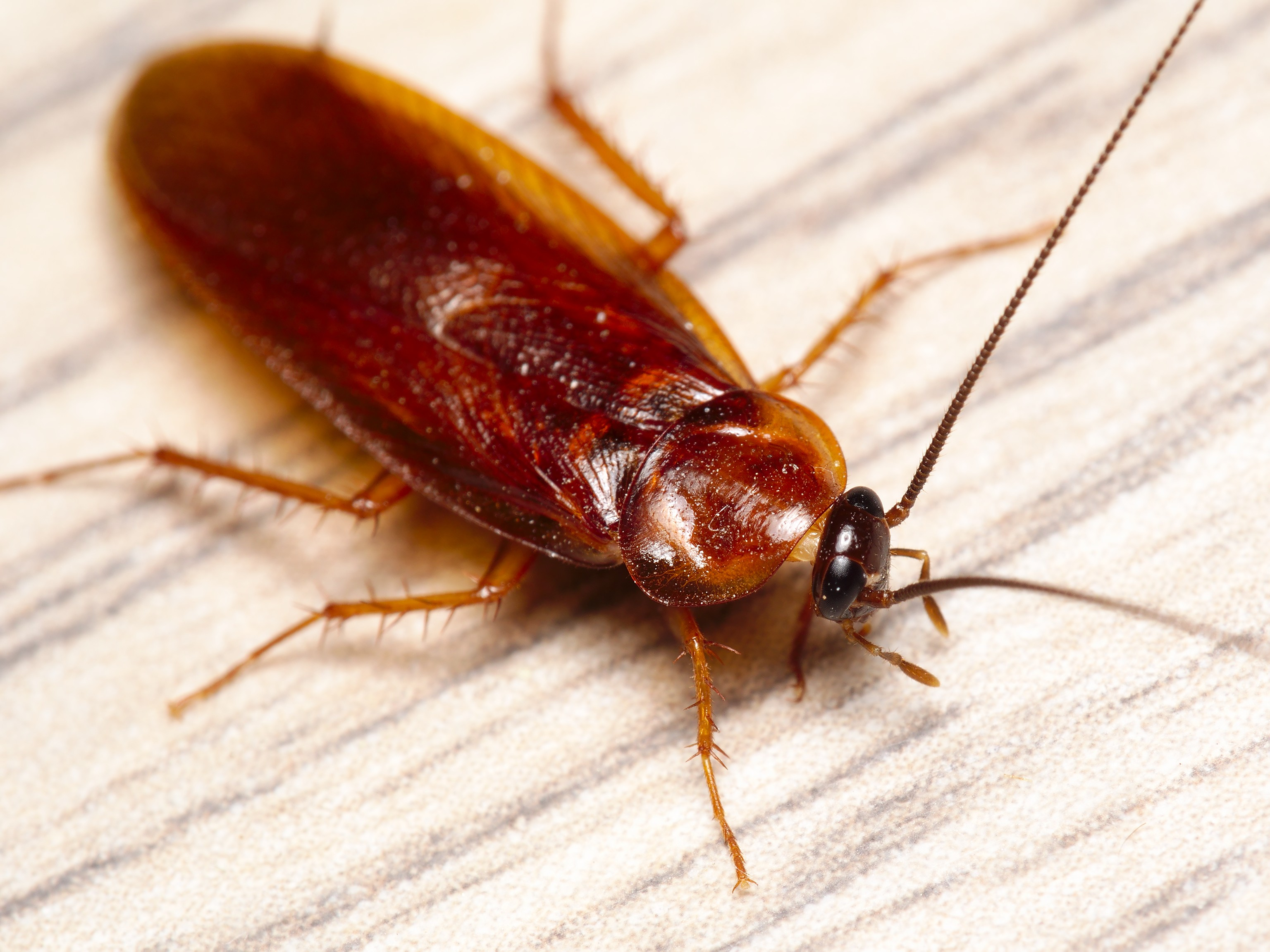

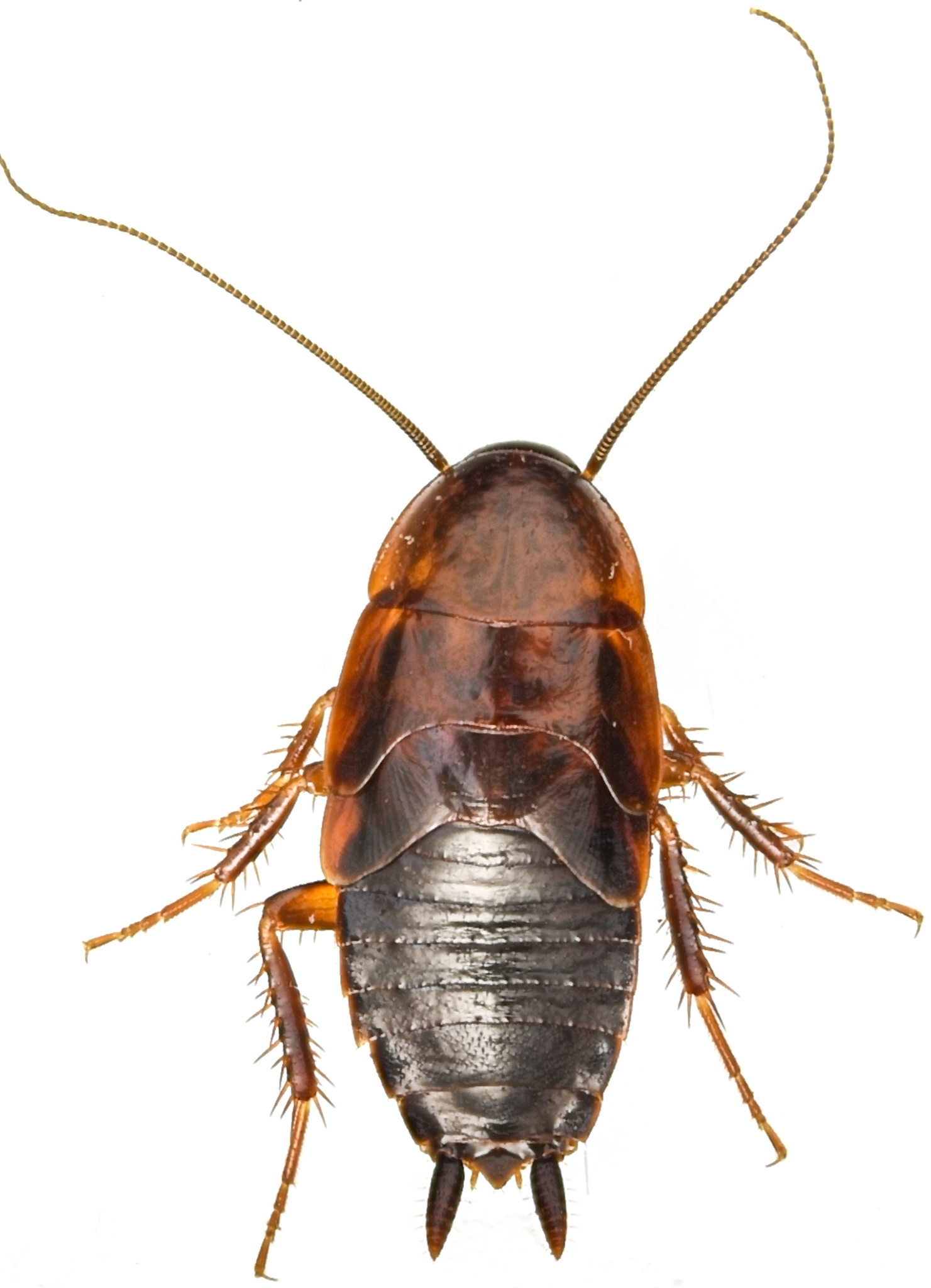

Scientific classification
- Kingdom: Animalia
- Phylum: Arthropoda
- Clade: Pancrustacea
- Class: Insecta
- Order: Blattodea
- Family: Ectobiidae
- Genus: Parcoblatta
- Species: P. americana

Binomial name
- Parcoblatta americana (Scudder, 1900) or (Scudder, 1901)

Synonyms
- Loboptera americana Scudder 1900

= Parcoblatta americana =

Species of cockroach

Parcoblatta americana, the western wood cockroach, is a species of wood cockroach that occurs in Mexico and the western United States.

== Description ==
The species has significant size and color variation, thought to be due to environmental conditions, particularly the effect of aridity.

The male of the species has normal, fully developed tegmina and wings, and a tuft of hairs on the back of its middle abdomen. The general coloration in the male can vary from shining dark brown or blackish to a pale yellowish to slightly reddish tan. The tegmina are translucent in all colorations, and the ocelli (simple eye spots) are a yellowish tan.

Females of the species have very greatly reduced tegmina, represented by lobe-like lateral pads, and no hind wings. The female general coloration ranges from a shining reddish orange or brown, slightly darker on the back of the abdomen, to a shining dark brown, or shining black with blackish brown underparts. The ocelli are tannish in all colorations.

Morgan Hebard's 1917 description included measurement ranges based on 14 male specimens and 7 female specimens:

	Male	Female
Body length	12.0–14.8 mm (0.47–0.58 in)	8.8–13.3 mm (0.35–0.52 in)
Pronotum length	2.8–3.7 mm (0.11–0.15 in)	2.8–3.9 mm (0.11–0.15 in)
Pronotum width	3.8–4.6 mm (0.15–0.18 in)	3.8–5.7 mm (0.15–0.22 in)
Tegmina length	13.6–15.2 mm (0.54–0.60 in)	1.4–2.4 mm (0.055–0.094 in)
Tegmina width	4.2–5.3 mm (0.17–0.21 in)	1.6–2.2 mm (0.063–0.087 in)

=== Distinguishing characteristics ===
The male P. americana has a single specialized area on its abdomen, on the back of its median segment, in the form of a tuft of agglutinated hairs. Parcoblatta zebra is the only other male of the genus Parcoblatta that shares this characteristic, but on P. americana the tuft is small and quadrate (squarish), with the rest of the segment showing little specialization, while on P. zebra the tuft is much broader, with the rest of the segment showing further specialization. The male Parcoblatta virginica also has a single specialized area on its abdomen, but it has minute hairs scattered over a large specialized area on the back of its median segment, rather than a tuft of agglutinated hairs.

The female Parcoblatta bolliana is the only other female of the genus Parcoblatta that has such significantly reduced tegmina and absence of hind wings. The female P. bolliana is distinguished from P. americana by its compact form, space between its compound eyes less than the space between its antennal sockets, its tegmina having few traces of venation, and its supra-anal plate weakly produced with its side edges converging to a broadly rounded apex, while the P. americana having a normal, less compact form, space between its compound eyes noticeably wider than the space between its antennal sockets, its tegmina have visible venation, its supra-anal plate is normally produced with its side edges converging to a sharply rounded apex.

== Distribution and habitat ==
The species is known in Mexico and the western United States, including Oregon, California, Nevada, and Arizona. It has also been recorded in a home in Klickitat County, Washington.

Both sexes of P. americana have been found in the nests of the Veromessor chicoensis (a harvester ant, also classified as Messor chicoensis), where they reside during the day, and emerge at night to feed on the debris pile around the nest. Nymphs of P. americana were taken from houses of pack rats (genus Neotoma) in Orange County, California. The species has been observed feeding on an apple that was six feet off the ground.

A study area in California's Santa Monica Mountains found the species to be fairly common, but localized to the area. The study found them occurring in chaparral, grassland, oak woodland, and coastal sage (Artemisia californica), and occurring as adults in early to mid summer. Females and nymphs lived on the ground, and were found under rocks, in rotting wood, in ant nests. Adult males lived separately from females and nymphs; they were attracted to light, and would sometimes perch on chaparral plants at night.
