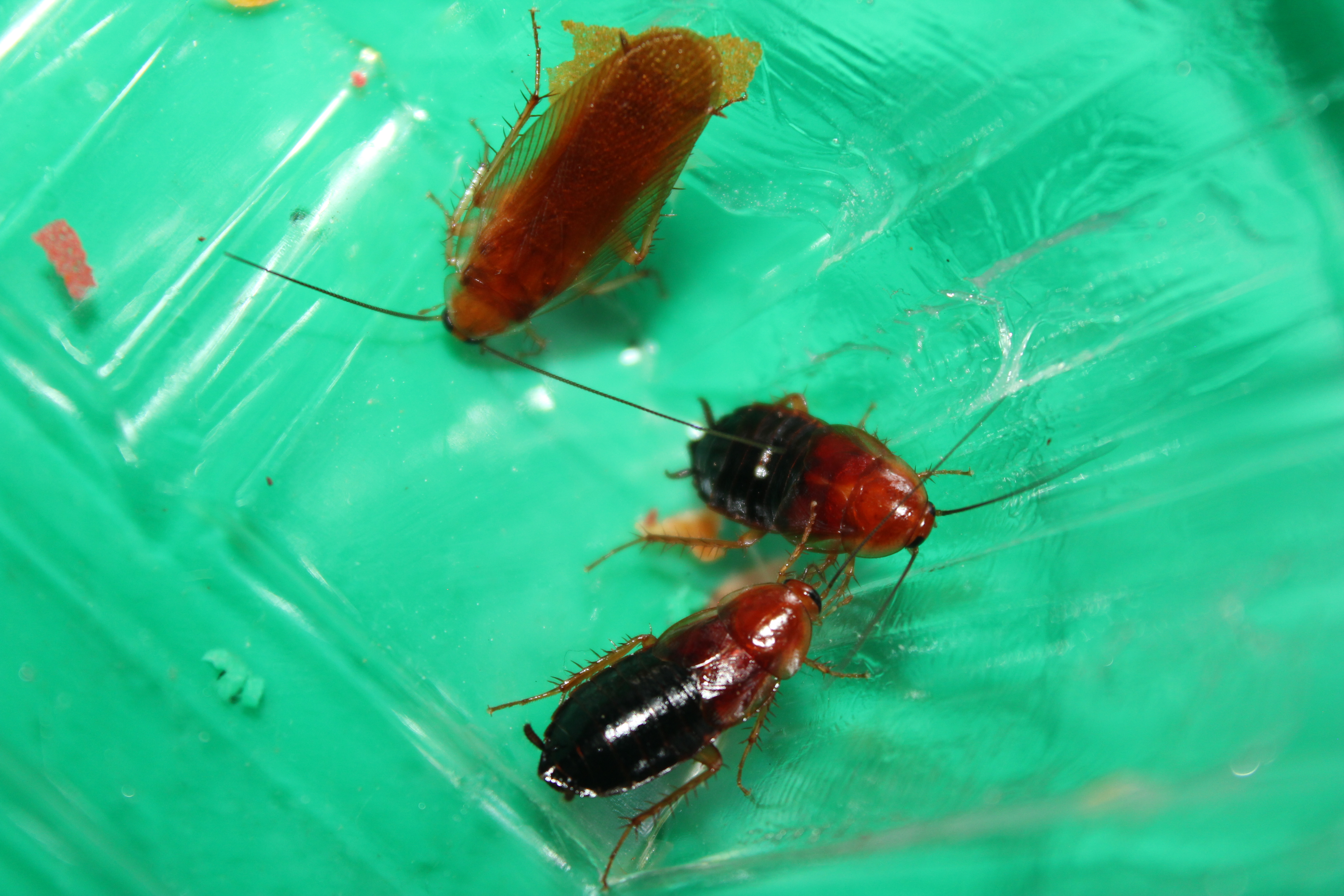

Scientific classification
- Kingdom: Animalia
- Phylum: Arthropoda
- Clade: Pancrustacea
- Class: Insecta
- Order: Blattodea
- Family: Ectobiidae
- Genus: Parcoblatta
- Species: P. caudelli

Binomial name
- Parcoblatta caudelli Hebard, 1917

Synonyms
- Ischnoptera insolita Rehn, J. A. G. & Hebard, 1910

= Parcoblatta caudelli =

Species of cockroach

Parcoblatta caudelli, Caudell's wood cockroach or Caudell's wood roach, is a species of cockroach native to the United States.

The male of the species has a pale clay-yellow head, underside, and legs. The back of its abdomen, pronotum disc, occiput (X), and a transverse bar in the middle of its face are a brownish-yellow. Tegmina are fully developed, and are slightly wider than the pronotum. It has long, thin cerci. While the species is the smallest of the pale brown species of the genus Parcoblatta, its abdomen is modified like Parcoblatta lata, the largest of the genus.

Fred A. Lawson wrote in 1967 that the female is fully winged and capable of flight, a trait he stated was unique among the Parcoblatta species in the United States, while a 2003 study involving P. caudelli caught in North Carolina characterized the female as flightless.

	Male	Female
Body length	12.2–16.0 mm (0.48–0.63 in)	10.7–12.3 mm (0.42–0.48 in)
Pronotum length	2.9–3.4 mm (0.11–0.13 in)	3.2–3.6 mm (0.13–0.14 in)
Pronotum width	3.9–4.7 mm (0.15–0.19 in)	4.1 mm (0.16 in)
Tegmina length	11.8–16.0 mm (0.46–0.63 in)	11.4–11.8 mm (0.45–0.46 in)
Tegmina width	3.9–5.2 mm (0.15–0.20 in)	3.8–4.0 mm (0.15–0.16 in)

== Distribution ==
The distribution of the species is the United States, in Arkansas, the District of Columbia, Indiana, Mississippi, North Carolina, Texas, and Virginia. The species is considered adventive, but not established, in Ontario, Canada.

== Habitat ==
The species is common in forested areas, and one researcher collected specimens from an old sawdust pile, at a former sawmill on the University of Tennessee Farm.
