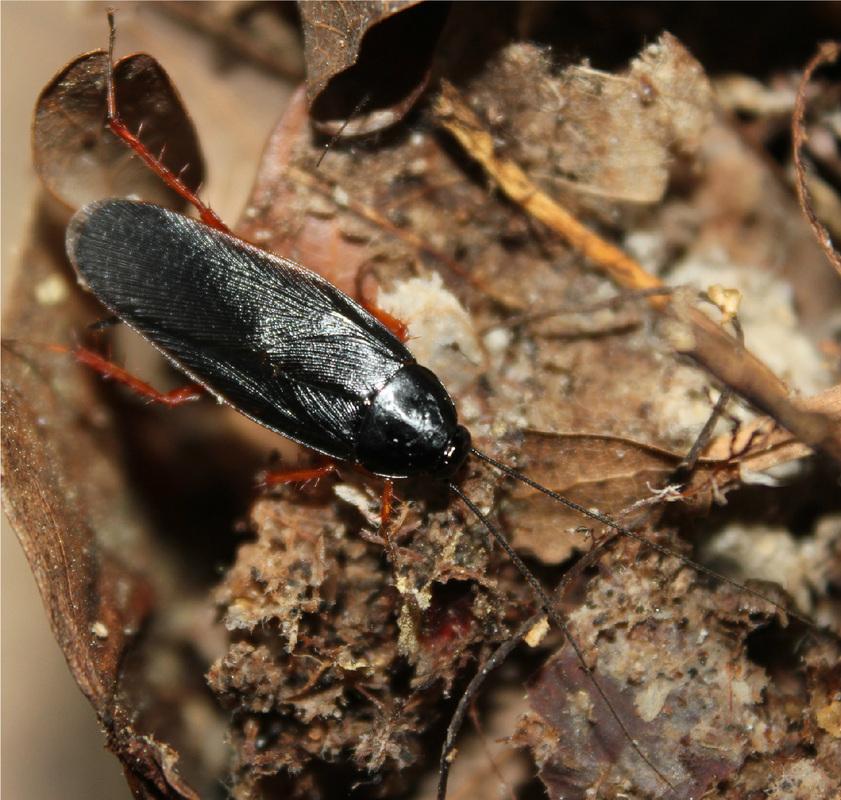
- Adult male
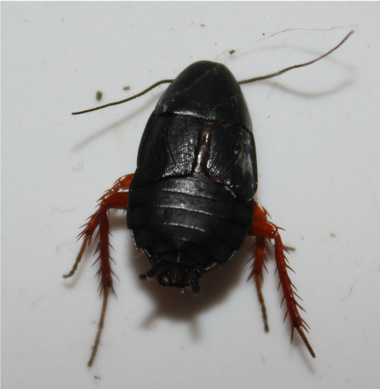
- Adult female

Scientific classification
- Kingdom: Animalia
- Phylum: Arthropoda
- Clade: Pancrustacea
- Class: Insecta
- Order: Blattodea
- Family: Ectobiidae
- Genus: Ischnoptera
- Species: I. deropeltiformis

Binomial name
- Ischnoptera deropeltiformis (Brunner von Wattenwyl, 1865)

Synonyms
- Ischnoptera intricata Blatchley, 1903; Ischnoptera johnsoni Rehn, 1903; Ischnoptera nigricollis Walker, 1868

= Ischnoptera deropeltiformis =

Species of cockroach

Ischnoptera deropeltiformis, the dark wood roach, is a species of wood cockroach (family Ectobiidae) native to the United States.

== Additional images ==
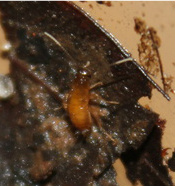
1st instar nymph
