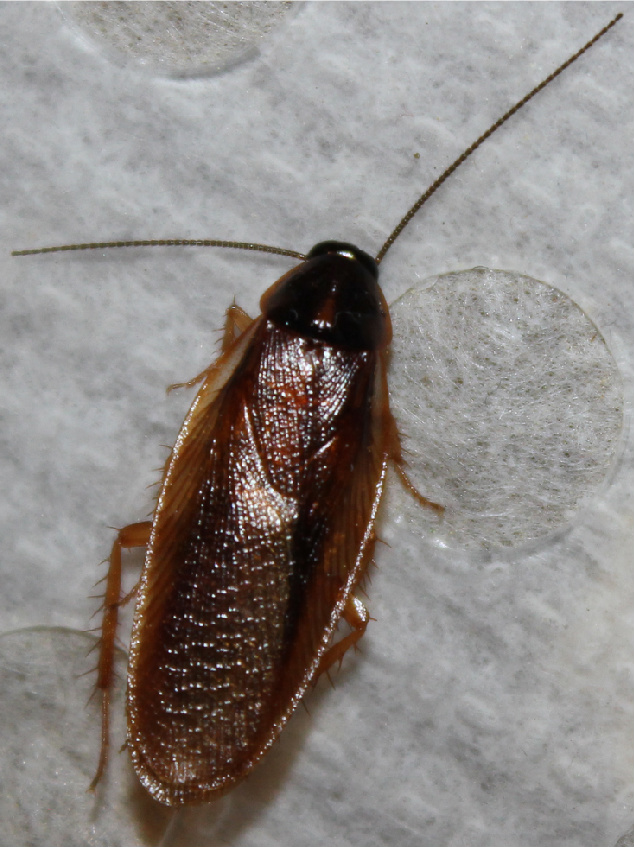
- Adult male P. bolliana
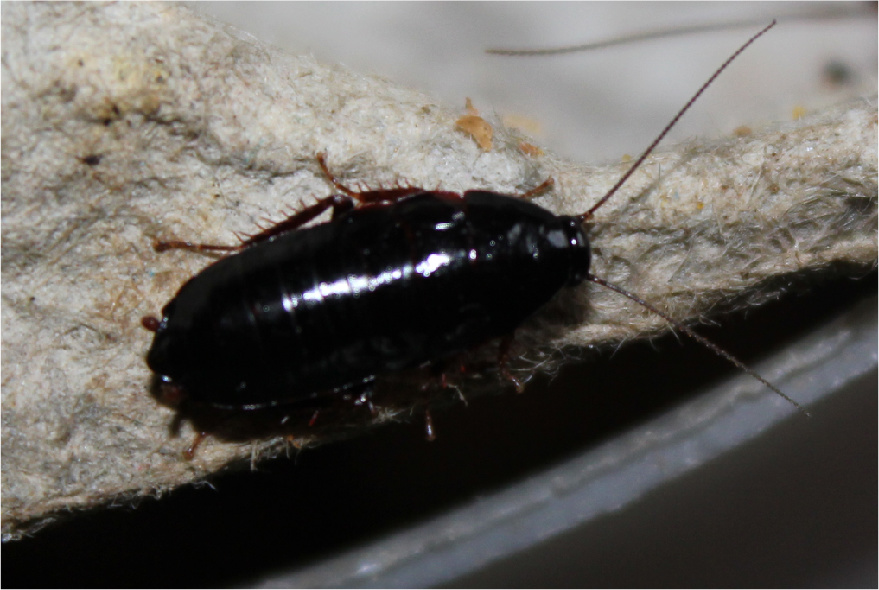
- Adult female Parcoblatta bolliana

Scientific classification
- Kingdom: Animalia
- Phylum: Arthropoda
- Clade: Pancrustacea
- Class: Insecta
- Order: Blattodea
- Family: Ectobiidae
- Genus: Parcoblatta
- Species: P. bolliana

Binomial name
- Parcoblatta bolliana (Saussure & Zehntner, 1893)

Synonyms
- Kakerlac schaefferi Rehn, J. A. G., 1904; Ischnoptera bolliana Saussure & Zehntner, 1893

= Parcoblatta bolliana =

Species of cockroach

Parcoblatta bolliana, Boll's wood cockroach or Boll's wood roach, is a small species of wood cockroach native to the United States, measuring around 11 mm (0.43 in) long.

== Description ==
Parcoblatta bolliana is a small, slender species. The male has long tegmina (outer forewings) and functioning hindwings, while the female tegmina are small oblong pads separated by more than twice their width, and its inner hindwings are absent. The female is stouter and more compact than the male, with a broader head and pronotum (the large plate directly behind the head).

The male has a shining, dark brown head, pronotum disc, and base of tegmina, with fine and sparse yellowish hairs. It has paler brown legs, edges of the sides of its pronotum, and ends of its tegmina. Its ocelli (simple eyes) are well defined and colored a dull yellow. Its pronotum has two oblique impressions near its base, connected by a short transverse impression.

The female is chocolate brown, and its legs are generally darker than those of the male. Its ocelli are small spots, and its pronotum is widest just behind its middle.

Specimens become much paler in the western part of its range, sometimes with only the head being dark.

	Male	Female
Body length	10.1–12.8 mm (0.40–0.50 in)	9.0–10.7 mm (0.35–0.42 in)
Pronotum length	2.7–3.0 mm (0.11–0.12 in)	2.9–3.0 mm (0.11–0.12 in)
Pronotum width	3.6–4.2 mm (0.14–0.17 in)	3.9–4.4 mm (0.15–0.17 in)
Tegmina length	11.7–13.6 mm (0.46–0.54 in)	1.7–1.9 mm (0.067–0.075 in)
Tegmina width	3.8–4.6 mm (0.15–0.18 in)	1.4–1.7 mm (0.055–0.067 in)

== Distribution ==
The distribution of the species is limited to the United States, including Alabama, Georgia, Illinois, Iowa, Kansas, Louisiana, Missouri, Nebraska, North Carolina, Oklahoma, South Carolina, and Texas.

== Habitat ==
The species has been found under pine straw in pine woods in North Carolina, under dry cow dung in pine woods in Texas, beneath a pile of old boards in Nebraska, and extensively in grassland areas of Kansas, both in tall prairie grass as well as shorter grass.

Tiny nymphs of the species, apparently first instar, have consistently been found living in the nests of the ant species Cremastogastor lineloata in Kansas. The ant often lives in the soil beneath large rocks. Adults of the cockroach species have not been found in the nests, but the young nymphs are raised among C. lineolata workers without apparent harm.

== Additional images ==
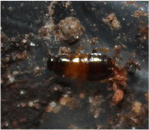
A young nymph

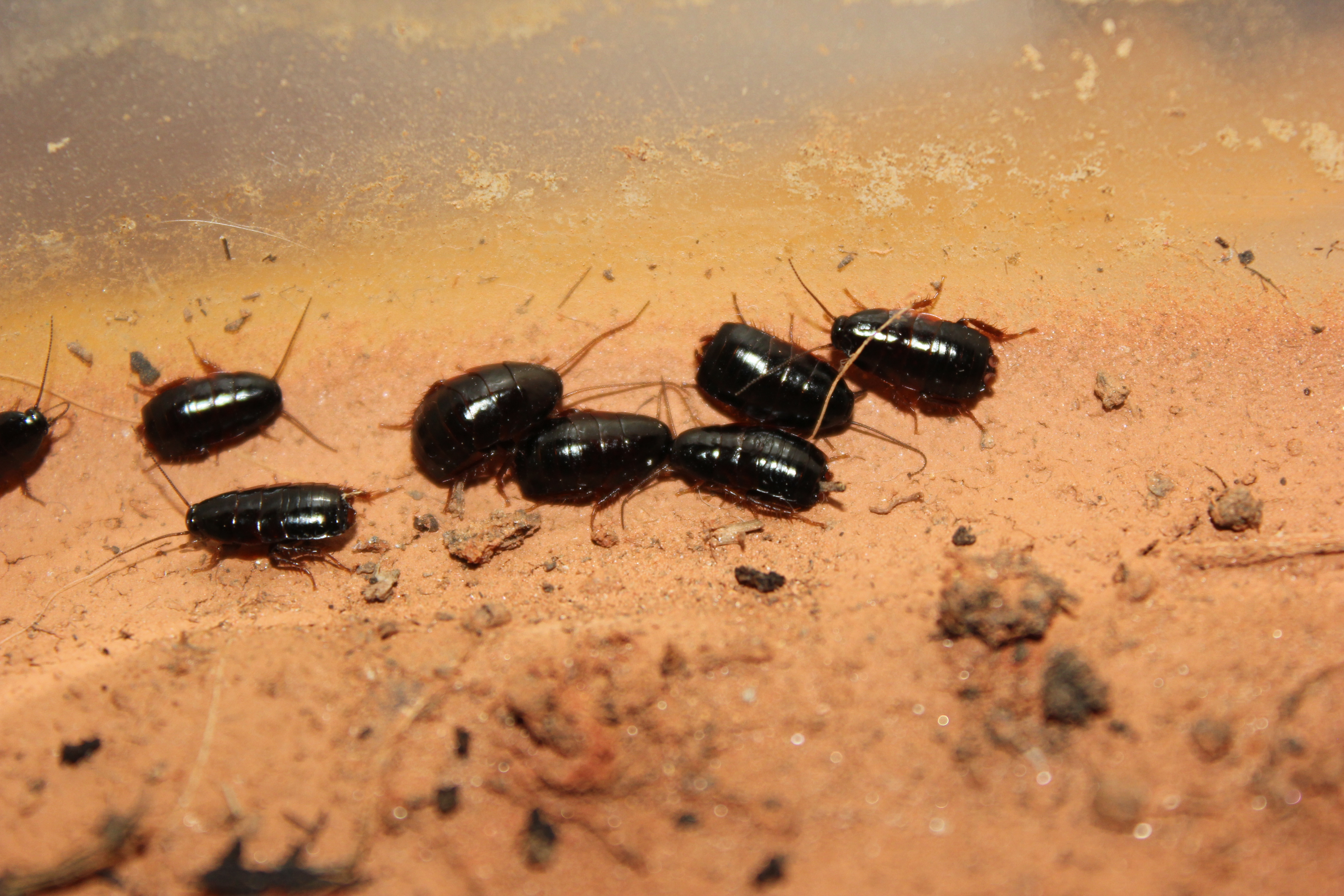
Nymphs of P. bolliana. Possibly some in this photo are Parcoblatta uhleriana.
