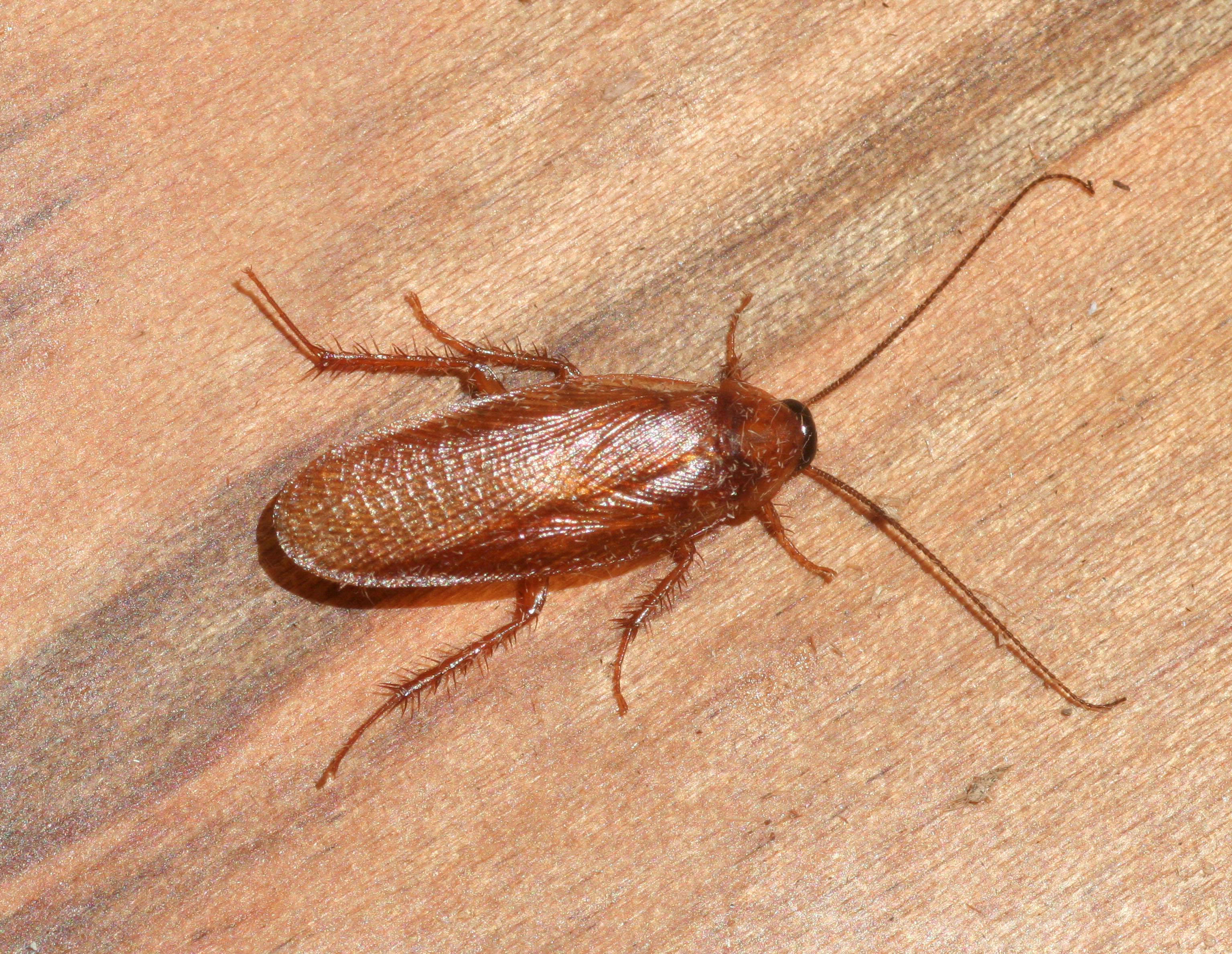
- Adult male

Scientific classification
- Kingdom: Animalia
- Phylum: Arthropoda
- Clade: Pancrustacea
- Class: Insecta
- Order: Blattodea
- Family: Ectobiidae
- Genus: Parcoblatta
- Species: P. virginica

Binomial name
- Parcoblatta virginica (Brunner von Wattenwyl, 1865)

Synonyms
- Ischnoptera borealis Brunner von Wattenwyl 1865; Temnopteryx virginica Brunner von Wattenwyl 1865

= Parcoblatta virginica =

Species of insect

Parcoblatta virginica, the Virginia wood cockroach, is a small cockroach species of the genus Parcoblatta, measuring about a centimeter long as an adult.

== Description ==
Adult males of this species like adult males of several other species of Parcoblatta are full winged and orangish in color. Adult females are brachypterous and can be from rusty brown to almost black. Nymphs can be brown to black. Adults and older nymphs usually have a blackish or dark stained head.

	Male	Female
Body length	11.5–15.4 mm (0.45–0.61 in)	10.3–12.5 mm (0.41–0.49 in)
Pronotum length	2.7–3.6 mm (0.11–0.14 in)	3.2–3.8 mm (0.13–0.15 in)
Pronotum width	3.4–4.4 mm (0.13–0.17 in)	4.1–4.9 mm (0.16–0.19 in)
Tegmina length	12.8–16.7 mm (0.50–0.66 in)	3.3–4.9 mm (0.13–0.19 in)
Tegmina width	4.3–5.7 mm (0.17–0.22 in)	2.7–3.3 mm (0.11–0.13 in)

== Ecology ==
These roaches live in leaf litter and rotting wood, and are dependant on the moisture that environment provides. They may wander into the home but cannot survive there because of low humidity

== Distribution ==
The distribution of the species is limited to Ontario, Canada and the eastern United States, including Alabama, Connecticut, Florida, Georgia, Indiana, Illinois, Iowa, Kansas, Kentucky, Maine, Maryland, Massachusetts, Michigan, Minnesota, Missouri, Nebraska, New Jersey, New York, North Carolina, Oklahoma, Pennsylvania, Rhode Island, South Dakota, Texas, Vermont, Virginia, and Wisconsin.

== Additional images ==
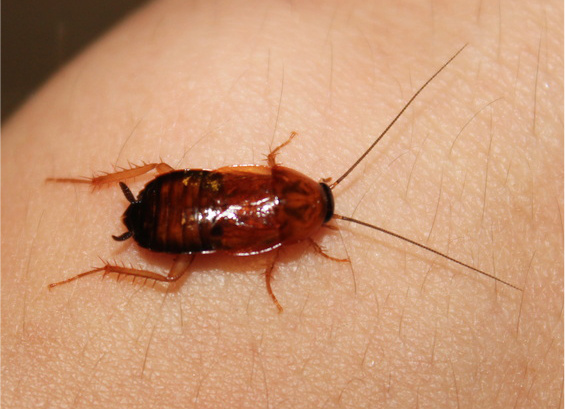
Adult female P. virginica from North Carolina
