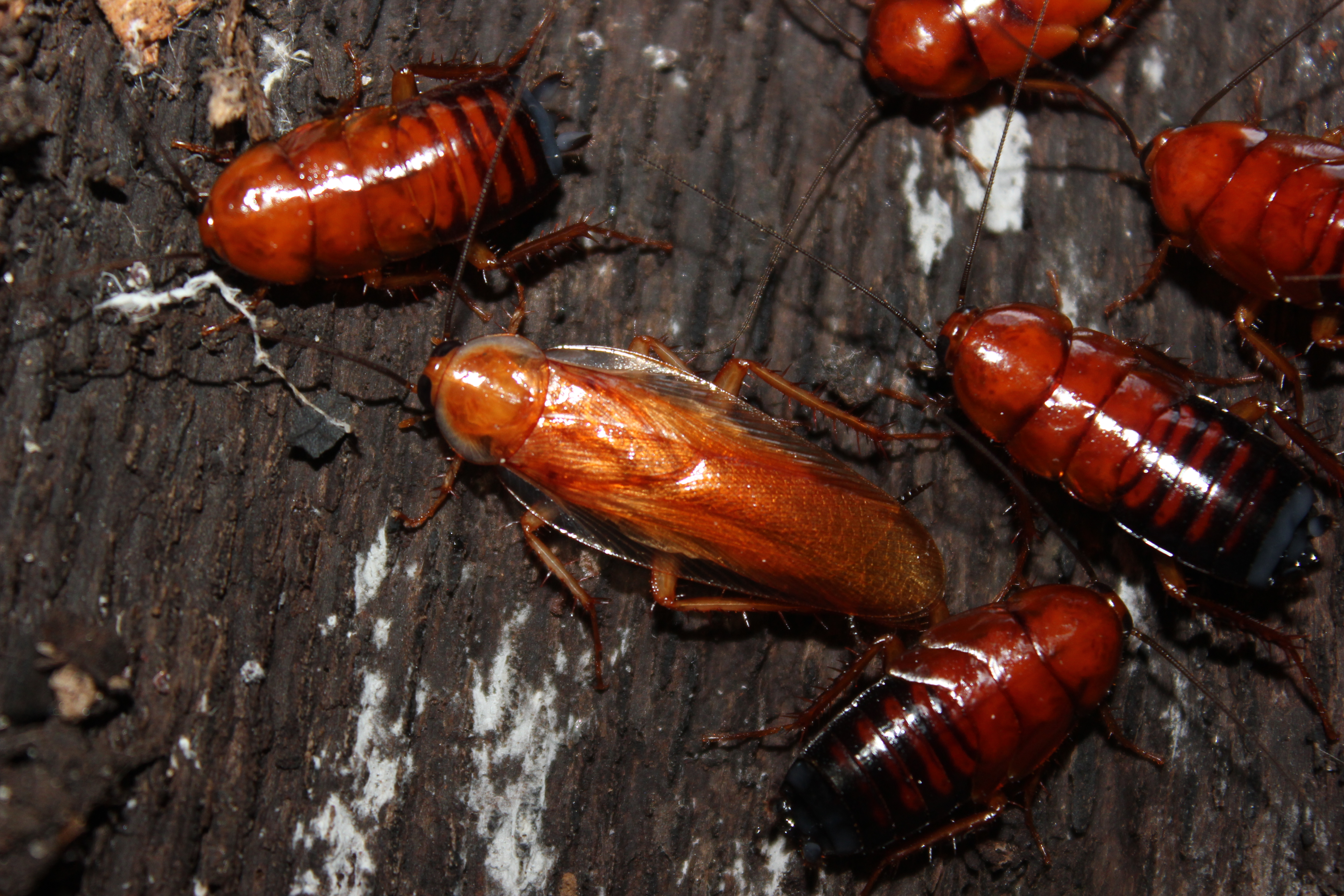
- Parcoblatta lata

Scientific classification
- Kingdom: Animalia
- Phylum: Arthropoda
- Clade: Pancrustacea
- Class: Insecta
- Order: Blattodea
- Family: Ectobiidae
- Genus: Parcoblatta
- Species: P. lata

Binomial name
- Parcoblatta lata (Brunner von Wattenwyl, 1865)

Synonyms
- Ischnoptera hyalina Scudder, 1869; Ischnoptera lata Brunner von Wattenwyl 1865; Temnopteryx major Saussure & Zehntner 1893

= Parcoblatta lata =

Species of cockroach

Parcoblatta lata, the broad wood cockroach, is a species of wood cockroach (family Ectobiidae) native to the United States. It is one of the largest species of wood cockroaches.

== Description ==
Both genders of P. lata are relatively large and robust for the genus. The male dorsal coloration of the species is a glossy light brown or reddish brown, while the female is a darker brown. The male's tegmina (outer forewings) extend well beyond the abdomen, and are wider than its pronotum. The female's short tegmina end around the second dorsal segment, and are colored slightly lighter than the rest of the body. The female is wider than the male, and has a much larger, more rounded pronotum.

	Male	Female
Body length	17.5–21.5 mm (0.69–0.85 in)	15.7–22.0 mm (0.62–0.87 in)
Pronotum length	4.1–5.2 mm (0.16–0.20 in)	4.8–6.2 mm (0.19–0.24 in)
Pronotum width	5.4–6.7 mm (0.21–0.26 in)	6.7–8.2 mm (0.26–0.32 in)
Tegmina length	17.8–22.0 mm (0.70–0.87 in)	5.9–8.0 mm (0.23–0.31 in)
Tegmina width	5.2–6.8 mm (0.20–0.27 in)	4.7–5.7 mm (0.19–0.22 in)

The ootheca typically measures around 4 mm × 9 mm (0.16 in × 0.35 in), with its seam slightly curved, having a row of about 30 evenly spaced knobs.

== Distribution ==
The distribution of the species is the Eastern United States, including Alabama, the District of Columbia, Delaware, Florida, Georgia, Illinois, Indiana, Iowa, Kansas, Kentucky, Louisiana, Maryland, Mississippi, Missouri, North Carolina, Oklahoma, South Carolina, Tennessee, Texas, and Virginia.

== Mating behavior ==
As with many cockroaches, the female Parcoblatta lata emits pheromones to find mates, a process termed calling. It assumes a characteristic calling posture by alternately raising its body upward from the ground by bending its body longitudinally, and lowering it downward by straightening its body. P. lata produces volatile, long-distance pheromones, attracting the males which can fly to the female's location. The 12 species of the genus Parcoblatta are theorized to produce species-specific blends of pheromones, although there may be other species-isolating mechanisms of attraction such as time or location. A main component of the pheromones of P. lata is an unusual lactone, (4Z,11Z)-oxacyclotrideca-4,11-dien-2-one. Discovered in 2011 and dubbed Parcoblattalactone, it is also found in other species of the genus Parcoblatta, and a synthetic version has been created for use in assessing Parcoblatta populations.

== Habitat and ecology ==
P. lata commonly inhabit forests and grasslands. They are endemic to pine forests of the southeastern US, have been found in grassland and shrub communities in Kansas, and have been found only in lowlying mesic hammocks in Florida.

The species has been reported indoors, at lights, and under wooden signs on trees.

In an observational study of the species, it was observed to eat cambium, flower petals, and sap. A survey of insects caught by the pitcher plant Saracenia flava included male specimens of four species of Parcoblatta, including P. lata, leading to speculation that the winged adults may seek nectar as a source of energy for flying.

It is a methanogenic (methane-producing) species, a trait more common in the cockroach families Blaberidae and Blattinae than in the family Blatellidae.

The species comprises more than half the biomass of the diet of the endangered red-cockaded woodpecker (Picoides borealis).

== Additional images ==
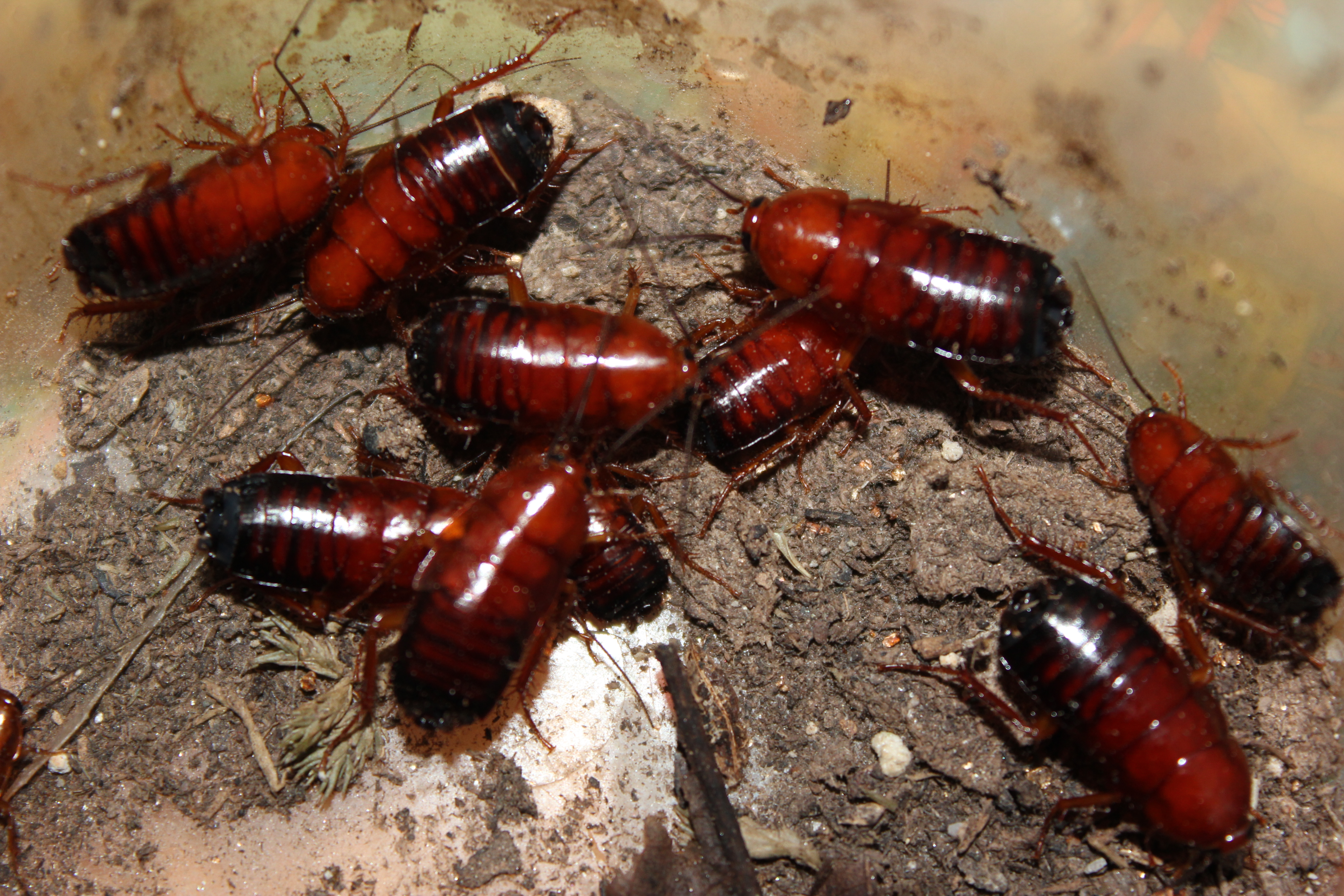
Parcoblatta lata nymphs

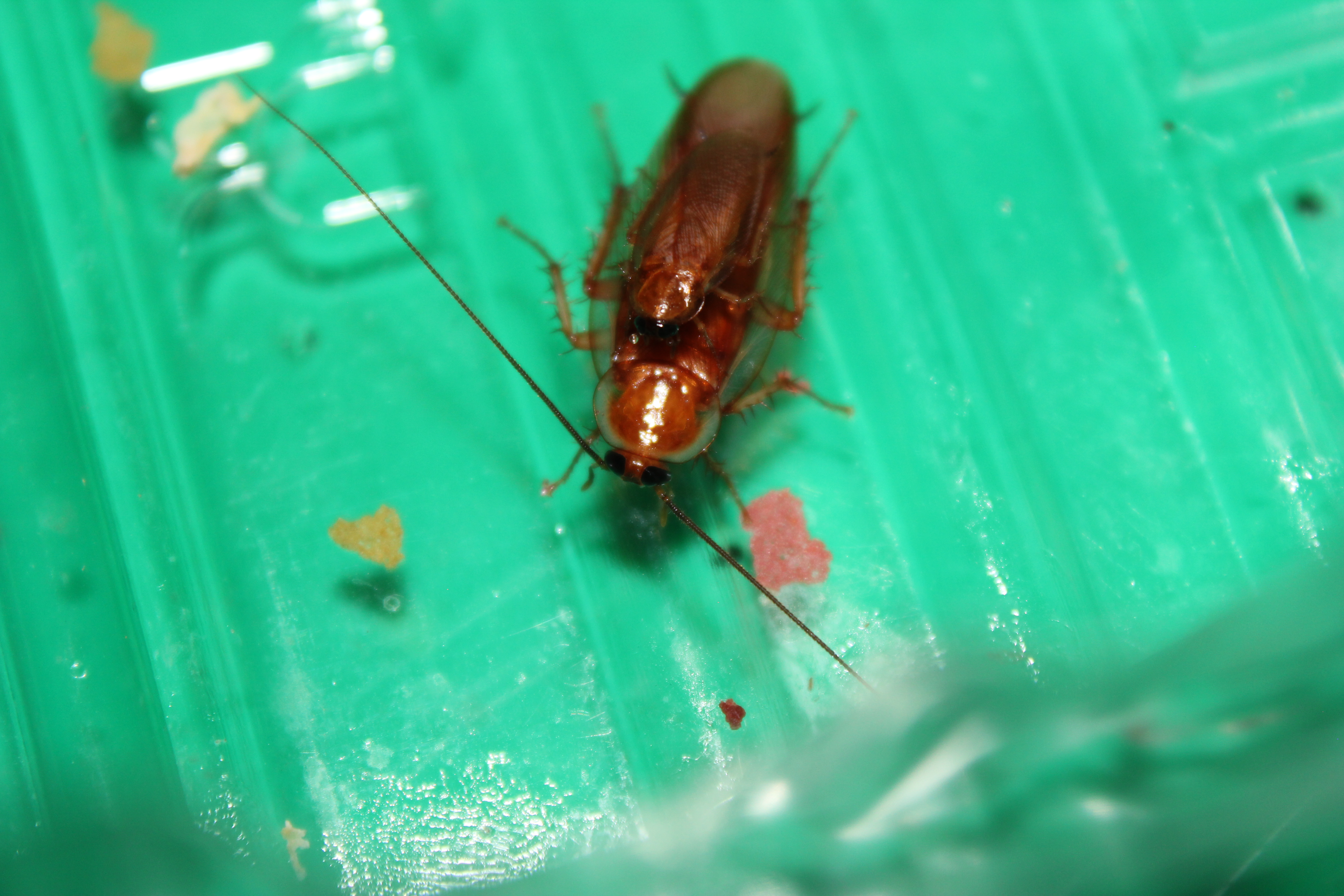
Parcoblatta virginica on top of a Parcoblatta lata. From the head to the tip of the wings the Parcoblatta lata measured 25 millimeters long and the Parcoblatta virginica 14 millimeters long.

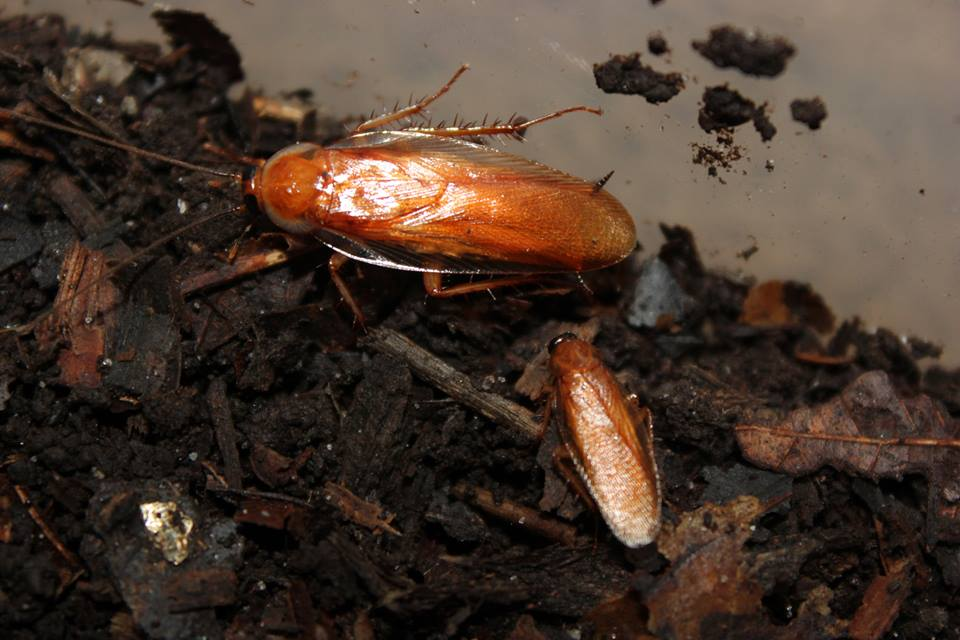
Photo showing the difference in size between Parcoblatta lata and Parcoblatta virginica adult males.

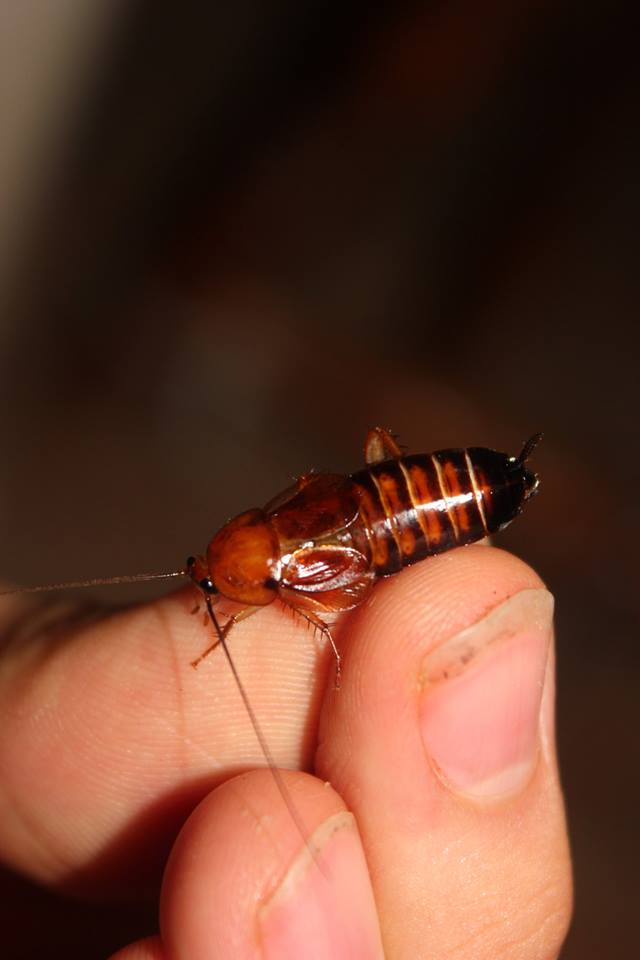
Adult female

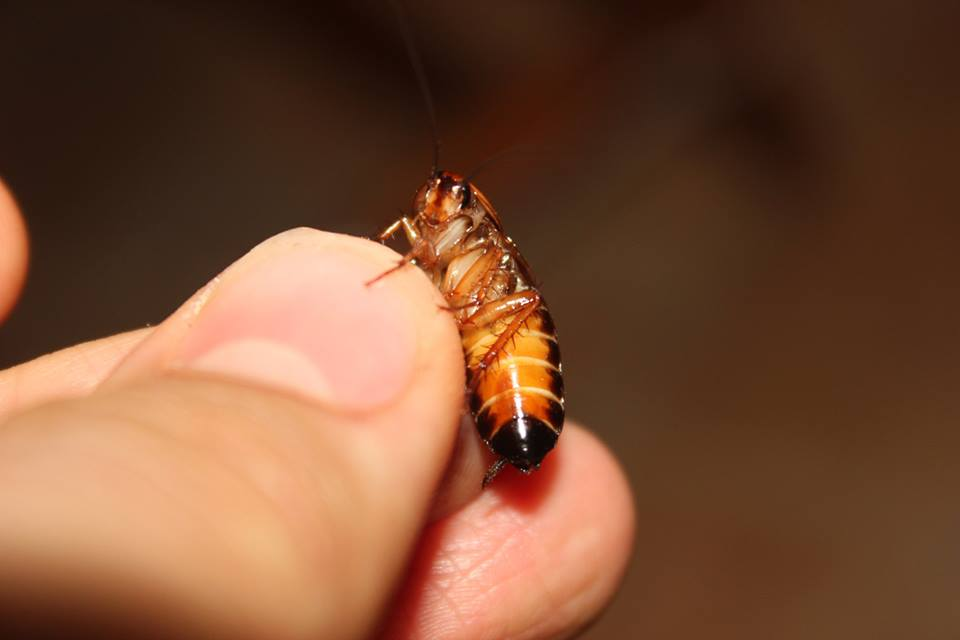
Underside of adult female

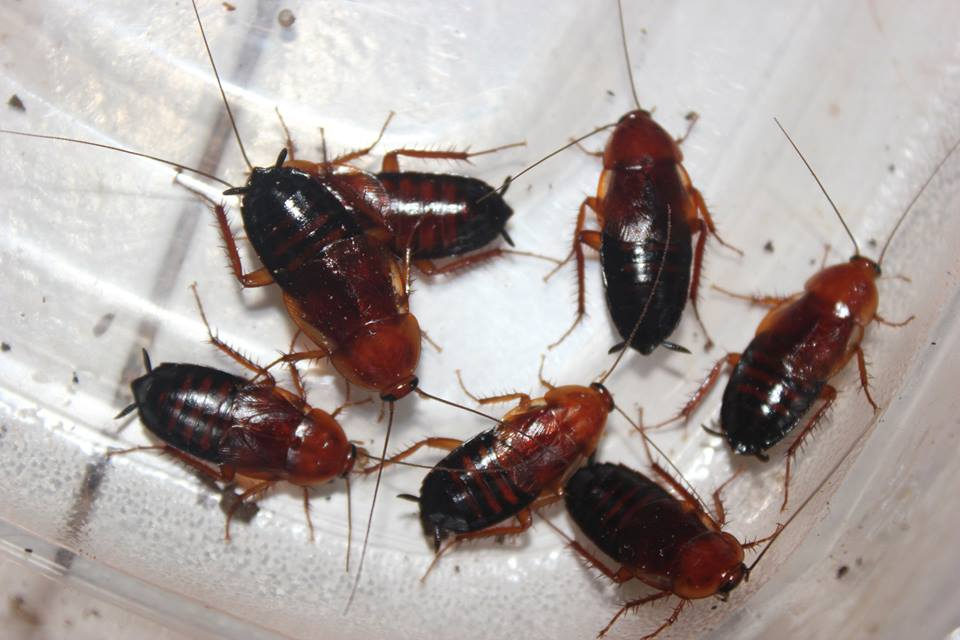
A group of adult females.
