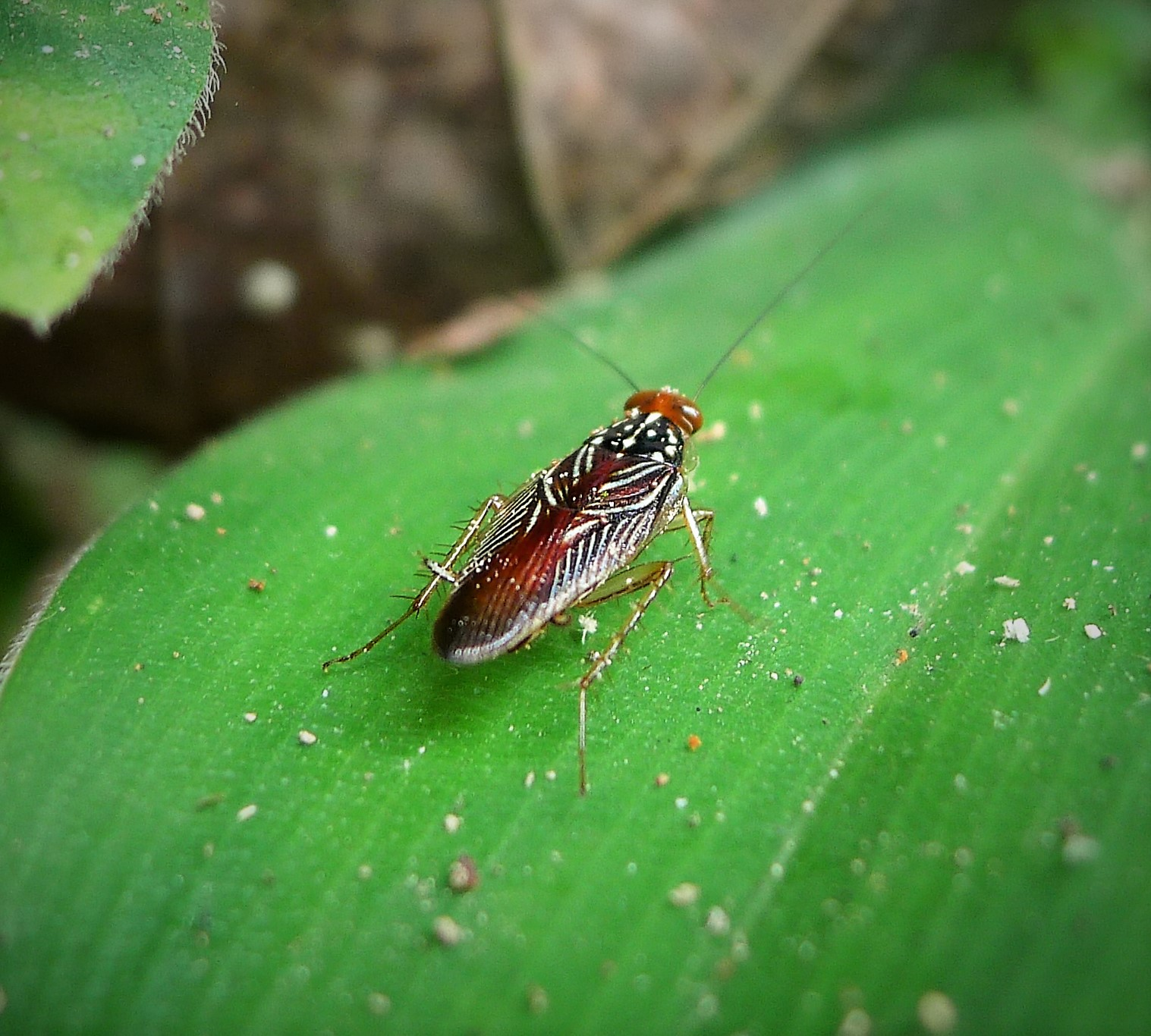
- Pseudophyllodromia sp.

Scientific classification
- Kingdom: Animalia
- Phylum: Arthropoda
- Clade: Pancrustacea
- Class: Insecta
- Order: Blattodea
- Family: Ectobiidae
- Subfamily: Pseudophyllodromiinae; Hebard, 1929

= Pseudophyllodromiinae =

Subfamily of cockroaches

The Pseudophyllodromiinae are a subfamily of cockroaches, in the family Ectobiidae, with a world-wide distribution.

Well known species include:

- Small yellow cockroach Cariblatta lutea
- Brown-banded cockroach Supella longipalpa
- Eastern ellipsidion Ellipsidion australe

== Genera ==
The Cockroach Species File includes 5 tribes:

=== Baltini Rehn, 1951 ===
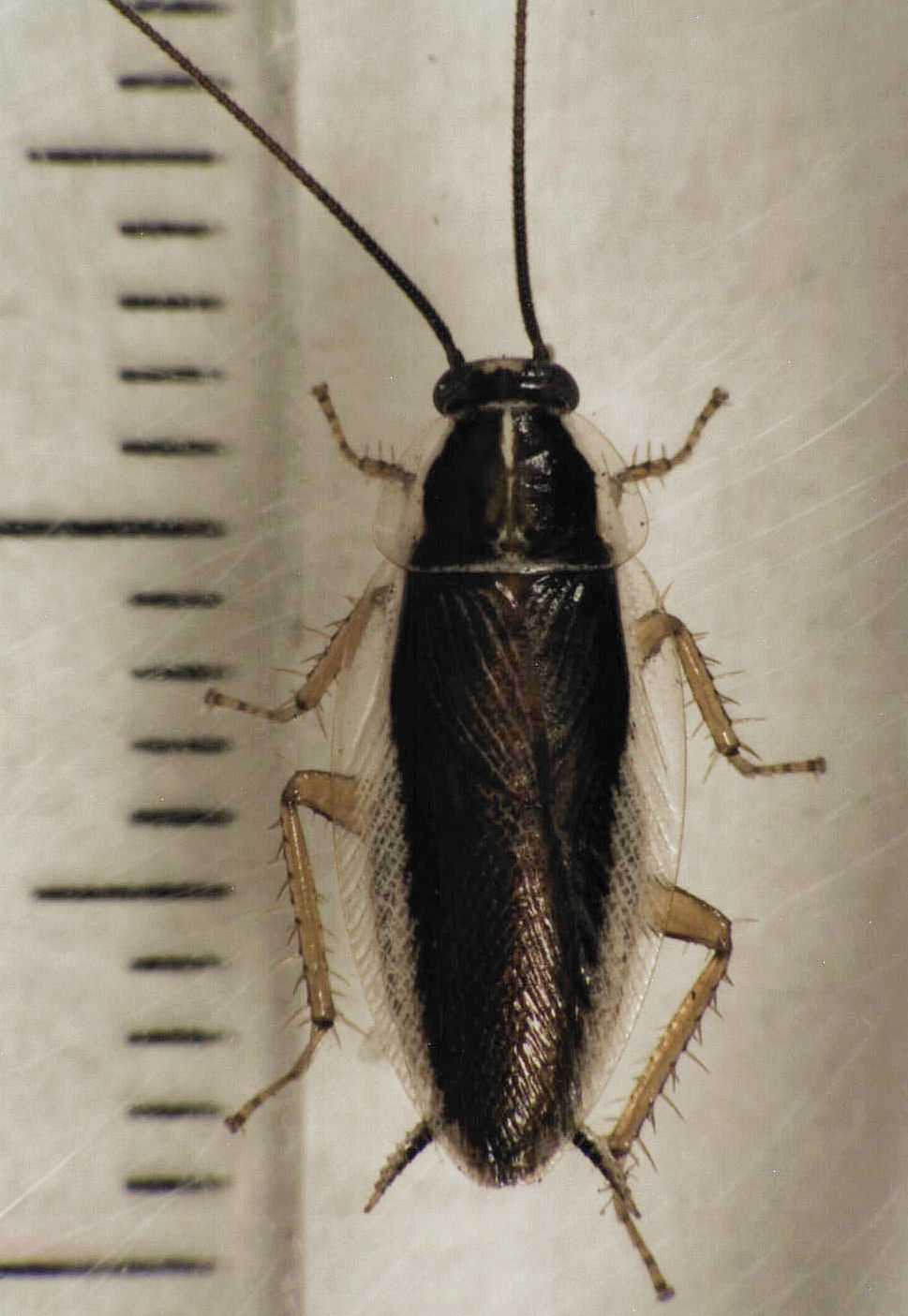
Balta spuria male

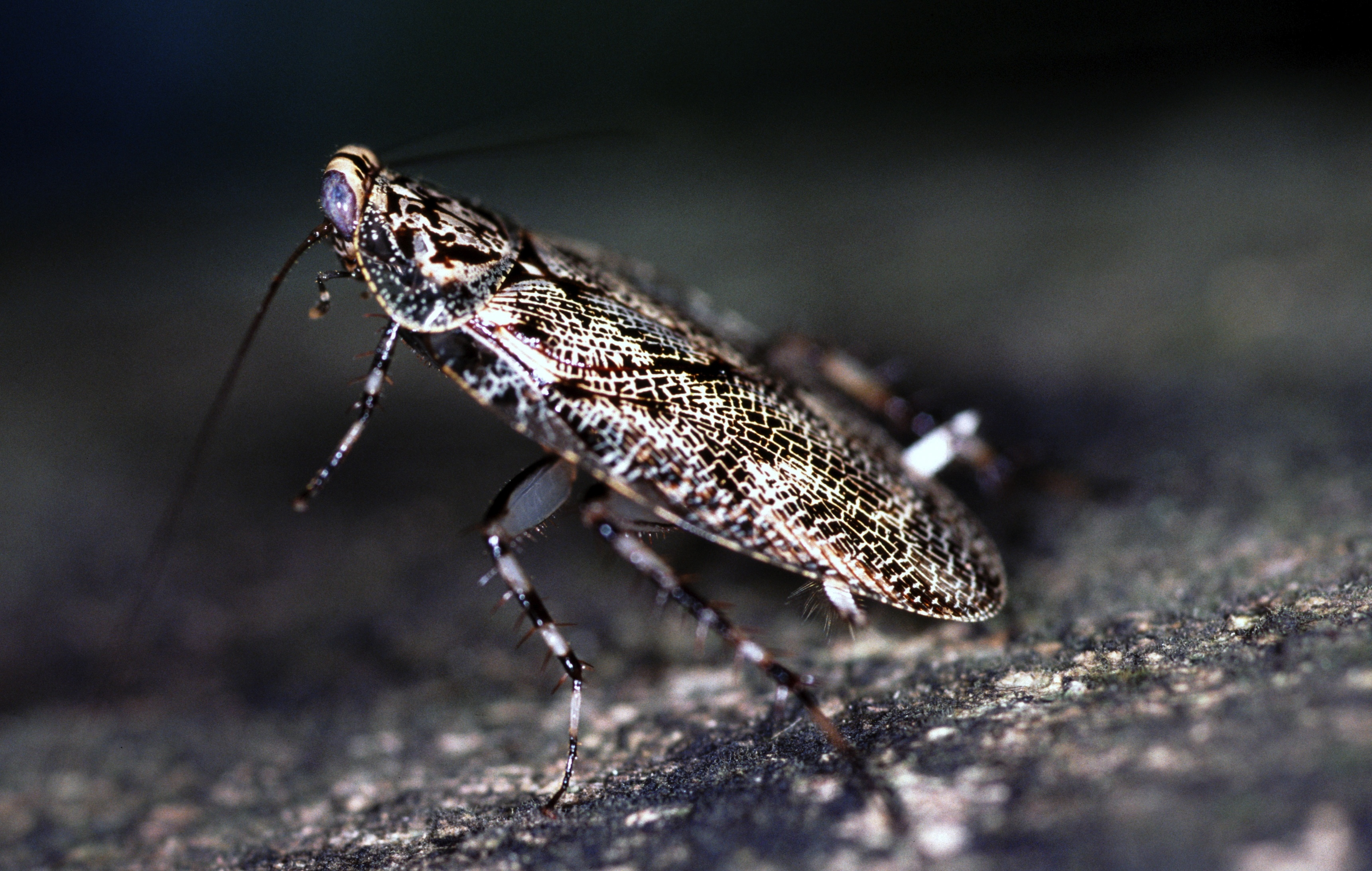
Lupparia sp.

- Afrobalta Princis, 1969
- Balta Tepper 1893
- Ellipsidion Saussure, 1863
- Epibalta Princis, 1974
- Lupparia Walker, 1868
- Matabelina Princis, 1955
- Megamareta Hebard, 1943
- Pachnepteryx Brunner von Wattenwyl, 1865
- Pseudobalta Roth, 1997
- Saltoblattella Bohn, Picker, Klass & Colville, 2010
- Sliferia Roth, 1989
- Supellina Chopard, 1921

=== Neoblattellini Rehn, 1951 ===
- Amazonina Hebard, 1929
- Arawakina Hebard, 1926
- Cariblatta Hebard, 1916
- Cariblattoides Rehn & Hebard, 1927
- Helgaia Rocha e Silva & Gurney, 1963
- Imblattella Bruijning, 1959
- Incoblatta Princis, 1948
- Lophoblatta Hebard, 1929
- Margattea Shelford, 1911
- Nahublattella Bruijning, 1959
- Neoblattella Shelford, 1911
- Trioblattella Bruijning, 1959

=== Plectopterini Rehn, 1951 ===
Distribution: Africa, Americas

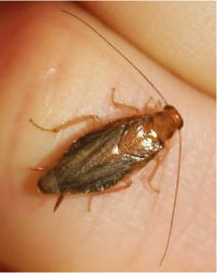
Chorisoneura texensis female

- Anisopygia Saussure, 1893
- Calhypnorna Saussure & Zehntner, 1893
- Chorisoneura Brunner von Wattenwyl, 1865
- Dendroblatta Rehn, 1916
- Euthlastoblatta Hebard, 1917
- Macrophyllodromia Saussure & Zehntner, 1893
- Paranocticola Bonfils, 1977
- Plectoptera Saussure, 1864
- Riatia Walker, 1868

=== Pseudophyllodromiini Hebard, 1929 ===
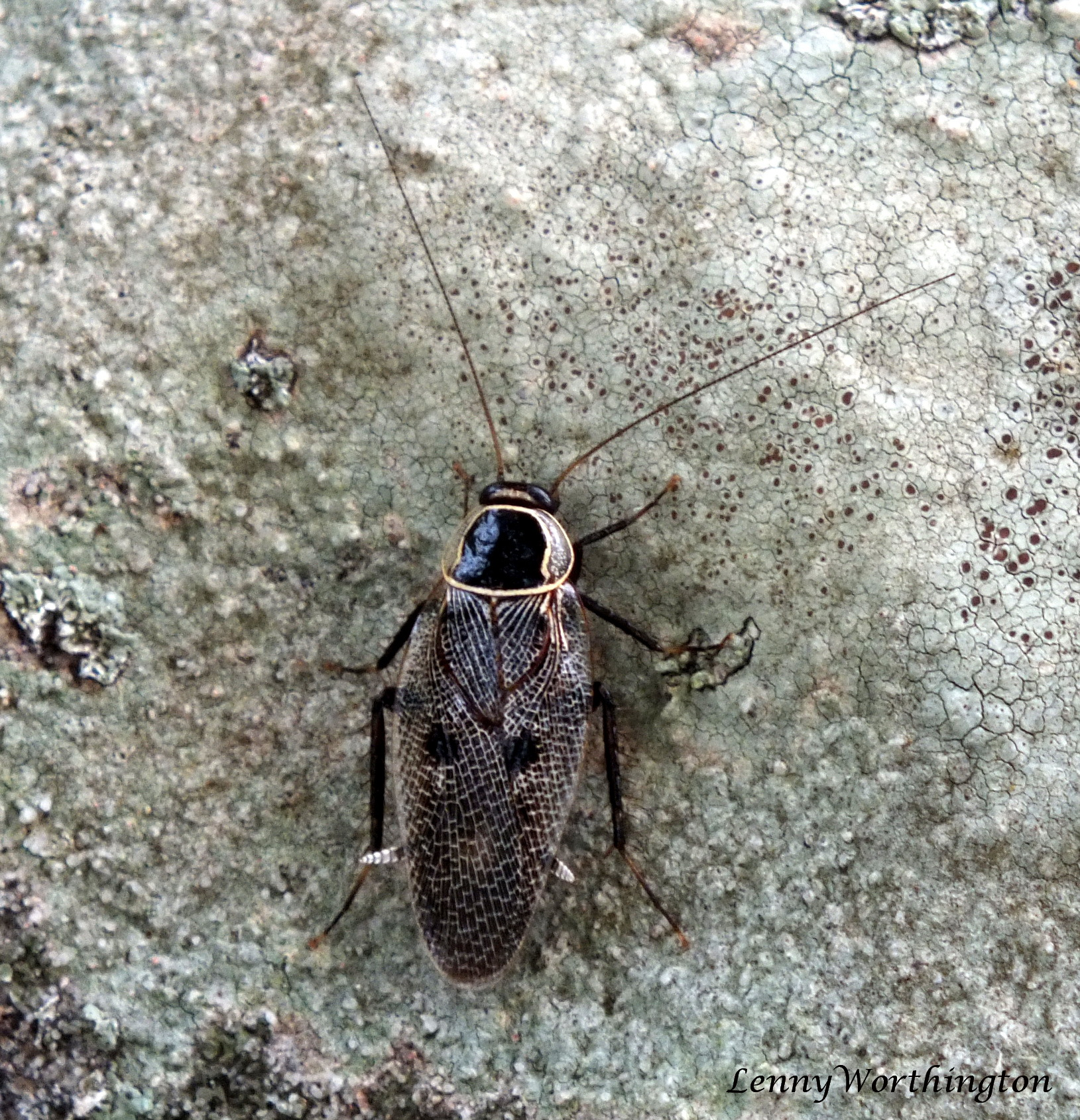
Allacta bimaculata

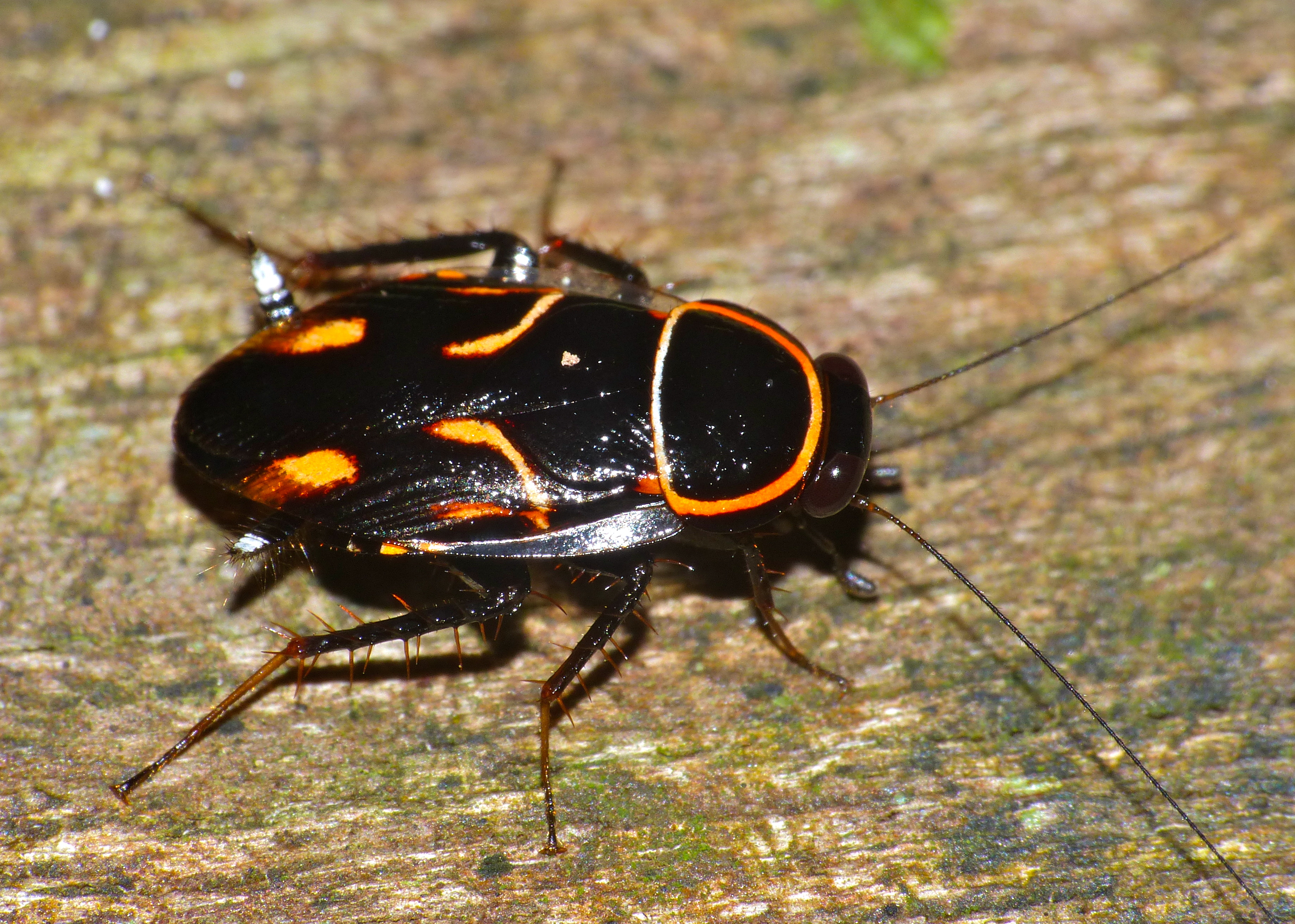
Sundablatta sexpunctata

Distribution: SE Asia to Australia

- Allacta Saussure & Zehntner, 1895
- Pseudophyllodromia Brunner von Wattenwyl, 1865
- Sundablatta Hebard, 1929

=== Supellini Rehn, 1951 ===
Distribution: Africa, Americas

- Ceratinoptera Brunner von Wattenwyl, 1865
- Namablatta Rehn, 1937
- Onycholobus Hanitsch, 1938
- Supella Shelford, 1911

=== Incertae sedis ===
- Afroneura Princis, 1963
- Aglaopteryx Hebard, 1917
- Agmoblatta Gurney & Roth, 1966
- Apteroblatta Shelford, 1910
- Asemoblattana Strand, 1929
- Cariblattella Lopes & Oliveira, 2007
- Chorisoblatta Shelford, 1911
- Chorisomaculata Lopes & Oliveira, 2010
- Chorisoneurodes Princis, 1962
- Chorisoserrata Roth, 1998
- Delosia Bolívar, 1924
- Desmosia Bolívar, 1895
- Doradoblatta Bruijning, 1959
- Episorineuchora Wang & Wang, 2023
- Euphyllodromia Shelford, 1908
- Hypnornoides Rehn, 1917
- Isoldaia Gurney & Roth, 1966
- Latiblattella Hebard, 1917
- Leuropeltis Hebard, 1921
- Margatteoidea Princis, 1959
- Mediastinia Hebard, 1943
- Phidon Rehn, 1933
- Prosoplecta Saussure, 1864
- Pseudectobia Saussure, 1869
- Pseudosymploce Rehn & Hebard, 1927
- Rhytidometopum Hebard, 1920
- Shelfordina Hebard, 1929
- Sorineuchora Caudell, 1927
- Squamoptera Bruijning, 1948
- Tagaloblatta Lucañas, 2016
- Tomeisneria Roth, 1994
