= Abrodiaeta =

Abrodiaeta may refer to:

- Abrodiaeta (katydid), a genus of katydids in the family Tettigoniidae
- Abrodiaeta, a genus of insects in the family Ectobiidae, synonym of Allacta
- Abrodiaeta, a genus of beetles in the family Carabidae, synonym of Abrodiella
