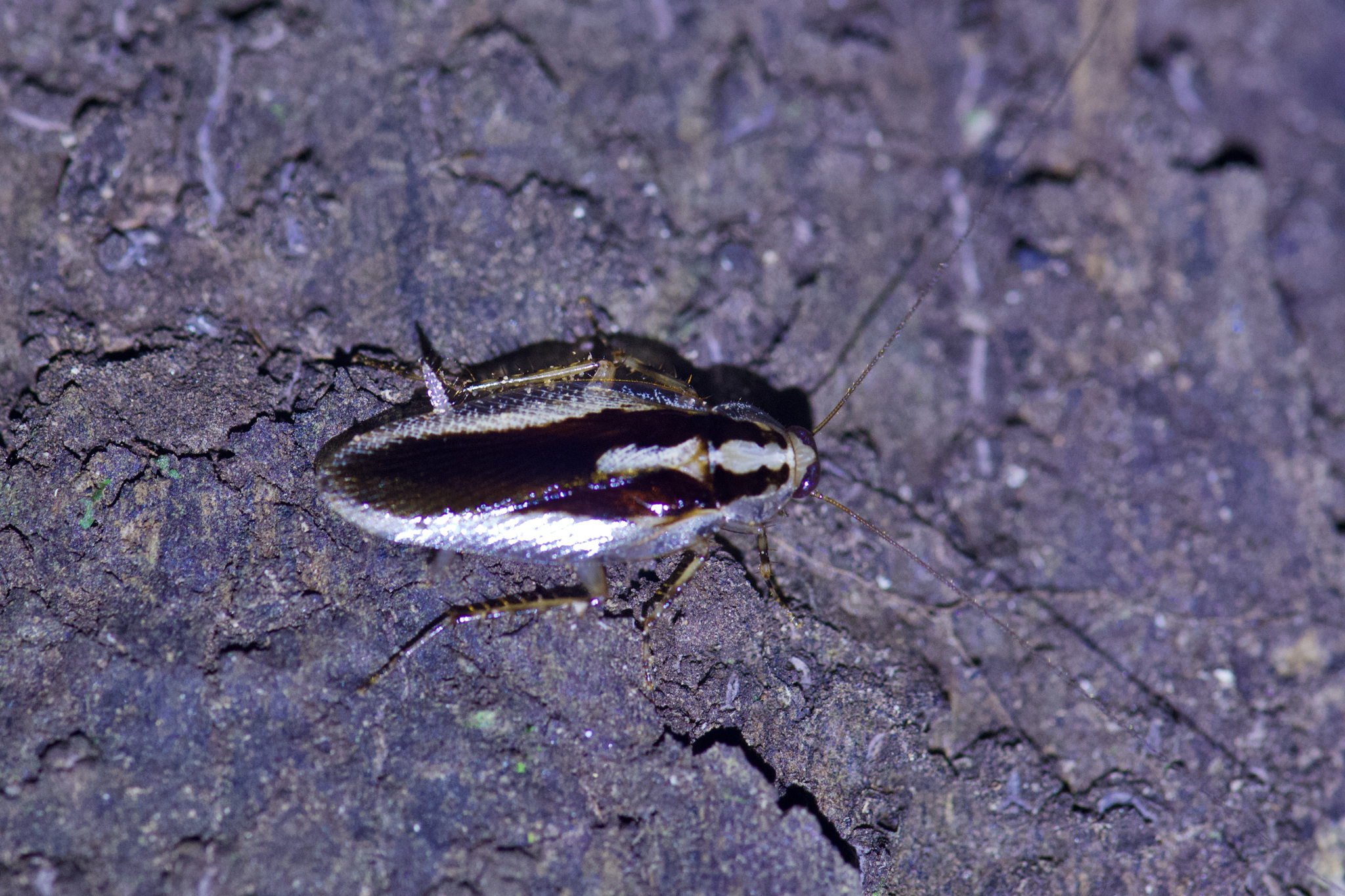

Scientific classification
- Domain: Eukaryota
- Kingdom: Animalia
- Phylum: Arthropoda
- Class: Insecta
- Order: Blattodea
- Family: Ectobiidae
- Genus: Dendroblatta
- Species: D. sobrina

Binomial name
- Dendroblatta sobrina Rehn, 1916

= Dendroblatta sobrina =

Species of cockroaches

Dendroblatta sobrina is a species of cockroaches in the family Ectobiidae. It was first described by James A. G. Rehn in 1916. It is found in Central America and South America.
