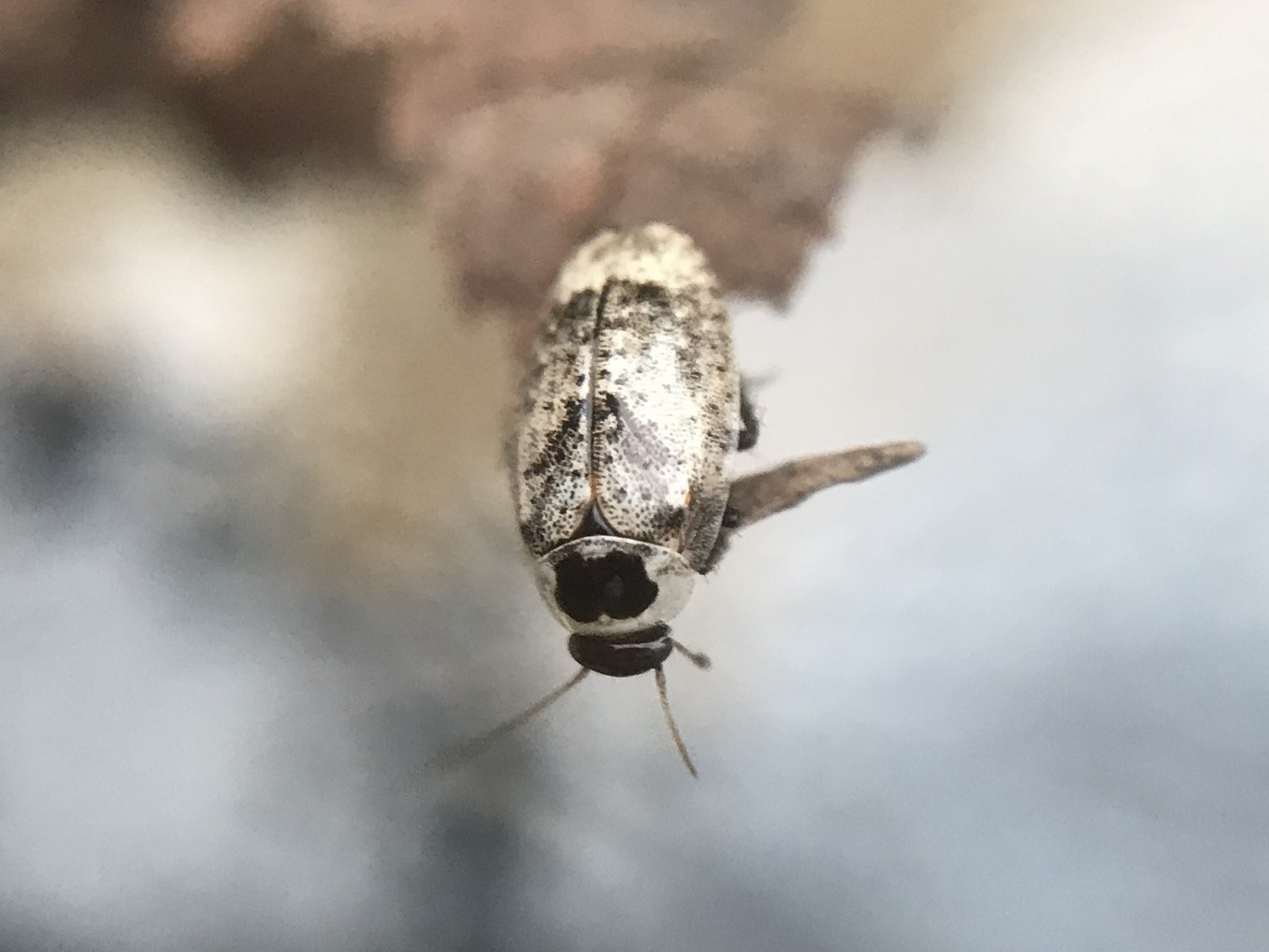

Scientific classification
- Kingdom: Animalia
- Phylum: Arthropoda
- Clade: Pancrustacea
- Class: Insecta
- Order: Blattodea
- Family: Ectobiidae
- Genus: Plectoptera
- Species: P. picta

Binomial name
- Plectoptera picta Saussure & Zehntner, 1893

= Plectoptera picta =

Species of cockroach

Plectoptera picta, the painted beetle cockroach, is a species of cockroach in the family Ectobiidae. It is found in Central America and North America.
