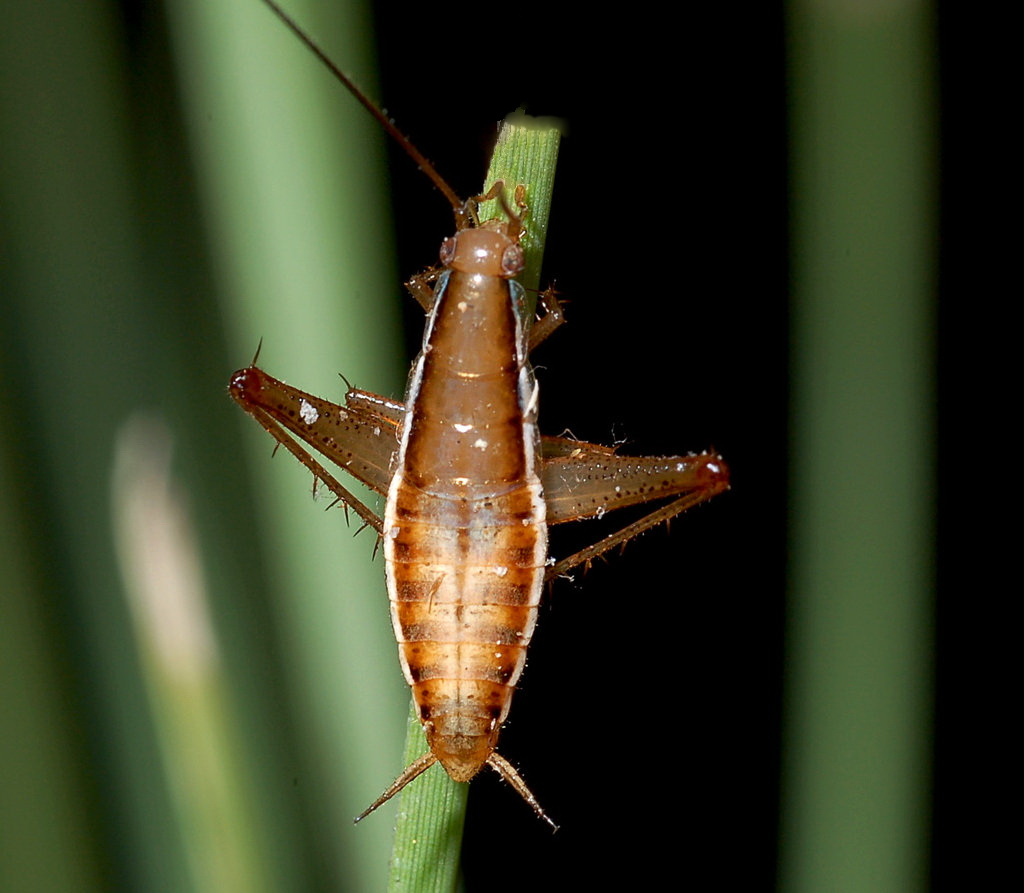

Scientific classification
- Kingdom: Animalia
- Phylum: Arthropoda
- Clade: Pancrustacea
- Class: Insecta
- Order: Blattodea
- Family: Ectobiidae
- Subfamily: Pseudophyllodromiinae
- Genus: Saltoblattella; Bohn, Picker, Klass & Colville, 2009
- Species: S. montistabularis

Binomial name
- Saltoblattella montistabularis Bohn, Picker, Klass & Colville, 2009

= Saltoblattella montistabularis =

Species of cockroach

Saltoblattella montistabularis is a species of jumping cockroach, in the tribe Baltini known only from Table Mountain near Cape Town, South Africa. Both the species and genus were newly described in 2009. Researchers nicknamed the species leaproach. Its jumping mechanism is similar in anatomical features and in performance to grasshoppers with which it shares its habitat. Like grasshoppers, it is able to jump between grass and sedge stems. Its ability to jump is unique among the approximately 4,000 known species of cockroaches. There appear to be many other undescribed species, distributed across the fynbos belt, such as one with a darker body, broader lateral white bands and transverse blue stripes, and another with a black body (except the light brown occipital region of the head), and white borders on the posterior margins of the abdomen, and on the posterior and lateral margins of the thorax, although records with coloration very similar to S. montistabularis can be found outside the Table Mountain area, so these may simply represent different color morphs or forms, especially considering the records of individuals with coloration intermediate between different types.

== Etymology ==
The generic name, Saltoblattella is a compound Latin word that translates as "jumping small cockroach."

== Morphology ==
The new species is characterized by a series of features unique among extant cockroaches. Many of the specializations are apparently jumping adaptations, reflected in unusual morphology of eyes, antennae, legs and tergite glands. Its hind legs are significantly enlarged, unlike typical cockroaches which have legs of similar size and structure.

The male body length is 8–10 mm (0.31–0.39 in), the male pronotum (head shield) is 1.4–1.6 mm (0.055–0.063 in), the female body length is 6.3–7.7 mm (0.25–0.30 in), and the female pronotum is 1.5–1.7 mm (0.059–0.067 in).
