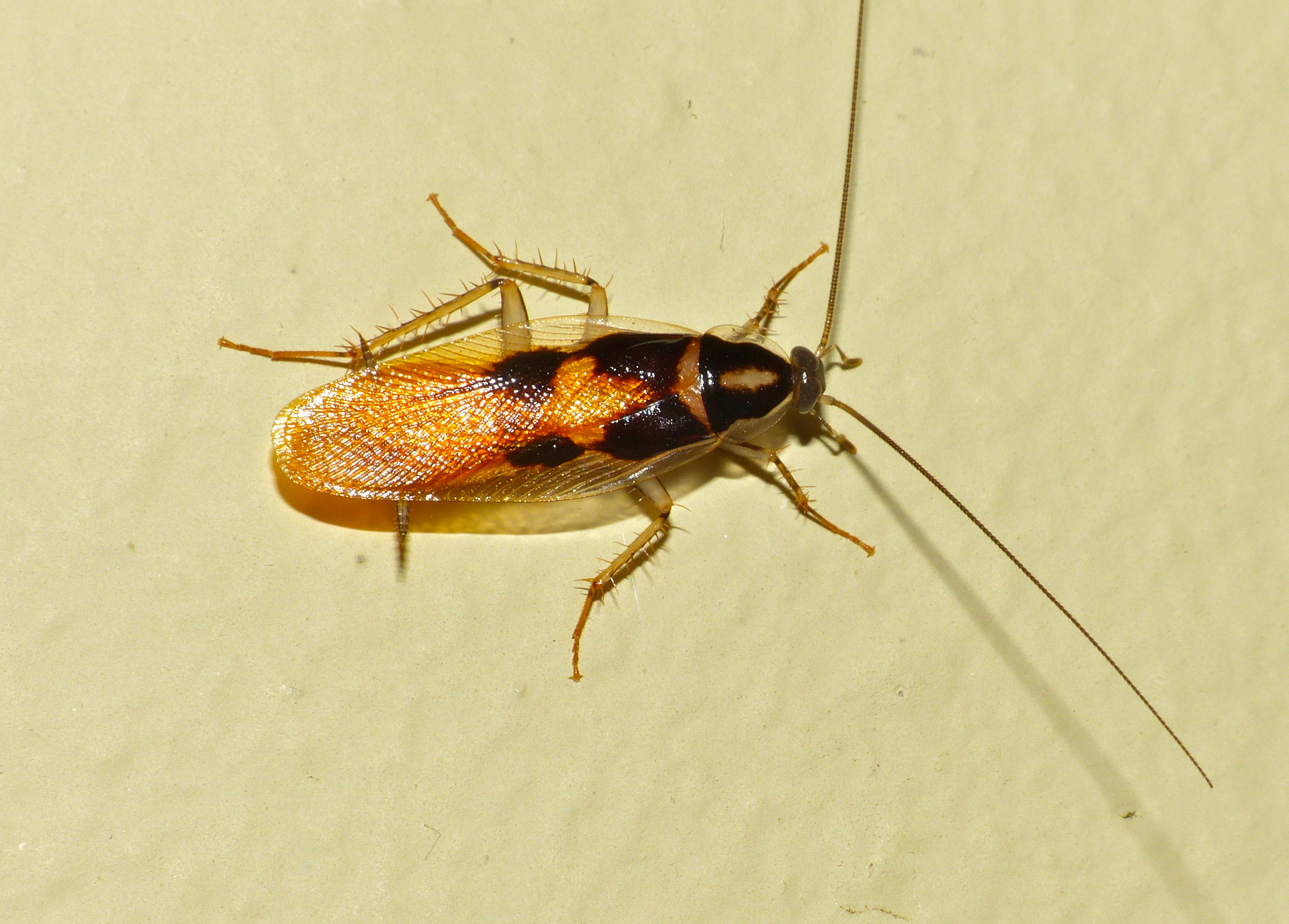
- Supella dimidiata

Scientific classification
- Kingdom: Animalia
- Phylum: Arthropoda
- Clade: Pancrustacea
- Class: Insecta
- Order: Blattodea
- Family: Ectobiidae
- Subfamily: Pseudophyllodromiinae
- Genus: Supella; Shelford, 1911

= Supella =

Genus of cockroaches

Supella is a genus of cosmopolitan and wild cockroaches, in the family Ectobiidae: originating from Africa and the Arabian Peninsula.

== Species ==
The Cockroach Species File lists:

- sub-genus Supella (Mombuttia) Rehn, 1947
  - Supella (Mombuttia) chapini Rehn, 1947
- sub-genus Supella (Nemosupella) Rehn, 1947
  - Supella (Nemosupella) gemma Rehn, 1947
  - Supella (Nemosupella) mirabilis (Shelford, 1908)
  - Supella (Nemosupella) occidentalis Princis, 1963
  - Supella (Nemosupella) tchadiana (Roth, 1987)
- sub-genus Supella (Supella) Shelford, 1911
  - Supella (Supella) abbotti Rehn, 1947
  - Supella (Supella) dimidiata (Gerstaecker, 1869)
  - Supella (Supella) longipalpa (Fabricius, 1798)
    - type species (as Blatta supellectilium Serville; another synonym is S. supellectilium)
  - Supella (Supella) orientalis Grandcolas, 1994
  - Supella (Supella) vicina Chopard, 1958
