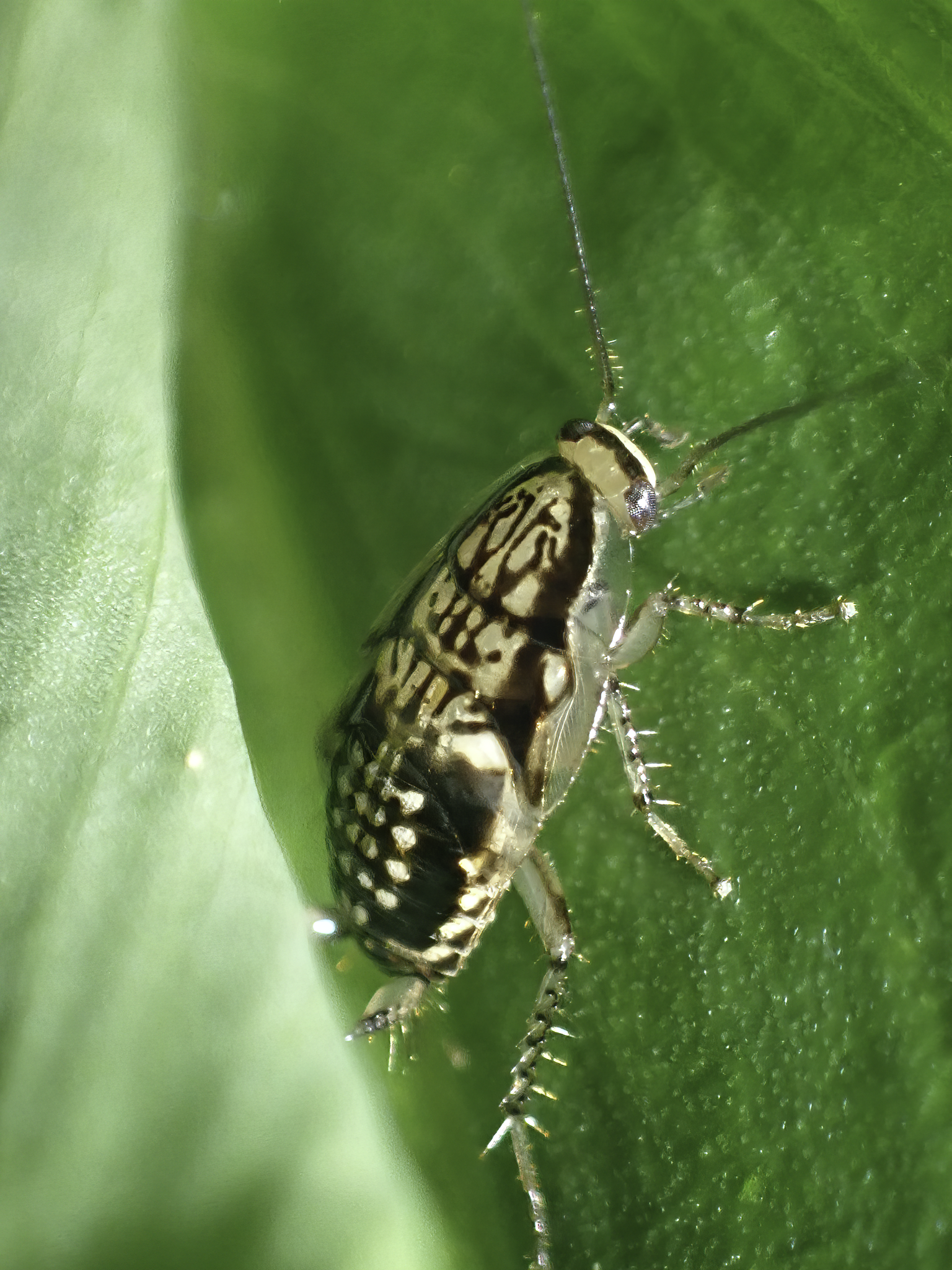
- Neoblattella detersa

Scientific classification
- Kingdom: Animalia
- Phylum: Arthropoda
- Clade: Pancrustacea
- Class: Insecta
- Order: Blattodea
- Family: Ectobiidae
- Subfamily: Pseudophyllodromiinae
- Genus: Neoblattella; Shelford, 1911

= Neoblattella =

Genus of cockroaches

Neoblattella is a genus of cockroach in the family Ectobiidae.

== Species ==
These 39 species belong to the genus Neoblattella:

- Neoblattella adspersicollis (Stål, 1860)
- Neoblattella adusta (Caudell, 1905)
- Neoblattella amazonensis Lopes & Khouri, 2009
- Neoblattella binodosa Hebard, 1926
- Neoblattella borinquenensis Rehn & Hebard, 1927
- Neoblattella carcinus Rehn & Hebard, 1927
- Neoblattella carrikeri Hebard, 1919
- Neoblattella carvalhoi Rocha e Silva & Lopes, 1976
- Neoblattella celeripes Rehn & Hebard, 1927
- †Neoblattella cookrock Vršanský et al., 2025
- Neoblattella detersa (Walker, 1868)
- Neoblattella dryas Rehn & Hebard, 1927
- Neoblattella elegantula Rocha e Silva, 1964
- Neoblattella eurydice Rehn & Hebard, 1927
- Neoblattella festae (Giglio-Tos, 1898)
- Neoblattella grossbecki Rehn & Hebard, 1927
- Neoblattella guadeloupensis Bonfils, 1969
- Neoblattella guanayara Gurney, 1942
- Neoblattella guianae Hebard, 1929
- Neoblattella infausta Rehn & Hebard, 1927
- Neoblattella longior Hebard, 1926
- Neoblattella lucubrans Rehn & Hebard, 1927
- Neoblattella maculiventris (Shelford, 1909)
- Neoblattella mista Lopes & Khouri, 2011
- Neoblattella nodipennis Hebard, 1926
- Neoblattella paulista Rocha e Silva & Gurney, 1963
- Neoblattella perdentata Bonfils, 1969
- Neoblattella picta Rocha e Silva & Gurney, 1962
- Neoblattella poecilopensis Lopes & Khouri, 2009
- Neoblattella poecilops Hebard, 1926
- Neoblattella proserpina Rehn & Hebard, 1927
- Neoblattella puerilis (Rehn, 1915)
- Neoblattella semota Rehn & Hebard, 1927
- Neoblattella sucina Rehn, 1932
- Neoblattella tapenagae Hebard, 1921
- Neoblattella titania (Rehn, 1903)
- Neoblattella tridens Rehn & Hebard, 1927
- Neoblattella unifascia Hebard, 1926
- Neoblattella vatia Rehn & Hebard, 1927
- Neoblattella vomer Rehn & Hebard, 1927
