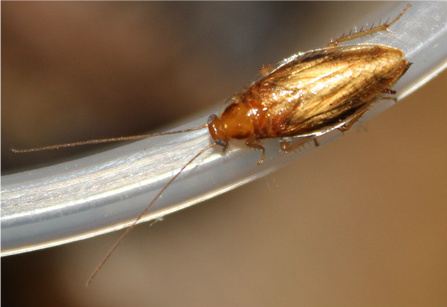
- Chorisoneura texensis adult female Wake Forest NC

Scientific classification
- Kingdom: Animalia
- Phylum: Arthropoda
- Clade: Pancrustacea
- Class: Insecta
- Order: Blattodea
- Family: Ectobiidae
- Subfamily: Pseudophyllodromiinae
- Genus: Chorisoneura; Brunner, 1865

= Chorisoneura =

Genus of cockroaches

Chorisoneura is a genus of cockroach in the family Ectobiidae. There are at least 90 described species in Chorisoneura.

== Species ==
These 90 species belong to the genus Chorisoneura:

- Chorisoneura africana Borg, 1902
- Chorisoneura albifrons Princis, 1951
- Chorisoneura albonervosa Rehn, 1916
- Chorisoneura amazona Rehn, 1932
- Chorisoneura anisoura Hebard, 1922
- Chorisoneura annulicornis Princis, 1951
- Chorisoneura anomala Saussure & Zehntner, 1893
- Chorisoneura apolinari Hebard, 1933
- Chorisoneura argentina Brancsik, 1898
- Chorisoneura barbadensis Rehn & Hebard, 1927
- Chorisoneura barticae Hebard, 1921
- Chorisoneura bella Rocha e Silva & Aguiar, 1977
- Chorisoneura bilineata Princis, 1955
- Chorisoneura bisignata Rehn, 1917
- Chorisoneura bradleyi Hebard, 1933
- Chorisoneura brunneri Shelford, 1907
- Chorisoneura cabimae Hebard, 1920
- Chorisoneura calogramma (Walker, 1868)
- Chorisoneura carpenteri Roth, 1992
- Chorisoneura cassiphila (Rochebrune, 1883)
- Chorisoneura castanea Rocha e Silva, 1971
- Chorisoneura castaneolineata Rocha e Silva & Aguiar, 1977
- Chorisoneura catuabana Lopes & Oliveira, 2004
- Chorisoneura centralis Rocha e Silva & Aguiar, 1977
- Chorisoneura cistelina (Walker, 1868)
- Chorisoneura colorata Hebard, 1929
- Chorisoneura cristobalensis Roth, 1992
- Chorisoneura diaphana Princis, 1965
- Chorisoneura dimidiaticornis Saussure & Zehntner, 1893
- Chorisoneura discoidalis (Burmeister, 1838)
- Chorisoneura elegantula Hebard, 1926
- Chorisoneura excelsa Rocha e Silva & Lopes, 1977
- Chorisoneura exquisita Rehn, 1932
- Chorisoneura flavipennis Saussure & Zehntner, 1893
- Chorisoneura formosella Rehn & Hebard, 1927
- Chorisoneura fulgurosa Lopes & Oliveira, 2004
- Chorisoneura fulva Rocha e Silva & Aguiar, 1977
- Chorisoneura fuscipennis Hebard, 1920
- Chorisoneura galibi Hebard, 1926
- Chorisoneura gatunae Hebard, 1921
- Chorisoneura gemmicula Hebard, 1920
- Chorisoneura gracilis (Saussure, 1862)
- Chorisoneura guianae Hebard, 1921
- Chorisoneura heydei Bruijning, 1959
- Chorisoneura inquinata Saussure, 1869
- Chorisoneura inversa Hebard, 1926
- Chorisoneura itatiaiensis Rocha e Silva, 1957
- Chorisoneura janeirensis Princis, 1951
- Chorisoneura lata Rehn, 1916
- Chorisoneura latissima Rocha e Silva & Aguiar, 1977
- Chorisoneura levallonia Rocha e Silva & Lopes, 1977
- Chorisoneura lineatifrons Princis, 1948
- Chorisoneura lopesi Rocha e Silva, 1957
- Chorisoneura meinerti Princis, 1951
- Chorisoneura mimosa Lopes & Oliveira, 2004
- Chorisoneura minuta Saussure, 1869
- Chorisoneura morosa Shelford, 1907
- Chorisoneura multivenosa Saussure, 1869
- Chorisoneura mysteca (Saussure, 1862)
- Chorisoneura nigrifrons (Serville, 1838)
- Chorisoneura nigrostriga Hebard, 1929
- Chorisoneura nobilis Rocha e Silva & Aguiar, 1977
- Chorisoneura panamae Hebard, 1920
- Chorisoneura parishi Rehn, 1918
- Chorisoneura perloides (Walker, 1868)
- Chorisoneura perlucida (Walker, 1868)
- Chorisoneura personata Rehn, 1916
- Chorisoneura peruana Caudell, 1914
- Chorisoneura polita Rehn, 1916
- Chorisoneura poststriga (Walker, 1868)
- Chorisoneura pulcherrima Rehn, 1916
- Chorisoneura roppai Lopes & Oliveira, 2004
- Chorisoneura similis Princis, 1951
- Chorisoneura sinop Rocha e Silva & Aguiar, 1977
- Chorisoneura sordida Brunner von Wattenwyl, 1865
- Chorisoneura specilliger Hebard, 1920
- Chorisoneura splendida Hebard, 1926
- Chorisoneura strigifrons Hebard, 1926
- Chorisoneura stylata Hebard, 1926
- Chorisoneura surinama Saussure, 1868
- Chorisoneura taeniata Saussure & Zehntner, 1893
- Chorisoneura tessellata Rehn, 1916
- Chorisoneura texensis Saussure & Zehntner, 1893 (small yellow Texas cockroach)
- Chorisoneura thalassina Shelford, 1913
- Chorisoneura translucida (Saussure, 1864)
- Chorisoneura viridis Rocha e Silva & Aguiar, 1977
- Chorisoneura vitrifera (Walker, 1868)
- Chorisoneura vitrocincta (Walker, 1868)
- Chorisoneura vivida Rocha e Silva & Gurney, 1962
- Chorisoneura yaguas Rehn, 1932
