= Euthlastoblatta abortiva =

Scientific classification
- Kingdom: Animalia
- Phylum: Arthropoda
- Clade: Pancrustacea
- Class: Insecta
- Order: Blattodea
- Family: Ectobiidae
- Genus: Euthlastoblatta
- Species: E. abortiva

Binomial name
- Euthlastoblatta abortiva (Caudell, 1904)

Species of cockroach

Euthlastoblatta abortiva, the fragile cockroach, is a species of cockroach in the family Ectobiidae. It is found in Central America and North America.
