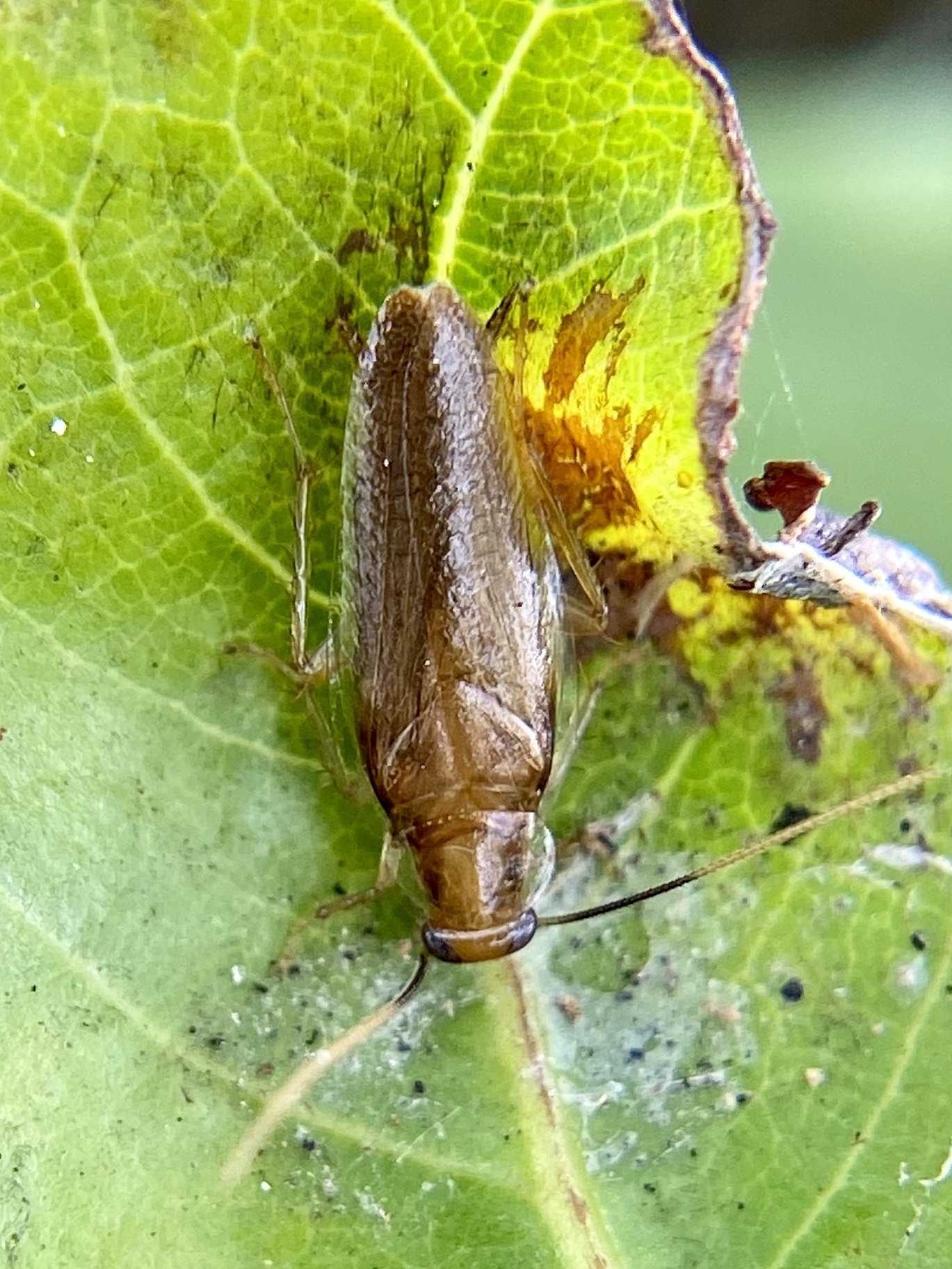

Scientific classification
- Kingdom: Animalia
- Phylum: Arthropoda
- Clade: Pancrustacea
- Class: Insecta
- Order: Blattodea
- Family: Ectobiidae
- Genus: Chorisoneura
- Species: C. parishi

Binomial name
- Chorisoneura parishi Rehn, 1918

= Chorisoneura parishi =

Species of cockroach

Chorisoneura parishi is a species of cockroach in the family Ectobiidae. It is found in Central America, North America, and South America.
