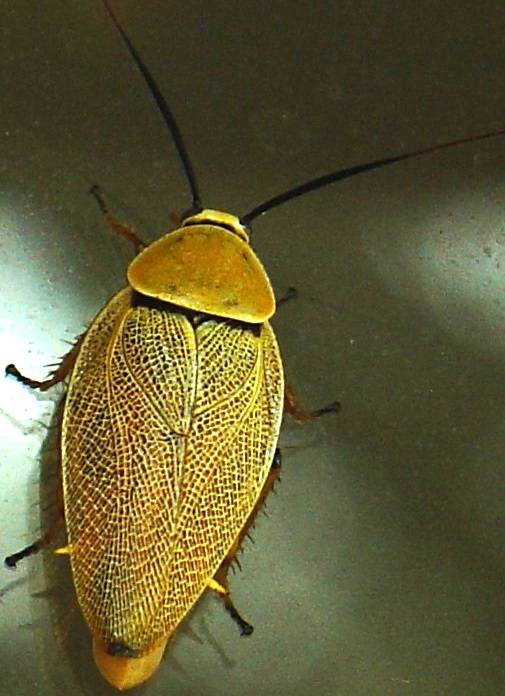
- Ellipsidion humerale

Scientific classification
- Kingdom: Animalia
- Phylum: Arthropoda
- Clade: Pancrustacea
- Class: Insecta
- Order: Blattodea
- Family: Ectobiidae
- Subfamily: Pseudophyllodromiinae
- Genus: Ellipsidion; Saussure, 1863

Species
- See text

Synonyms
- Apolyta Brunner von Wattenwyl, 1865; Ellipsidium Saussure, 1864

= Ellipsidion =

Genus of cockroach

Ellipsidion is a genus of cockroach in the family Ectobiidae. According to the Cockroach Species File, it contains eighteen species:

- Ellipsidion amplum Hebard, 1943
- Ellipsidion australe (Saussure, 1863)
- Ellipsidion bicolor (Tepper, 1895)
- Ellipsidion castaneum (Shelford, 1907)
- Ellipsidion femoratum (Brunner von Wattenwyl, 1865)
- Ellipsidion gemmiculum Hebard, 1943
- Ellipsidion humerale (Tepper, 1893)
- Ellipsidion laetum Hanitsch, 1934
- Ellipsidion magnificum Hebard, 1943
- Ellipsidion marginiferum (Walker, 1868)
- Ellipsidion notabile Hebard, 1943
- Ellipsidion quadripunctatum (Tepper, 1893)
- Ellipsidion ramosum (Walker, 1871)
- Ellipsidion reticulatum Saussure, 1864
- Ellipsidion simulans Hebard, 1943
- Ellipsidion terminale Hanitsch, 1923
- Ellipsidion variegatum (Fabricius, 1775)
- Ellipsidion yapenensis Roth, 1999
