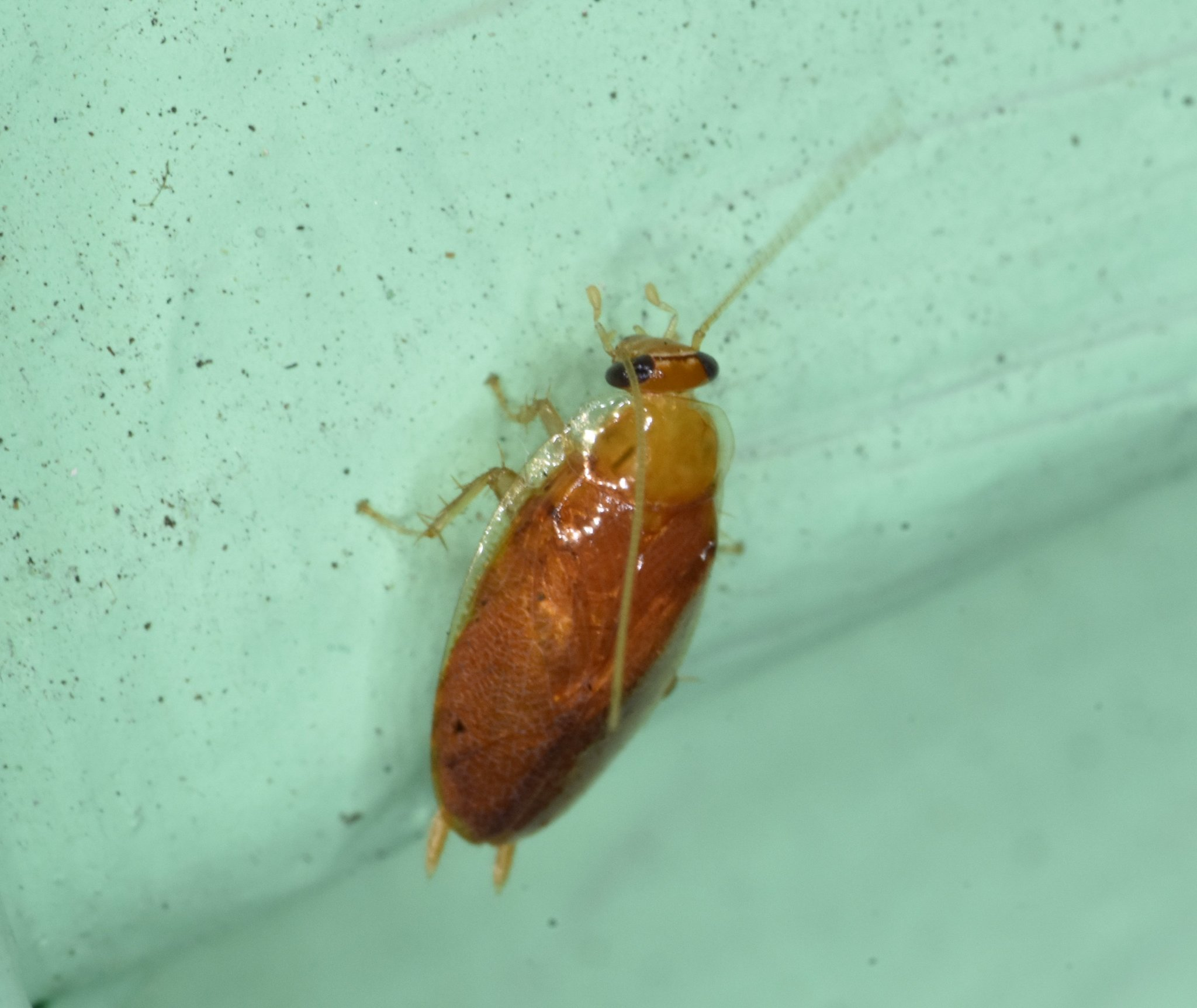

Scientific classification
- Kingdom: Animalia
- Phylum: Arthropoda
- Clade: Pancrustacea
- Class: Insecta
- Order: Blattodea
- Family: Ectobiidae
- Genus: Plectoptera
- Species: P. poeyi

Binomial name
- Plectoptera poeyi (Saussure, 1862)

= Plectoptera poeyi =

Species of cockroach

Plectoptera poeyi, commonly known as the Florida beetle roach or Florida beetle cockroach, is a species of cockroach in the family Ectobiidae. It is found in North America, and the Caribbean.
