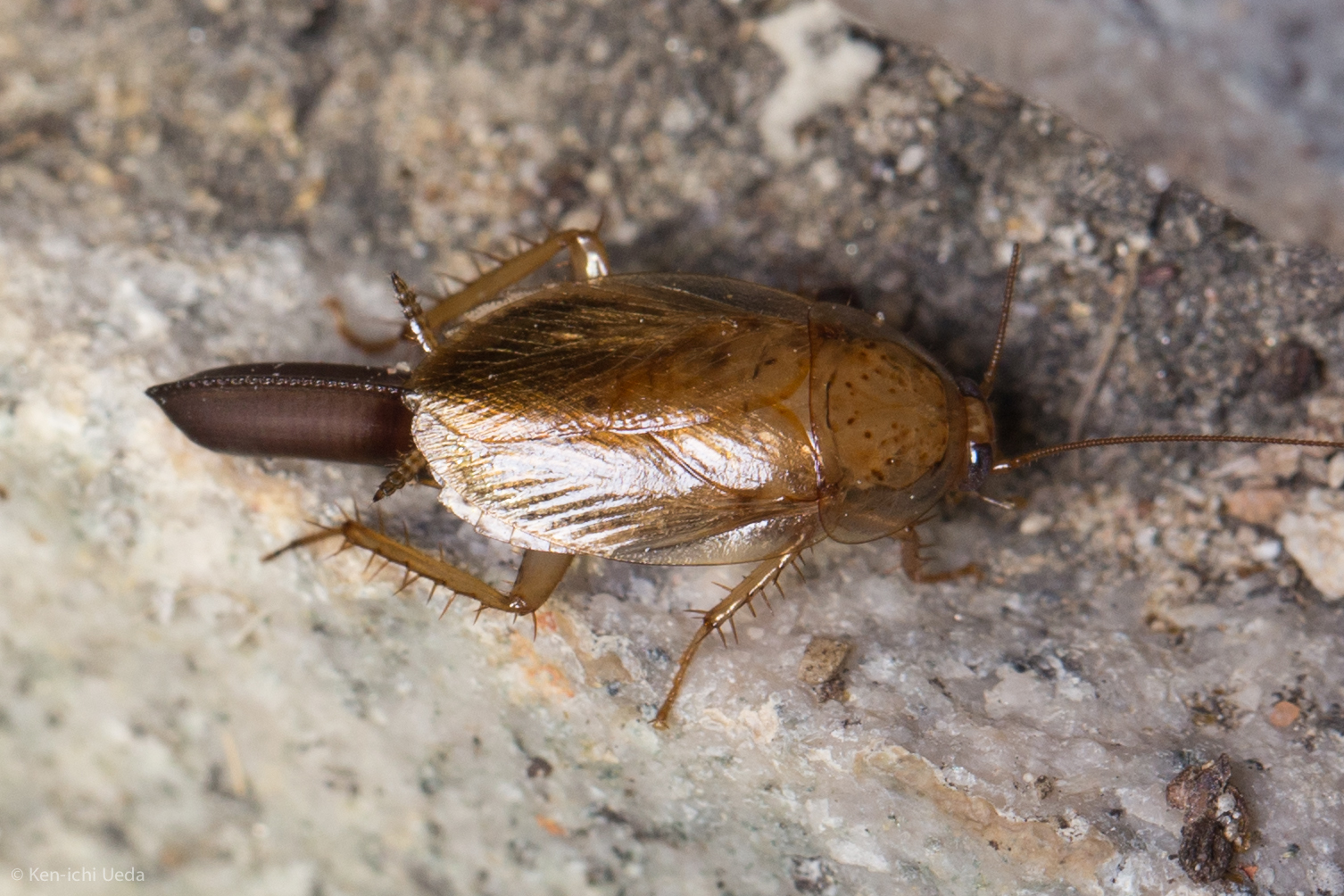

Scientific classification
- Kingdom: Animalia
- Phylum: Arthropoda
- Clade: Pancrustacea
- Class: Insecta
- Order: Blattodea
- Family: Ectobiidae
- Genus: Latiblattella
- Species: L. lucifrons

Binomial name
- Latiblattella lucifrons Hebard, 1917

= Latiblattella lucifrons =

Species of cockroach

Latiblattella lucifrons, the pale headed cockroach, is a species of cockroach in the family Ectobiidae. It is found in Central America and North America.
