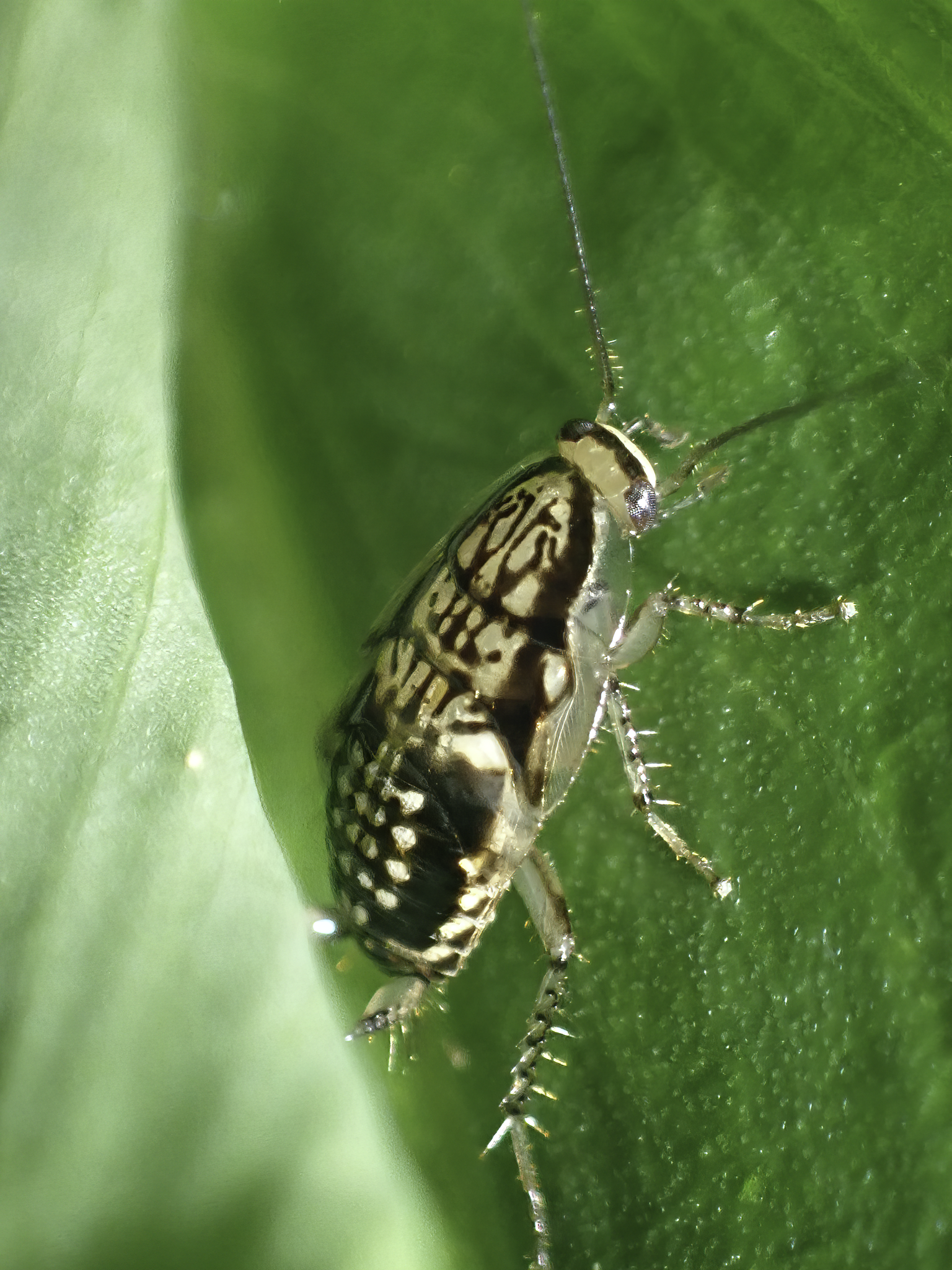

Scientific classification
- Kingdom: Animalia
- Phylum: Arthropoda
- Clade: Pancrustacea
- Class: Insecta
- Order: Blattodea
- Family: Ectobiidae
- Genus: Neoblattella
- Species: N. detersa

Binomial name
- Neoblattella detersa (Walker, 1868)

= Neoblattella detersa =

Species of cockroach

Neoblattella detersa is a species of cockroach in the family Ectobiidae. It is found in North America, and the Caribbean.
