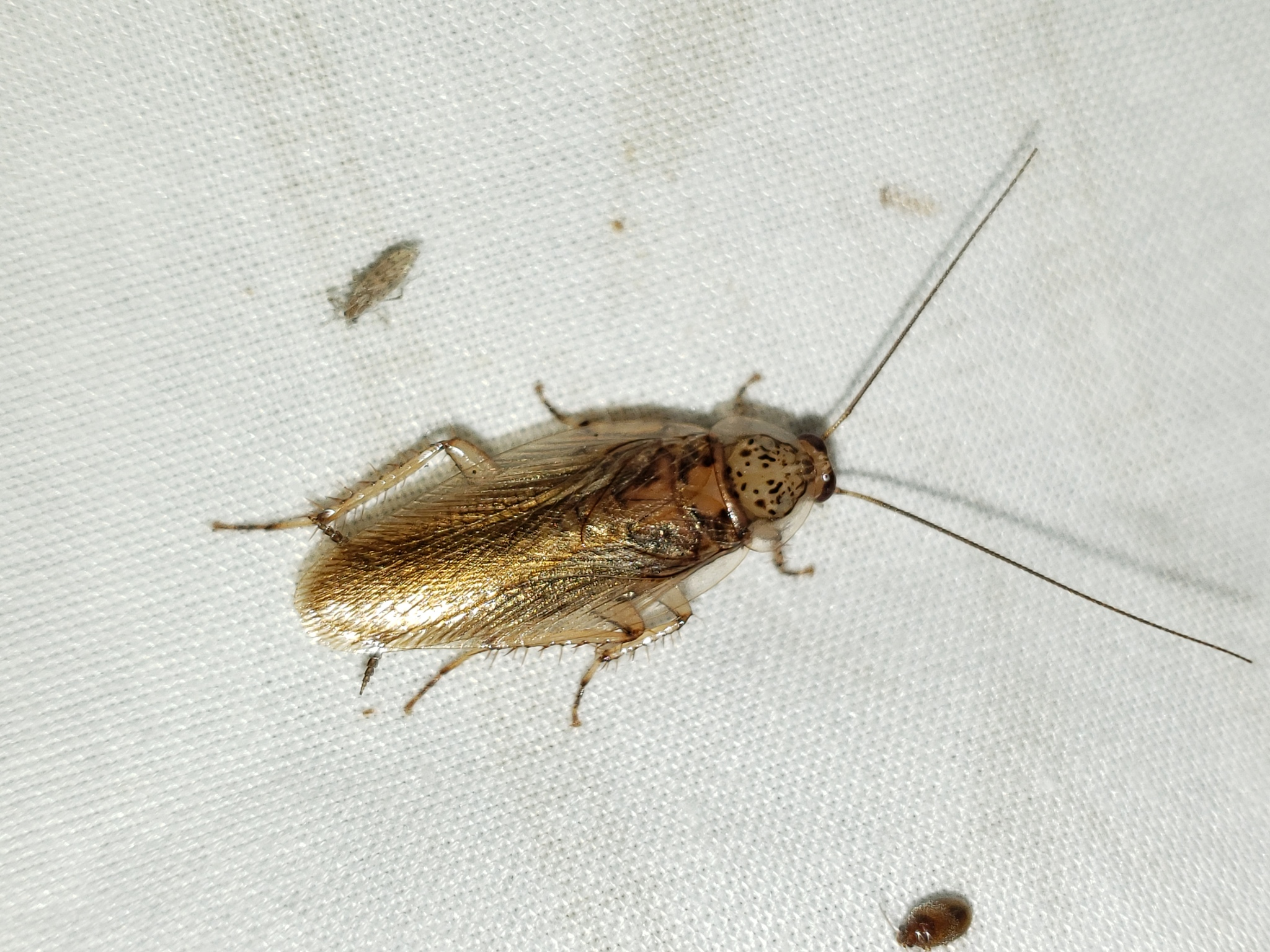

Scientific classification
- Kingdom: Animalia
- Phylum: Arthropoda
- Clade: Pancrustacea
- Class: Insecta
- Order: Blattodea
- Family: Ectobiidae
- Genus: Latiblattella
- Species: L. rehni

Binomial name
- Latiblattella rehni Hebard, 1917

= Latiblattella rehni =

Species of cockroach

Latiblattella rehni, or Rehn's cockroach, is a species of cockroach in the family Ectobiidae. It is found in North America and the Caribbean.
