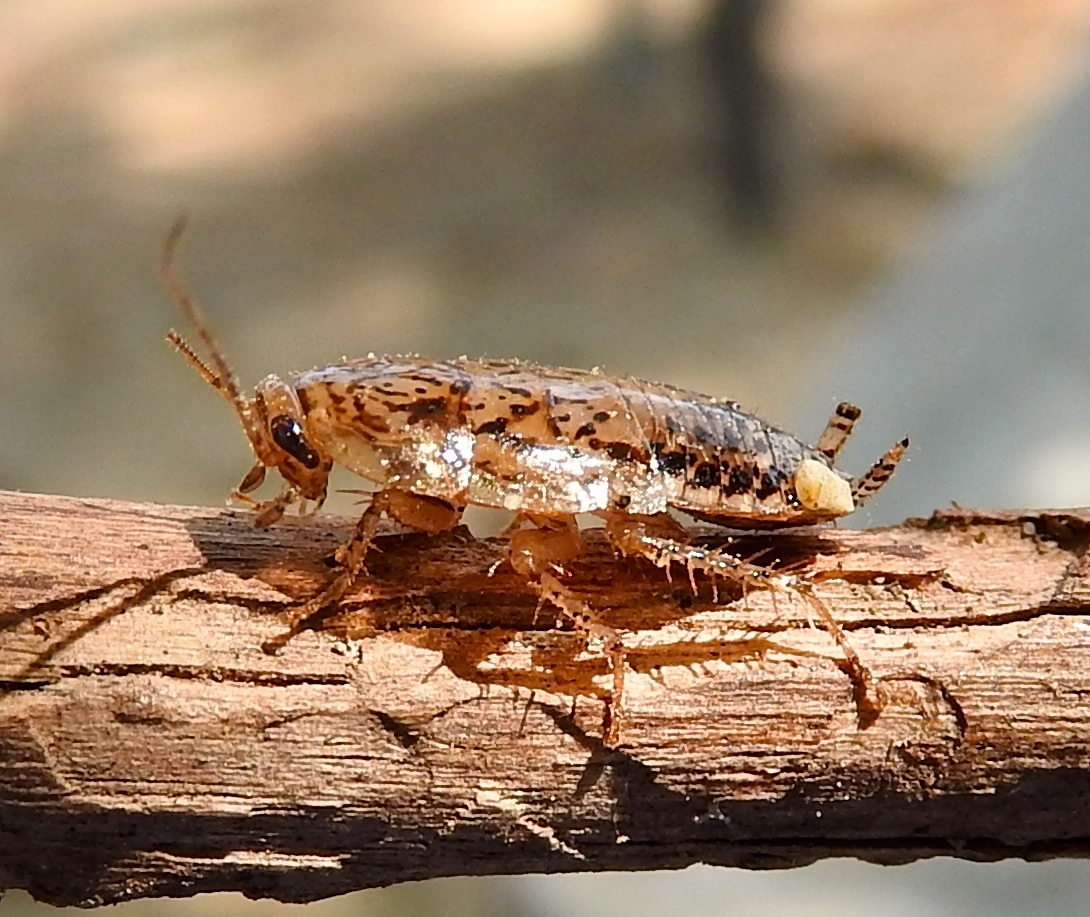

Scientific classification
- Kingdom: Animalia
- Phylum: Arthropoda
- Clade: Pancrustacea
- Class: Insecta
- Order: Blattodea
- Family: Ectobiidae
- Subfamily: Pseudophyllodromiinae
- Genus: Latiblattella; Hebard, 1917

= Latiblattella =

Genus of cockroaches

Latiblattella is a genus of cockroach in the family Ectobiidae.

== Species ==
These 18 species belong to the genus Latiblattella:

- Latiblattella acolhua (Saussure, 1868)
- Latiblattella angustifrons Hebard, 1920
- Latiblattella azteca (Saussure & Zehntner, 1893)
- Latiblattella bradleyi Hebard, 1933
- Latiblattella chichimeca (Saussure & Zehntner, 1893)
- Latiblattella dilatata (Saussure, 1868)
- Latiblattella inornata Hebard, 1920
- Latiblattella kaupiana (Saussure, 1873)
- Latiblattella lucifrons Hebard, 1917 (pale headed cockroach)
- Latiblattella mexicana (Saussure, 1864)
- Latiblattella nitida (Saussure & Zehntner, 1893)
- Latiblattella pavida (Rehn, 1903)
- Latiblattella picturata Hebard, 1921
- Latiblattella rehni Hebard, 1917 (Rehn's cockroach)
- Latiblattella spectativa (Rehn, 1903)
- Latiblattella tarasca (Saussure, 1862)
- Latiblattella vitrea (Brunner von Wattenwyl, 1865)
- Latiblattella zapoteca (Saussure, 1862)
