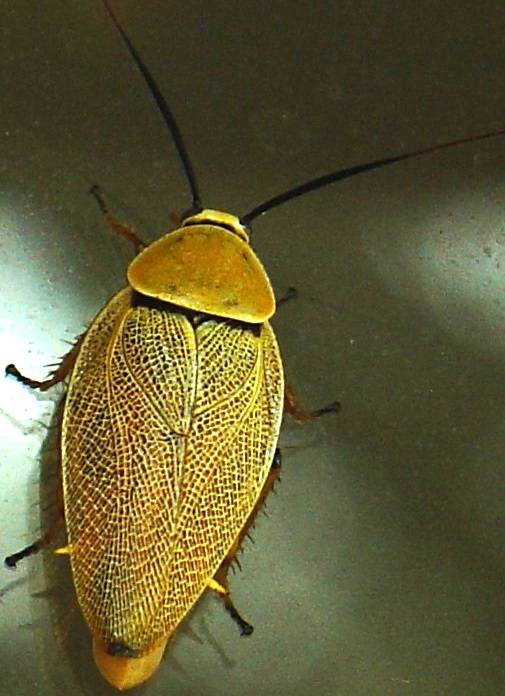

Scientific classification
- Kingdom: Animalia
- Phylum: Arthropoda
- Clade: Pancrustacea
- Class: Insecta
- Order: Blattodea
- Family: Ectobiidae
- Genus: Ellipsidion
- Species: E. humerale

Binomial name
- Ellipsidion humerale (Tepper, 1893)

= Ellipsidion humerale =

Species of cockroach

Ellipsidion humerale, or common ellipsidion or bush cockroach, is a harmless species of cockroach native to northern parts of Australia and also found in the vicinity of Perth, Western Australia and Brisbane, Queensland.
