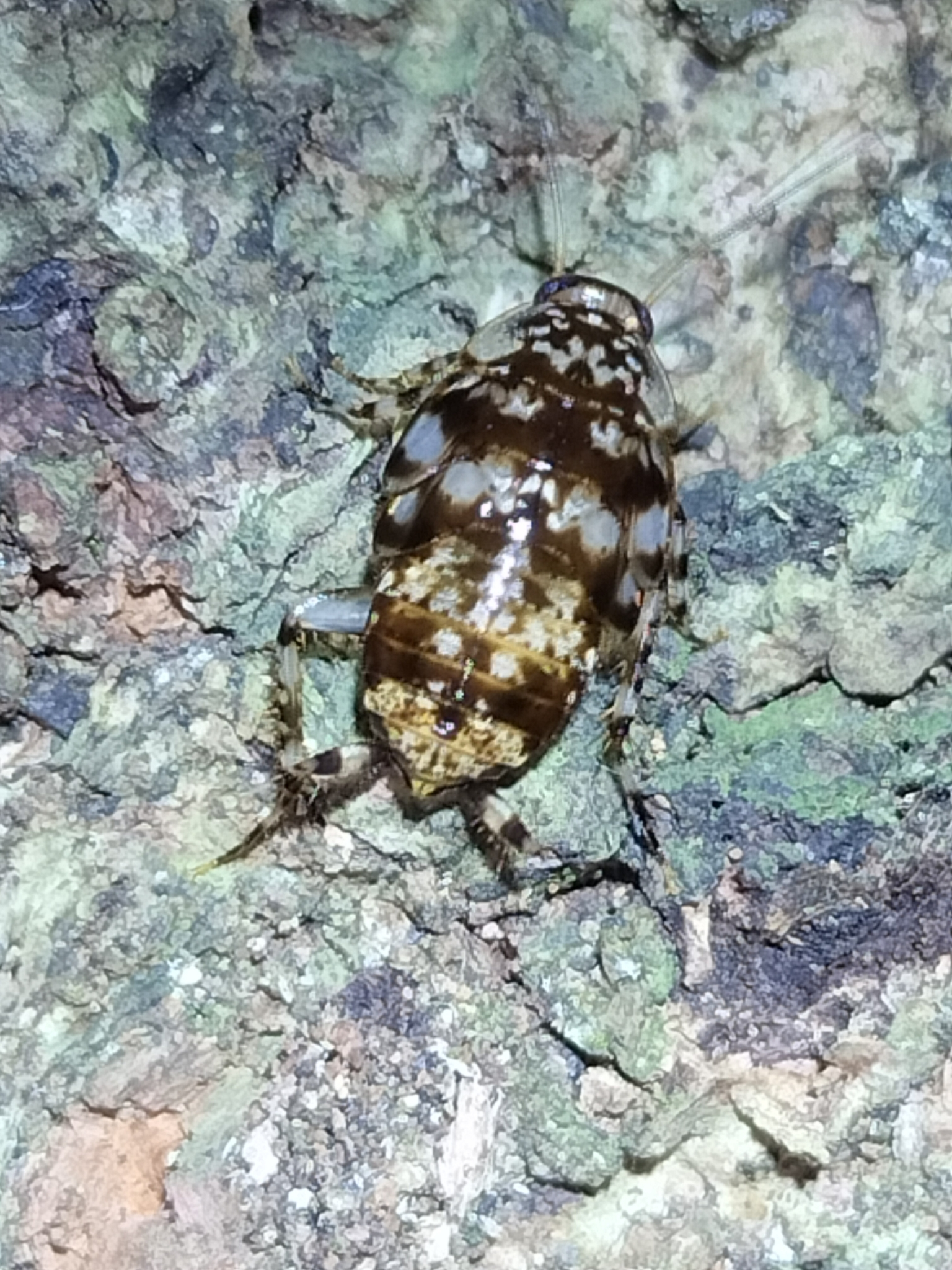

Scientific classification
- Kingdom: Animalia
- Phylum: Arthropoda
- Clade: Pancrustacea
- Class: Insecta
- Order: Blattodea
- Family: Ectobiidae
- Genus: Allacta
- Species: A. australiensis

Binomial name
- Allacta australiensis Roth, 1991

= Allacta australiensis =

Species of cockroach

Allacta australiensis is a species from the genus Allacta.
