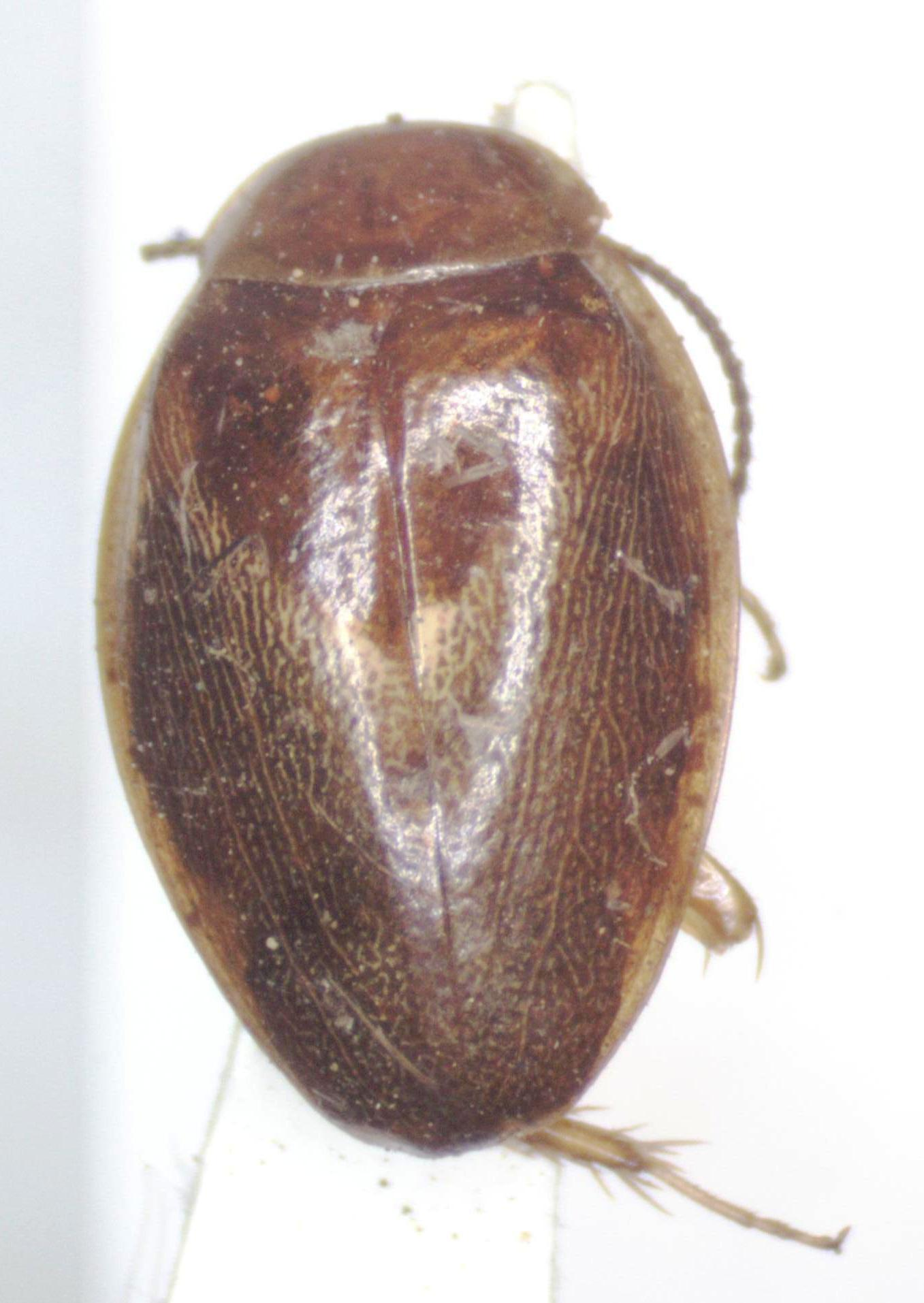
- Plectoptera pulicaria

Scientific classification
- Kingdom: Animalia
- Phylum: Arthropoda
- Clade: Pancrustacea
- Class: Insecta
- Order: Blattodea
- Family: Ectobiidae
- Subfamily: Pseudophyllodromiinae
- Genus: Plectoptera; Saussure, 1864

= Plectoptera =

Genus of cockroaches

Plectoptera is a genus of American cockroaches in the family Ectobiidae and tribe Plectopterini. There are at least 2 described species in Plectoptera.

== Species ==
- Plectoptera picta Saussure & Zehntner, 1893 (pictured beetle cockroach)
- Plectoptera poeyi (Saussure, 1862) (Florida beetle roach)
