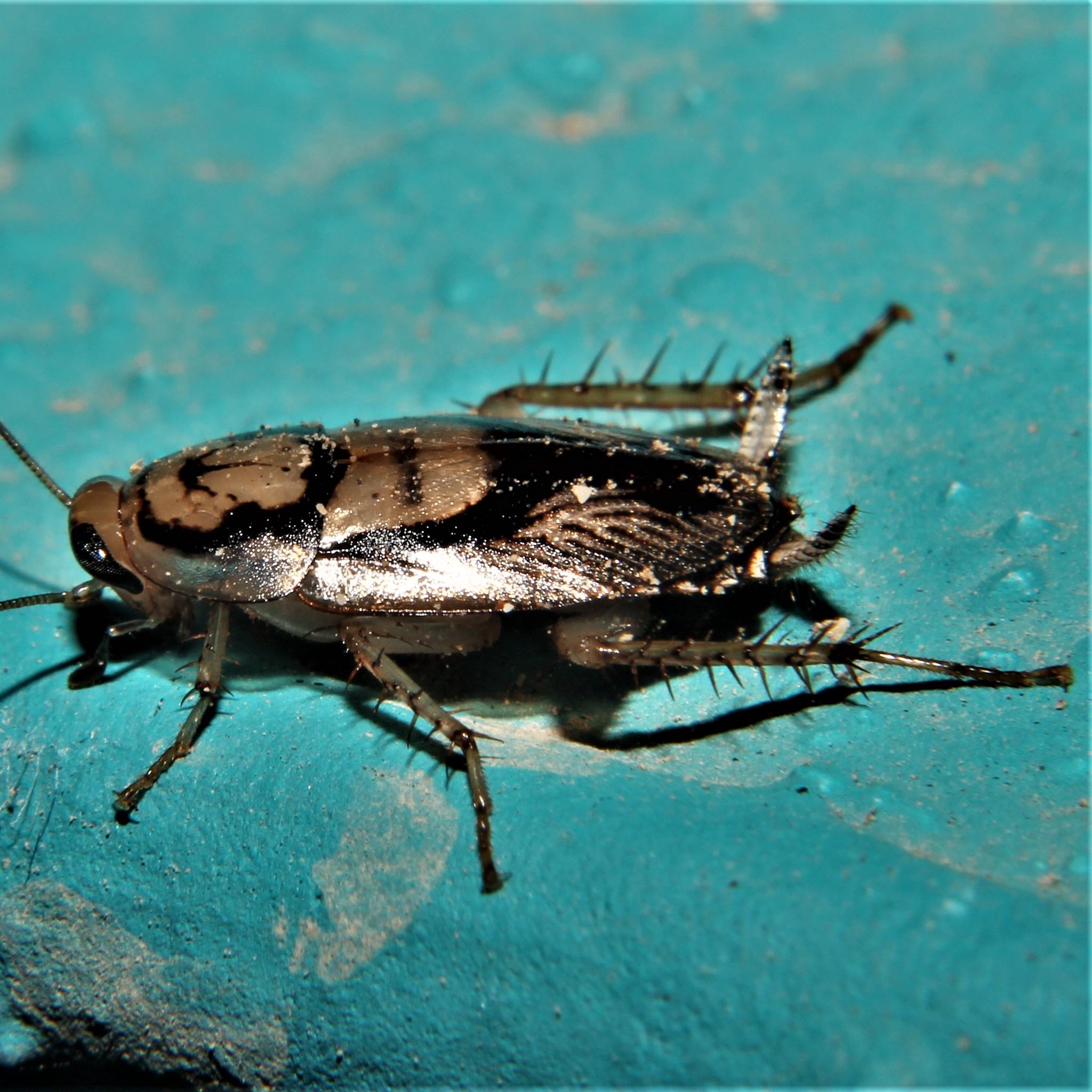
- Euthlastoblatta facies

Scientific classification
- Kingdom: Animalia
- Phylum: Arthropoda
- Clade: Pancrustacea
- Class: Insecta
- Order: Blattodea
- Family: Ectobiidae
- Subfamily: Pseudophyllodromiinae
- Genus: Euthlastoblatta; Hebard, 1917

= Euthlastoblatta =

Genus of cockroaches

Euthlastoblatta is a genus of cockroach in the family Ectobiidae. There are about nine described species in Euthlastoblatta.

== Species ==
These nine species belong to the genus Euthlastoblatta:

- Euthlastoblatta abortiva (Caudell, 1904) (fragile cockroach)
- Euthlastoblatta beckeri Lopes & Oliveira, 2005
- Euthlastoblatta compsa Hebard, 1920
- Euthlastoblatta diaphana (Fabricius, 1793)
- Euthlastoblatta facies (Walker, 1868)
- Euthlastoblatta grata Hebard, 1922
- Euthlastoblatta moralesi Princis, 1965
- Euthlastoblatta orizabae (Saussure, 1868)
- Euthlastoblatta subpectinata (Saussure & Zehntner, 1893)
