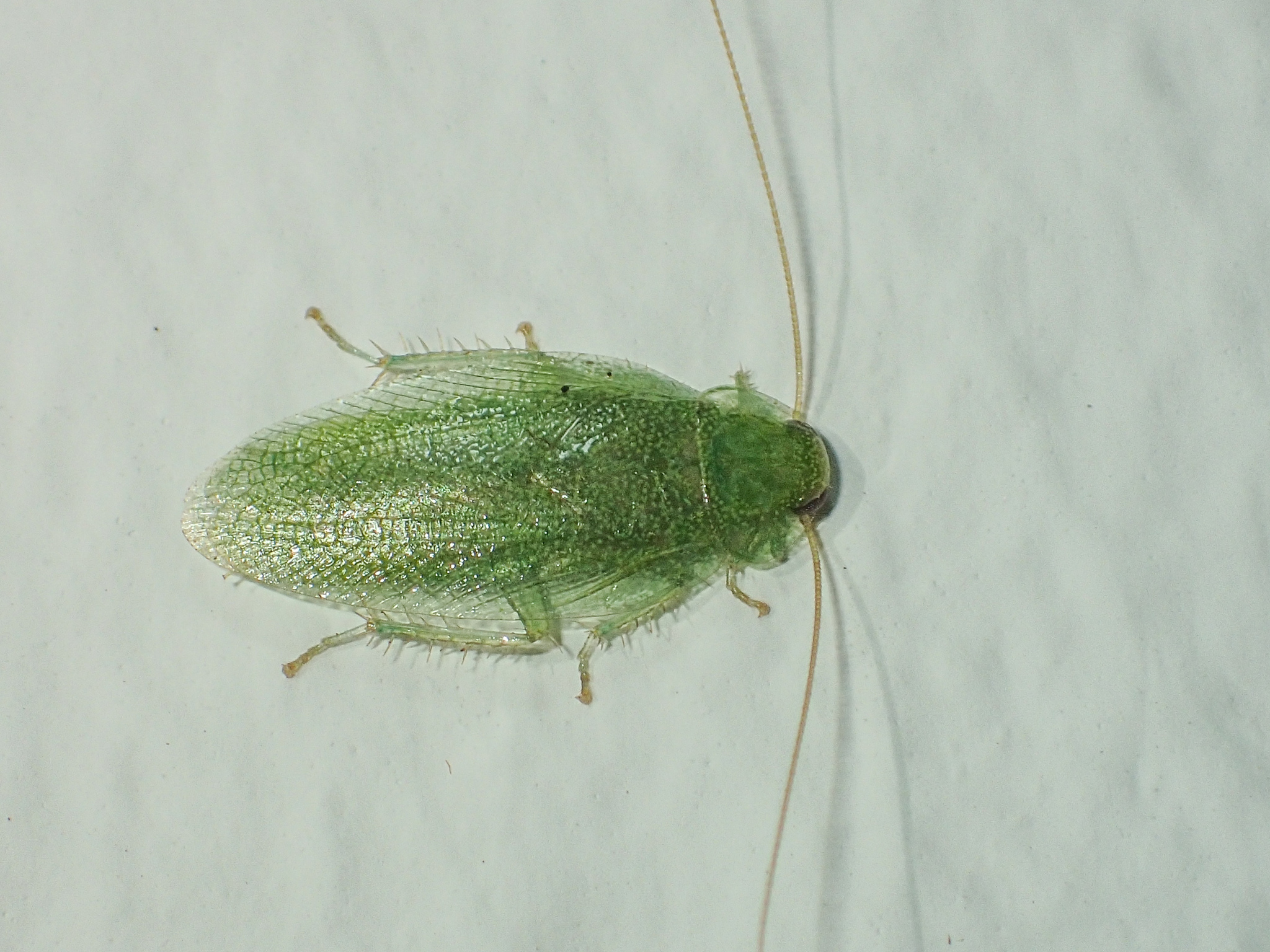

Scientific classification
- Kingdom: Animalia
- Phylum: Arthropoda
- Clade: Pancrustacea
- Class: Insecta
- Order: Blattodea
- Family: Ectobiidae
- Genus: Sorineuchora
- Species: S. viridis

Binomial name
- Sorineuchora viridis Li, Che, Zheng & Wang, 2017

= Sorineuchora viridis =

Species of cockroach

Sorineuchora viridis is a species from the genus Sorineuchora.
