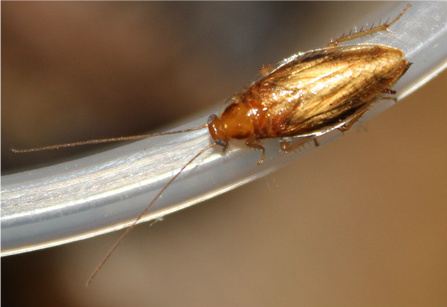
- Adult female

Scientific classification
- Kingdom: Animalia
- Phylum: Arthropoda
- Clade: Pancrustacea
- Class: Insecta
- Order: Blattodea
- Family: Ectobiidae
- Genus: Chorisoneura
- Species: C. texensis

Binomial name
- Chorisoneura texensis (Saussure & Zehntner, 1893)

Synonyms
- Chorisoneura plocea Rehn, 1904

= Chorisoneura texensis =

Species of cockroach

Chorisoneura texensis, the small Texas cockroach, is a small species of cockroach (family Ectobiidae) native to the Southeastern United States.

== Gallery ==
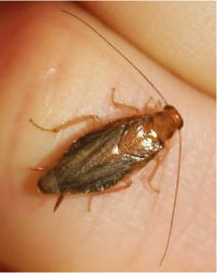
Grayish colored adult female.

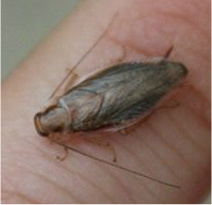
Same Grayish colored female without camera flash.

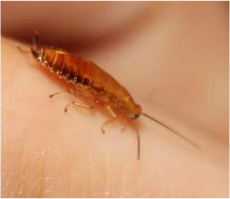
Nymph

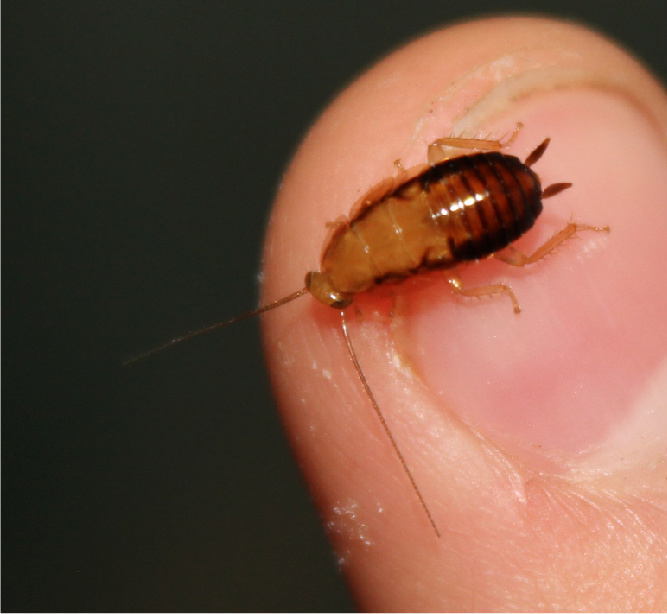
Nymph

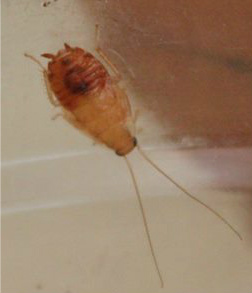
Lighter colored nymph.

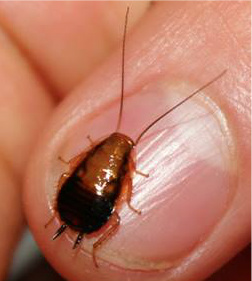
Darker colored nymph.

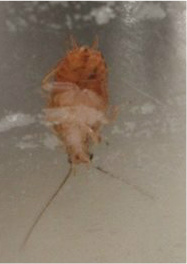
Underside of lighter colored nymph.

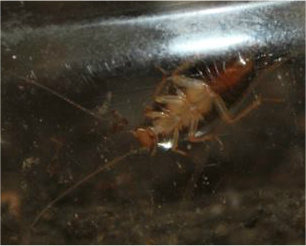
Underside of a darker colored nymph.
