= Abrodiella =

Scientific classification
- Kingdom: Animalia
- Phylum: Arthropoda
- Class: Insecta
- Order: Coleoptera
- Suborder: Adephaga
- Family: Carabidae
- Subfamily: Lebiinae
- Genus: Abrodiella; Bousquet, 2002

Genus of beetles

Abrodiella is a genus of beetles in the family Carabidae, containing the following species:

- Abrodiella amoenula (Boheman, 1848)
- Abrodiella pittoresca (Liebke, 1938)
