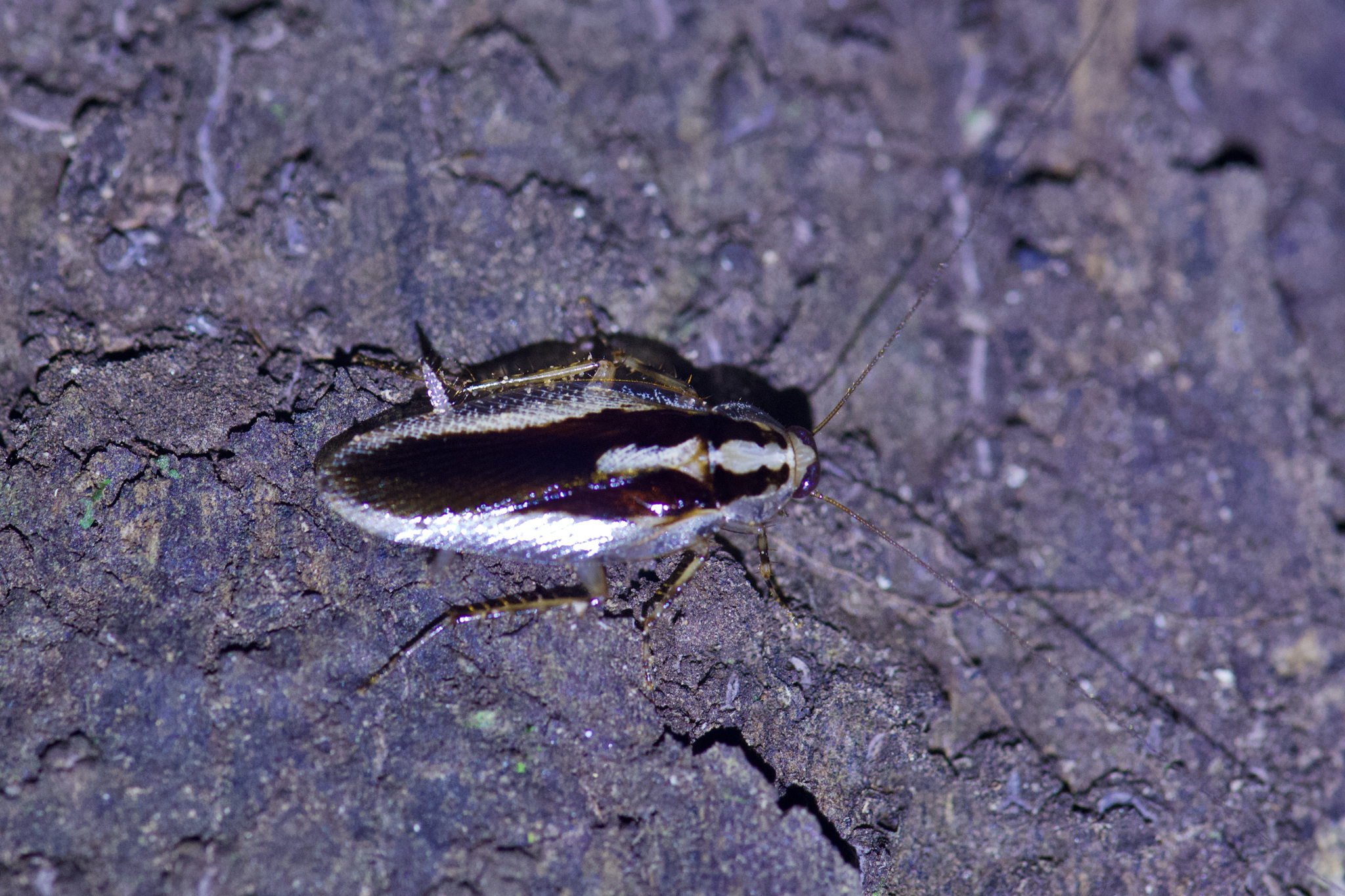

Scientific classification
- Kingdom: Animalia
- Phylum: Arthropoda
- Clade: Pancrustacea
- Class: Insecta
- Order: Blattodea
- Family: Ectobiidae
- Subfamily: Pseudophyllodromiinae
- Genus: Dendroblatta; Rehn, 1916

= Dendroblatta =

Genus of cockroaches

Dendroblatta is a genus of South American cockroaches in subfamily Pseudophyllodromiinae. It was described by James A. G. Rehn in 1916.
