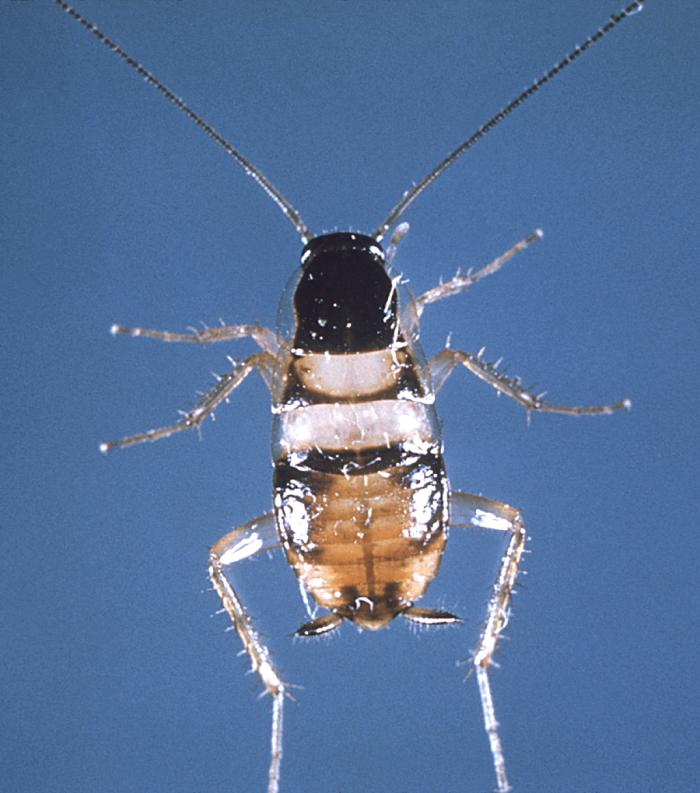

Scientific classification
- Kingdom: Animalia
- Phylum: Arthropoda
- Clade: Pancrustacea
- Class: Insecta
- Order: Blattodea
- Family: Ectobiidae
- Genus: Supella
- Species: S. longipalpa

Binomial name
- Supella longipalpa Fabricius, 1798

Synonyms
- Supella cubensis (Saussure, 1862); Supella extenuata (Walker, 1868); Supella incisa (Walker, 1868); Supella phalerata (Saussure, 1863); Supella quadriplaga (Walker, 1868); Supella subfasciata (Walker, 1871); Supella supellectilium (Serville, 1838); Supella transversalis (Walker, 1871); Supella vacillans (Walker, 1868)

= Brown-banded cockroach =

Species of cockroach

The brown-banded cockroach (Supella longipalpa) is a species of small cockroach, measuring about 10 to 14 mm long and the most well-known in the genus Supella. It is tan to light brown and has two light-colored bands across the wings and abdomen, which may sometimes appear to be broken or irregular but are quite noticeable. The bands may be partly obscured by the wings. The male has wings that cover the abdomen, while the female has wings that do not cover the abdomen completely. The male appears more slender than the female, the female appears wider.

== Distribution ==
The brown-banded cockroach has a fairly wide distribution, being found in the northeastern, southern, and midwest regions of the United States quite commonly. They are one of the most recent alien cockroaches to form breeding colonies in Britain and Ireland. They need less moisture than the German cockroach so they tend to be more broadly distributed in the home, such as in living rooms and bedrooms. They can often be found in homes and apartments, but are less common in restaurants. They tend not to be found in the daytime, since they avoid light.

In an experiment by Tsai and Chi they found that populations of brown-banded cockroaches would be expected to thrive in environments with a temperature between 25 and 33 °C.

== Diet ==
The brown-banded cockroach eats a wide variety of items.

In an experiment by Cohen and colleagues they found that the larva of the brown-banded cockroach when given a choice will choose a casein:glucose ratio of 15.5:84.5. The larvae that ate only casein died early in the experiment, a few larvae that ate only glucose survived past the larval stage but did not make it to adulthood. A decline in consumption of carbohydrates was seen at the time of first and second moults.

== Physiology ==
Prakash and colleagues explain that the brown-banded cockroach has five segmented maxillary palps and the most distal fifth segment has the largest segment with the most variety of sensilla. With the variety of shapes and sizes of the maxillary it is expected that they would have a variety of functions. In Prakash and colleagues experiment they observed that the curved edge of fifth segment that remained most ventral and probes the substratum with it during foraging. On the fifth segment parallel to the curved ventral edge on the medial surface is a longitudinal furrow that's densely lined with papillaform sensilla. The shaft of the papilla has a longitudinal slit near the distal tip, allowing dendrites of the sensillum to sense the external environment. These dendrites proceed in a wavy form through the shaft of the sensillum. The sensillum contains antennal glomeruli, suggesting that it has an olfactory role. Prakash and colleagues suggest that since the location of this sensilla is in the maxillary palp that this is a short-range olfactory detector for the micro-environment. The olfactory sensilla on the antenna and the double-walled sensilla on both palps probably serve as long-range odour sensors. The maxillary and labial palps show sexual dimorphism which suggests involvement in courtship. Females have more sensilla chaetica on both appendages than males whereas, males have more chemosensilla on the maxillary palps and taste sensilla on the labial palps.

According to Schal and colleagues the site of sex pheromone production in the female Supella longipalpa is located on the fourth and fifth abdominal tergites. Cuticular pores occur on all tergites, but the density is highest on the lateral margins of the fourth and fifth tergites. Each pore is connected via a long duct to modified epidermal cells, suggesting that these structures are involved in pheromone production.

== Sex pheromone ==
The brown-banded cockroach has been the model in many studies about sex pheromones. Cockroaches rely on pheromones for many reproductive behaviours, including bringing the sexes together for mating. Their sex pheromones can be divided into two categories: cuticular compounds that elicit sexual responses after the sexes contact and volatile compounds that act over a distance.

The female brown-banded cockroach emits a sex pheromone that attracts males. Charlton and colleagues isolated and identified the pheromone as 5-(2,4-dimethylheptanyl)-3-methyl-2H-pyran-2-one which they refer to as supellapyrone. A blend of synthetic compound elicited behavioural and electrophysiological responses comparable to the natural pheromone. This sex pheromone can be synthesized by direct coupling of a brominated pryoned with an alkylzanic reagent. The stereochemistry of the natural pheromone was assigned by a combination of synthesis, chiral gas chromatography, and electrophysiological measurement. They key step in synthesizing the three stereoisomers of this pheromone is employing lipase-catalyzed desymmetrization or enantiomer separation of syn- or anti-2,4-dimethylpentane-1,5-diol. Supellapyrone has four configurations but female brown-banded cockroaches can only produce the RR isomer. In an experiment by Gemono and colleagues they found that the males are attracted to the RR isomer but they are also highly attracted to the SR isomer. Males also responded to SS isomer but the RS isomer elicited little to no response from any males.

The regulation of the female sex pheromone production, calling behaviour and release is regulated directly and indirectly by the corpora allata and juvenile hormone. Smith and Schal came to this conclusion because both pheromone production and calling failed to occur after allatectomy; both pheromone production and calling could be restored by a corpora allata implantation or treatment with juvenile hormones; applications of a juvenile hormones to intact females advanced the age of pheromone production and NCA-I transection, which activates the copora allata in other cockroaches, advanced the age of pheromone production and calling.

Oöcyte growth in the brown-banded cockroach correlated with corpora allata activity in vitro. Ovariectomies were conducted: both pheromone production and calling were unaffected by either nymphs or adults, this was done to demonstrate that the ovaries do not mediate in the regulation of pheromone production. The role of juvenile hormone in pheromone production appears to be regulated by neural and humoral feedbacks.

Calling ceases in an adult female after mating and does not resume throughout the duration of the insects life. Calling was suppressed and oöcyte growth was stimulated by the presence of a spermatophore, by the implantation of a spermatophore and by mating with vasectomized males. Odthecal deposition in females mated with vasectomized males caused calling to resume. Smith and Schal found that ventral nerve cord transections, either immediately following copulation or after odthecal deposition, restored calling in mated females. Their experimental evidence suggested that termination of calling is moderated neurally by a two-stage process, initiated by placement of the spermatophore and maintained by the presence of sperm in the spermatheca.
