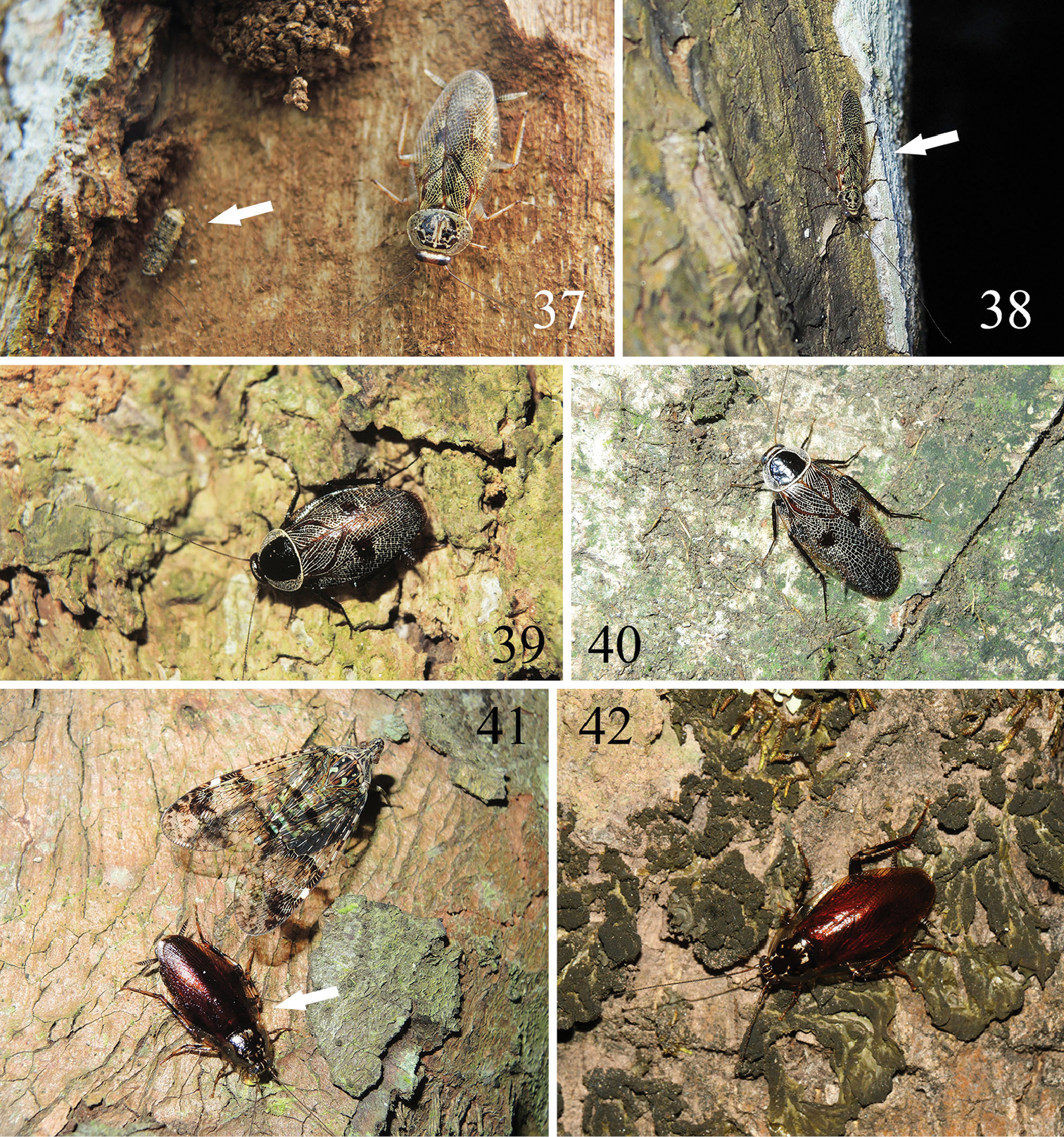

Scientific classification
- Kingdom: Animalia
- Phylum: Arthropoda
- Clade: Pancrustacea
- Class: Insecta
- Order: Blattodea
- Family: Ectobiidae
- Subfamily: Pseudophyllodromiinae
- Genus: Allacta; Saussure & Zehntner, 1895

Synonyms
- Abrodiaeta Brunner von Wattenwyl, 1893; Arublatta Bruijning, 1947; Compsosilpha Princis, 1950; Euhanitschia Princis, 1950; Pseudochorisoblatta Bruijning, 1948

= Allacta =

Genus of cockroaches

Allacta is a genus of SE Asian and Australian cockroaches in the subfamily Pseudophyllodromiinae.

== Species ==
The Cockroach Species File includes:

1. Allacta arborifera (Walker, 1868)
2. Allacta australiensis Roth, 1991
3. Allacta basivittata (Bruijning, 1947)
4. Allacta bimaculata Bey-Bienko, 1969
5. Allacta bipunctata (Walker, 1869)
6. Allacta brossuti Roth, 1995
7. Allacta confluens (Hanitsch, 1925)
8. Allacta deleportei Roth, 1995
9. Allacta diagrammatica (Hanitsch, 1923)
10. Allacta diluta (Saussure, 1863)
11. Allacta fascia Roth, 1993
12. Allacta figurata (Walker, 1871)
13. Allacta funebris (Walker, 1868)
14. Allacta gautieri Roth, 1995
15. Allacta grandcolasi Roth, 1995
16. Allacta hamifera (Walker, 1868)
17. Allacta immunda (Brunner von Wattenwyl, 1893)
18. Allacta interrupta (Hanitsch, 1925)
19. Allacta jcenpro Senraj, Packiam, Prabakaran, Lucañas & Jaiswal, 2021
20. Allacta kalakadensis Prabakaran & Senraj, 2019
21. Allacta karnyi (Hanitsch, 1928)
22. Allacta kollimalai Senraj, Packiam, Prabakaran, Lucañas & Jaiswal, 2021
23. Allacta labyrinthica (Hanitsch, 1927)
24. Allacta loconti Roth, 1993
25. Allacta luteomarginata (Hanitsch, 1923)
26. Allacta maculicollis (Hanitsch, 1927)
27. Allacta mcgavini Roth, 1991
28. Allacta megamaculata Roth, 1995
29. Allacta megaspila (Walker, 1868)
30. Allacta modesta (Brunner von Wattenwyl, 1893) - type species (as Abrodiaeta modesta Brunner von Wattenwyl)
31. Allacta nalepae Roth, 1995
32. Allacta ornata Bey-Bienko, 1969
33. Allacta pantherina (Hanitsch, 1933)
34. Allacta parva Shelford, 1906
35. Allacta persoonsi Roth, 1995
36. Allacta picturata (Shelford, 1907)
37. Allacta polygrapha (Walker, 1868)
38. Allacta puncticollis (Brunner von Wattenwyl, 1898)
39. Allacta robusta Bey-Bienko, 1969
40. Allacta srengi Roth, 1995
41. Allacta straatmani Roth, 1995
42. Allacta svensonorum Roth, 1995
43. Allacta transversa Bey-Bienko, 1969
44. Allacta vellimalai Senraj, Packiam, Prabakaran, Lucañas & Jaiswal, 2021
45. Allacta xizangensis Wang, Gui, Che & Wang, 2014
