= Sorineuchora =

Scientific classification
- Kingdom: Animalia
- Phylum: Arthropoda
- Clade: Pancrustacea
- Class: Insecta
- Order: Blattodea
- Family: Ectobiidae
- Genus: Sorineuchora; Caudell, 1927

Genus of cockroaches

Sorineuchora is a genus of cockroaches in the family Ectobiidae.

== Taxonomy ==
Sorineuchora contains the following species:

- Sorineuchora viridis
- Sorineuchora shanensis
- Sorineuchora atriceps
- Sorineuchora bivitta
- Sorineuchora javanica
- Sorineuchora lativitrea
- Sorineuchora pallens
- Sorineuchora punctipennis
- Sorineuchora setshuana
- Sorineuchora undulata
- Sorineuchora bimaculata
- Sorineuchora hispida
- Sorineuchora nigra
- Sorineuchora formosana
