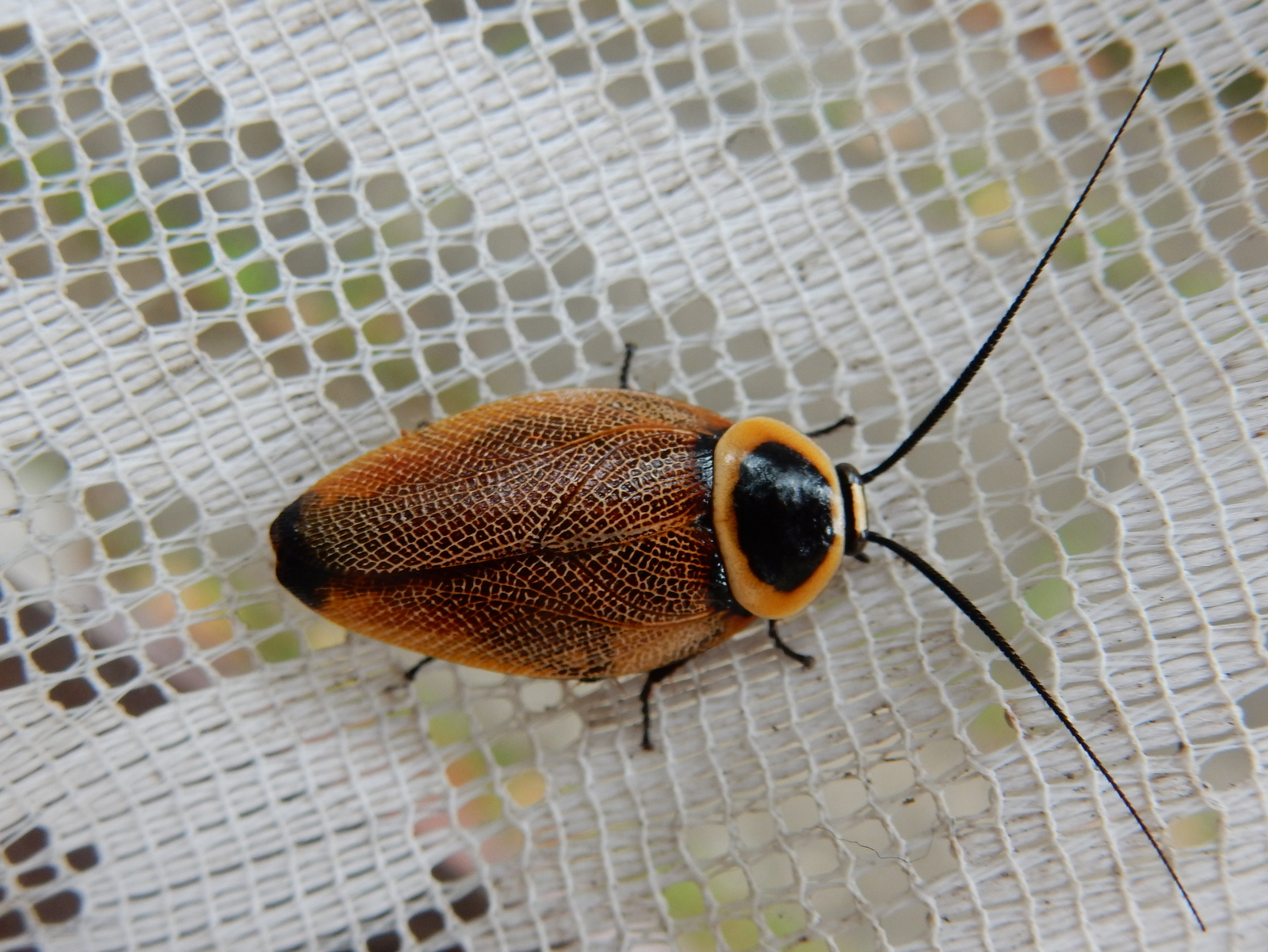

Scientific classification
- Kingdom: Animalia
- Phylum: Arthropoda
- Clade: Pancrustacea
- Class: Insecta
- Order: Blattodea
- Family: Ectobiidae
- Genus: Ellipsidion
- Species: E. australe

Binomial name
- Ellipsidion australe Saussure, 1863

= Ellipsidion australe =

Species of cockroach

Ellipsidion australe, or the eastern ellipsidion, or bush cockroach, is a harmless species of cockroach native to Australia and found in New South Wales, the Northern Territory, Queensland, and Victoria. The species was first described in 1863 as Thyrsocera australis by Henri de Saussure.

== Gallery ==
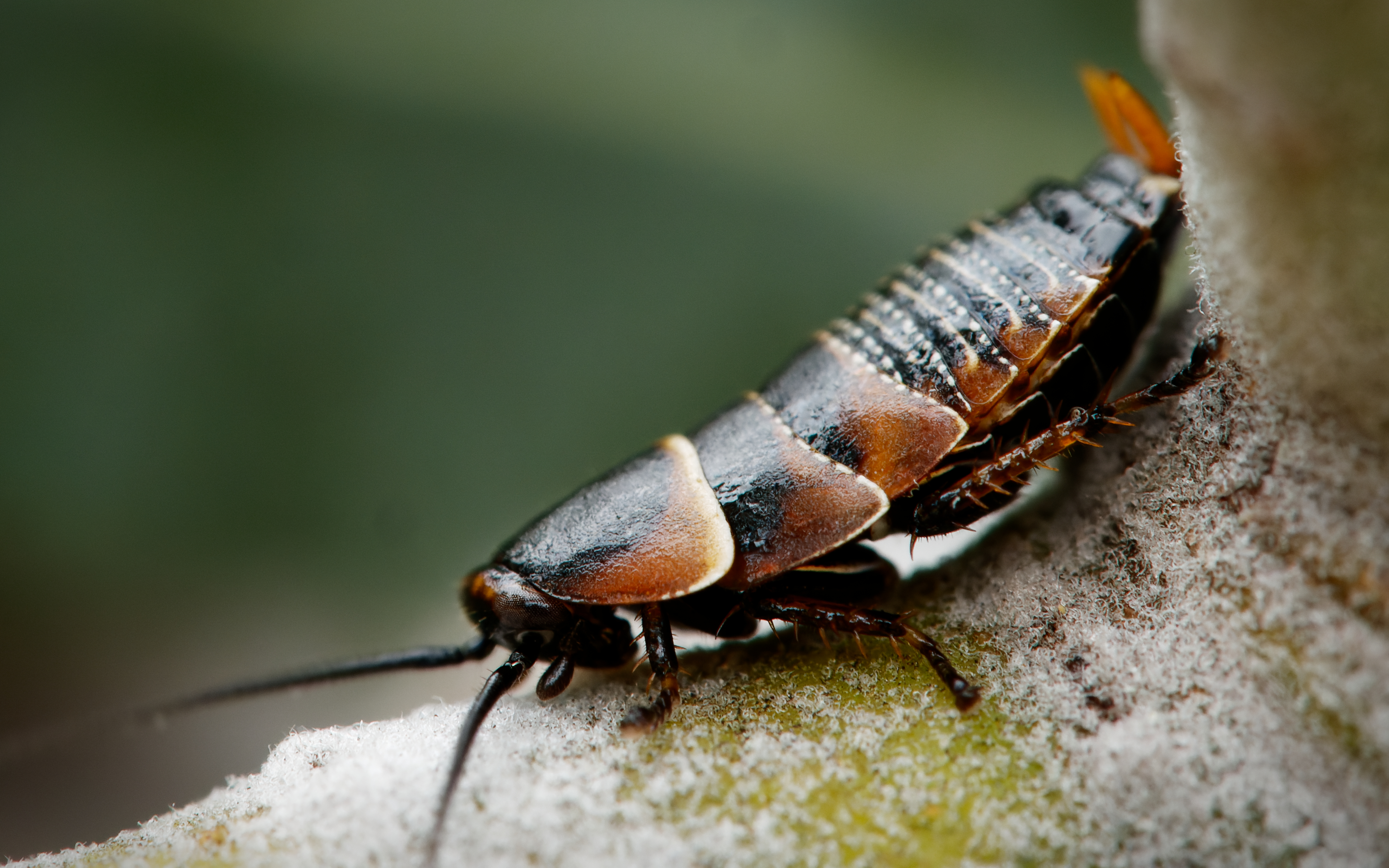

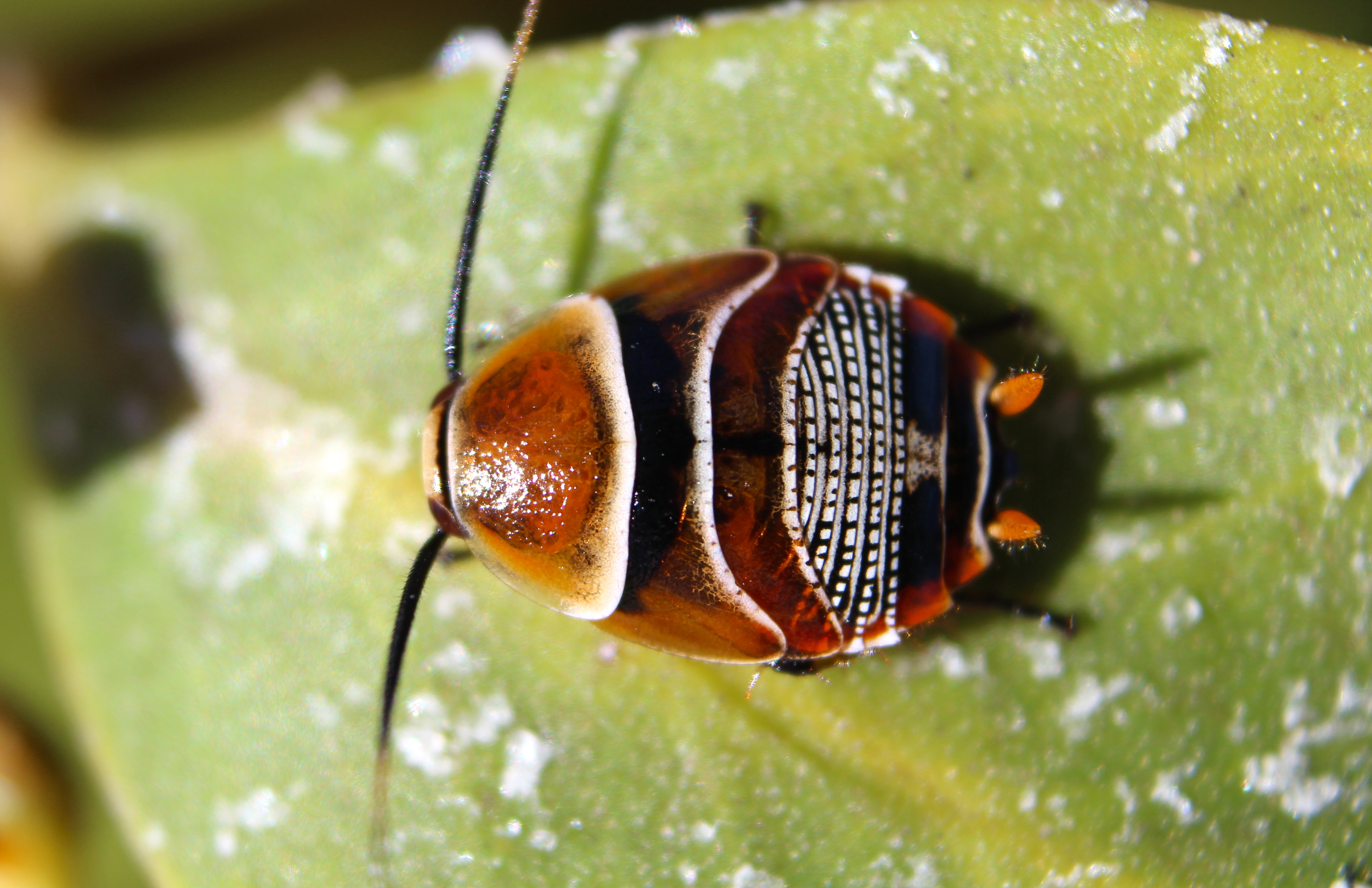

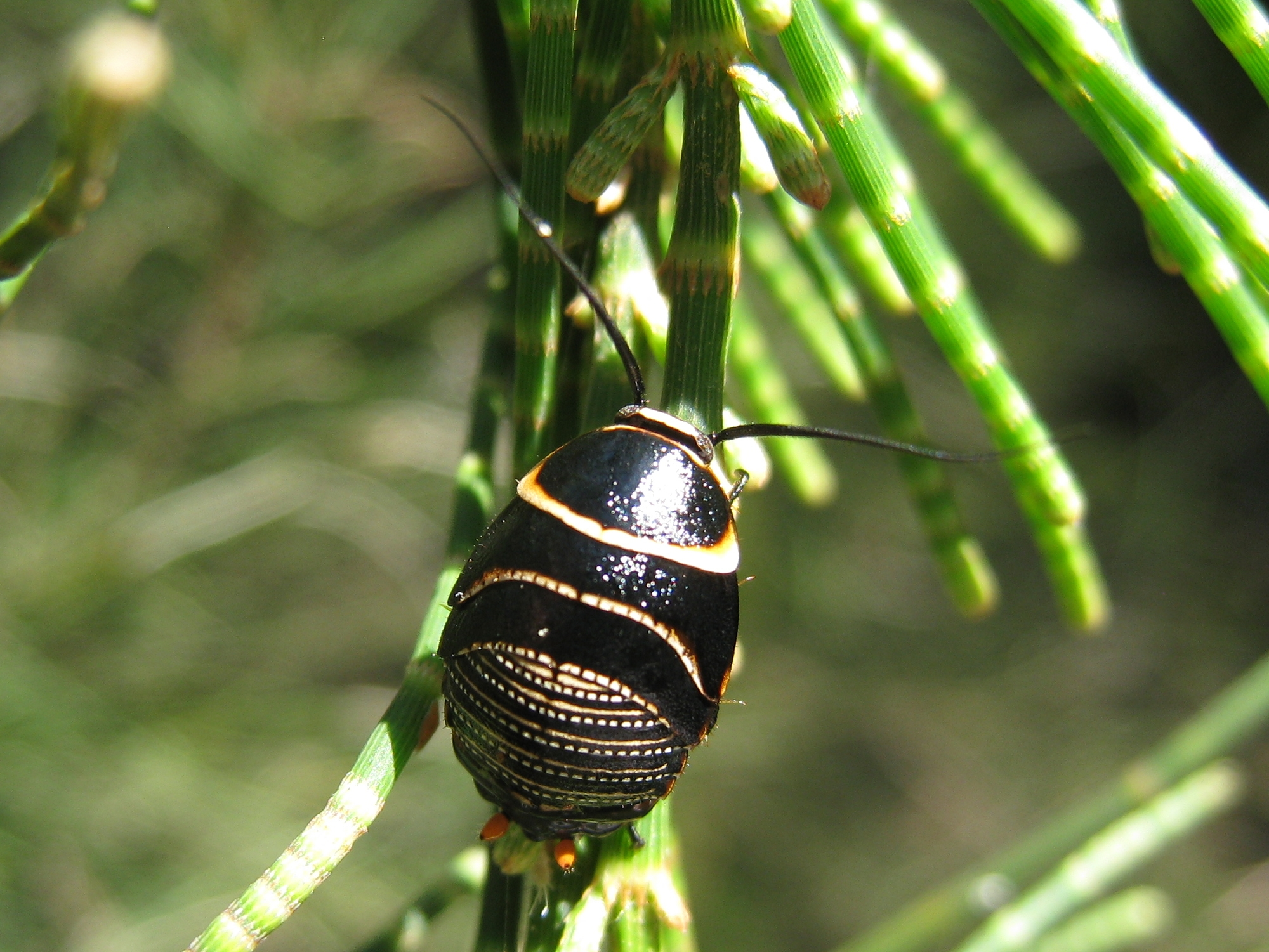
