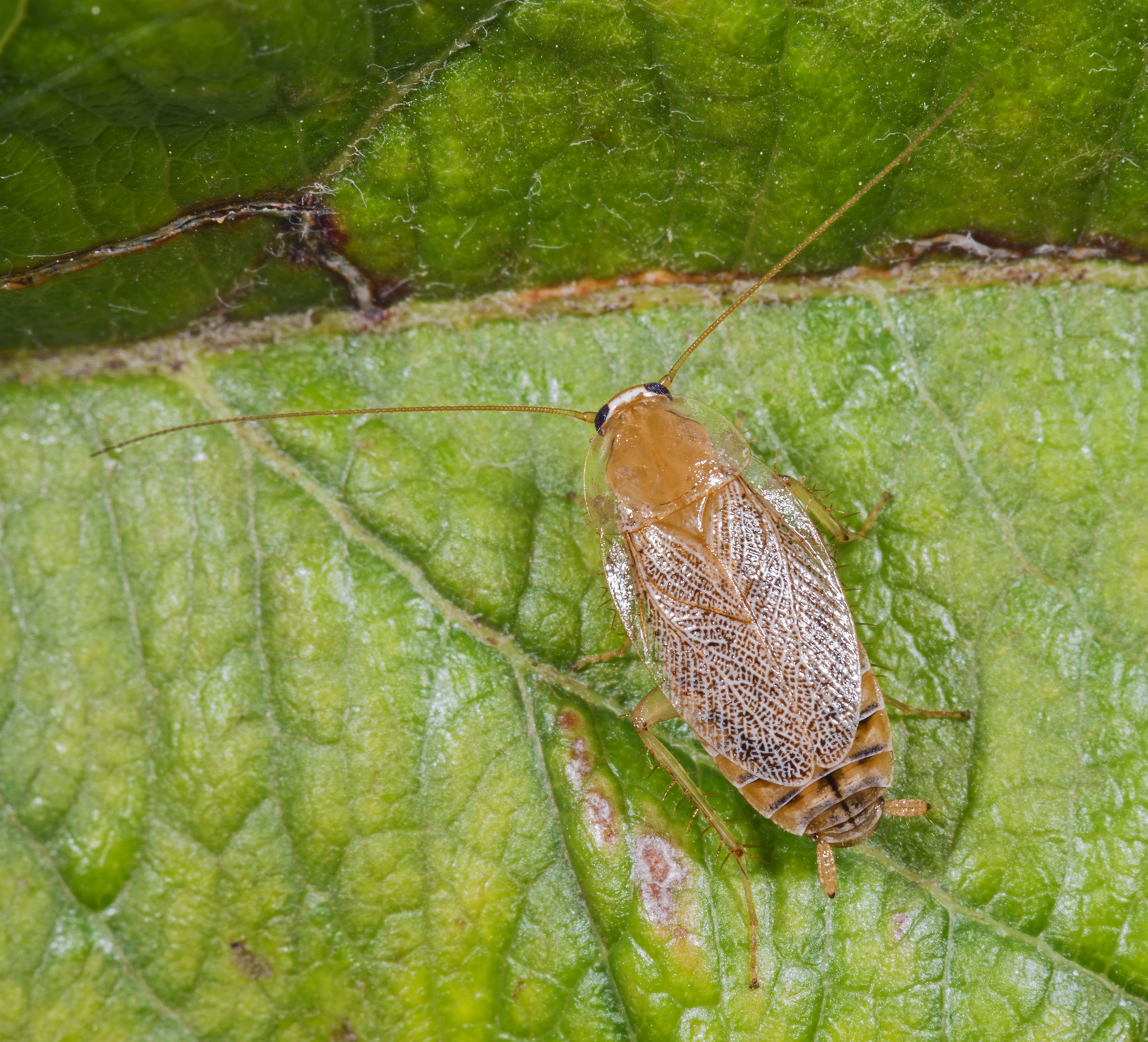
- Planuncus tingitanus s.l. (f)

Scientific classification
- Kingdom: Animalia
- Phylum: Arthropoda
- Class: Insecta
- Order: Blattodea
- Family: Ectobiidae
- Genus: Planuncus
- Species complex: P. tingitanus s.l.

Binomial name
- Planuncus tingitanus s.l. (Bolivar, 1914)

Species
- See text

= Planuncus tingitanus s.l. =

Species of cockroach

Planuncus tingitanus s.l. is a working title for any of the species belonging to the Planuncus tingitanus species group, of the cockroach genus Planuncus (Blattodea: Ectobiinae). As the exact status of some the species in this group can not be determined without more research, the whole species complex is referred to by the name of the oldest species in the group sensu lato (hence the "s.l.").

As such, Planuncus tingitanus s.l. refers to an adventive species, or possibly a complex of cryptic species, that has dramatically expanded its range over the southern parts of Northwestern Europe in a very short period of time during the first decades of the 21st century. In Britain it is known as the variable cockroach, due to the variability of its abdominal markings.

== Species complex? ==
The animals spreading across Europe are closely related, or possibly even synonymous to Ectobius perspicillaris tingitanus Bolivar, 1914 (later treated as a species in its own right: Ectobius tingitanus), originally described from the most northern part of Morocco. Furthermore, they cannot be easily distinguished on any constant morphological traits from Ectobius finoti Chopard 1943, described from Algeria (it had been suggested before that finoti and tingitanus might need to be synonymized). Finally, a third name was added to the mix, when Ectobius vinzi Maurel 2012 was described from France as a new species, after the invaders had become prominently omnipresent in that country.

Until more genetic and morphological research is done it cannot be determined with any certainty if all or some of these species should be synonymized or if maybe even more cryptic species need to be identified. Therefore, Bohn et al. (2013) prefer to identify the animals adventively spreading over Northwestern Europe, as well as the North African specimen (other than the types) as "belonging to the tingitanus-complex". As such, the various species names refer to the respective type specimen exclusively. Meanwhile, they erected a new genus Planuncus to group these species with some other closely related (but clearly distinct) species previously in Ectobius and Phyllodromica. Also, a subgenus (Planuncus) was created to hold the species of this tingitanus-group:

- Planuncus (Planuncus) tingitanus (Bolivar, 1914) (org. Ectobius perspicillaris tingitanus)
- Planuncus (Planuncus) finoti (Chopard, 1943) (org. Ectobius finoti)
- Planuncus (Planuncus) vinzi (Maurel, 2012) (org. Ectobius vinzi)

== Range expansion ==
Animals of this species (or group) had been known from Spain and southern France at least since the 80s/90s of the 20th century and at least as early as 2005 they have been rapidly expanding north, with first records from Germany dating back to 2007 and records from Great Britain and Belgium since 2011 and 2012 respectively. This was already being monitored by cockroach researcher Horst Bohn and others, but nothing had been published on the matter yet, as there was some doubt on the exact identification, in part due to lack of recent material for genetic analysis from the type locations of Ectobius tingitanus and Ectobius finoti.

Meanwhile, these animals had become hard to miss in France, and were partially being misidentified as Ectobius eckerleini or other species, but eventually published as a new species: Ectobius vinzi Maurel, 2012. Maurel only considered known European species and not the North African species that are a very close match (or even identical). Now, Bohn et al. were prompted to publish the (preliminary) results of their studies "as is", without conclusive (molecular) evidence for the status of the species concerned. Nevertheless resulting in the new genus Planuncus Bohn, 2013.

Specimen from different locations in the newly inhabited range sometimes seem to show slight morphological differences, but not necessarily clearly more than individual variability. Given the sudden, notable range expansion a speciation process might also be considered.

== Habitat and humans ==
Quite similar to Ectobius vittiventris, another species of Ectobiinae rapidly moving north in Europe, the animals seem to be more or less dependent on human activity, both for their range expansion and for survival. Being of southern origin, it is not surprising that they seem to thrive best in the relatively warm and sheltered environments provided by buildings and parks or gardens in towns. In this respect they will live much closer to humans than what would be normal for the native species of Ectobiinae and can readily be found on the walls of buildings and may even stray inside. Contrary to similar looking cockroaches such as the German cockroach they will however not likely procreate indoors and as such need not be considered to be a household pest.

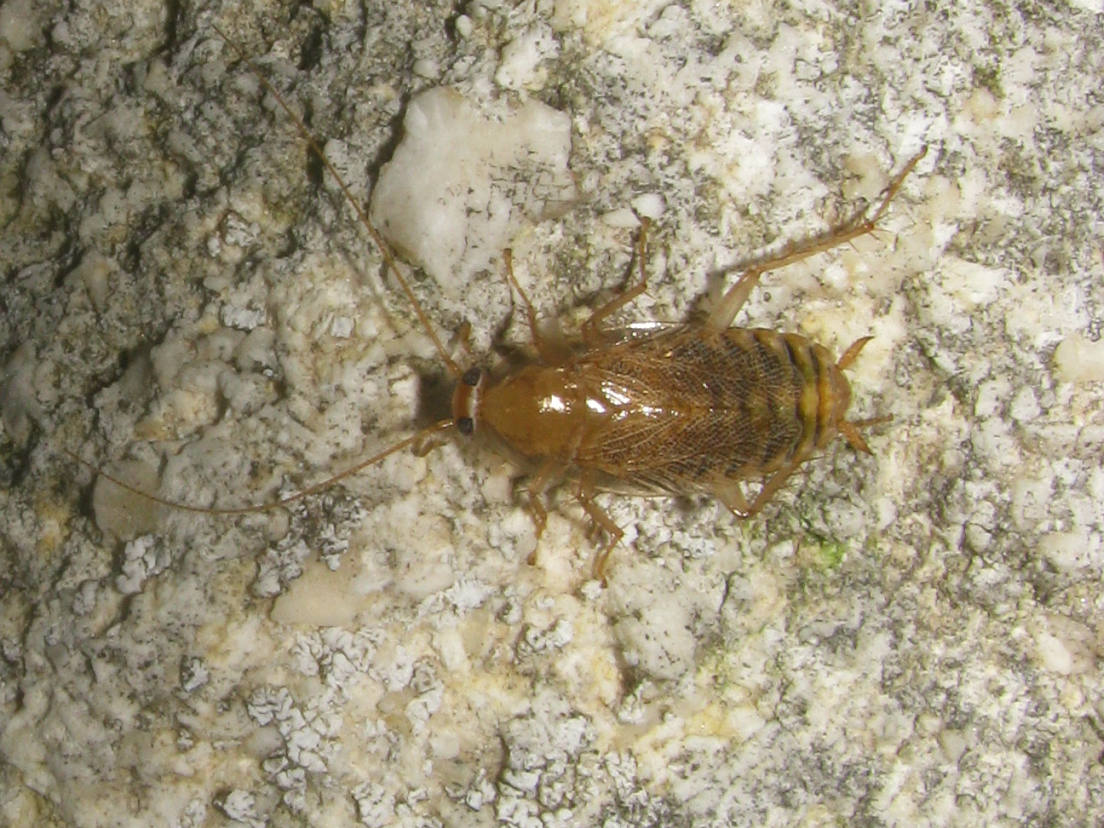
Female on wall

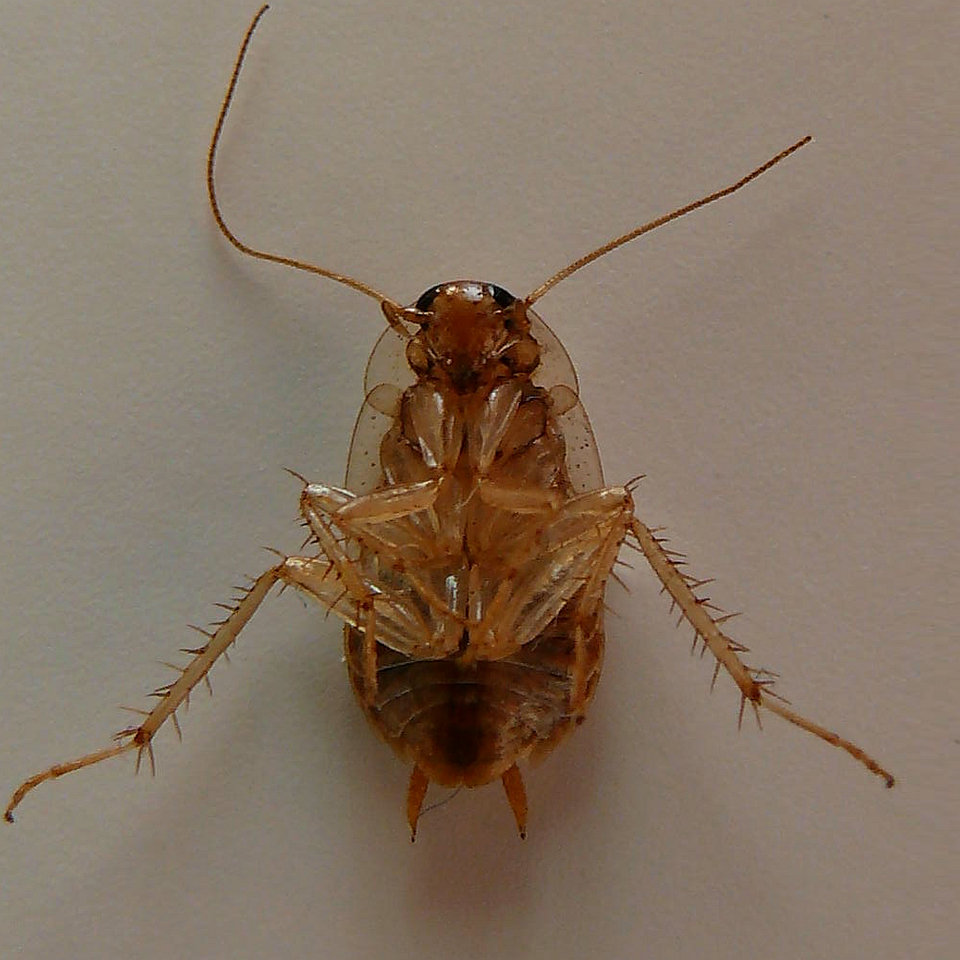
Female, ventral

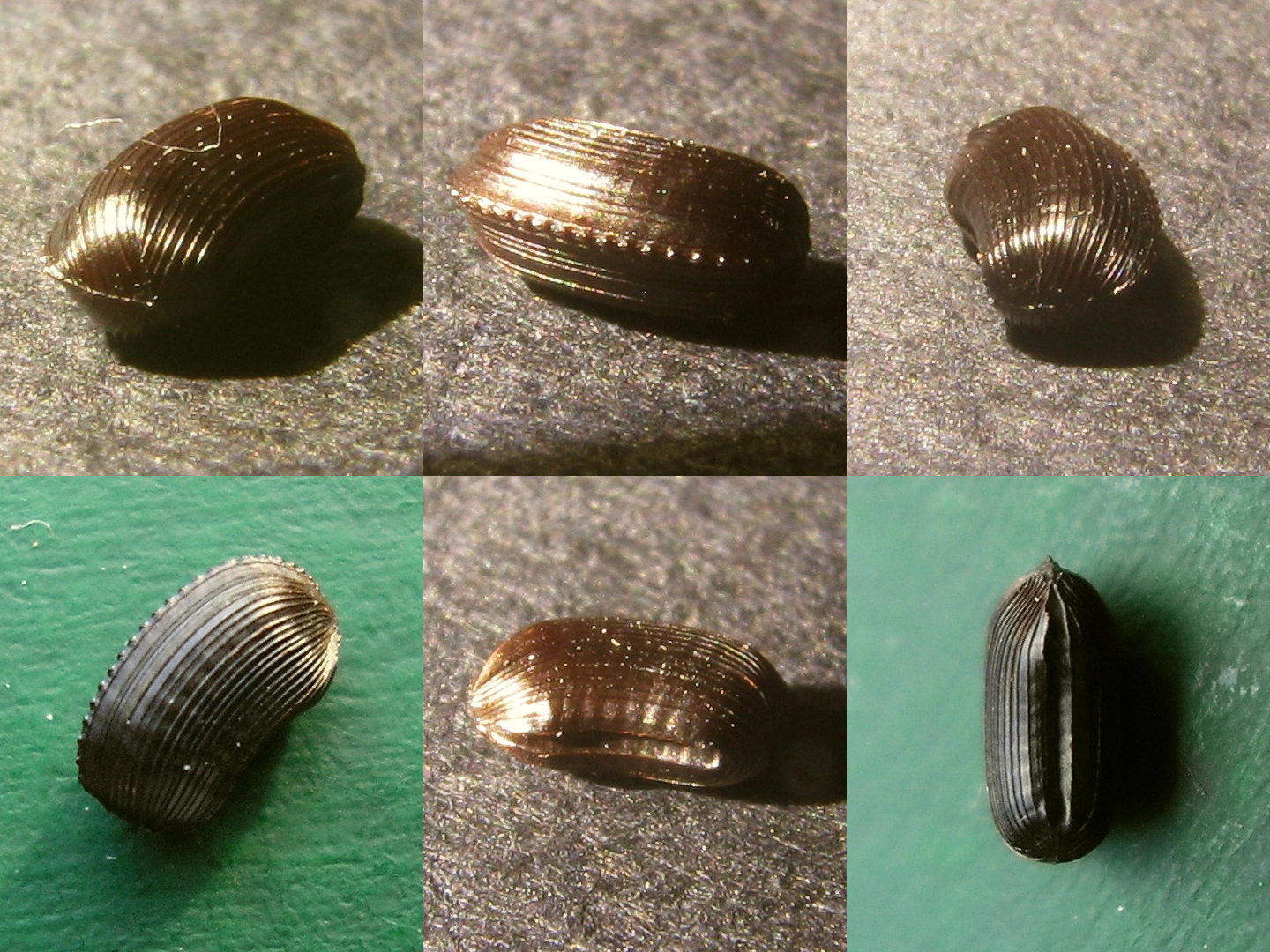
Ootheca

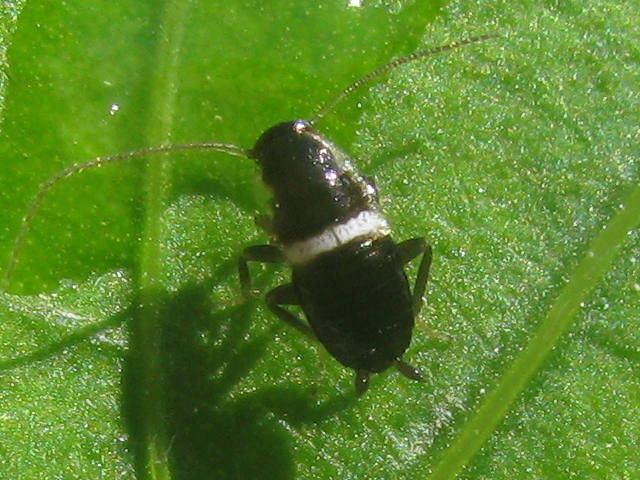
early instar nymph
