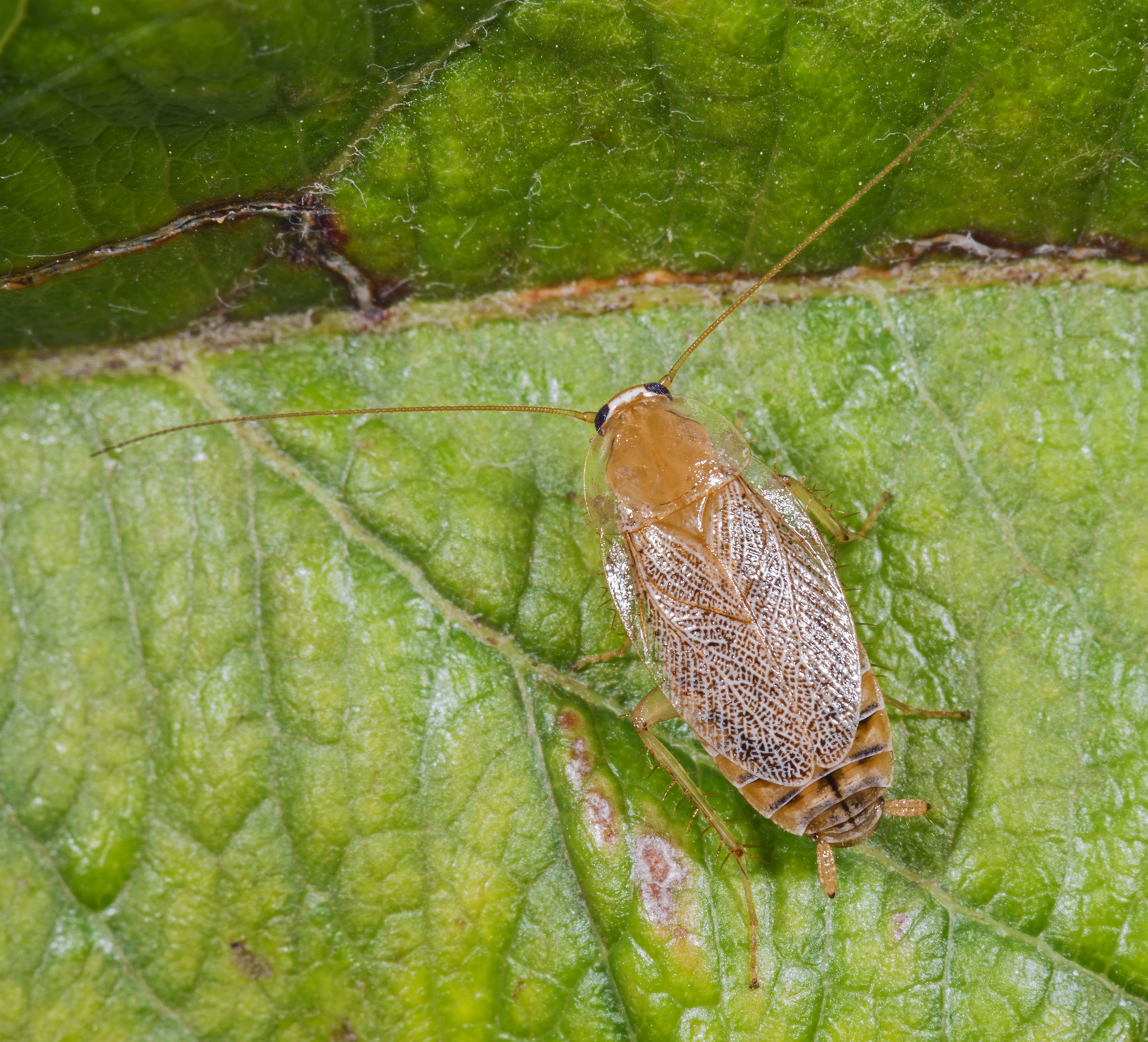
- Planuncus tingitanus s.l. (f)

Scientific classification
- Kingdom: Animalia
- Phylum: Arthropoda
- Clade: Pancrustacea
- Class: Insecta
- Order: Blattodea
- Family: Ectobiidae
- Subfamily: Ectobiinae
- Genus: Planuncus; Bohn, 2013

Species
- See article text

= Planuncus =

Genus of cockroaches

Planuncus is a genus of cockroaches native to Old World (especially Europe) described by Bohn in 2013 and belonging to the family Ectobiidae, subfamily Ectobiinae.

The genus was only recently erected in an ongoing effort to create better groupings of species in the Ectobiinae and is composed of species previously classified as Ectobius and Phyllodromica that share a number of characters to set these off from other species in these genera. The defining characters are mainly in the male genitalia and subgenital plate, so externally the species of the genus are not clearly separable by a common denominator from the remaining species still in the genera Ectobius or Phyllodromica.

== Subgenera ==
From the start, three subgenera are defined to further group the species within the genus Planuncus, containing the species listed below (types are listed in bold):

=== Subgenus Planuncus ===
This subgenus comprises the species that might previously have been addressed as the tingitanus-group of the genus Ectobius, including the recently described Ectobius vinzi. Formal classification of the species in this group awaits further research and some or all may or may not prove to be synonymous in the near future. For the time being the species group (or subgenus for that matter) might also be addressed as Planuncus tingitanus s.l..

All species in the subgenus had previously been classified in the genus Ectobius:

- **Planuncus (Planuncus) tingitanus (Bolivar, 1914)** (org. Ectobius perspicillaris tingitanus)
- Planuncus (Planuncus) finoti (Chopard, 1943) (org. Ectobius finoti)
- Planuncus (Planuncus) vinzi (Maurel, 2012) (org. Ectobius vinzi)

=== Subgenus Margundatus ===
This is basically the baetica-group of the genus Phyllodromica as had been previously formalized by Bohn (1992), but now classified under Planuncus to better reflect the affinities to other species.

All species in this subgenus had previously been classified in the genus Phyllodromica:

- **Planuncus (Margundatus) baeticus (Bolivar, 1884)** (org. Aphlebia baetica)
- Planuncus (Margundatus) agenjoi (Harz, 1971) (org. Phyllodromica agenjoi)
- Planuncus (Margundatus) erythrurus (Bohn, 1992) (org. Phyllodromica erythrura)
- Planuncus (Margundatus) intermedius (Bohn, 1992) (org. Phyllodromica intermedia)
- Planuncus (Margundatus) krausei (Bohn, 1992) (org. Phyllodromica krausei)
- Planuncus (Margundatus) maculosus (Bohn, 1992) (org. Phyllodromica maculosa)
- Planuncus (Margundatus) paludicolus (Bohn, 1992) (org. Phyllodromica paludicola)
- Planuncus (Margundatus) princisi (Fernandes, 1962) (org. Phyllodromica princisi)
- Planuncus (Margundatus) striolatus (Bohn, 1992) (org. Phyllodromica striolata)

=== Subgenus Margintorus ===
This, at its inception, monotypic subgenus accommodates the single species previously known as Ectobius nicaeensis:

- **Planuncus (Margintorus) nicaeensis (Brisout de Barneville, 1852)** (org. Blatta nicaeensis)
