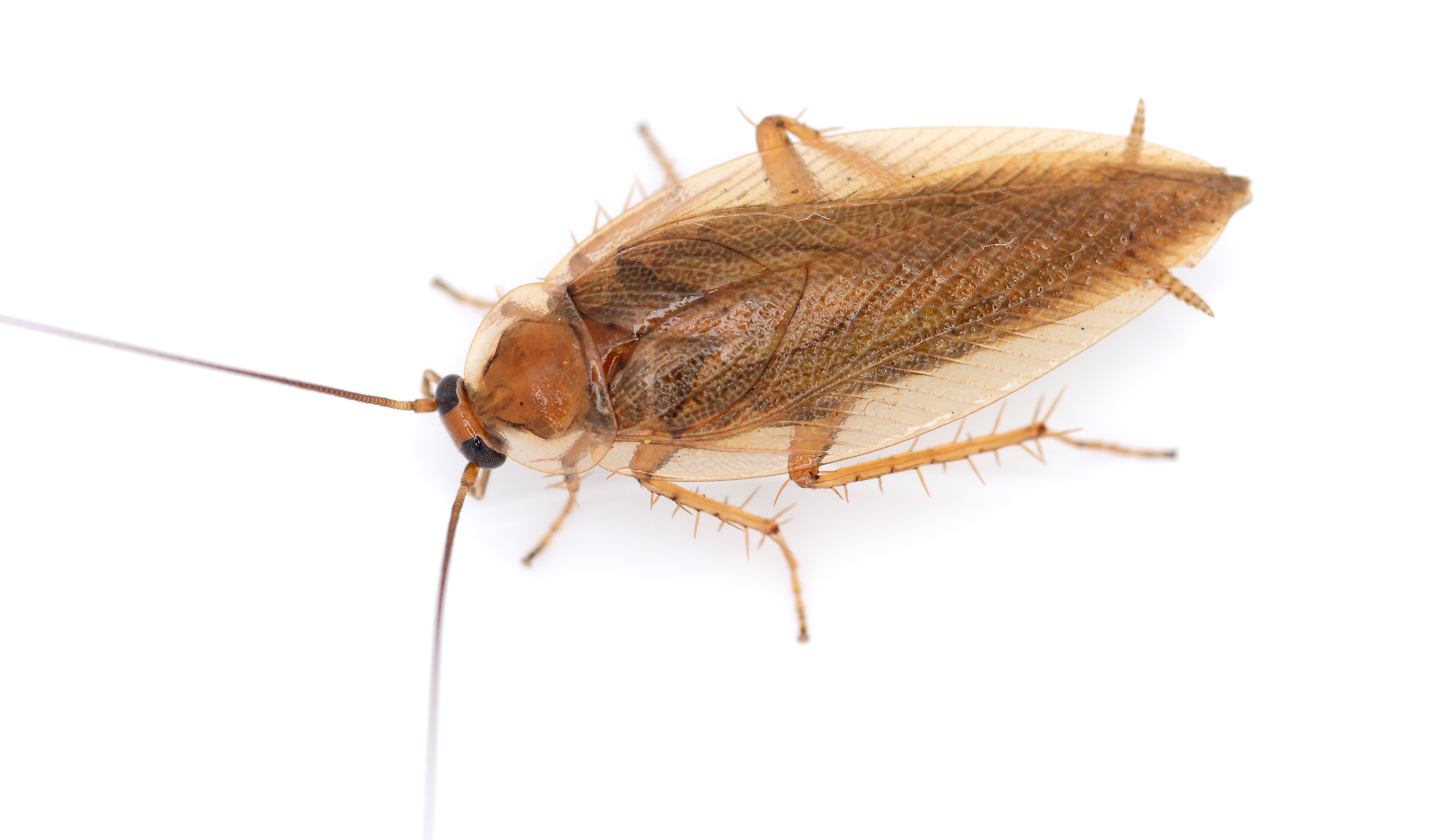

Scientific classification
- Kingdom: Animalia
- Phylum: Arthropoda
- Clade: Pancrustacea
- Class: Insecta
- Order: Blattodea
- Family: Ectobiidae
- Genus: Ectobius
- Species: E. vittiventris

Binomial name
- Ectobius vittiventris (Costa, 1847)

= Ectobius vittiventris =

Species of cockroach

Ectobius vittiventris, the amber wood cockroach, amber forest cockroach or garden cockroach, is a species belonging to the order Blattodea and is a type of wood cockroach originally from southern Europe. It is completely harmless to humans and is not a storage pest, as it only feeds on decomposing plant material and perishes within a few days in human dwellings due to a lack of food. Its original range was south of the Alps, but is now permanently established north of the Alps and in southern Germany.

Since the amber forest cockroach is capable of flight, it accidentally finds its way into human dwellings, especially in areas close to its natural habitat. It is attracted by artificial light sources.

== Features ==
The amber forest cockroach is a slender cockroach. The light brown body of the adult animal measuring between 9 and 14 mm long, the antennae are about twice as long as the body. The legs are noticeably spiny. The pronotum has a uniform light brown color and is translucent at the edge. In both sexes, the wings protrude above the tip of the abdomen, they are sometimes finely dotted.

Normally the species can be distinguished from similar species in Central Europe by the uniformly pale, translucent pronotum. In case of doubt, further characteristics are to be used for a reliable determination. Their affiliation to the genus Ectobius can be seen in the spines on the underside of the middle and rear thighs of the legs; these do not have rows of spines, but only one or two spines. The shape of the stylus (an attachment at the tip of the abdomen) and the shape of a glandular field on the upper side of the abdomen in the male are to be used for a reliable identification of the species. The ootheca of the female is 2.9 to 4.9 millimeters long and slightly curved lengthways. The dividing lines of the egg chambers shine through as fine transverse lines. The surface is sculptured with fine longitudinal ribs.

The underside of the females' abdomen is predominantly yellowish in color, with narrow dark transverse bands that widen towards the center. The glandular pits of the males are very large, taking up more than a third of the segment width of the 8th tergite, and are oval-shaped and trough-like in depth. It has long hairs on the front and back wall. The styli at the end of the abdomen are large.

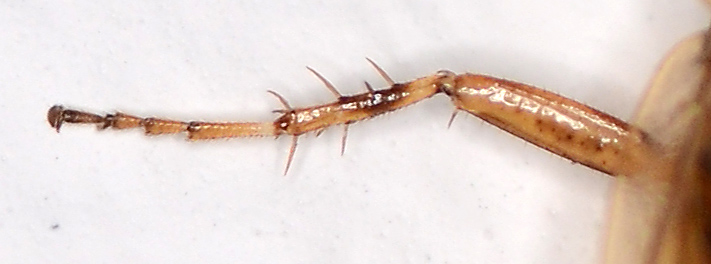
A leg of the amber wood cockroach

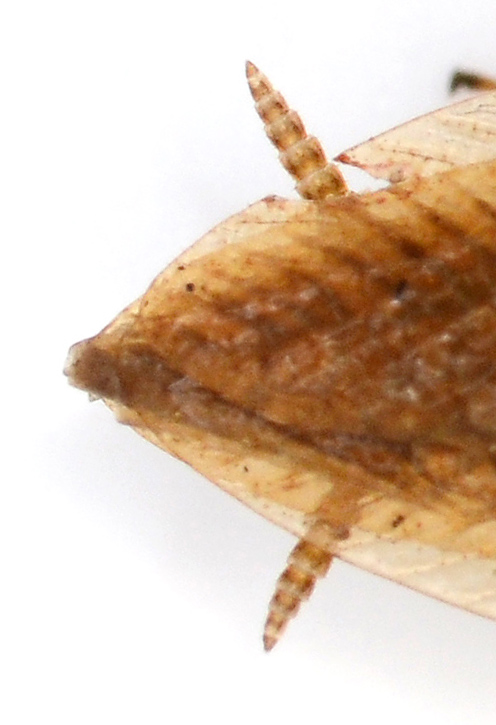
The cerci at the end of the abdomen

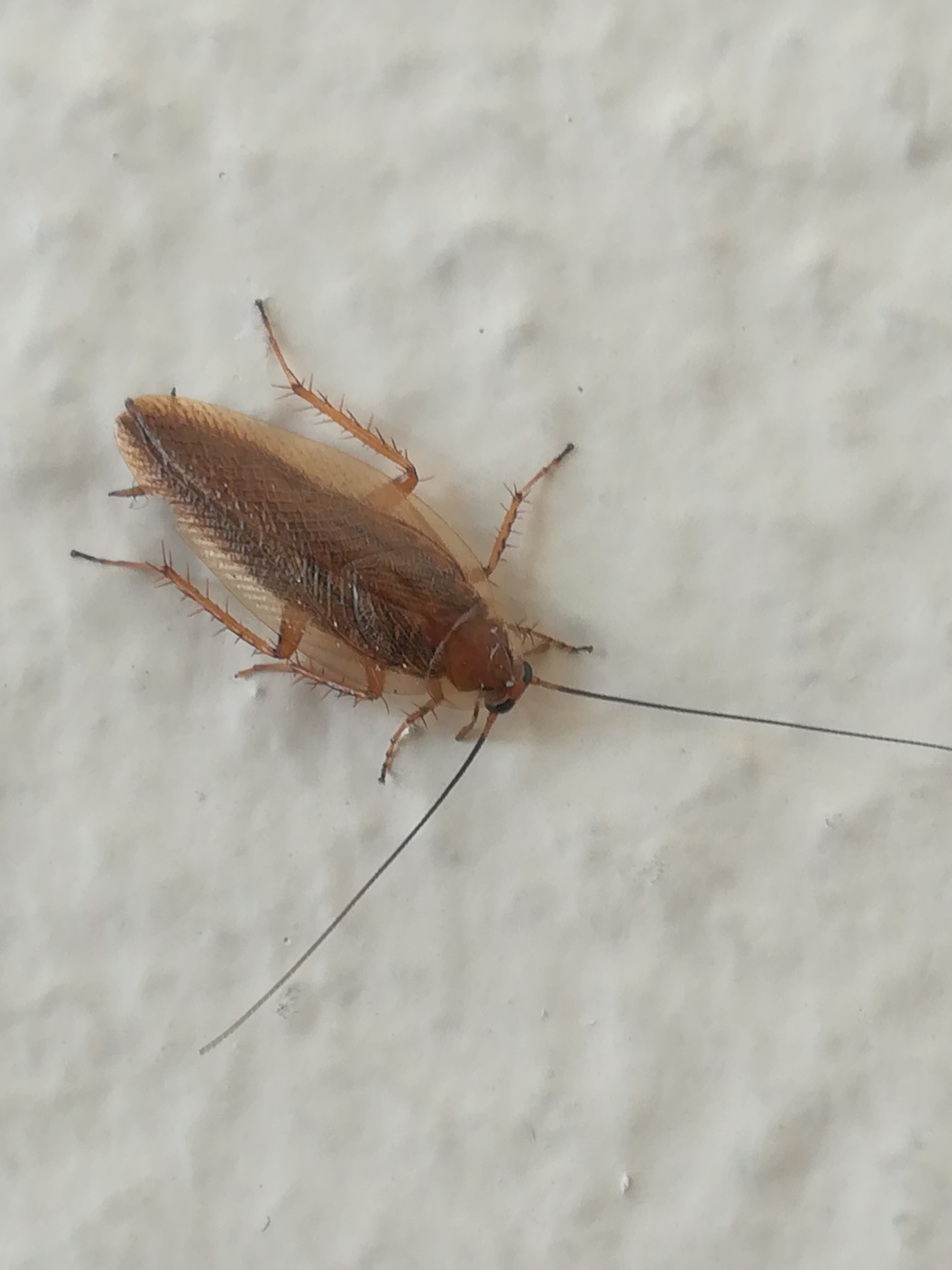
A male

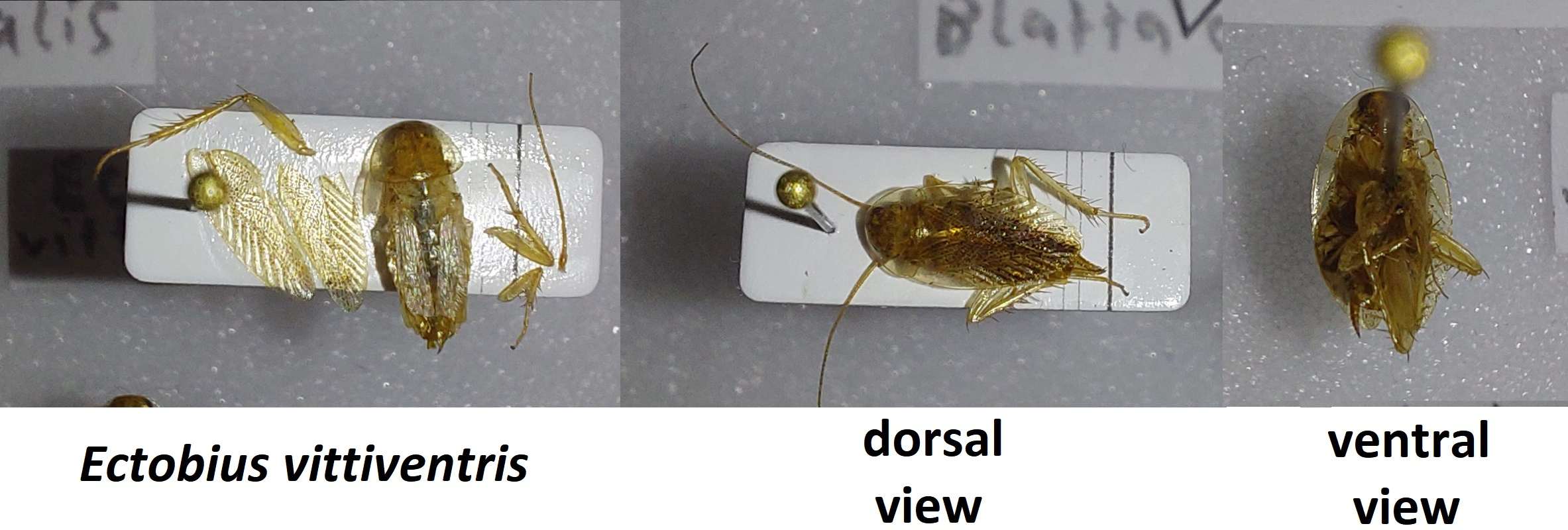
3 prepared specimens, the right image shows the underside of an amber wood cockroach

== Habitat ==
The natural habitat of the amber forest cockroach is outdoors in low bushes and gardens, often under pots. It feeds on decomposing plant material. Warm, dry summers can encourage mass reproduction. Then, there is a good chance that some make their way into homes.

== Spread ==
The amber wood cockroach is naturally widespread in southern Europe (Mediterranean region), to south of the Alps. Since around 1999 the species has spread northwards. The first finds came from northern Switzerland (e.g. Zurich, Winterthur). It has been present in Germany (Baden-Württemberg) since 2002. In 2006 they were confirmed to have reached Thuringia, in 2011 the first record was made for Bavaria and Rhineland-Palatinate. Since 2015 it has been present in North Rhine-Westphalia. Since 2018, it has been observed increasingly in Viennese gardens and garden apartments.

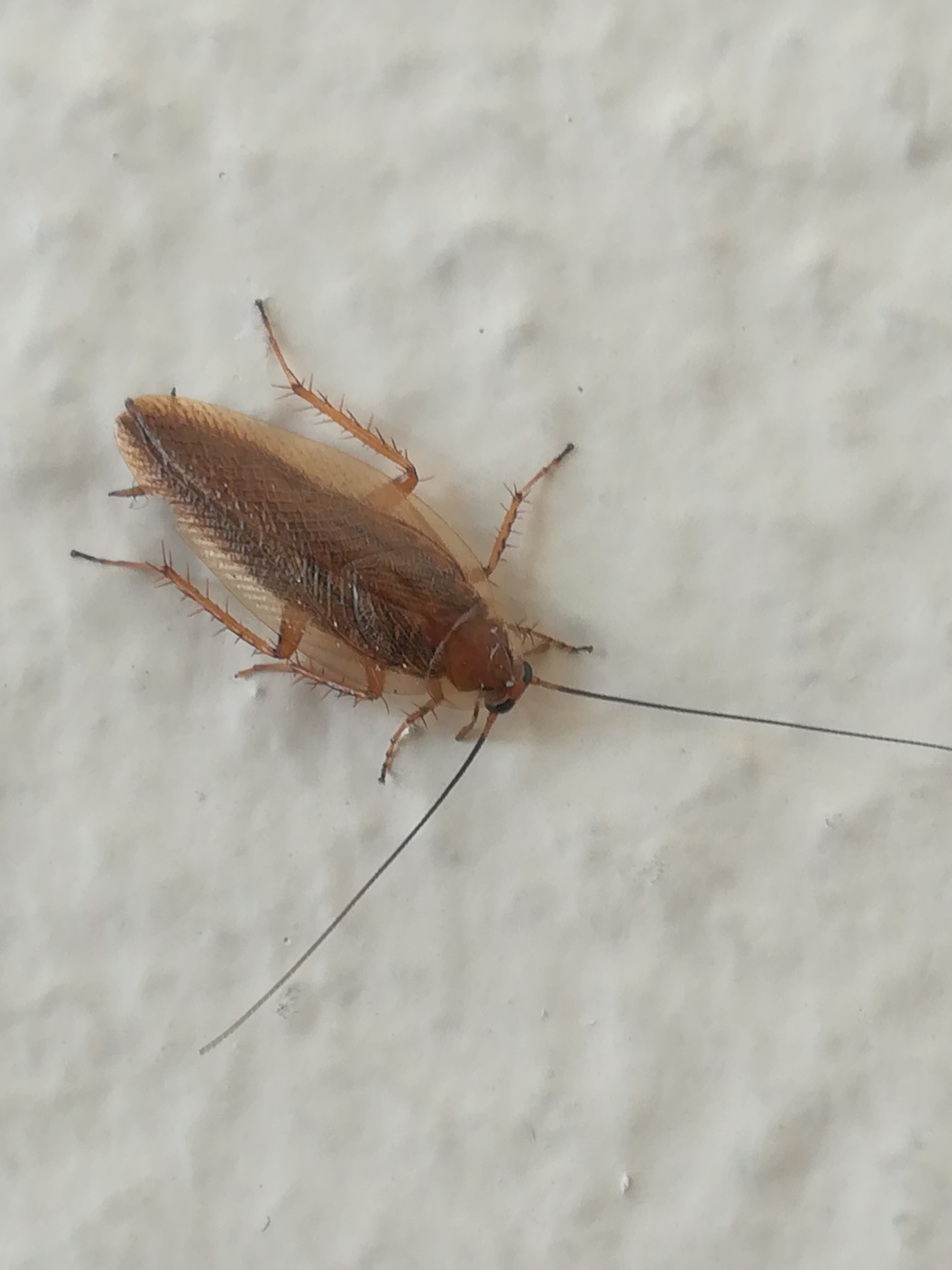
Occurrence of Ectobius vittiventris in Southern Germany, near Karlsruhe

== Similar species ==
The amber wood cockroach is often confused with other species in Central Europe. The most similar species are:

- Planuncus tingitanus s.l.
- Ectobius pallidus
- German cockroach (Blattella germanica)

Planuncus tingitanus s.l.

Both are species that migrated from Southern Europe to Central Europe in the 21st century. In the case of Planuncus tingitanus s.l., the wings of the adults do not or barely reach the end of the abdomen, while they clearly extend beyond the abdomen in the amber wood cockroach. Also, Planuncus has a whitish stripe between the eyes on the forehead which the amber wood cockroach lacks. Additionally the nymphs of Planuncus are black with a white transverse stripe, while in the amber wood cockroach they resemble the imago. Therefore, the two species can be most easily distinguished by the nymphs. In terms of color, shape, and size, they are otherwise very similar; however, the abdomen of Planuncus is dark and of E. vittiventris is lighter. It is usually covered by the wings and difficult to recognize. The spines on the underside of the middle and hind legs also provide a reliable distinguishing feature (see above).

Ectobius pallidus

Ectobius pallidus also looks very similar to the amber wood cockroach. The color, shape, and size are almost identical. E. pallidus is also spreading strongly to the east and can now be found even in the eastern half of Germany.

In females, differentiation is possible based on the ootheca. This is smooth in E. pallidus but has over 30 fine longitudinal ridges in the amber wood cockroach. The females sometimes have larger dark spots on the tegmina in E. pallidus which are missing in the amber wood cockroach. In males, the gland pit on the 8th tergite provides a reliable distinguishing feature. In the amber wood cockroach, this is oval-shaped and very large, taking up more than a third of the segment width. In E. pallidus, it is round to oval-shaped and small, taking up less than a third of the segment width.

German cockroach

The species can be easily distinguished by the dark longitudinal stripes that only occur in the German cockroach.

In size, shape, and color, the amber wood cockroach is very similar to the german cockroach (Blattella germanica), which is regarded as a hygiene pest. The most noticeable difference is the uniformly brown pronotum in the amber wood cockroach, while the German cockroach has two dark longitudinal stripes. While the German cockroach is usually active only at night, hiding during the day and fleeing from light, the amber wood cockroach is diurnal. The adults of the amber wood cockroach can fly relatively well, while adults of the German cockroach cannot fly.

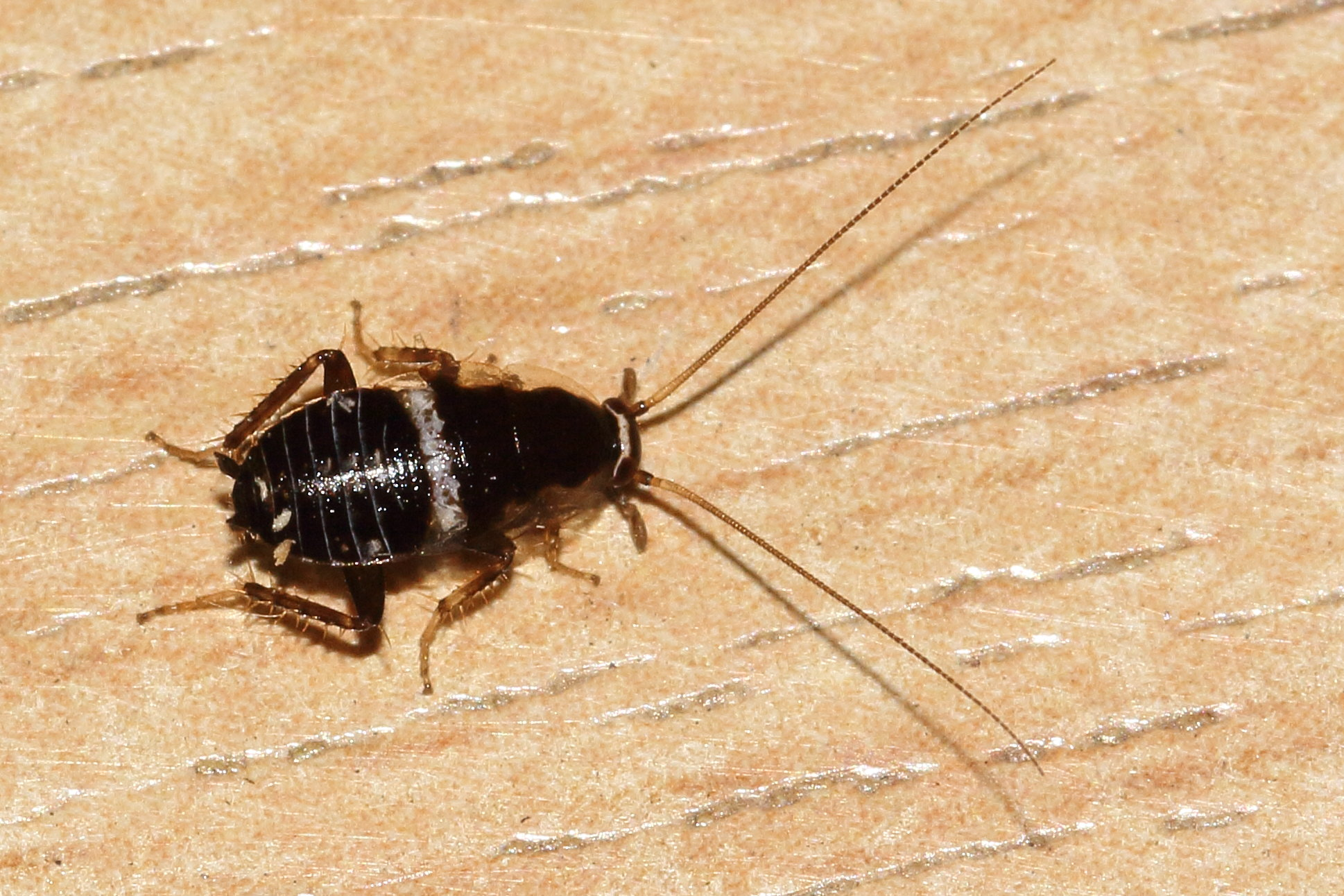
A nymph of Planuncus tingitanus

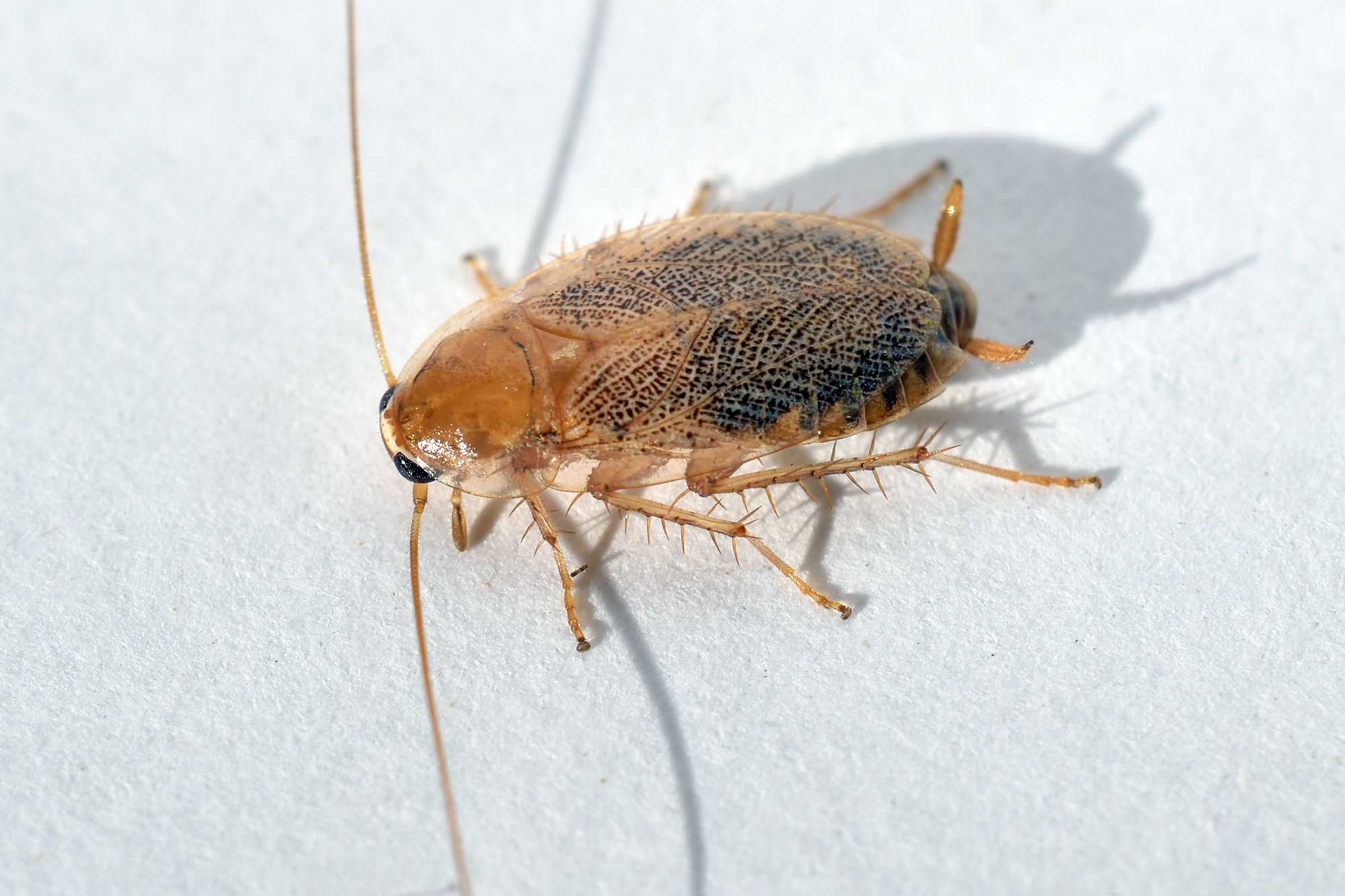
A typical specimen of Planuncus tingitanus with short wings, a dark abdomen, and the white stripe on the forehead

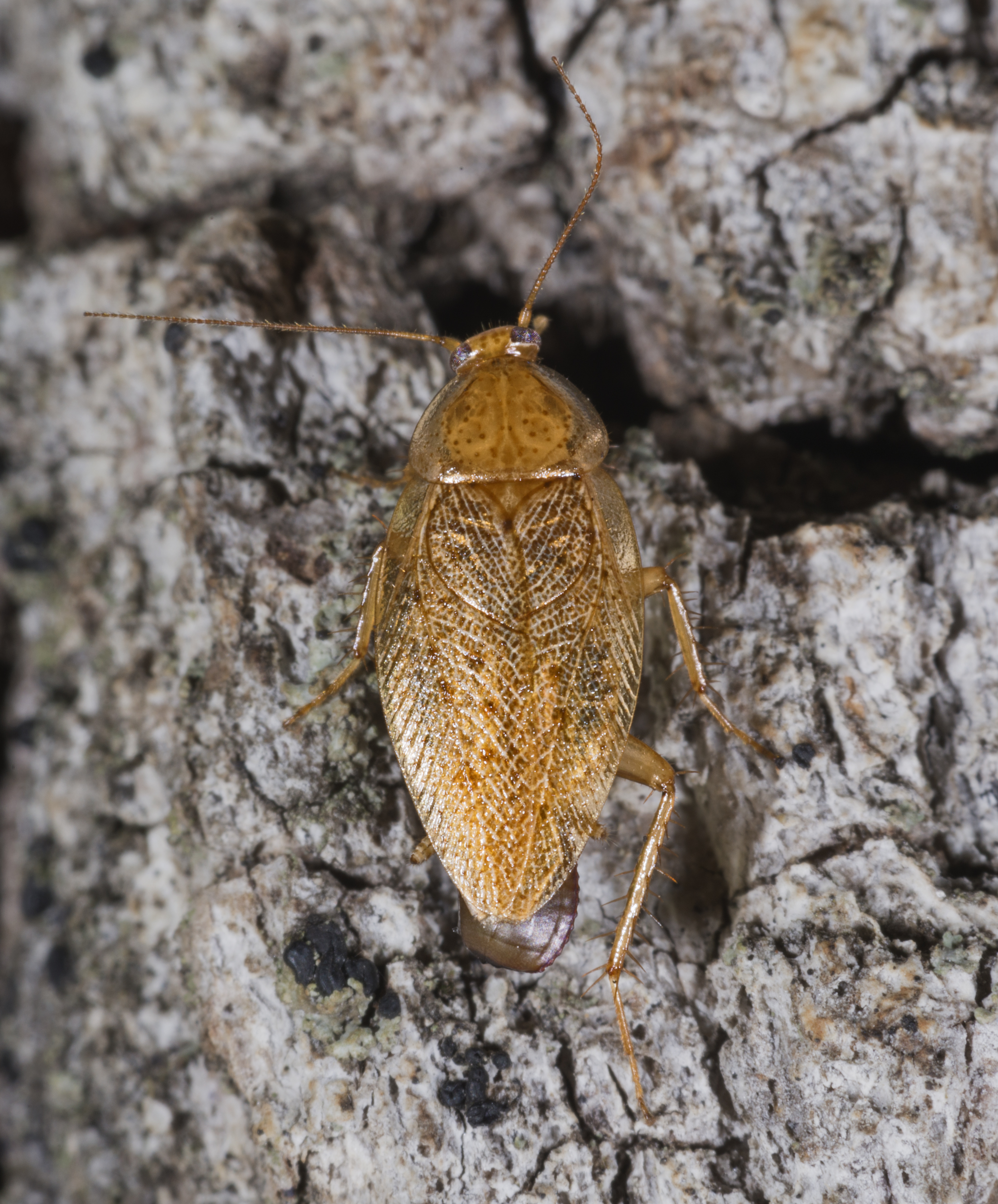
The very similar Ectobius pallidus

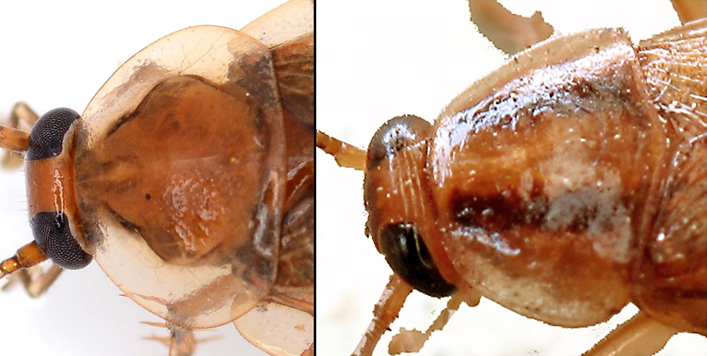
Pronota (shields behind the head) of the amber wood cockroach (left) and the German cockroach (right, with two dark longitudinal stripes) compared

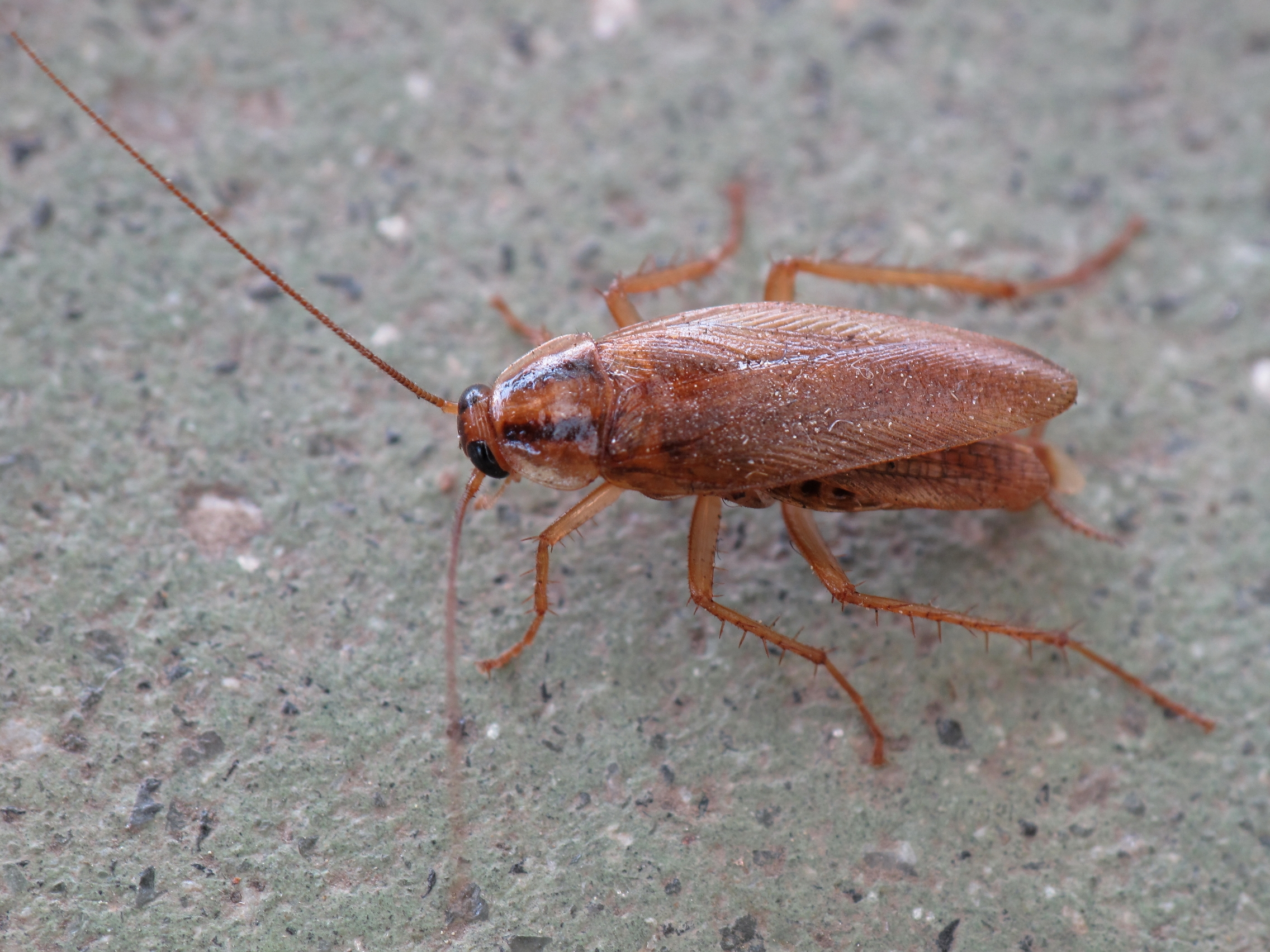
Complete view of a German cockroach
