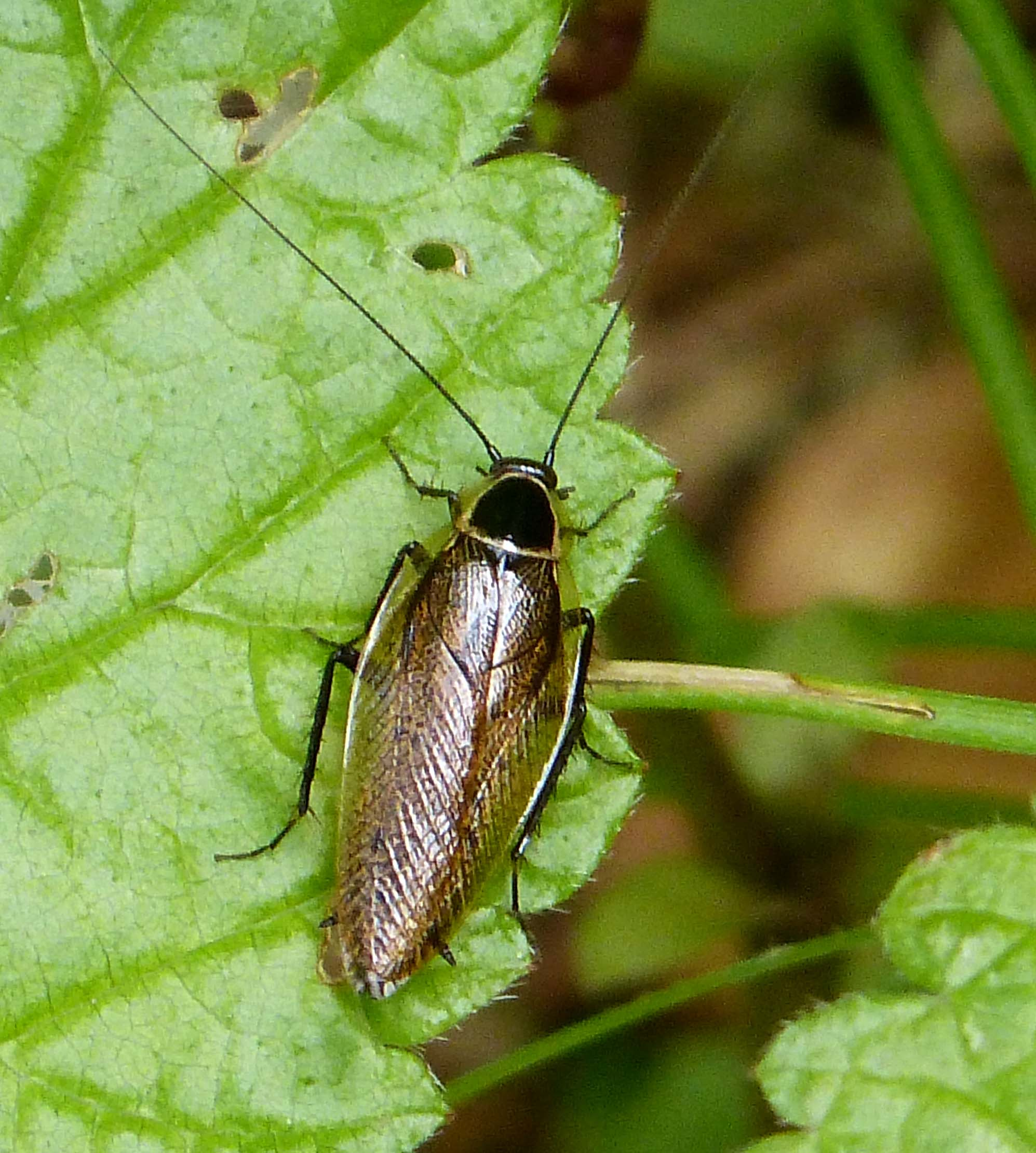

Scientific classification
- Kingdom: Animalia
- Phylum: Arthropoda
- Clade: Pancrustacea
- Class: Insecta
- Order: Blattodea
- Family: Ectobiidae
- Genus: Ectobius
- Species: E. sylvestris

Binomial name
- Ectobius sylvestris (Poda, 1761)

= Ectobius sylvestris =

Species of cockroach

Ectobius sylvestris, known generally as the forest cockroach or lesser cockroach, is a species of cockroach in the family Ectobiidae. It is found in Europe and Northern Asia (excluding China), North America, and temperate Asia.

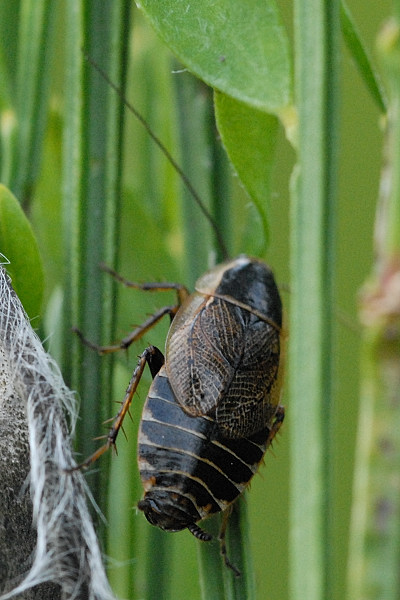
Forest cockroach, Ectobius sylvestris

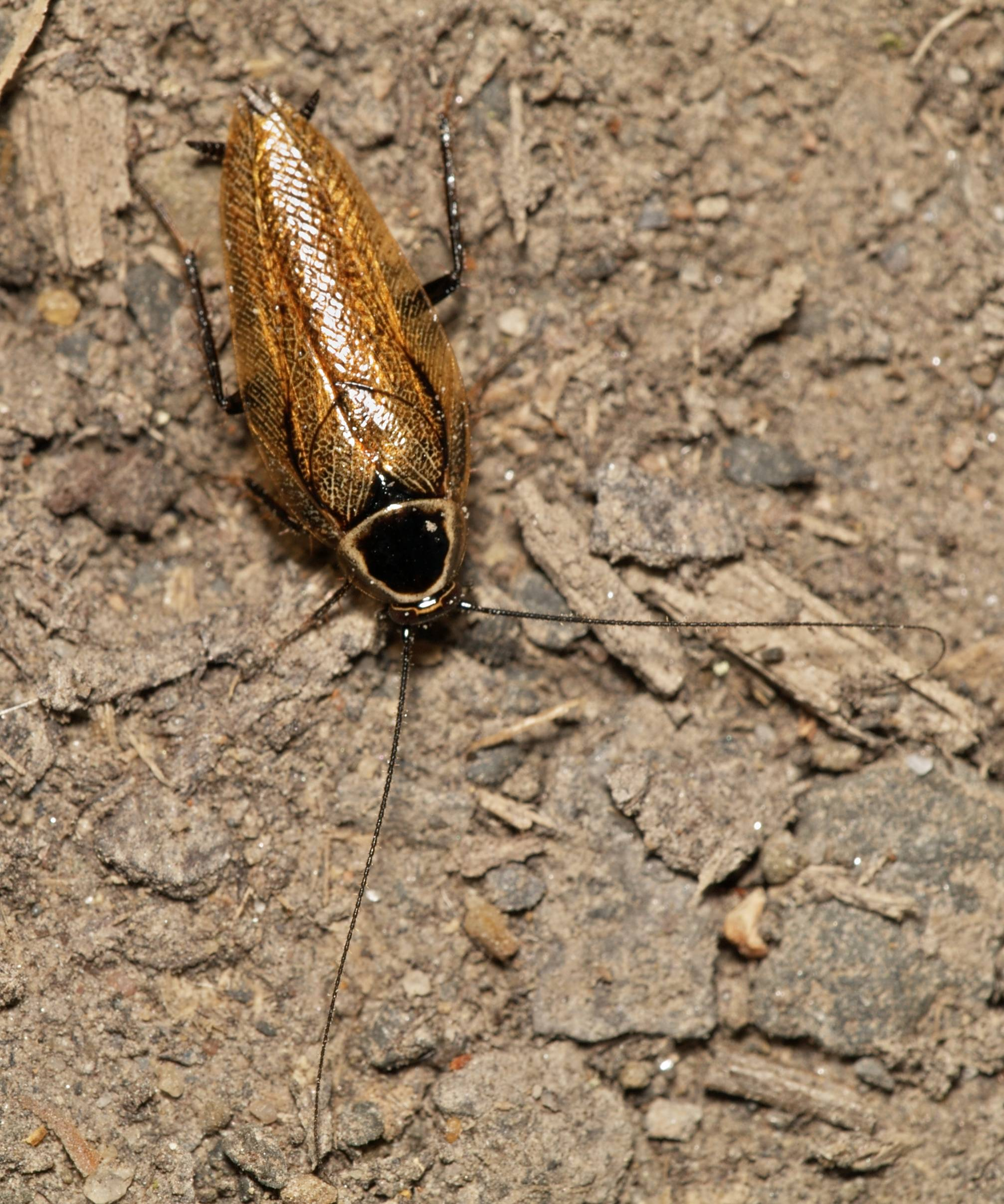
Forest cockroach, Ectobius sylvestris

== Subspecies ==
These two subspecies belong to the species Ectobius sylvestris:

- Ectobius sylvestris discrepans Adelung, 1917
- Ectobius sylvestris sylvestris (Poda, 1761)
