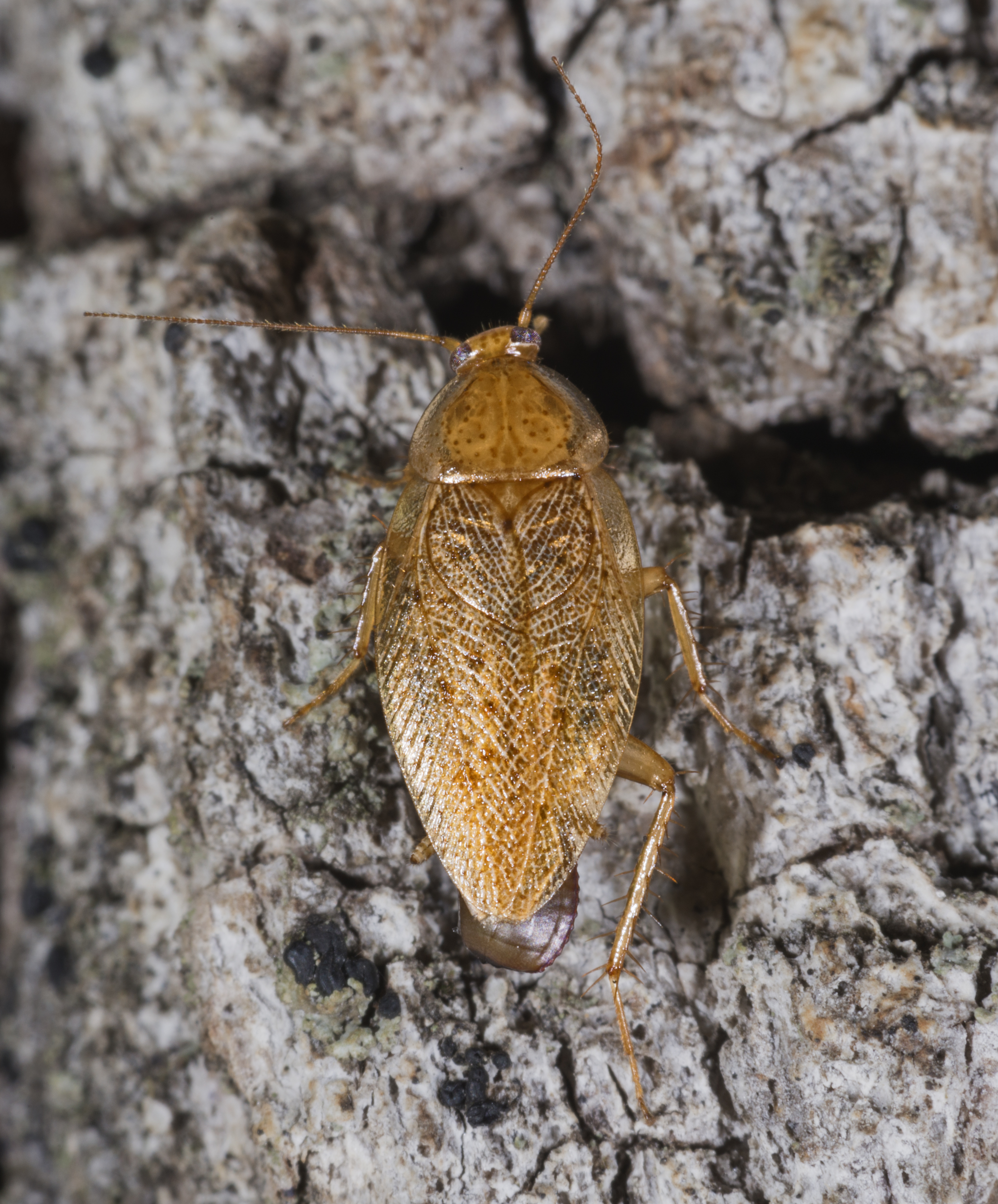

Scientific classification
- Kingdom: Animalia
- Phylum: Arthropoda
- Clade: Pancrustacea
- Class: Insecta
- Order: Blattodea
- Family: Ectobiidae
- Genus: Ectobius
- Species: E. pallidus

Binomial name
- Ectobius pallidus (Olivier, 1789)

Synonyms
- Blatta pallidus (Olivier, 1789) – basionym; Blatta livens (Turton, 1806); Blatta succinea (Risso, 1826)

= Ectobius pallidus =

Species of cockroach

Ectobius pallidus, the tawny cockroach, is a species of non-cosmopolitan cockroach in the family Ectobiidae. It occurs in southern England, Belgium, France, the Netherlands, Germany, Switzerland, Italy, Spain and Portugal; in North Africa: Algeria and Tunisia. It is now known to be introduced into North America.

== Subspecies ==
Subspecies include:

- Ectobius pallidus chopardi Adelung, 1917
- Ectobius pallidus minor Ramme, 1923
- Ectobius pallidus pallidus (Turton, 1806) – type
- Ectobius pallidus punctulatus (Fieber, 1853)

== See also ==
- Media related to Ectobius pallidus at Wikimedia Commons
- List of Orthoptera and allied insects of Great Britain
