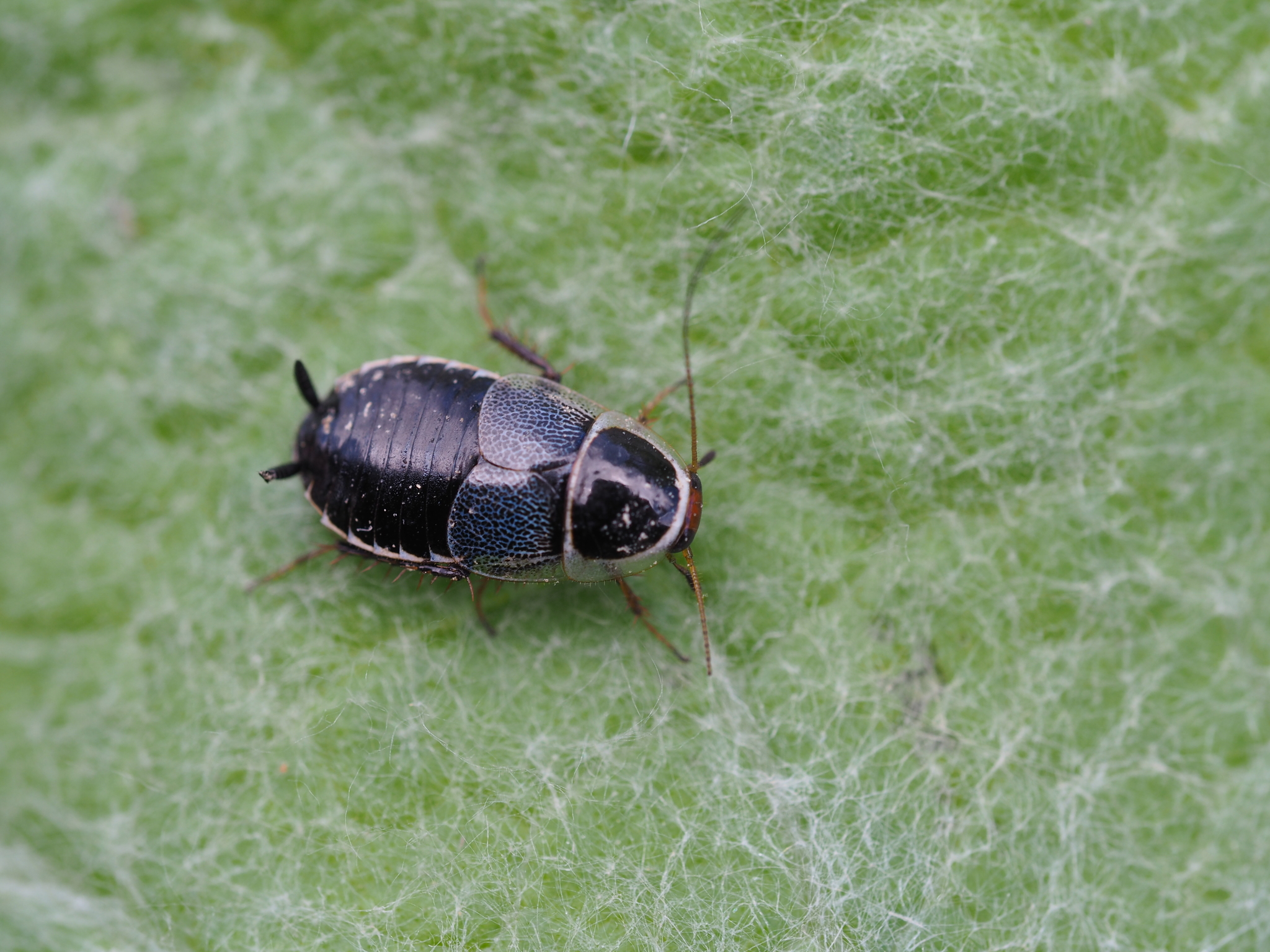
- Phyllodromica megerlei

Scientific classification
- Kingdom: Animalia
- Phylum: Arthropoda
- Clade: Pancrustacea
- Class: Insecta
- Order: Blattodea
- Family: Ectobiidae
- Subfamily: Ectobiinae
- Genus: Phyllodromica; Fieber, 1853

Synonyms
- Aphlebia Brunner von Wattenwyl, 1865; Hololampra Saussure, 1864

= Phyllodromica =

Genus of cockroaches

External image
- Images at iNaturalist

Phyllodromica is a genus of mostly Palaearctic cockroaches in the subfamily Ectobiinae, erected by Franz Xaver Fieber in 1853. The recorded distribution (probably incomplete) for species includes: mainland Europe (cosmopolitan in the British Isles, Iceland and Scandinavia), North Africa, the Middle East through to central Asia.

== Species ==
The Cockroach Species File lists:

subgenus Lobolampra Houlbert, 1927

1. Phyllodromica adelungi Chopard, 1943
2. Phyllodromica carpetana (Bolívar, 1873)
3. Phyllodromica cazurroi (Bolívar, 1885)
4. Phyllodromica iberica Knebelsberger & Miller, 2007
5. Phyllodromica janeri (Bolívar, 1894)
6. Phyllodromica opaca (Chopard, 1936)
7. Phyllodromica panteli (Bolívar, 1921)
8. Phyllodromica persa Bey-Bienko, 1935
9. Phyllodromica pygmaea (Bey-Bienko, 1932)
10. Phyllodromica quadracantha Knebelsberger & Miller, 2007
11. Phyllodromica riparia Bey-Bienko, 1950
12. Phyllodromica subaptera (Rambur, 1838)
13. Phyllodromica tartara (Saussure, 1874)
14. Phyllodromica theryi (Chopard, 1936)
15. Phyllodromica vicina (Chopard, 1936)
16. Phyllodromica virgulata (Bolívar, 1878)

subgenus Phyllodromica Fieber, 1853

1. Phyllodromica acarinata Bohn, 1999
2. Phyllodromica acuminata Bohn, 1999
3. Phyllodromica adspersa (Bolívar, 1897)
4. Phyllodromica adusta (Fischer, 1846)
5. Phyllodromica amedegnatoi Failla & Messina, 1989
6. Phyllodromica andorrana Failla & Messina, 1992
7. Phyllodromica asiatica Bey-Bienko, 1950
8. Phyllodromica atlantica Bohn, 1999
9. Phyllodromica barbata Bohn, 1999
10. Phyllodromica bicolor (Chopard, 1936)
11. Phyllodromica bolivariana Bohn, 1999
12. Phyllodromica brevipennis (Fischer, 1853)
13. Phyllodromica brevisacculata Bohn, 1999
14. Phyllodromica carniolica (Ramme, 1913)
15. Phyllodromica chladeki Harz, 1977
16. Phyllodromica chopardi Fernandes, 1962
17. Phyllodromica cincticollis (Lucas, 1849)
18. Phyllodromica clavisacculata Bohn, 1999
19. Phyllodromica coniformis Bohn, 1993
20. Phyllodromica crassirostris Bohn, 1999
21. Phyllodromica cretensis (Ramme, 1927)
22. Phyllodromica curtipennis (Chopard, 1943)
23. Phyllodromica delospuertos Bohn, 1999
24. Phyllodromica donskoffi Failla & Messina, 1989
25. Phyllodromica euxina Bey-Bienko, 1950
26. Phyllodromica fernandesiana Bohn, 1999
27. Phyllodromica globososacculata Bohn, 1999
28. Phyllodromica graeca (Brunner von Wattenwyl, 1882)
29. Phyllodromica halterisignata Bohn, 2011
30. Phyllodromica harzi Chládek, 1977
31. Phyllodromica hungarica Vidlička, 1993
32. Phyllodromica integra (Chopard, 1936)
33. Phyllodromica isolata Bohn, 1999
34. Phyllodromica javalambrensis Bohn, 1999
35. Phyllodromica kiritshenkoi Bey-Bienko, 1948
36. Phyllodromica laticarinata Bohn, 1999
37. Phyllodromica latipennis Bohn & Chládek, 2011
38. Phyllodromica lativittata Bohn, 1999
39. Phyllodromica llorenteae Harz, 1971
40. Phyllodromica maculata (Schreber, 1781)
41. Phyllodromica maghrebina Failla & Messina, 1987
42. Phyllodromica marani Chládek & Harz, 1980
43. Phyllodromica marginata (Schreber, 1781)
44. Phyllodromica megerlei Fieber, 1853 - type species (as Blatta punctata Charpentier: by subsequent designation)
45. Phyllodromica montenegrina Ingrisch & Pavicevic, 2010
46. Phyllodromica moralesi Fernandes, 1962
47. Phyllodromica nadigi Harz, 1976
48. Phyllodromica nuragica Failla & Messina, 1982
49. Phyllodromica pallida (Brunner von Wattenwyl, 1882)
50. Phyllodromica pavani Failla & Messina, 1979
51. Phyllodromica polita (Krauss, 1888)
52. Phyllodromica porosa Bohn, 1999
53. Phyllodromica pulcherrima Vidlička & Majzlan, 1997
54. Phyllodromica quadrivittata Chopard, 1963
55. Phyllodromica retowskii (Krauss, 1888)
56. Phyllodromica rhomboidea Bohn, 1999
57. Phyllodromica sacarraoi Fernandes, 1967
58. Phyllodromica sardea (Serville, 1838)
59. Phyllodromica schelkovnikovi (Burr, 1913)
60. Phyllodromica septentrionalis Bohn, 1999
61. Phyllodromica sulcata Bohn, 1999
62. Phyllodromica tarbinskyi (Bey-Bienko, 1932)
63. Phyllodromica tenebricosa Bohn, 1999
64. Phyllodromica tenuirostris Bohn, 1999
65. Phyllodromica transylvanica Vidlička, 1994
66. Phyllodromica turanica (Bey-Bienko, 1932)
67. Phyllodromica tyrrhenica (Ramme, 1927)
68. Phyllodromica variabilis Bohn, 2011
69. Phyllodromica vignai (Failla & Messina, 1989)
70. Phyllodromica znojkoi Bey-Bienko, 1938

subgenus Turanoblatta Bey-Bienko, 1950

1. Phyllodromica irinae (Bey-Bienko, 1932)

subgenus not determined

1. Phyllodromica danflousi Maurel, 2011
