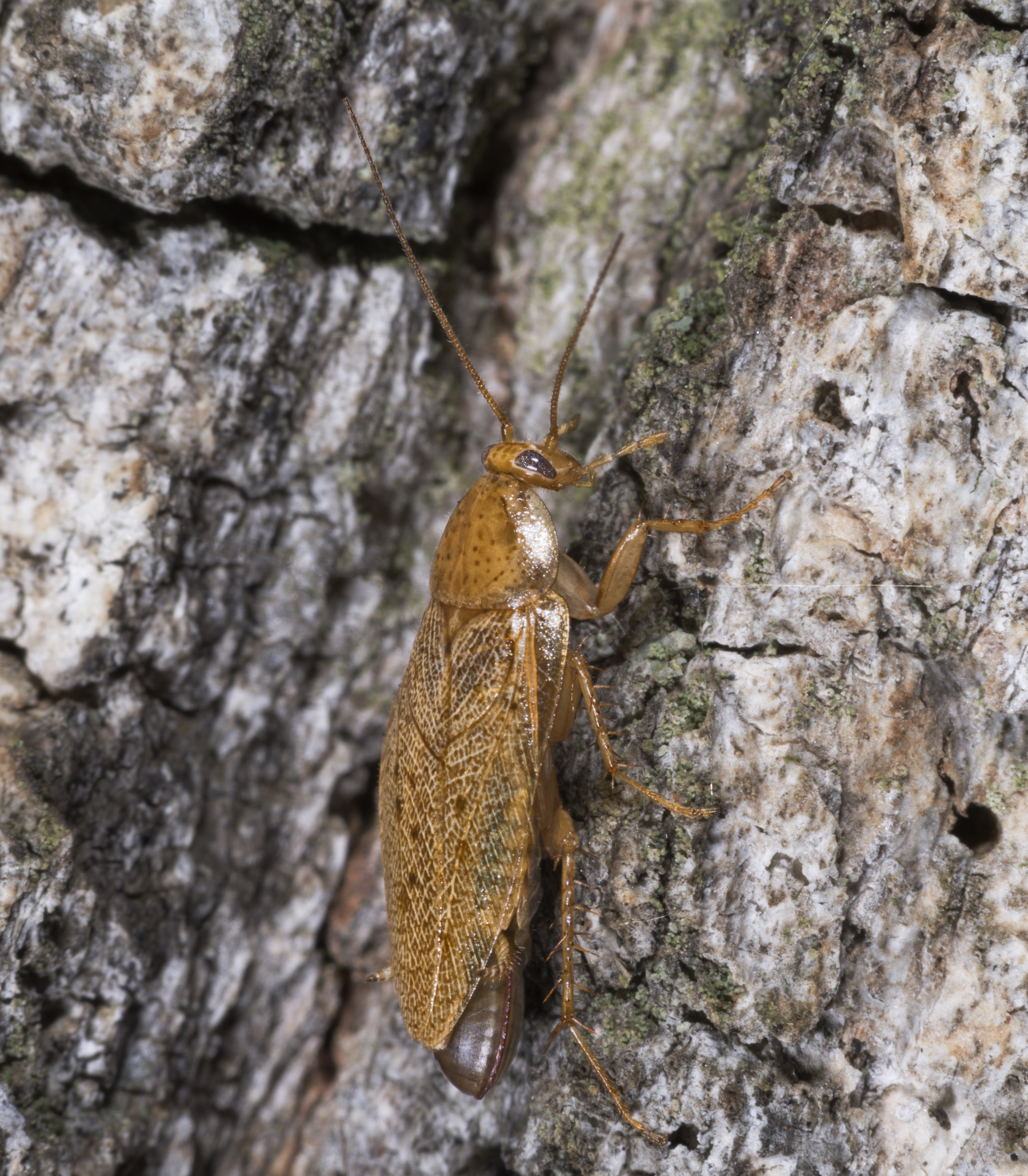
- Ectobius pallidus

Scientific classification
- Kingdom: Animalia
- Phylum: Arthropoda
- Clade: Pancrustacea
- Class: Insecta
- Order: Blattodea
- Family: Ectobiidae
- Subfamily: Ectobiinae
- Genus: Ectobius; Stephens, 1835

Species
- See article text

= Ectobius =

Genus of cockroaches

Ectobius is a genus of non-cosmopolitan cockroaches once thought native to the Old World and described by James Francis Stephens in 1835, belonging to the family Ectobiidae, subfamily Ectobiinae. The oldest known member of the genus, Ectobius antiquus, was described from the Upper Cretaceous strata of the Nenjiang Formation (China). The discovery of 4 Ectobius cockroaches in Colorado dating to 49 million years ago suggests that members of the genus were present in North America in the past before their reintroduction by humans. This genus has been subject to a number of revisions.

== Description ==
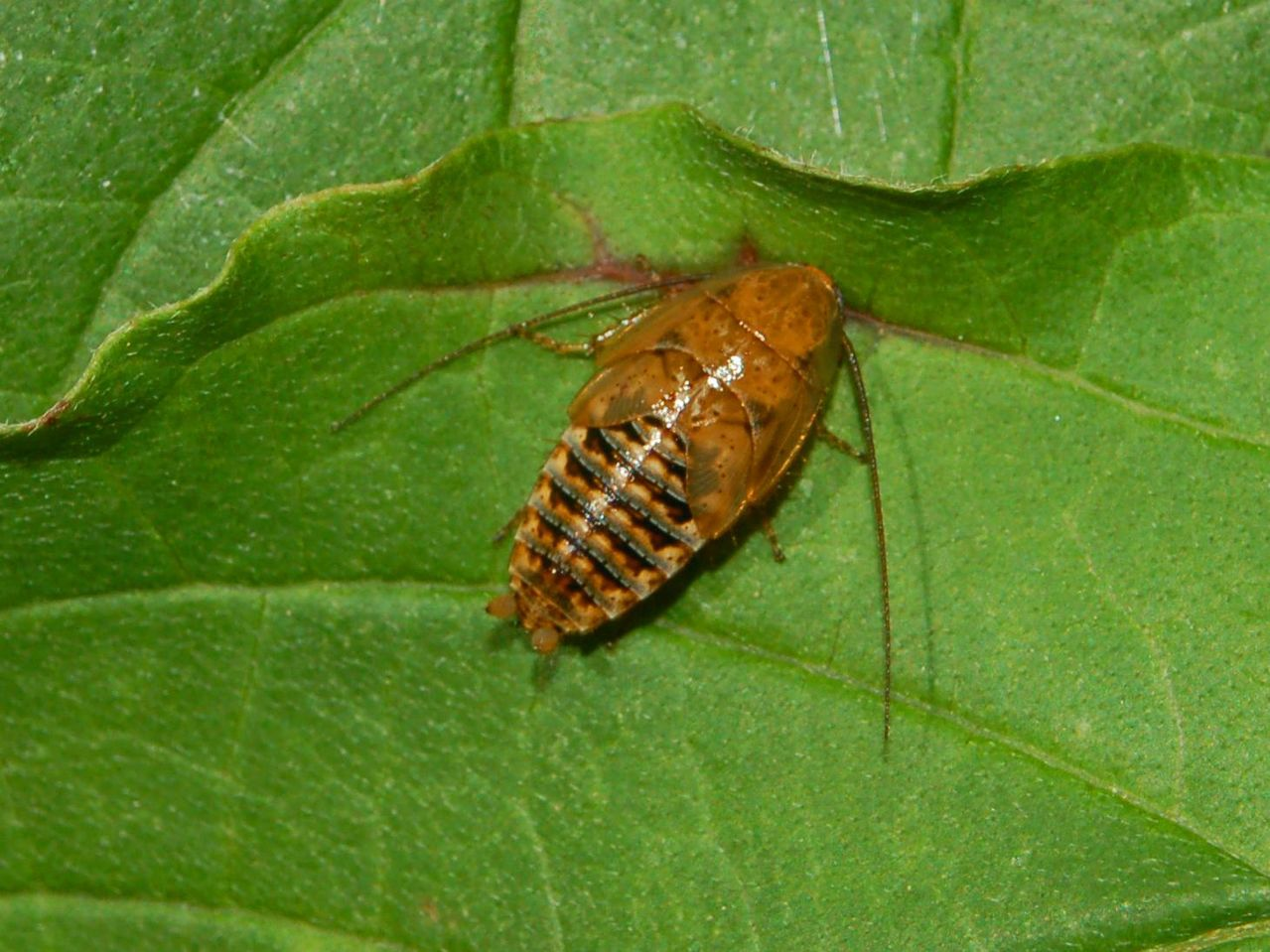
Ectobius species – Nymph

The adult 'cockroaches' reach 6–12 millimetres (0.24–0.47 in) of length, the basic coloration of their body is mostly brown or yellowish, with a clearer margin.

The females are usually bigger than the males and have shorter wings, while in the males wings cover at least the whole abdomen.

== Distribution ==
Species of this genus are mainly present in most of Europe, Africa, in eastern Palearctic realm and the Near East. The "lesser cockroach" (i.e. as found in Britain), previously placed here, is now in the genus Capraiellus.

The genus was long absent from the North American continent until recent re-introductions of some cool-adapted species in the Canadian Maritimes and North Eastern, US.

== Species ==
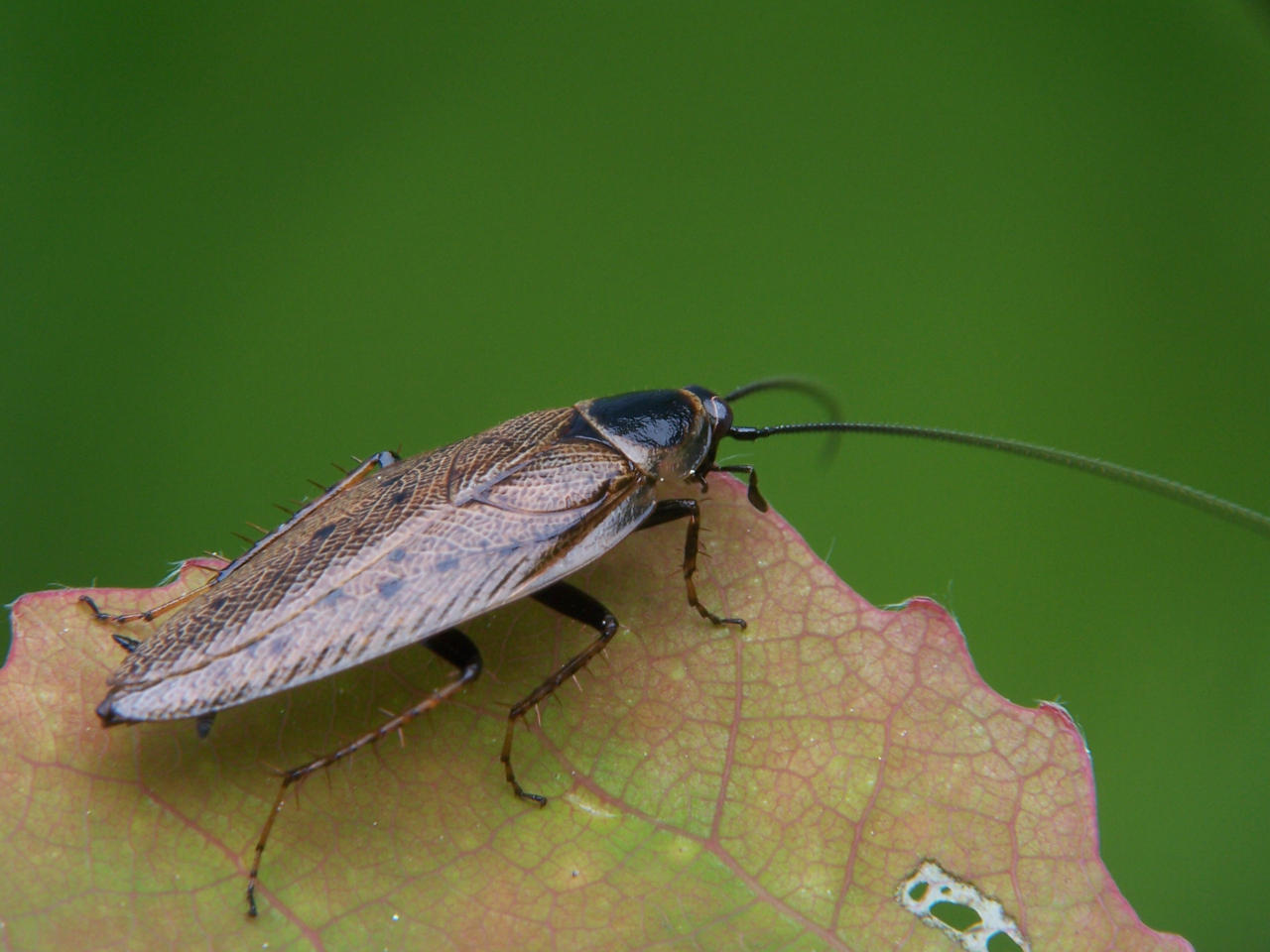
Ectobius lapponicus

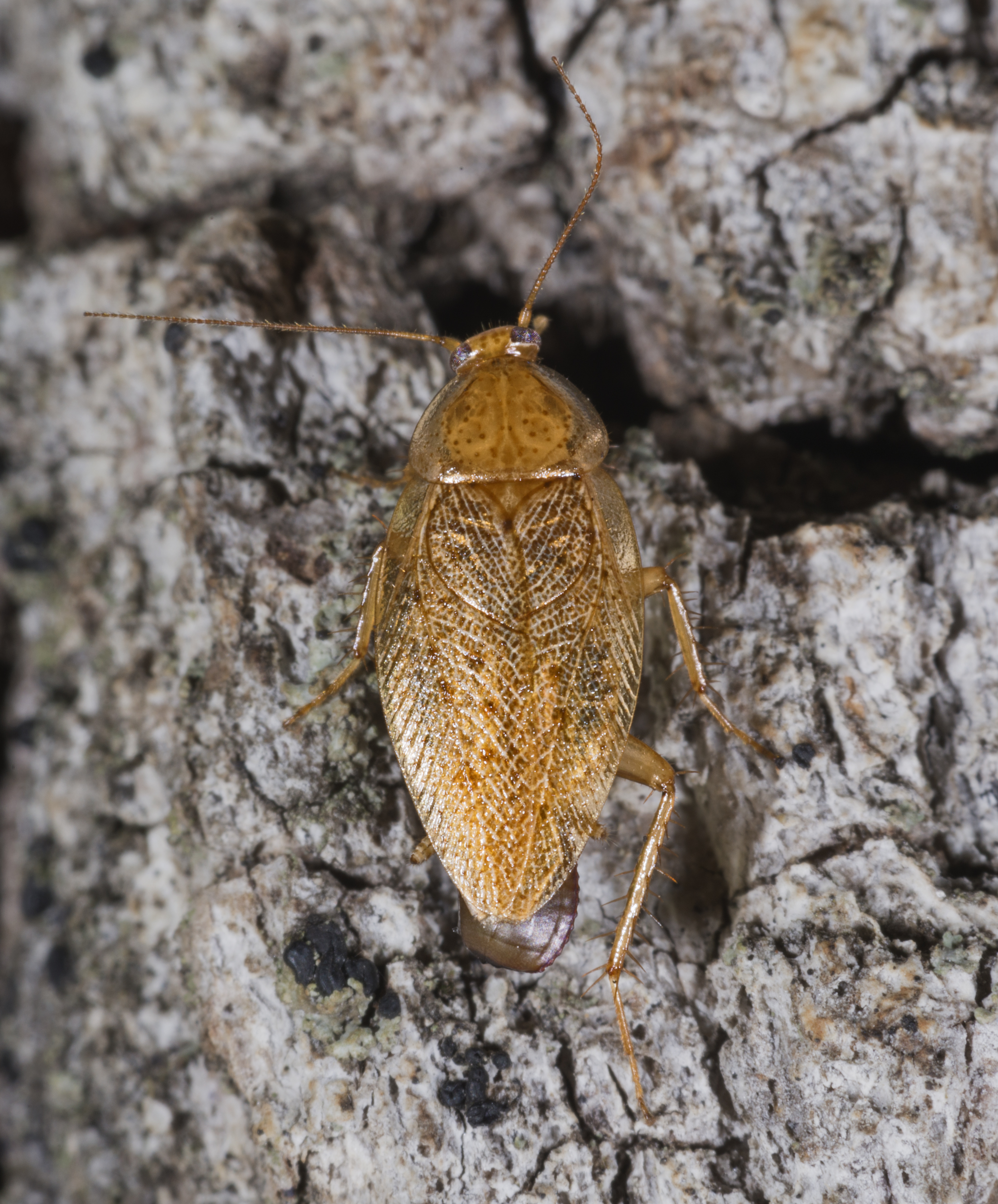
Ectobius pallidus

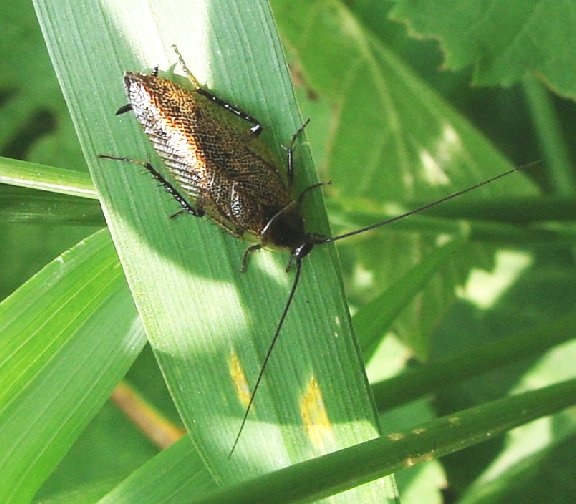
Ectobius sylvestris

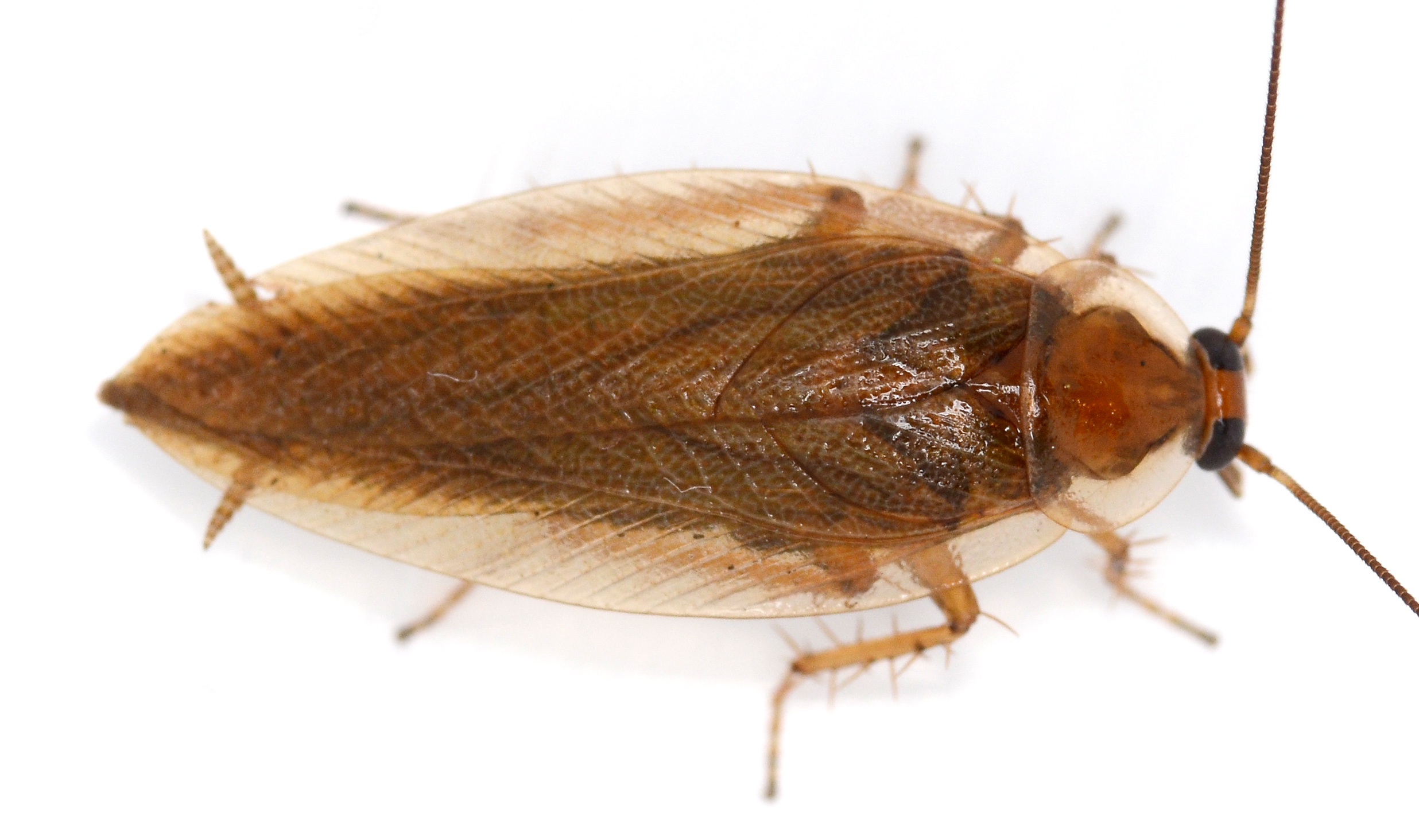
Ectobius vittiventris

The Cockroach Species File lists:

- Ectobius hipposiderus Bohn, 2013

subgenus Ectobiola Uvarov, 1940 (synonym Ectobiella Adelung, 1917)

- Ectobius duskei Adelung, 1906

subgenus Ectobius Stephens, 1835

- Ectobius aeoliensis Failla & Messina, 1974
- Ectobius aethiopicus (Shelford, 1910)
- Ectobius aetnaeus Ramme, 1927
- Ectobius africanus Saussure, 1899
- Ectobius albicinctus (Brunner von Wattenwyl, 1861)
- Ectobius alleni Rehn, 1931
- Ectobius baccettii Failla & Messina, 1979
- Ectobius balcani Ramme, 1923
- Ectobius brunneri Seoane, 1879
- Ectobius burri Adelung, 1917
- Ectobius corsorum Ramme, 1923
- Ectobius darbandae Rehn, 1931
- Ectobius delicatulus Bey-Bienko, 1950
- Ectobius eckerleini Harz, 1977
- Ectobius erythronotus Burr, 1898
- Ectobius filicensis Failla & Messina, 1974
- Ectobius frieseanus Princis, 1963
- Ectobius heteropterus Bey-Bienko, 1963
- Ectobius ichnusae Failla & Messina, 1982
- Ectobius indicus Bey-Bienko, 1938
- Ectobius intermedius Failla & Messina, 1981
- Ectobius involutus Rehn, 1931
- Ectobius jarringi (Hanitsch, 1937)
- Ectobius kervillei Bolívar, 1907
- Ectobius kikensis Rehn, 1931
- Ectobius kikuyuensis Rehn, 1931
- Ectobius kirgizius Bey-Bienko, 1936
- Ectobius kraussianus Ramme, 1923
- Ectobius lagrecai Failla & Messina, 1981
- Ectobius lapponicus (Linnaeus, 1758) - type species (as Blatta lapponica L. = Ectobius lapponicus lapponicus)
- Ectobius larus Rehn, 1931
- Ectobius leptus Rehn, 1931
- Ectobius lineolatus (Rehn, 1922)
- Ectobius lodosi Harz, 1983
- Ectobius lucidus (Hagenbach, 1822)
- Ectobius makalaka Rehn, 1931
- Ectobius minutus Failla & Messina, 1978
- Ectobius montanus Costa, 1866
- Ectobius neavei Shelford, 1911
- Ectobius nuba Rehn, 1931
- Ectobius pallidus (Olivier, 1789)
- Ectobius palpalis Chopard, 1958
- Ectobius parvosacculatus Failla & Messina, 1974
- Ectobius pavlovskii Bey-Bienko, 1936
- Ectobius punctatissimus Ramme, 1922
- Ectobius pusillus Bey-Bienko, 1967
- Ectobius pyrenaicus Bohn, 1989
- Ectobius rammei Rehn, 1926
- Ectobius sardous Baccetti, 1991
- Ectobius scabriculus Failla & Messina, 1976
- Ectobius semenovi Bey-Bienko, 1935
- Ectobius siculus Ramme, 1949
- Ectobius sjoestedti (Shelford, 1910)
- Ectobius stanleyanus Rehn, 1931
- Ectobius subvitreus Bey-Bienko, 1936
- Ectobius supramontes Bohn, 2004
- Ectobius sylvestris (Poda, 1761)
- Ectobius tadzhikus Bey-Bienko, 1935
- Ectobius textilis Rehn, 1931
- Ectobius ticinus Bohn, 2004
- Ectobius togoensis Ramme, 1923
- Ectobius tuscus Galvagni, 1978
- Ectobius tyrrhenicus Failla & Messina, 1973
- Ectobius usticaensis Failla & Messina, 1974
- Ectobius vittiventris (Costa, 1847)
- Ectobius willemsei Failla & Messina, 1980
