= Environmental issues in New York City =

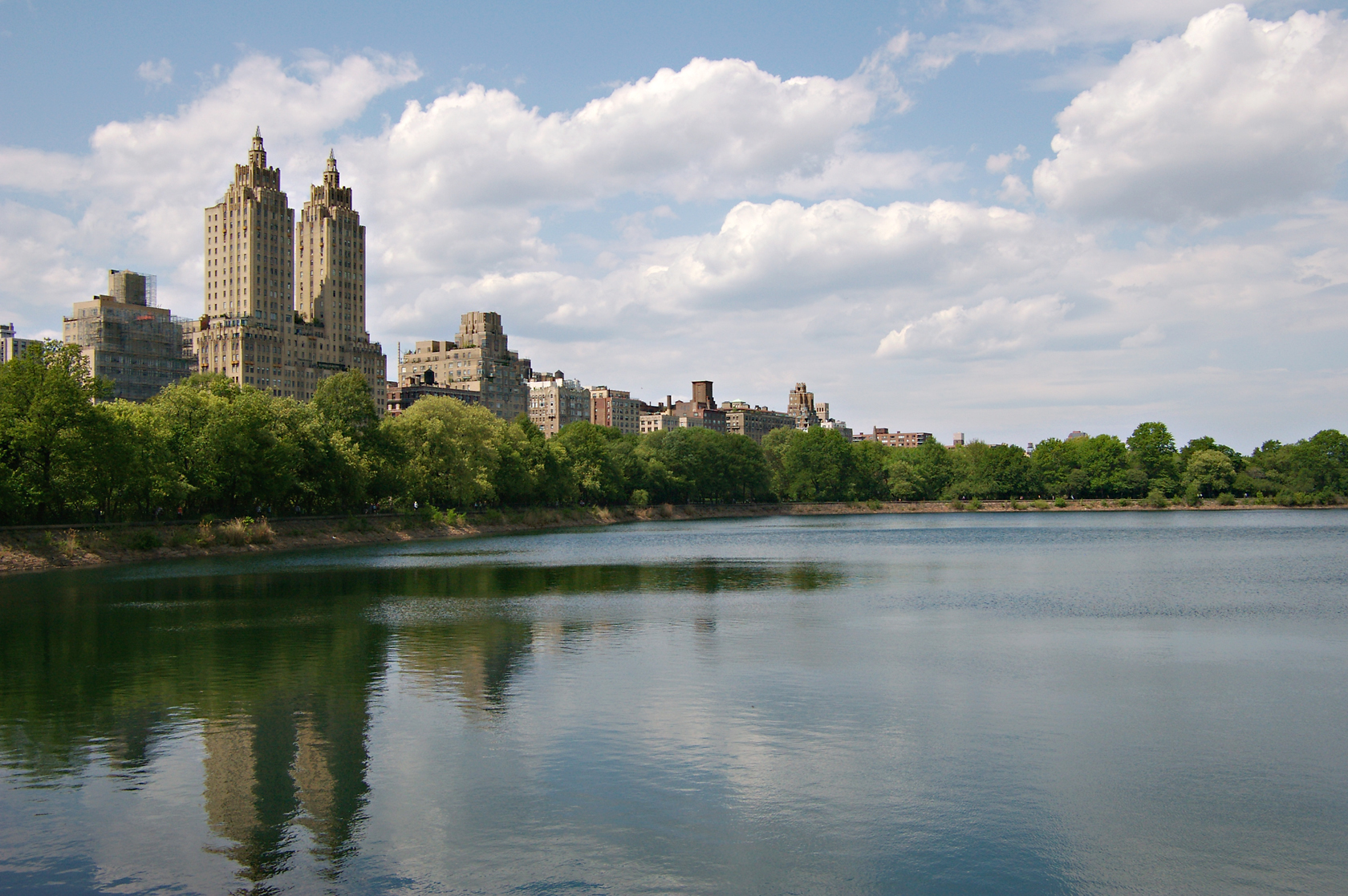
Central Park's reservoirs were historically important components of the New York City water supply system.

Environmental issues in New York City are affected by the city's size, density, abundant public transportation infrastructure, and location at the mouth of the Hudson River.

New York's population density has environmental pros and cons. It facilitates the highest mass transit use in the United States, but also concentrates pollution. Gasoline consumption in the city is at the rate the national average was in the 1920s, and greenhouse gas emissions are a fraction of the national average, at 7.1 metric tons per person per year, below San Francisco, at 11.2 metric tons, and the national average, at 24.5 metric tons. New York City accounts for only 1% of United States greenhouse gas emissions while housing 2.7% of its population. Governors Island in New York Harbor is planned to host a US$1 billion research and education center poised to make New York City the global leader in addressing the climate crisis.

== Population density ==
Environmental concerns in the city involve managing the city's extraordinary population density. Mass transit use is the highest in the nation and gasoline consumption in the city is at the rate the national average was in the 1920s. New York City's dense population and low automobile dependence help make New York among the most energy efficient in the United States. The city's greenhouse gas emission levels are relatively low when measured per capita, at 7.1 metric tons per person, below San Francisco, at 11.2 metric tons, and the national average, at 24.5. New Yorkers are collectively responsible for one percent of the nation's total greenhouse gas emissions, though comprise 2.7% of the nation's population. The average New Yorker consumes less than half the electricity used by a resident of San Francisco and nearly one-quarter the electricity consumed by a resident of Dallas.

Concentrated pollution in New York City leads to high incidence of asthma and other respiratory conditions among the city's residents. In recent years the city has focused on reducing its environmental impact. The city government is required to purchase only the most energy-efficient equipment for use in city offices and public housing. New York has the largest clean air diesel-hybrid and compressed natural gas bus fleet in the country, and some of the first hybrid taxis. The city is also a leader in the construction of energy-efficient green office buildings, including the Hearst Tower among others.

== Policy and influence ==
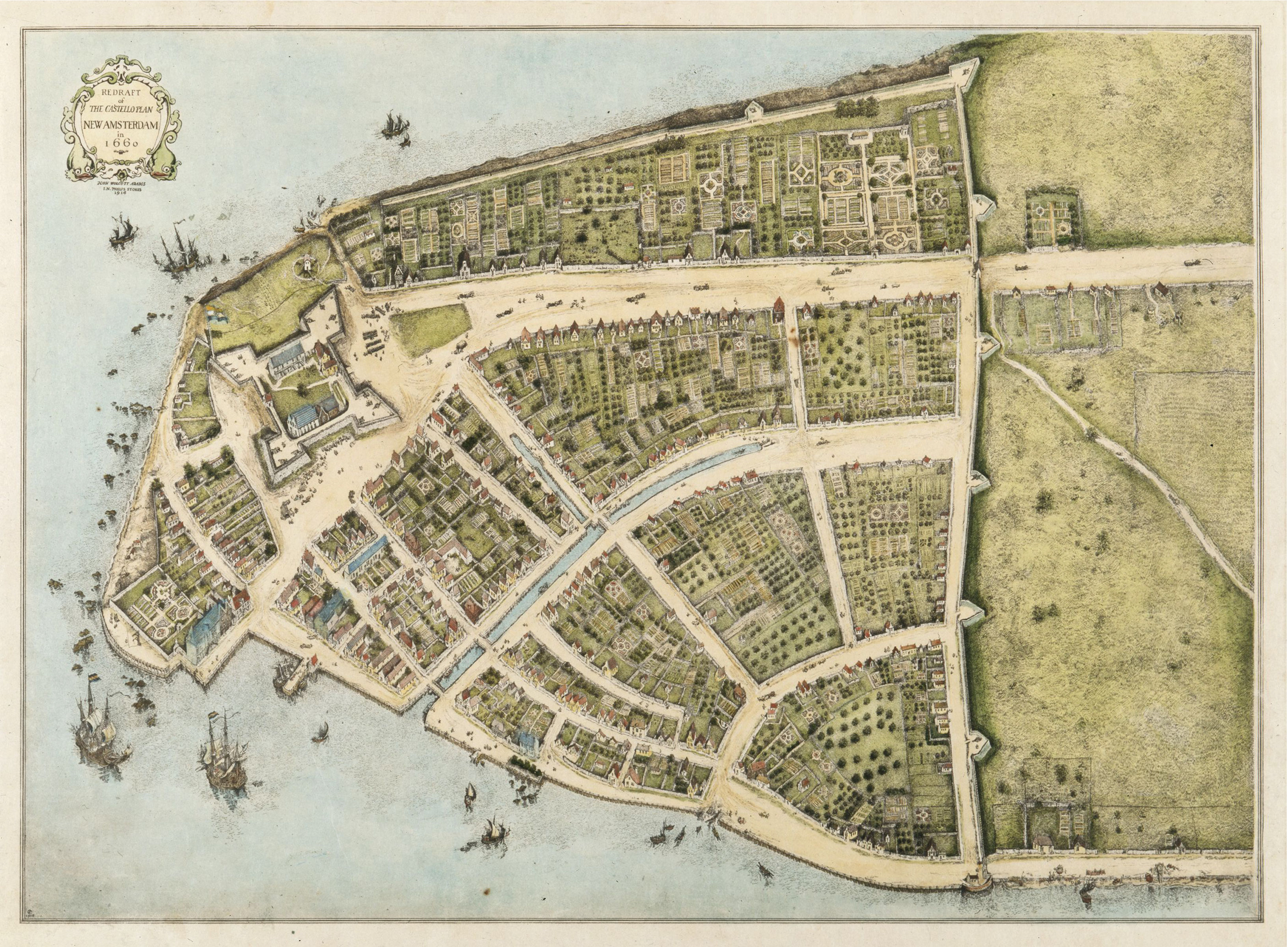
Lower Manhattan in 1660, when it was part of New Amsterdam (Nieuw Amsterdam).

As of 2005, the city has focused on reducing its environmental impact. The city government is required to purchase only the most energy-efficient equipment for use in city offices and public housing. New York has the largest clean-air diesel-hybrid and compressed natural gas bus fleet in the country, and some of the first hybrid taxis. The city is also a leader in energy-efficient "green" office buildings, such as Hearst Tower and 7 World Trade Center.

Environmental groups make large efforts to help shape legislation in New York because they see the strategy as an efficient way to influence national programs. New York City's economy is larger than Switzerland's, a size that means the city has potential to set new de facto standards. Manufacturers are also attuned to the latest trends and needs in the city because the market is simply too big to ignore.

Ex-mayor Michael Bloomberg is one of 248 mayors from 41 states to have signed the U.S. Mayors Climate Protection Agreement. Under the agreement, mayors "strive to meet or beat the Kyoto Protocol targets in their own communities". The city was a petitioner in the landmark Massachusetts v. Environmental Protection Agency Supreme Court case forcing the EPA to regulate greenhouse gases as pollutants.

== Environmental injustices ==
Throughout the history of New York City, there has been undenied mistreatment of vulnerable populations in various aspects which has led to present day environmental injustices that plague many of the neighborhoods that these people live in. This is piled on with current day issues that worsen the quality of life for many individuals. As a result, there has been more of a push for more environmental justice in New York City as many are fighting for safer environments to live in.

=== Redlining ===
The current state of many deteriorating New York City neighborhoods is the result of the long history of redlining. This resulted in many areas (those with high minority populations) not receiving proper development, investment, and poor infrastructure decisions.

Some examples of the issues of redlining include lack of green spaces in low-income minority neighborhoods, the placement of highways in The Bronx, higher incidents of asthma in low-income neighborhoods, and low-income minority neighborhoods being overburdened with waste transfers. These are just a few of the many issues present in the city.

== Energy efficiency ==
Average annual residential electricity usage by city, 2000-2005
City	per-customer kwh use
New York City	4,696
San Francisco	6,753
Chicago	8,143
Phoenix	13,344
Houston	14,542
Dallas	16,611

The city's uniquely high density, encouraged by much of it being surrounded by water, facilitates the highest rate of mass transit use in the United States. New York is one of the most energy efficient cities in the United States as a result. Gasoline consumption in New York is at the rate the national average was in the 1920s. The city's mass transit system, multifamily housing, mixed neighborhoods and the fact that greenfield land is no longer available to development, make building in New York very energy efficient. New York City has a larger population than all but eleven states, and consumes less energy per-capita than any. The average New Yorker consumes a little more than half of the electricity of someone who lives in Chicago and nearly one-quarter the electricity consumed by someone who lives in Dallas.

Nevertheless, New York faces growing energy demands and limited space. The city has introduced a series of environmental policies since the 1990s to address these problems. Detailed measures included switching more than 11,000 traffic lights and pedestrian signals in the city to new energy-efficient light-emitting diodes that use 90% less energy than conventional fixtures. The city replaced 149,000 "cobra head" street lights with new energy-efficient designs by 2008. Over 180,000 inefficient refrigerators in public housing projects have been replaced with new ones that use a quarter of the power of the old ones. By law, the city government can purchase only the most efficient cars, air-conditioners and copy machines. The electricity used to power the Statue of Liberty, Ellis Island and 22 other federal buildings in New York City, an annual electricity demand of roughly 27 million kilowatt hours, is provided by wind power.

New York City is home to several clean energy projects. Two attempts to provide electricity to Roosevelt Island by installing underwater turbines in the East River failed when the turbine blades were torn off by currents. An improved turbine design proved to be successful and on January 23, 2012 FERC issued a 10-year pilot commercial license to Verdant Power's RITE Project – the first commercial license for tidal power in the United States. Under the license, Verdant Power expects to generate up to 1 megawatt after a staged installation of up to 30 turbines. Planning is also underway to construct windmills on a hill in the former Fresh Kills Landfill. The wind energy project would power 5,000 homes on Staten Island.

=== Transportation ===
New York is distinguished from other American cities by its extensive use of public transportation. While nearly 90% of Americans drive to their jobs, public transit is overwhelmingly dominant for New Yorkers. According to the 2000 U.S. census, New York City is the only locality in the United States where more than half of all households do not own a car (the figure is even higher in Manhattan, over 75%; nationally, the rate is 8%). About one-third of users of mass transit in the United States and two-thirds of the nation's rail riders live in New York and its suburbs, and New York City's public transit system accounts for nearly four times as many passenger miles as the Washington, D.C., and Los Angeles metro regions combined. Only 6% of shopping trips by New Yorkers involve the use of a car. Congestion pricing in New York City was approved in March 2024 and is expected to be implemented in June, pending the outcome of lawsuits.

New York City's high rate of transit use saved 1.8 billion US gallons (6,800,000 m^{3}) of oil in 2006 and $4.6 billion in gasoline costs. New York saves half of all the oil saved by transit nationwide. The reduction in oil consumption meant 11.8 million metric tons of carbon dioxide pollution was kept out of the air. The city's extraordinary public transit use means that New Yorkers emit far fewer greenhouse gases on a per capita basis than the average American. New York City's greenhouse gas emissions are 7.1 metric tons per person compared with the national average of 24.5. New Yorkers are collectively responsible for one percent of the nation's total greenhouse gas emissions though comprising 2.7% of the nation's population.

=== Green building ===
For years New York City was slow to embrace green building guidelines used in cities like San Francisco to promote environmentally friendly construction. In the post-World War II construction boom, changes in zoning regulations and the widespread use of air conditioning led to the design of sealed glass and steel towers. Without natural sources of light and ventilation, such buildings required large amounts of fossil fuels to operate.

This phase of building style is rapidly changing in New York, which has become a leader in energy-efficient green office buildings like 7 World Trade Center, which recycles rainwater and uses it in toilets and for irrigation, and computer-controlled heating and lighting. The United States Green Building Council estimates 3,000 new green apartments in New York City have been built since 2001.

In 2000 the state of New York introduced a green building tax credit, the first one of its kind in the United States, that has allowed some developers of environmentally friendly buildings to write off as much as $6 million on their tax bill. The city's Department of Design and Construction developed a set of guidelines in 1999 that encourage environmentally sound building methods for municipal projects. The guidelines had led to approximately $700 million in green city construction projects by the end of 2005. In 2005, New York City mandated that nonresidential public buildings costing $2 million or more be built to standards set by Leadership in Energy and Environmental Design (LEED), which grade buildings in areas like energy and water consumption, indoor air quality and use of renewable materials. The legislation also applies to private projects that receive $10 million or more in public funds or half of whose budgets come from public money.

== Air pollution ==
Prior to the passage of the federal Clean Air Act of 1970 and other local and state regulations in the late 60s, New York City suffered severe smog, with several instances of major smog events like the 1966 New York City smog.

=== High cancer risk from airborne chemicals ===
According to the most recent U.S. Environmental Protection Agency (EPA) National-Scale Air Toxics Assessment study, residents of New York County, NY (Manhattan), have the third highest cancer risk caused by airborne chemicals of all counties in the United States (including the District of Columbia, Puerto Rico, and the Virgin Islands). Manhattan follows only Tippah County, Mississippi (highest risk), and Boyd County, Kentucky (second highest risk). Bronx and Kings Counties rank 8th and 9th out of the 3,223 counties and county-equivalents in the United States, while Queens County ranks 13th nationwide.

The 2024 annual report of the American Lung Association ranks the New York City region as 13th of the 25 most polluted cities by ozone.

=== Air pollution exposure and risk of violent behavior ===
Although the environmental basis of violent behaviors is not well understood, scientists have been able to link air pollution to violent and aggressive behaviors in humans. A 2019 study reported emerging evidence that air pollution causes aggressive or impulsive reactions in people. The study was designed to estimate the change in violent and nonviolent criminal behavior risk associated with short-term air pollution in U.S. counties. The study used daily monitoring data for ozone from EPA, and Federal Bureau of Investigation crime data, for 2002 to 2013. The study evaluated the exposure-response relation and assessed differences in risk by community characteristics of poverty, urbanicity, race, and age. The findings suggest that even a slight increase in air pollution can result in violent behavior, regardless of the community type.

A 2022 research paper by Wesselbaum Dennis studied the effect of weather and air pollution on violent crime and homicides in New York City, using data collected from all the crimes committed in NYC between 2006 and 2020. He concluded that the pollutant carbon monoxide, when present in high concentration increased violent crimes in the city in a U-shaped relation.

New York City is ranked the second most polluted in urban air quality compared to other New York State cities. However with air pollutant increasing during February, June through August, November and December, it was not on the FBI 2022’s ten most dangerous cities in New York State.

=== Emissions management and community impact ===
New York has the largest hybrid bus fleet in the country, and some of the first hybrid taxis. A large percentage of the city-owned vehicle fleet, including the personal cars of top city officials, are required since 2005 to be fuel efficient hybrid vehicles like the Toyota Prius or Honda Accord gas-electric sedan that produce minimal particulates and carbon dioxide emissions. In 2005 the city's vehicle fleet had 6,000 alternative fuel and 70 electric vehicles. A biodiesel processing plant will soon open in Brooklyn that will process 2.5 million US gallons (9,500 m^{3}) of biodiesel a year and distribute it to conventional gas stations in the city.

The Department of Sanitation, which has 1,500 trucks of its 2,200-vehicle fleet on the streets each day, is working with truck manufacturers to introduce gas-electric hybrid garbage trucks. The Department switched to using low-sulfur fuel in 2001 and uses corn-based ethanol in 500 of its 1,500 light-duty trucks.

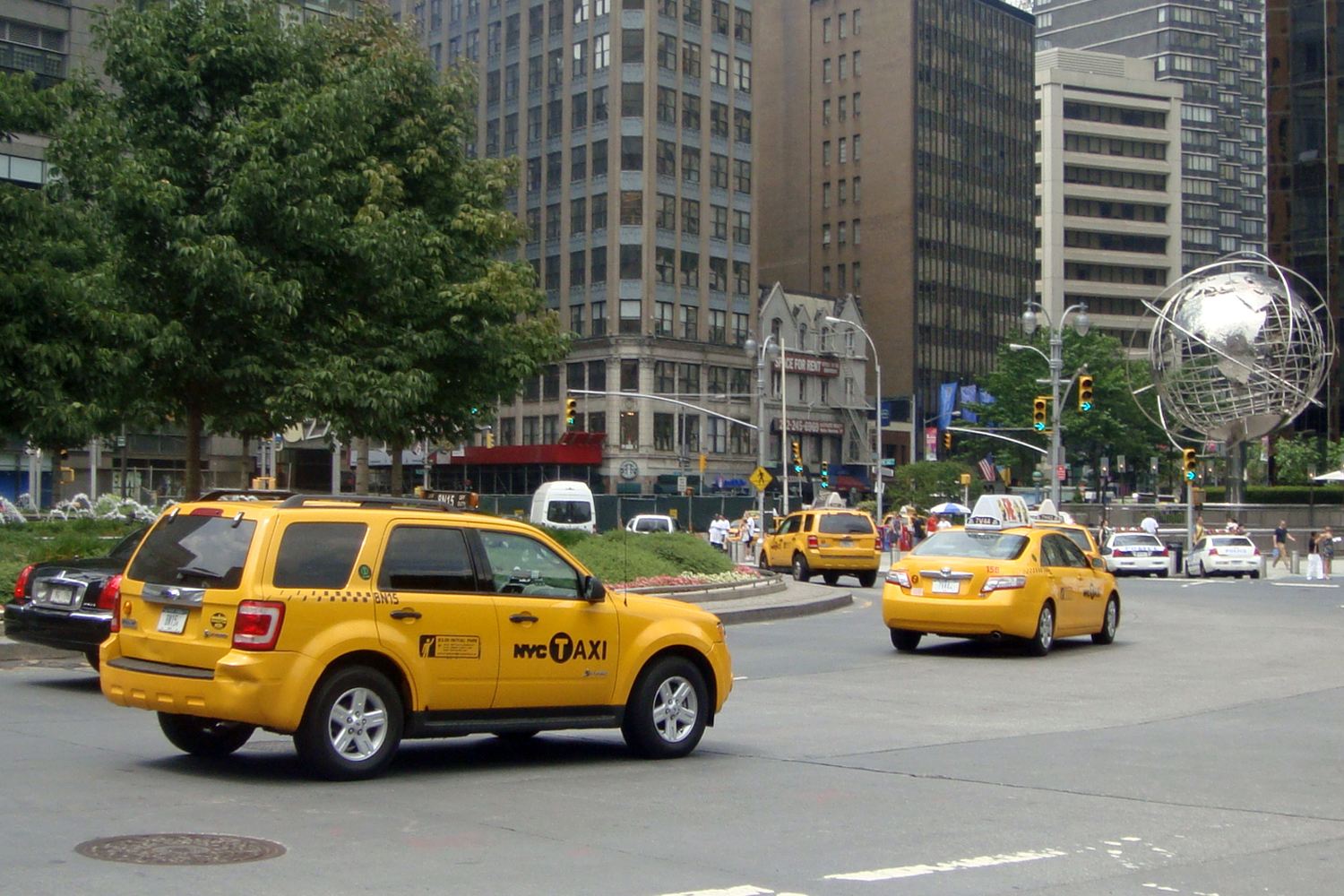
New York City has more than 2,000 hybrid taxis as of mid 2009, more than any other city in North America (although it is also the largest city in North America).

Air pollution is an ongoing political issue in neighborhoods that contain bus depots. A combination of stakeholder interests regarding profit and a lack of space in NYC leads to air pollution being a difficult issue to solve. Waste Factories and other sources of air pollution besides bus depots affect NYC, and particularly affect boroughs like the Bronx and parts of Manhattan.

In New York City, low-income neighborhoods like those in Northern Manhattan and the Bronx, bear a disproportionate share of pollution sources. Health experts have long believed this is the result of environmental racism. This can be defined as “the planned and deliberate targeting of Black and Brown communities in deciding where to place roadways, toxic waste facilities, along with industrial and commercial sites like bus depots and tractor trailer distribution centers” (Dow, 2020).

The Bronx is one of the poorest counties in all of America. When compared to the other boroughs and counties of New York, Bronx County accounts for the highest rate of asthma related emergency room admissions in both the city and the state.

The South Bronx is particularly affected. Asthma is the leading cause of hospitalizations and school absences for Bronx children (Warman et al., 2009). In 2016, there were 42,712 asthma related emergency room admissions in New York City for children ages 0–17. The Bronx accounted for approximately 38% of these cases with 16,378 admissions (Citizens’ Committee for Children, 2016).

Bronx residents are also disproportionately burdened by exposure to transportation generated air pollution. For example, a ring of major highways surrounds the South Bronx: the Cross Bronx Expressway, Major Deegan Expressway, and the Sheridan Expressway. Bus depots, sanitation centers, and shipping facilities also account for the higher rates of emission exposure.

Health professionals and researchers believe that these glaring disparities created a "perfect storm of events" that led to the Bronx becoming an early COVID-19 epicenter.

== Water supply ==
Many of the city's environmental assets are related to geography and a long tradition of environmental stewardship in the mountain ranges north of the city. Because much of the watershed is in one of the largest protected wilderness areas in the United States, the natural water filtration process remains fairly effective, but has been supplemented with engineered filtration and ultraviolet disinfection systems in the early 21st century.

All water entering New York City's distribution system is treated with chlorine, fluoride, food-grade phosphoric acid, and, in some cases, sodium hydroxide, to comply with the New York State Sanitary Code and federal Safe Drinking Water Act disinfection requirements. Fluoride, at a concentration of one part per million, is added to help prevent tooth decay and has been added since 1966 in accordance with the New York City Health Code. Phosphoric acid is added to create a protective film on pipes that reduces the release of metals such as lead and copper from household plumbing.

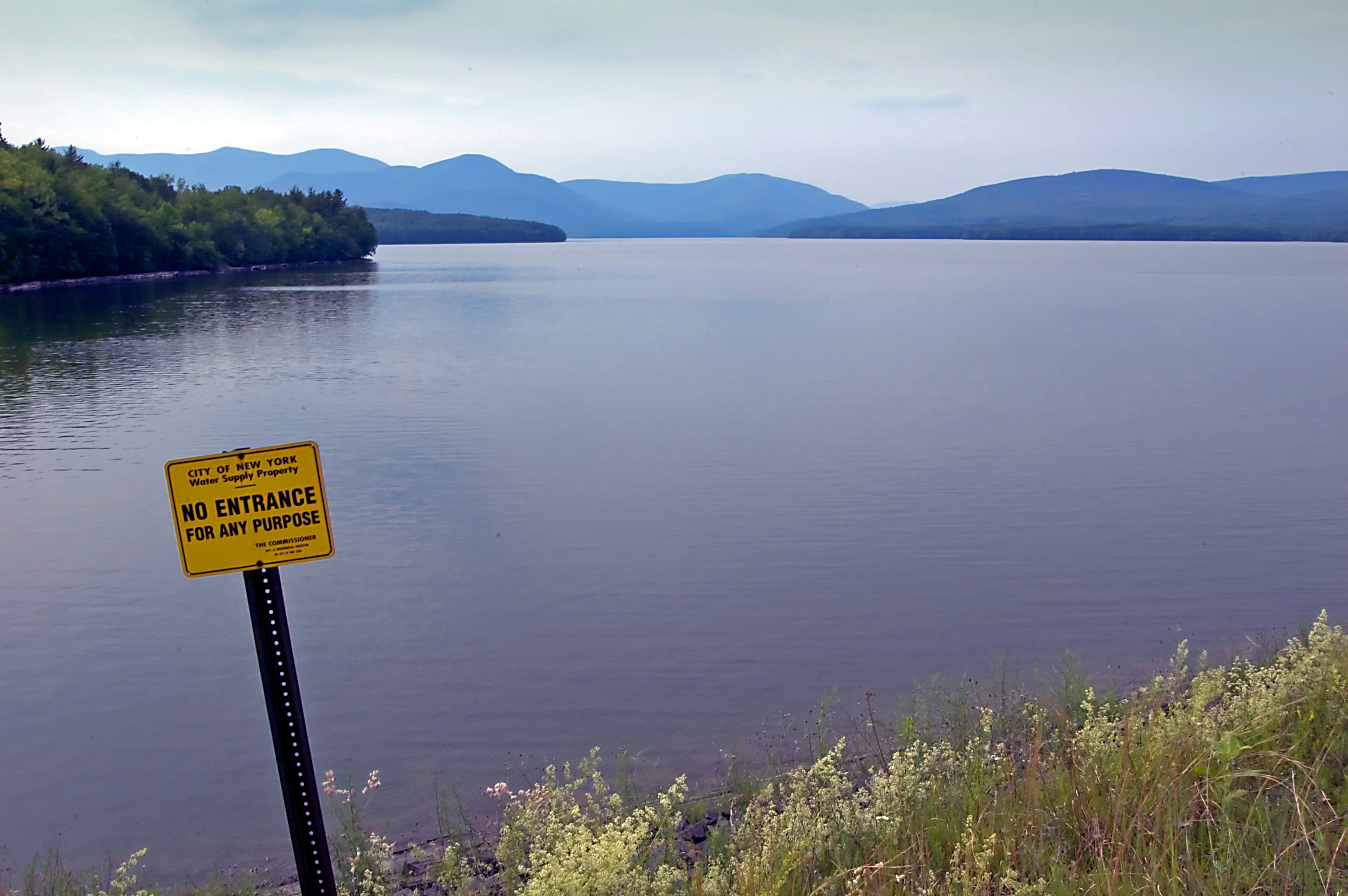
The Ashokan Reservoir is one of several providing drinking water for New York City.

The complex New York City water supply system—with 19 reservoirs bringing mountain water from as far as 125 miles (201 km) away through a gravity-fed web of aqueducts — consists of three different systems. The Croton system, the oldest and smallest section, sits in Westchester and Putnam Counties. The second oldest is the Catskill system. In the early years of the 20th century, the city and state allocated thousands of acres in the eastern Catskill Mountains to build two reservoirs that more than doubled the city's capacity. In the 1950s and 1960s, the city expanded again with the Delaware Aqueduct, tapping the east and west branches of the Delaware River and other tributaries to create the newest and largest of its three systems.

The Croton system is the source of some turbidity issues for the city's water. The turbidity problem stems largely from conditions that have been present in the Catskill system from the beginning. Engineering studies in 1903 recognized that the clay of the steeply sloped eastern Catskills turned the clear waters of the Schoharie and Esopus Creeks muddy after storms. Engineers decided to go ahead anyway, devising a two-reservoir system with built-in turbidity controls. The city has sought to restrict development throughout its watershed. One of its largest watershed protection programs is the Land Acquisition Program, under which the New York City Department of Environmental Protection has purchased or protected through conservation easement over 70,000 acres (280 km^{2}) since 1997. Turbidity problems continued in the Croton system throughout the 20th century, leading to violations of environmental regulations and a 1997 lawsuit against the city by the federal government and the State of New York. In response the city built the Croton Water Filtration Plant, which began operation in 2015.

The city added ultraviolet disinfection (UV) treatment in the early 21st century, to eliminate protozoa such as cryptosporidium and giardia. The Catskill-Delaware Water Ultraviolet Disinfection Facility opened in 2013, and a UV system was included in the new Croton filtration plant (2015).

In the 12 months that ended on June 30, 2006, daily consumption averaged 1.086 billion US gallons (4,110,000 m^{3}) in the city, a decline of 5.2% since 2002 and the lowest total daily use since 1951, when the city had about 7.9 million people and New York was experiencing a severe drought. Daily consumption peaked at 1.512 billion US gallons (5,720,000 m^{3}) in 1979; in the next year's census, the city's population was 7.1 million, its lowest since 1930. Despite having grown to a population of 8.2 million in 2006, the city is now using 28% less water than it did in 1979. The drop in consumption is mostly a result of city policy; water-saving plumbing fixtures and devices in renovations and new construction are required, the city has been more diligent in finding and fixing leaks, and since the late 1980s it has been metering residential customers’ water use. The city uses sonar and other equipment to more efficiently find and fix leaks in its millions of feet of water mains and has taken steps like installing sprinkler caps on fire hydrants during the summer, letting overheated kids cool off without torrents of gushing water.

== Garbage disposal ==
In September 2012, Travel+Leisure named New York City the #1 'America's Dirtiest City', from the results of a readership survey rating 35 "Favorite Cities" in the United States.

In 2001 Mayor Rudolph Giuliani closed the Fresh Kills Landfill on Staten Island. The City did not have a subsequent plan for garbage disposal. An interim system was put in place in which most of the city's garbage was trucked out of the city to landfills in other states. In 2006 Mayor Michael Bloomberg signed legislation establishing a new solid waste management plan, which will use barges and trains to export 90% of the city's 12,000 daily tons of residential trash. Under the previous scheme trucks and tractor-trailers were used for 84% of the trash. Passage of the new legislation was delayed by opponents in a Manhattan neighbourhood who protested the use of a marine transfer station in the Hudson River Park. Environmentalists and social activists argued the plan promoted environmental justice because no one borough or neighbourhood would bear a disproportionate burden under the proposal, and they, therefore, supported it.

== Other issues ==
Much of the city's housing stock is old, and lead paint is an ongoing public health issue. Some parts of the city are also at risk if current global warming patterns continue and sea levels rise.

The city is home to several thriving non-native species of plants and animals. Populations of wild South American monk parakeets, also known as the Quaker parrot, live in Greenwood Cemetery, Marine Park, Bensonhurst, and Bay Ridge in Brooklyn, and in the East Bronx.

=== Farmers' markets ===
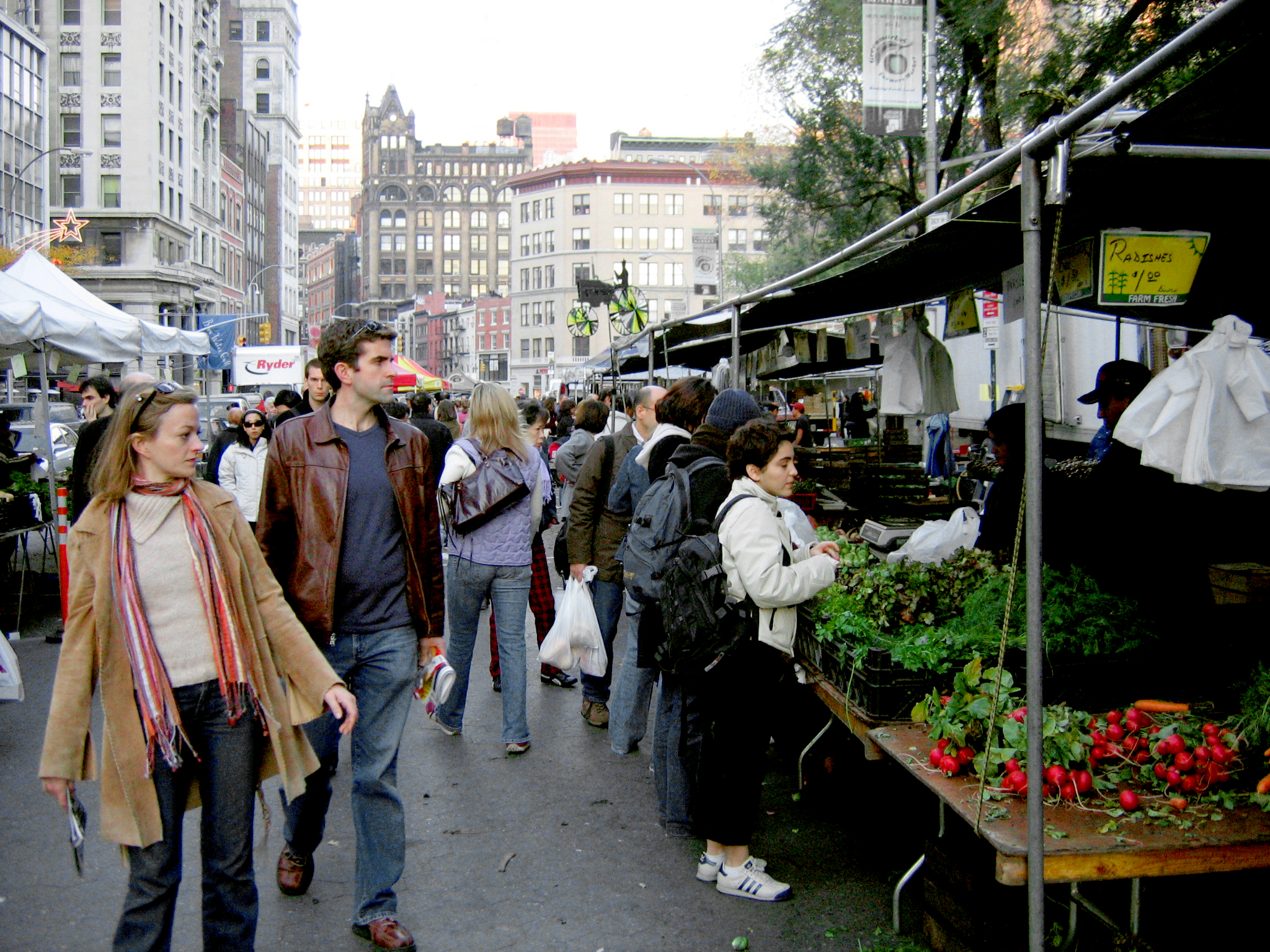
The farmers' market at Union Square.

In 1976 the Council on the Environment of New York City established the Greenmarket program, which provides regional small family farmers opportunities to sell their fruits, vegetables and other farm products at open-air markets in city public squares. The Greenmarket program manages 45 markets in the five boroughs. More than 100 New York City restaurants source their ingredients from Greenmarket farmers each week; Greenmarket farmers also annually donate about 500,000 pounds of food to City Harvest and other hunger relief organizations each year. The most famous location is the Union Square Greenmarket, held Monday, Wednesday, Friday, and Saturday between 8 a.m. and 6 p.m. year-round. The market has 250,000 customers a week who purchase 1,000 varieties of fruits and vegetables at the market.

The markets are anchored by 164 farmers who travel a median distance of 90 miles (140 km), including 90 vegetable and orchard growers, 29 meat, dairy, poultry, wool and fish producers, 12 producers of honey, maple syrup, jam, and wine, 19 growers of plants and flowers, and 14 bakers.

In 2006 the City Council announced it would make farmers' markets the centerpiece of efforts to reduce hunger and increase awareness of nutrition in the city, especially in lower-income areas, and that 10 new farmers' markets would open serving low-income neighborhoods including public housing projects.

=== Greenpoint oil spill ===
The Greenpoint neighborhood of Brooklyn was once home to many oil refineries for more than a century. In 1950, Mobil was alleged to have spilled 17 million US gallons (64,000 m^{3}) of oil into Newtown Creek in what is one of the worst oil spills in United States history. Oil continues seeping into a city waterway decades after the leak was first noticed.

The oil business has largely moved elsewhere, but countless small and large spills went unnoticed for decades and eventually formed a subterranean blob of more than 50 acres (200,000 m^{2}). Authorities have been aware of the problem since 1978. ExxonMobil accepted responsibility for much of the damage in 1990 and has since pumped some 9 million US gallons (34,000 m^{3}) out of the ground.

The slow pace of the cleanup, however, has increasingly angered Greenpoint residents and elected officials, who have launched a series of lawsuits against ExxonMobil in 2004. In June 2006 the New York State Department of Environmental Conservation announced it would sue ExxonMobil to hasten completion of the cleanup.

=== Skyscrapers ===
Recent studies have shown that the city may be sinking into the ocean due to the excessive amount of Skyscrapers in Lower Manhattan. Other studies have shown that the city is built on bedrock and it is sinking due to global warming and rising water levels.

=== Pests ===
There are typically 40-50 rats within a colony, and rat colonies are territorial. Two colonies are unlikely to inhabit the exact location, which would suggest what the rat population within New York would be. A 2014 paper estimated the rat population of New York City proper to be about 2 million, or one for every four people. In 2013 Evangelista et al. first detected the Japanese cockroach (Periplaneta japonica). The Japanese joins four congeners that already inhabited the city (and other cities in North and South America), P. americana, P. fuliginosa, P. brunnea, and P. australasiae. This is the first detection of P. japonica anywhere in North America. Carlen & Munshi-South 2020 find that the city's building landscape is helping feral pigeon gene flow here, contrary to the case of rats (see Rats in New York City § Genetics). In 2010, a rising number of bed bugs were reported in the city.

== See also ==
- Climate change in New York City
- Health effects arising from the September 11 attacks
- New York City Department of Environmental Protection
- OneNYC
- PlaNYC
