= Climate change in New York (state) =

Climate change in the US state of New York

A map of Köppen climate types of New York shows that parts of the state are becoming humid-subtropical.

Climate change in New York encompasses the effects of climate change, attributed to man-made increases in atmospheric greenhouse gases, in the U.S. state of New York. It is of concern due to its impact on the people, ecosystem, and economy of the state. Many parts of the state are already experiencing weather changes, and sea-level rise, and threatening local communities.

New York State ranks 46th among the 50 states in the amount of greenhouse gases generated per person. This relative efficient energy usage is primarily due to the dense, compact settlement in the New York City metropolitan area, and the high rate of mass transit use in this area and between major cities. The main sources of greenhouse gases per the state government are transportation, buildings, electricity generation, waste, refrigerants, and agriculture. In 2019 the state pledged to eliminate net greenhouse gas emissions by 2050. In 2021, New York experienced areas of extreme flooding due to Hurricane Ida, which was noted as having characteristics that are probably more common in a warmer climate: the intensity, the rapid intensification, and the amount of rainfall over land.

== Effects of climate change in New York ==
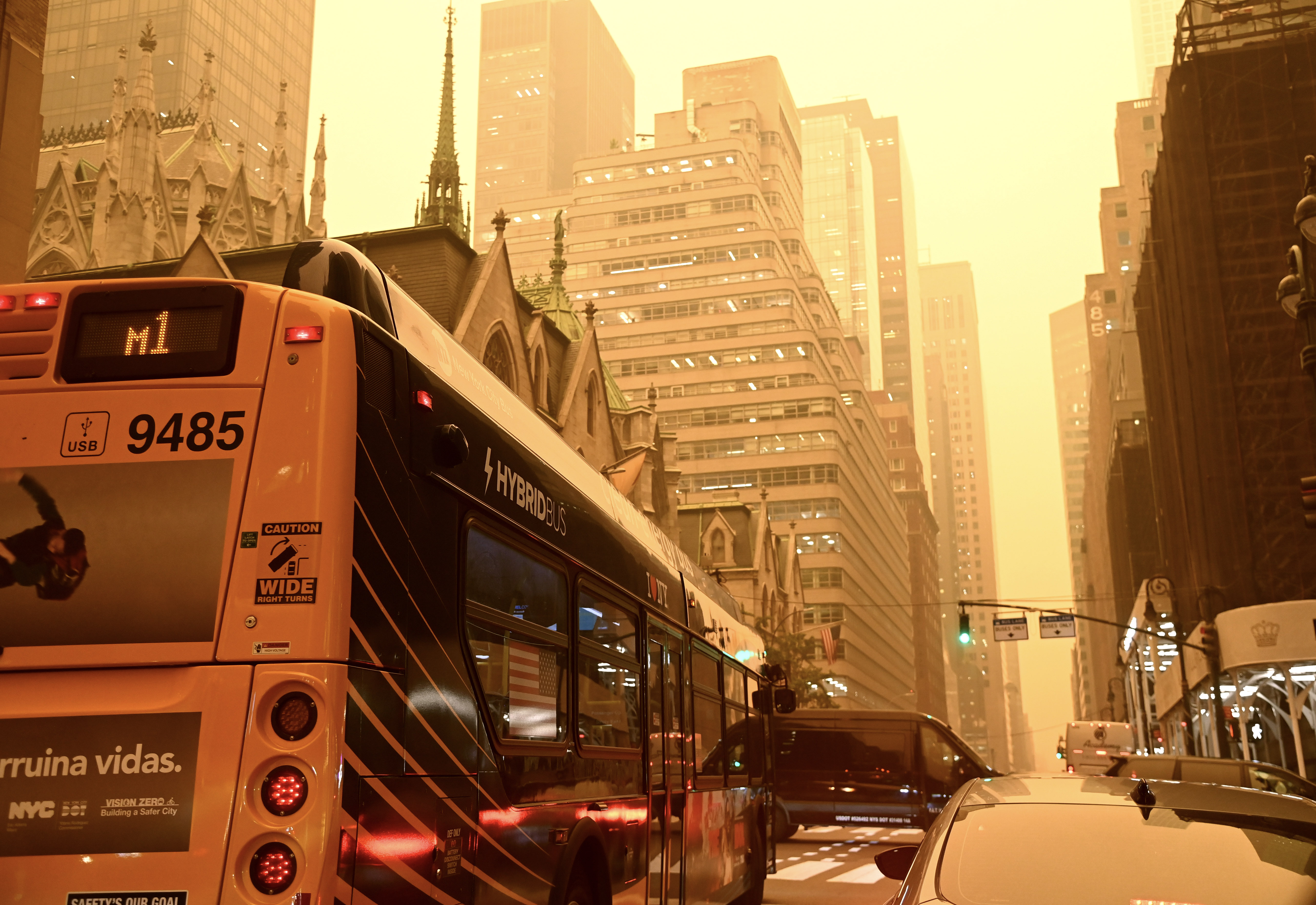
Wildfire smoke pollution, 2023

=== Temperature ===
The United States Environmental Protection Agency has noted that "[m]ost of the state has warmed one to three °F (0.5 - 2 °C) in the last century", and New York State Department of Environmental Conservation has further observed that "[t]he annual average temperature statewide has risen about 2.4 °F (1.3 °C) since 1970, with winter warming exceeding 4.4 °F (2.4 °C).

A 2024 report for the New York State Energy Research and Development Authority found that the average temperatures in New York State have increased almost 2.6°F since 1901. Depending upon the emissions scenario, the temperature is predicted to increase 3.8–6.7°F by the 2050s, and 5.1–10.9°F by the 2080s (relative to 1981-2010 baseline).

=== Climate ===
By the 2080s, the average annual temperature in New York City is expected to be the same as in Birmingham, Alabama today.

=== Precipitation ===
"During the next century, annual precipitation and the frequency of heavy downpours are likely to keep rising. Precipitation is likely to increase during winter and spring, but not change significantly during summer and fall."

=== Coastal areas ===
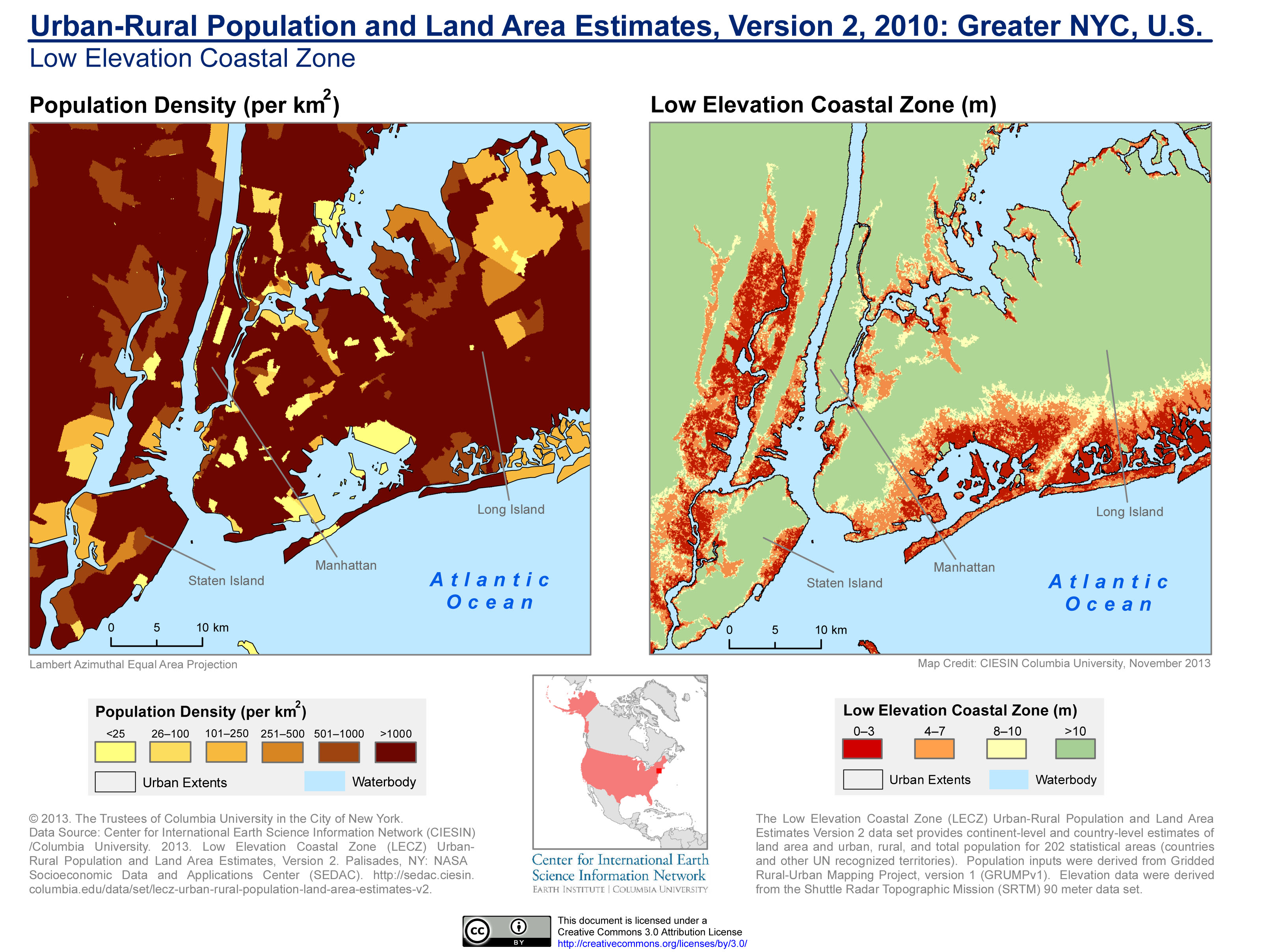
Population density and elevation above sea level in Greater NYC, U.S. (2010)

"Sea levels along New York's coast have already risen more than a foot since 1900." "Sea level is rising more rapidly along New York's coast than in most coastal areas because the land surface is sinking. If the oceans and atmosphere continue to warm, tidal waters in New York are likely to rise one to four feet in the next century." According to a 2011 report commissioned by the New York State Energy Research and Development Authority, "there is a high amount of low-income housing that would be in the path of flooding". "Climate change is estimated to cause the sea level along the coast of New York City to rise anywhere from one to three and a half feet by 2080 at a cost of billions of dollars in lost property and assets."

Unless action is taken, the United States Geological Survey predicts that by 2100, "the barrier islands in Southampton would be broken up by new inlets or lost to erosion if sea level rises three feet."

These concerns about coastal dangers have remained highly consistent over time. As early as 2006, Stern Review, the largest, most comprehensive economic analysis of climate change to that point, projected that warming of 3 or 4 °C (5.4 or 7.2 °F) would lead to serious risks and increasing pressures for coastal protection in New York State.

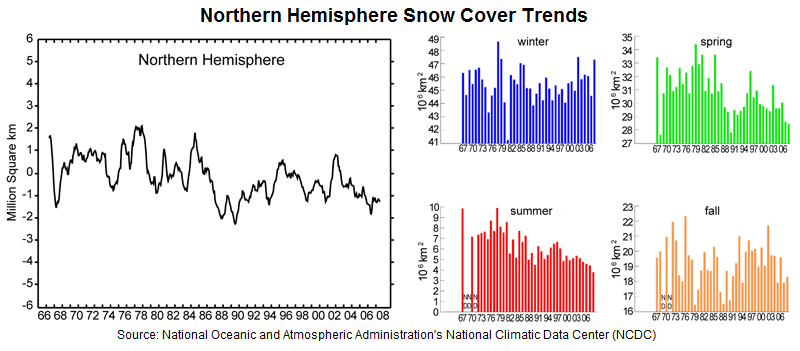
This graph shows the decrease in snow cover in the Northern Hemisphere associated with climate changes from 1966 to 2008.

=== The Great Lakes ===
New York borders Lake Ontario and Lake Erie to the west. "The levels of Lake Erie and Lake Ontario are expected to drop due to increased evaporation and lower recharge rates caused by climate change. Lake Erie levels are expected to decrease by as much as five feet by 2100, threatening wildlife and reducing waters supplies for electricity generation." Warmer temperatures cause algae blooms, "which can be unsightly, harm fish, and degrade water quality".

Reduced ice cover on the Great Lakes extends the shipping season, as ice prevents navigation in the Great Lakes.

Buffalo and its metropolitan area are described as climate change havens for their weather pattern in Western New York.

=== Agriculture ===
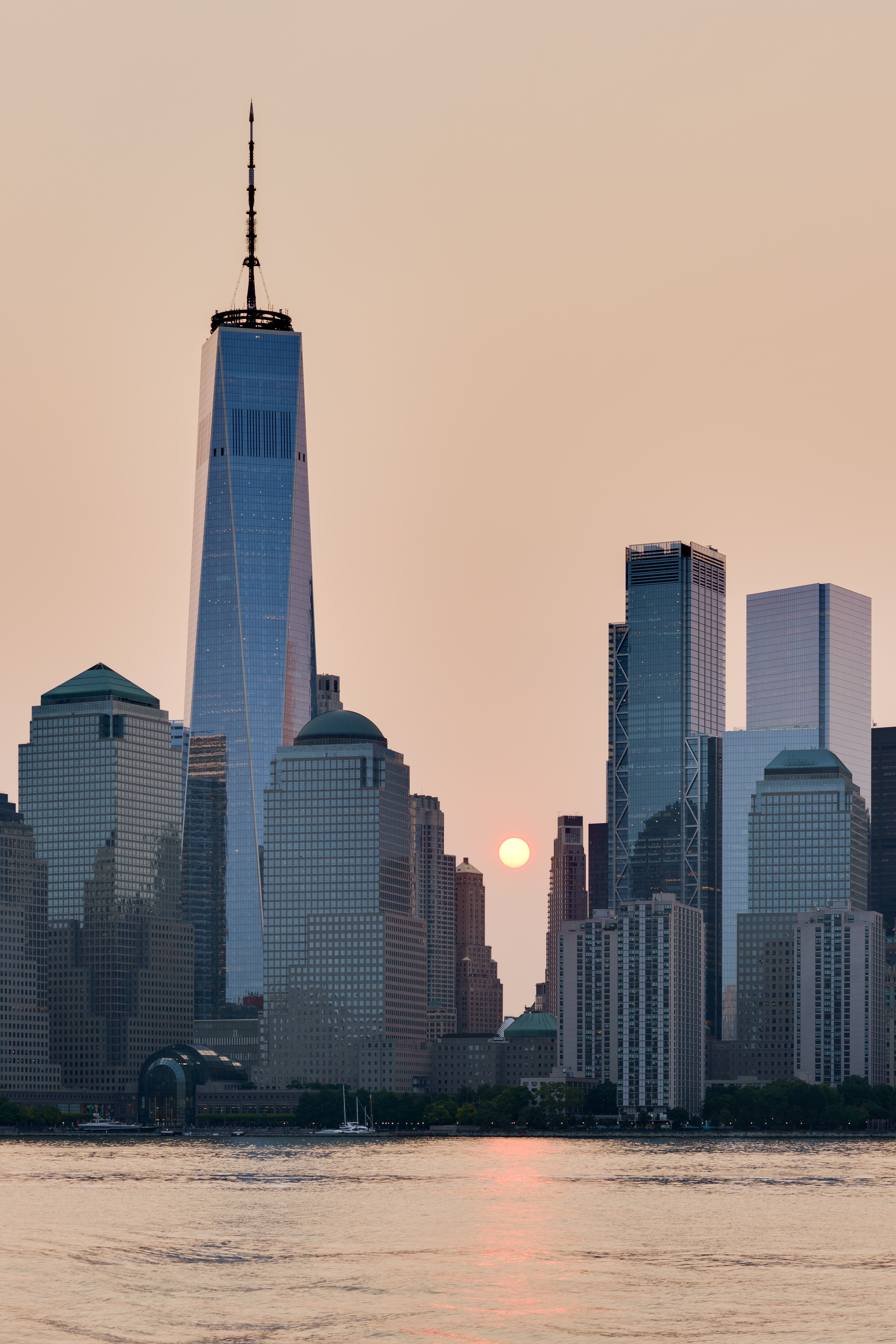
Smog from wildfires, Hudson River, 2020

According to a 2011 report, if warming trends continue, "none of the varieties of apples currently grown in New York orchards would be viable. Dairy farms would be less productive as cows faced heat stress. And the state's forests would be transformed; spruce-fir forests and alpine tundra would disappear as invasive species like kudzu, an aggressive weed, gained more ground." The EPA notes that "increasingly hot summers are likely to reduce yields of corn, the state's most important crop. Higher temperatures cause cows to eat less and produce less milk, so a warming climate could reduce the output of milk and beef, which together account for more than half the state's farm revenues".

=== Ecosystems ===
"Wetlands threatened by rising sea level currently support clapper rail, sharp-tailed sparrow, marsh wren, and the northern harrier, a threatened species."

"Striped bass is expected to experience a major loss in habitat as ocean temperatures rise, especially in the southern part of its range"

Climate change has also been asserted to be the cause of growing rat infestations in the state, as "[m]ilder winters — the result of climate change — make it easier for rats to survive and reproduce".

== Adaptation to climate change in New York ==
The Community Risk and Resiliency Act (CRRA), signed into law in September 2014 by New York Governor Andrew Cuomo, requires that applicants to certain state permitting and funding programs "demonstrate that they have taken into account future physical climate risks from storm surges, sea-level rise or flooding". It also "requires the Department of Environmental Conservation (DEC) to adopt science-based sea-level rise projections into regulation" and "adds mitigation of risk due to sea-level rise, storm surge and flooding to the list of smart-growth criteria to be considered by state public-infrastructure agencies".

In December 2019, New York joined consideration for a multi-state gasoline cap-and-trade program. The plan aims to reduce transportation-related tailpipe emissions, and would levy a tax on fuel companies based on carbon dioxide emissions. The most ambitious version of the plan is projected to reduce the area's tailpipe emissions by 25% between 2022 and 2032. The program is in the public comment phase, with individual states determining whether to participate. The program could begin as early as 2022.

== See also ==
- Climate change policy of New York (state)
- Climate change in New York City
- Plug-in electric vehicles in New York (state)
