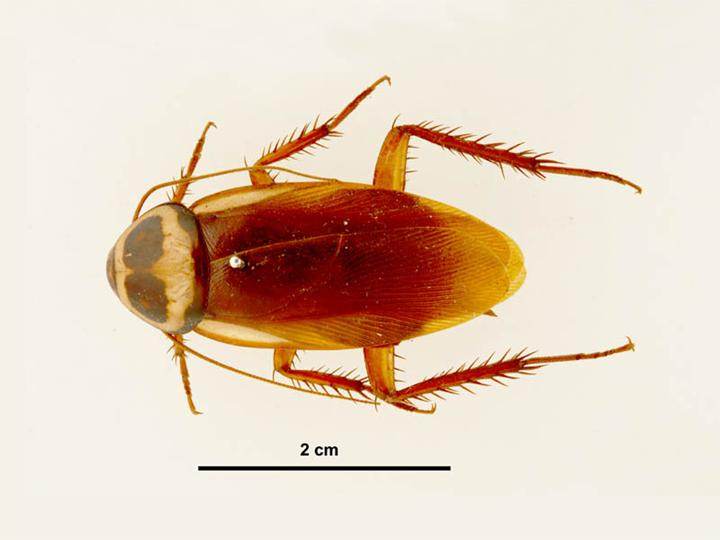
- Validiblatta australasiae, the type species.

Scientific classification
- Kingdom: Animalia
- Phylum: Arthropoda
- Clade: Pancrustacea
- Class: Insecta
- Order: Blattodea
- Family: Blattidae
- Subfamily: Blattinae
- Genus: Validiblatta; Luo & Wang, 2025

Type species
- Blatta australasiae Fabricius, 1775

= Validiblatta =

Genus of large cockroaches

Validiblatta is a genus of large cockroaches in the family Blattidae, established in 2025 following a major phylogenetic revision of the subfamily Blattinae. The genus comprises several synanthropic species formerly placed in the genus Periplaneta, most notably the cosmopolitan pest Validiblatta australasiae (the Australian cockroach).

Members of this genus are distributed globally due to human activity, though the member species are believed to have originated in tropical Africa.

== Taxonomy and systematics ==
For over a century, the genus Periplaneta (Burmeister, 1838) served as a polyphyletic wastebasket taxon for many large, reddish-brown cockroaches. Molecular phylogenetic studies conducted in the early 21st century consistently demonstrated that the type species of Periplaneta (P. americana, the American cockroach) was not the closest relative of other species in the group, such as P. australasiae and P. brunnea, requiring a formal separation.

In 2025, a comprehensive taxonomic revision formally split the genus. The American cockroach was retained in Periplaneta, while the australasiae species group was moved to a new genus.

=== Naming history ===
The authors of the 2025 revision initially proposed the name Fortiblatta (Latin: fortis, meaning "strong") for the new genus. However, the name was quickly identified as a junior homonym of an extinct fossil cockroach genus. In accordance with the International Code of Zoological Nomenclature, the replacement name Validiblatta was established later that same year.

== Description ==
Species of Validiblatta are large, robust insects, typically measuring 25–40 mm (0.98–1.57 in) in length. They are characterized by a reddish-brown to dark-brown base coloration.

Distinctive morphological features separating Validiblatta from Periplaneta include:

- Pronotal Markings: A strongly contrasting yellow or pale margin on the pronotum, which is particularly sharp in V. australasiae.
- Tegmina: The forewings (tegmina) often feature a yellow or pale streak along the costal (outer) margin near the base.
- Genitalia: Distinct configurations of the male subgenital plate and phallic sclerites, which were the primary morphological drivers for the generic split.

Both sexes possess fully developed wings and are capable of flight, particularly in warm temperatures.

== Biology and life cycle ==
=== Ecology ===
Validiblatta species are omnivorous detritivores. While they are often associated with human structures, they are fundamentally outdoor species in their native tropical ranges. They prefer high humidity and are commonly found in decaying leaf litter, hollow trees, and woodpiles.

In temperate climates, they are restricted to heated environments such as greenhouses, steam tunnels, and sewer systems, earning them the nickname "greenhouse cockroaches."

=== Reproduction ===
Like all members of the order Blattodea, Validiblatta undergoes hemimetabolous metamorphosis (egg, nymph, adult). Females produce an ootheca (egg case), which contains 20–24 eggs. Females typically drop or glue the ootheca to a substrate in a concealed location shortly after it is formed.

== Species ==
The following species were transferred to Validiblatta as of the 2025 revision:

- Validiblatta australasiae (Fabricius, 1775) – Australian cockroach. The type species of the genus.
- Validiblatta brunnea (Burmeister, 1838) – Brown cockroach.
- Validiblatta fuliginosa (Serville, 1839) – Smokybrown cockroach.

== Pest status ==
Members of Validiblatta are significant sanitary pests. They can mechanically transmit pathogens such as Salmonella and E. coli on their legs and bodies. Because they frequent decaying organic matter and sewage, their presence in food preparation areas is a health risk.

However, Validiblatta species are generally considered "peridomestic"—they often live around the perimeter of homes (in mulch, woodpiles, or drains) and enter structures only incidentally or in search of water, rather than infesting the interior living spaces permanently.

== See also ==
- Periplaneta americana
