= Campaign for New York's Future =

The Campaign for New York's Future is a coalition of civic, business, environmental, labor, community and public health organizations that supports the goals and strategic direction of New York City Mayor Michael Bloomberg's sustainability proposal, PlaNYC 2030.

== Members ==
- 600 Grand Block Association
- AARP
- American Cancer Society
- American Institute of Architects, New York Chapter
- American Lung Association of the City of New York
- American Lung Association of New York State
- American Planning Association
- Atlantic Avenue Betterment Association
- Better Hood Pacific Street Block Association
- Bryant Park Corporation
- Building and Construction Trades Council of Greater New York
- Building Trades Employers Association
- Chinese Chamber of Commerce of New York
- Citizens Committee for New York City
- Council on the Environment NYC (CENYC)
- Crow Hill Community Association
- Design Trust for Public Space
- District Council 9, Painters
- District Council 1707, AFSCME
- Drum Major Institute
- Environmental Defense
- General Contractors Association
- Gowanus Stakeholders Group
- Hispanic Federation
- Iron Hills Civic Association
- Latin American Chaplains Association
- Lin Sing Association
- Long Island Progressive Coalition
- Mason Tenders District Council
- Metropolitan Waterfront Alliance
- Midland Beach Civic Association
- Morningside Heights Coalition
- Natural Resources Defense Council
- Neighbors Advocating for Good Growth (NAG)
- New Partners for Community Revitalization
- New York AREA
- New York Building Congress
- New York City District Council of Carpenters
- New York City Healthy Schools Network
- New York Hispanic Chamber of Commerce
- New York Industrial Retention Network
- New York League of Conservation Voters
- New York Urban Land Institute District Council
- North Brooklyn Alliance
- North Brooklyn Development Corp.
- Nos Quedamos
- NYC Apollo Alliance
- NYC Central Labor Council
- Pacific 400 Block Association
- Partnership for New York City
- Pratt Center for Community Development
- Project for Public Spaces
- Prospect Place 300 Association
- Regional Plan Association
- Rev. Anne Grant- Triumphant New Destiny
- Rev. Carlyle Thorbs- Baptist Ministers Conference
- Rev. Cecil Henry- Calvary Community Church
- Rev. Eddie Okyere- Miracle Church of Christ
- Rev. Gregory Roberson Smith- Mother Zion AME
- Rev. Les Mullings- Church of Nazarene
- Rev. Luc Gurrier- Sanctified Church of God
- Rev. Robert Lowe- Mt. Moriah AME Church
- Rev. Timothy Mitchell- Antioch Baptist Church
- Riverkeeper
- Scenic Hudson
- SEIU 32BJ
- Soho Alliance
- South Beach Civic Association
- Straphangers Campaign, NYPIRG
- Teamsters, Joint Council 16
- The New York City Environmental Justice Alliance
- Transport Workers Union Local 100
- Transportation Alternatives
- Tri-State Transportation Campaign
- Trust for Public Land
- Urban Agenda
- UPROSE
- Vision Long Island
- WE ACT for Environmental Justice
- Western Jackson Heights Alliance
- Women's City Club
- Youth Ministries for Peace and Justice Peace and Justice

== See also ==
- Congestion Pricing
- New York congestion pricing
