= PlaNYC =

Strategic plan for New York City

PlaNYC was a strategic plan released by New York City Mayor Michael Bloomberg in 2007 to prepare the city for one million more residents, strengthen the economy, combat climate change, and enhance the quality of life for all New Yorkers. The plan brought together over 25 City agencies to work toward the vision of a greener, greater New York and significant progress was made towards the long-term goals over the following years.

PlaNYC specifically targeted ten areas of interest: Housing and Neighborhoods; Parks and Public Spaces; Brownfields; Waterways; Water Supply; Transportation; Energy; Air Quality; Solid Waste; and Climate Change.

Over 97% of the 127 initiatives in PlaNYC were launched within one-year of its release and almost two-thirds of its 2009 milestones were achieved or mostly achieved. The plan was updated in 2011 and was expanded to 132 initiatives and more than 400 specific milestones for December 31, 2013.

Daniel L. Doctoroff, the deputy mayor for economic development and rebuilding, led the team of experts that developed the plan, which The New York Times called the Bloomberg administration's "most far-reaching"—"its fate could determine whether his administration will be remembered as truly transformative."

In April 2015, an updated strategic document outlining city policies for inclusive growth, sustainability, and resilience to climate change was released as One New York: The Plan for a Strong and Just City or OneNYC.

== Components ==
The plan had three major components:

- OpeNYC: Preparation for a sharp rise in New York City's population, expected to increase by more than one million over two decades.
- MaintaiNYC: Repairing aging infrastructure, including city bridges, water mains, mass transit, building codes and power plants.
- GreeNYC: Conserving New York City resources, with a goal of reducing New York City's carbon emissions by 30%.

=== Congestion pricing ===
One of the most controversial aspects of the plan was the mayor's call for congestion pricing, specifically a bid to levy a fee of $8.00 on all cars entering midtown Manhattan during peak hours on weekdays, with a few exemptions for through traffic. The proposal was canceled in 2008 despite support from environmental groups and the governor's office because of great opposition from residents in Brooklyn and Queens (on Long Island), who would have had to pay a toll to enter and exit the island.

A major criticism stemmed from the plan's assumption that more riders could use mass transit. New York City Transit, after doing an analysis of each subway route, revealed that many subway routes were already used to capacity, and that the tracks allowed no room to add more trains. Promoters of this mechanism argued that the system could generate much needed funds for MTA Capital Construction projects such as the Second Avenue Subway, 7 Subway Extension, and East Side Access.

=== Climate change mitigation ===
In 2007, the city aimed to reduce greenhouse gas emissions by 30 percent of the 2005 levels by 2030. Emissions were reduced by 13 percent between 2007 and 2011. This was attributed to a 26 percent decrease in carbon intensity present in the city's electrical supply during this period as a result of more efficient power plants and increased use of renewable energy. Con Edison also stepped in to curb the threat of fugitive sulfur hexafluoride leakage in its electricity transmission and distribution system, which further lowered emissions by 3 percent.

Mitigation efforts included switching fuel sources to cleaner energy. A decrease in demand for energy consumption, new solid waste management strategies, and more sustainable transportation systems were projected to result in a 30 percent decrease in greenhouse gas emissions for the city.

In 2011, the Department of Environmental Protection (DEP) enforced its Climate Change Program Assessment and Action Plan by researching the potential effects of climate change on the city's water supply. Areas projected to be affected were determined by the DEP's climate change impact scenarios. Funded projects included the Croton Walter Filtration Plant, which opened in 2015 to filter sediments entering the water supply after storms, and the renovation of the Delaware Aqueduct. The DEP took action on its own projects such as improving the sewage system by developing a new stormwater drainage strategy focused on areas threatened by flooding and sewer backups and overflows. There was an overall emphasis on maximizing synergy and minimizing tradeoffs among energy, air, water, land, and climate policies.

== Support ==
PlaNYC was supported by Campaign for New York's Future, a coalition of civic, business, environmental, labor, community and public health organizations.

== Sustainable Energy Property Tracking System ==
According to a study by the mayor's office, the city's municipal buildings accounted for nearly 3.8 million metric tons of greenhouse gas emissions each year and utilized 6.5 percent of the city's energy. The city's rate of energy consumption in NYC municipal buildings totaled nearly $1 billion each year, and accounted for about 64 percent of the city's greenhouse gas emissions. One of the main goals of Mayor Bloomberg's PlaNYC was to reduce greenhouse gas emissions by 30 percent by 2030.

In order to meet this goal, the government of New York City signed an agreement worth more than ten million dollars with TRIRIGA an integrated workplace management system and environmental sustainability software provider that was later acquired by IBM, through which the city would deploy TRIRIGA's environmental and energy management software across more than 4,000 government buildings throughout the city.

New York City used performance data from IBM TRIRIGA system to provide the city with the critical analysis required to implement carbon reduction strategies and to inform the project selection process for PlaNYC funded retrofit projects.

Energy and water usage were measured and entered into the Sustainable Energy Property Tracking System (SEPTS) to help identify resource-intensive facilities and prioritize energy efficiency investment decisions.

Note: TRIRIGA product was replatformed and renamed Maximo Real Estate and Facilities, since June 2025 being part of IBM Maximo Application Suite.
