= OneNYC =

2015 development plan for New York City

OneNYC is the official strategic plan of New York City for development based on "principles of growth, equity, sustainability, and resiliency." It was released in April 2015 as the successor document to PlaNYC and has been followed by yearly progress reports.

== See also ==
- Climate change in New York City
- Environmental issues in New York City
- Urban planning
