= Climate change in New York City =

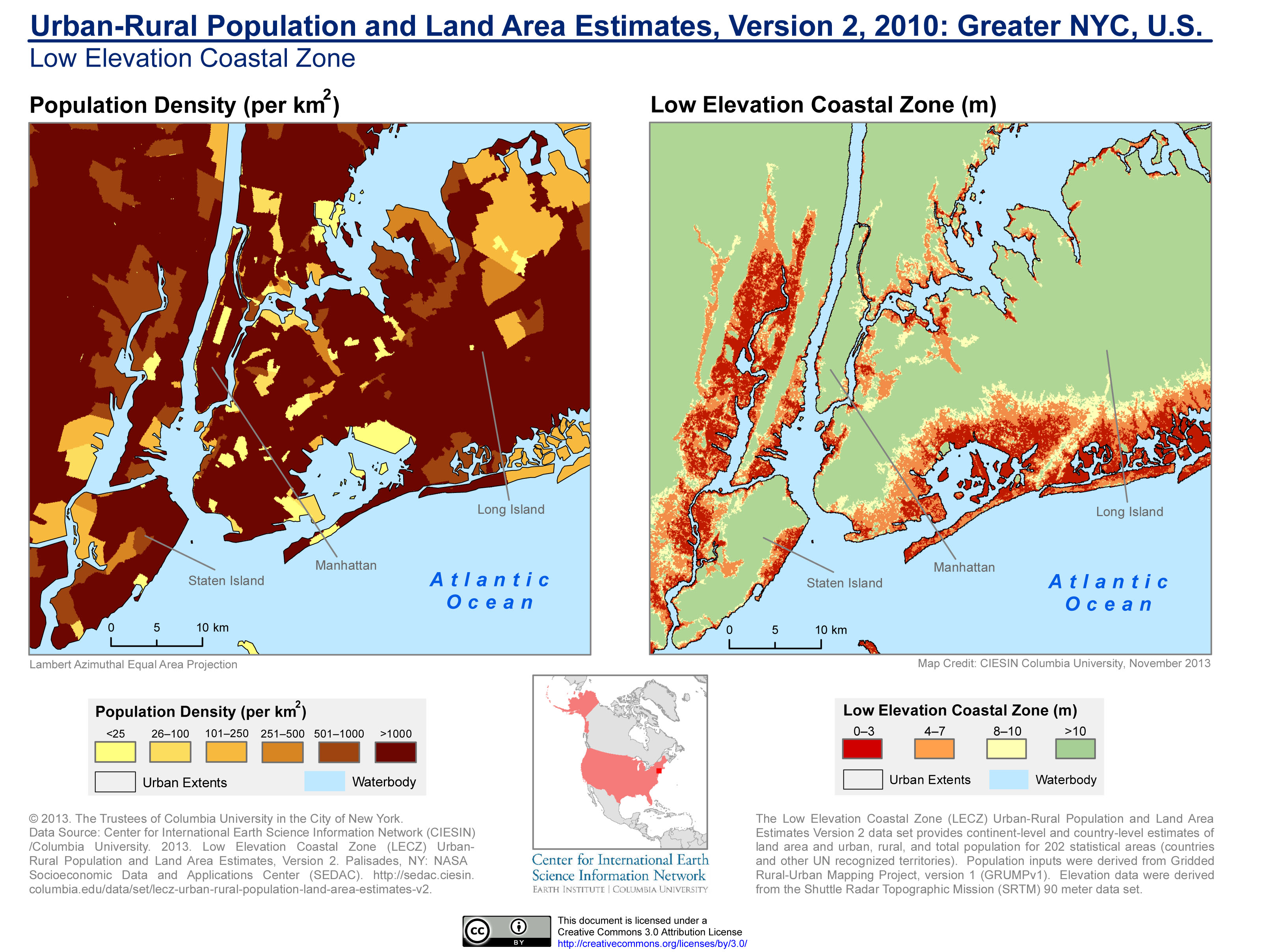
Population density and elevation above sea level in Greater NYC, U.S. (2010)

Climate change in New York City could affect buildings and infrastructure, wetlands, water supply, public health, and energy demand, due to the high population and extensive infrastructure in the region. As a seaport, New York is especially at risk from rising sea levels due to its many bridges and tunnels. Major aviation facilities in the New York metropolitan area, along with the New York Passenger Ship Terminal, are also located in areas vulnerable to flooding. Flooding would be costly to remediate. Tide gauge records indicate a rise in sea level of about 50 cm (20 inches) since 1860.

Rising temperatures could increase the risk of heat-related deaths during heat waves and increased concentrations of ground-level ozone (potentially causing asthma and other health concerns). The New York Times identified climate change as a contributing factor in the city's rising rat infestation, stating that "[m]ilder winters — the result of climate change — make it easier for rats to survive and reproduce".

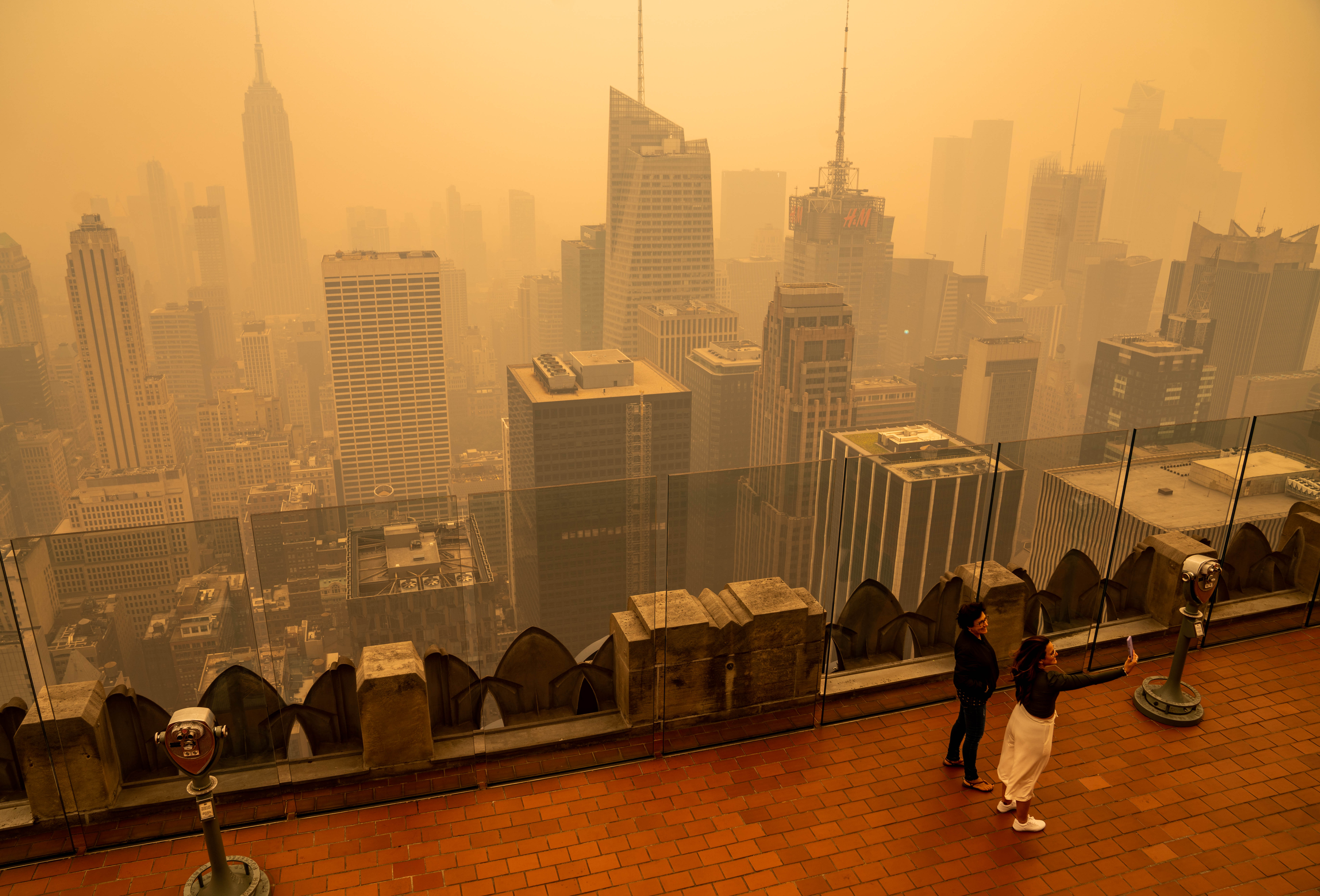
Wildfire smoke causing severe health risks in 2023.

In June 2019, New York City declared a climate emergency.

As of 2026, average temperatures are projected to increase in all seasons across all regions of New York State. Climate projections for New York City show some of the state's largest increase in extreme heat. For instance, New York City has historically experienced an average of 70 days below freezing, but by the middle of 2050s, New York City is projected to have anywhere from 31 to 48 days below freezing.

== Mitigation ==
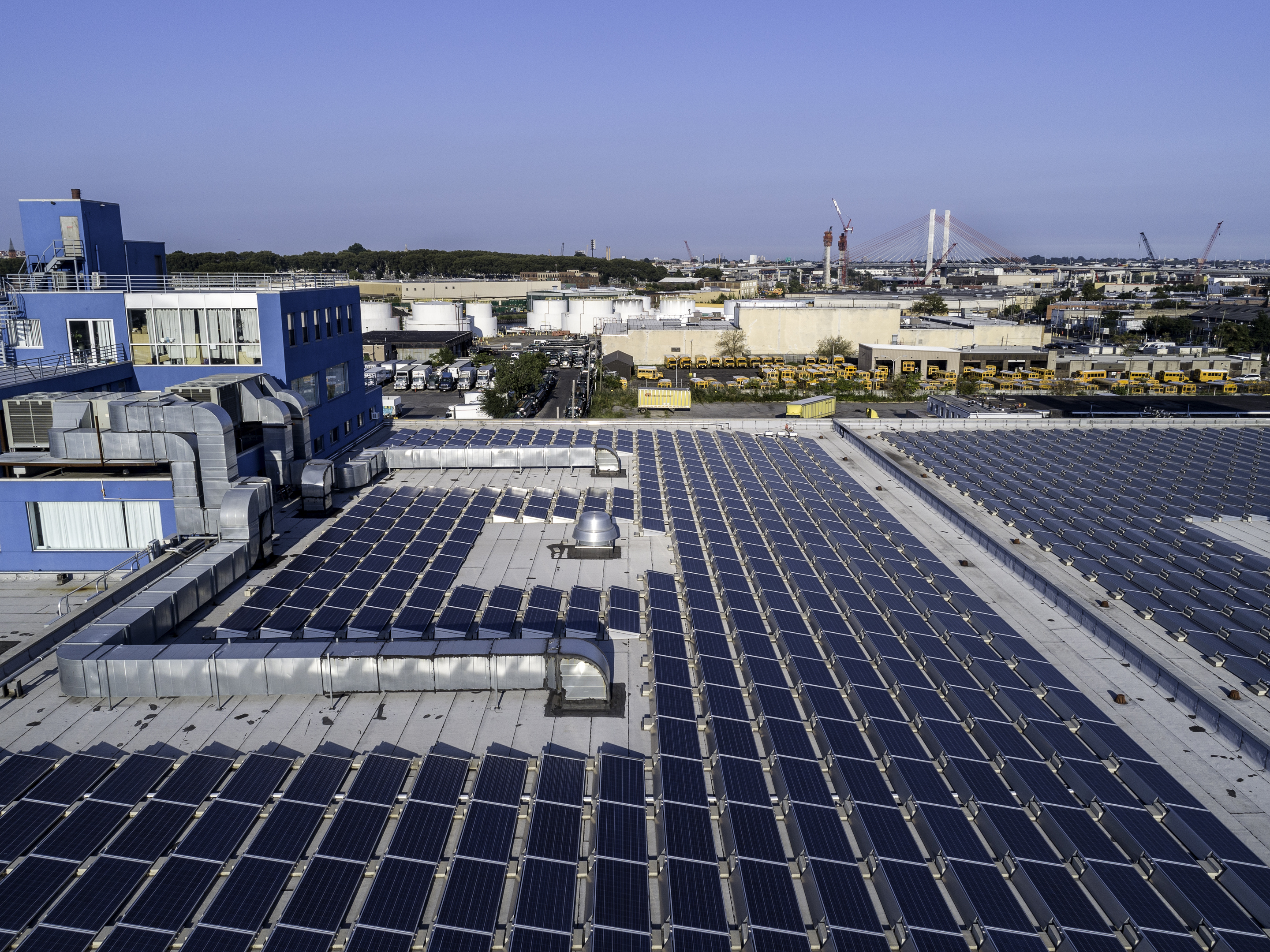
Solar installation, Brooklyn

The NYC Mayor's Office of Climate Policy and Programs, which also manages the OneNYC program, stated in 2018 that it was pledging to reduce greenhouse gas emissions by 80% by the year 2050 and align with the 1.5 degree Celsius target put into place under the Paris Agreement. Inroads have already begun, as the city's emissions have decreased 15% since 2005. The aim is to develop low-carbon transportation options and mandate retrofits to city buildings. In 2018, the team sued five companies (BP, Chevron, ConocoPhillips, Exxon Mobil, and Royal Dutch Shell) for being responsible for climate change, and divested the City's pension funds from fossil fuels, the first major US city to do so. Mayor Bill de Blasio supported the decision, stating "As climate change continues to worsen, it's up to the fossil fuel companies whose greed put us in this position to shoulder the costs of making New York City safer and more resilient."

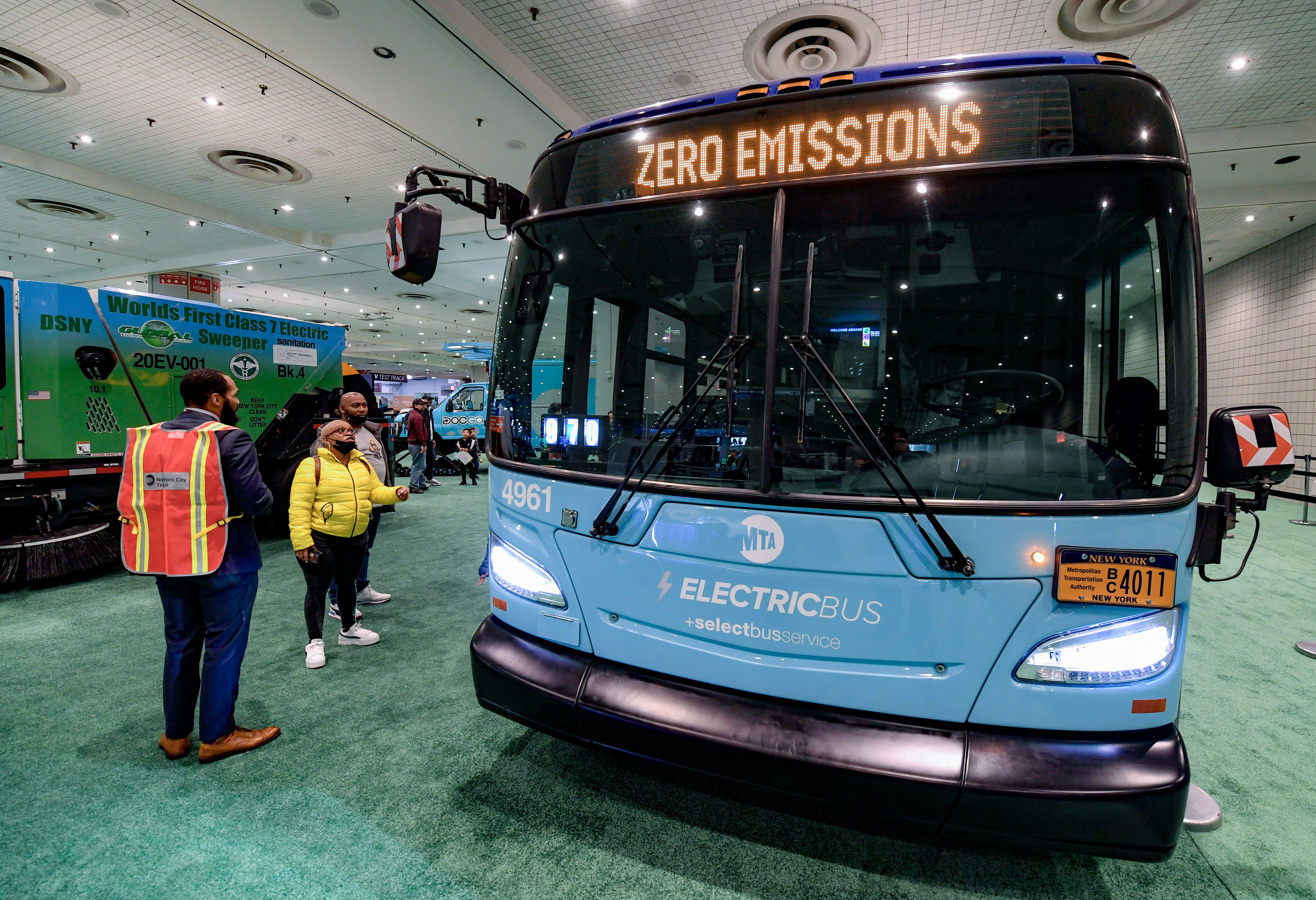
MTA electric bus, 2022

As of 2018, The OneNYC program made progress toward renewable energy reliance; for instance, solar installations have increased six-fold since 2014, $500 million was invested to improve building energy efficiency, and an additional $1 billion allocated to preserving NYC's drinking water. In an attempt to decrease the negative effects of climate change in New York City, the New York Climate Leadership and Community Protection Act (The Climate Act) mandated a 40 percent reduction of 1990 greenhouse gas emissions by 2030 and 80 percent by 2050. In addition, the Climate Action Council was established in order to monitor and control the climate change practices in the city.

=== Coastal flooding ===
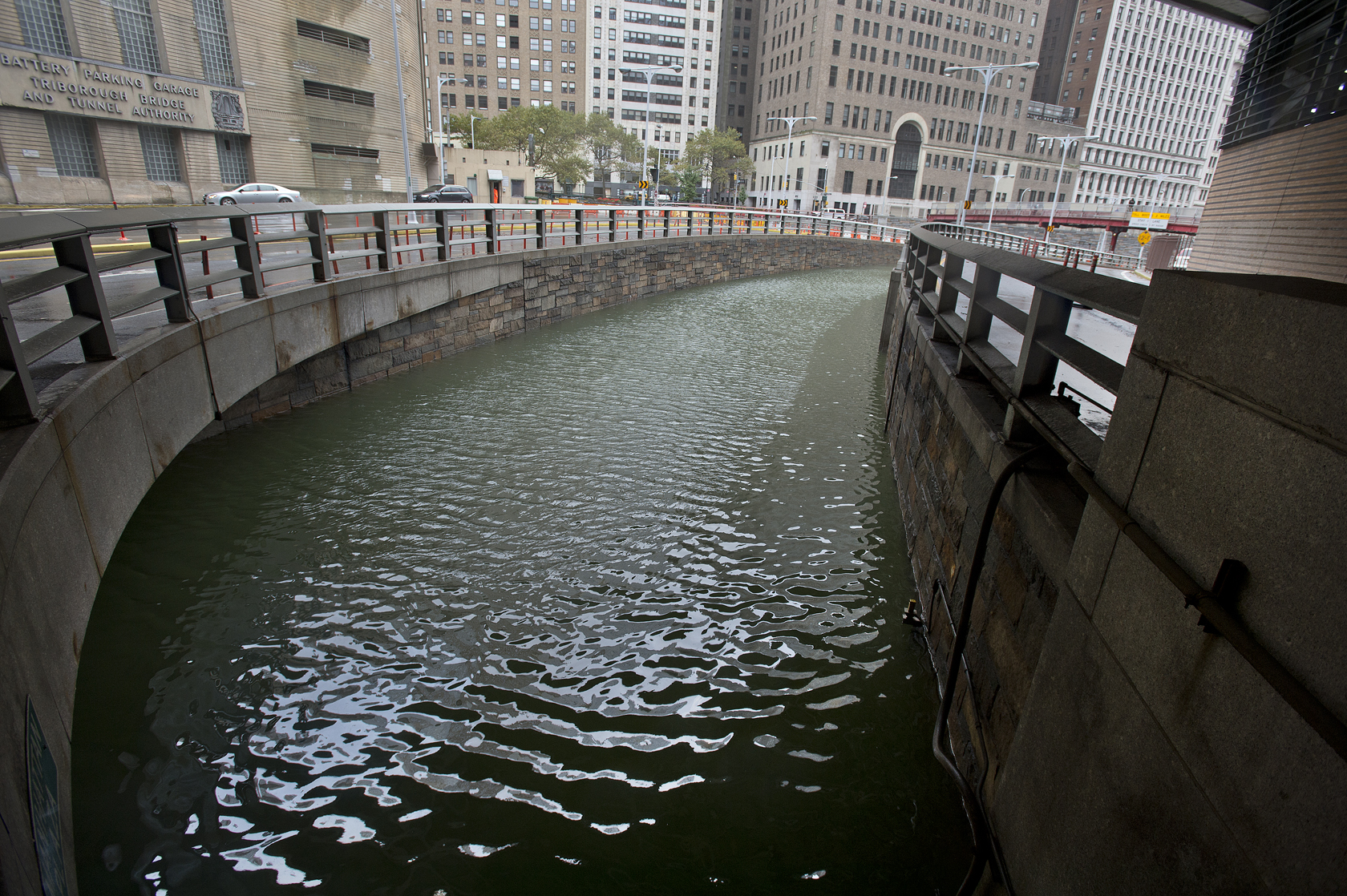
Flooding, Hugh L. Carey Tunnel during Hurricane Sandy

Flooding was the second-leading cause of weather-related fatalities in the United States in 2018. The projected 11-21 inches of sea level rise in New York City by 2050 and 4.17–9 feet by 2100 will compound the impacts of coastal flooding. The damage caused by Hurricane Sandy in 2012 served as an impetus for policymakers and residents to more seriously consider coastal resiliency efforts. Since then, regulations have been strengthened to better protect the 400,000 New Yorkers in the one percent annual chance floodplain. Additionally, in May 2017, New York Governor Andrew Cuomo announced the construction of a 5.3 mile seawall along the Staten Island coastline capable of withstanding coastal flooding up to 15.6 feet - two feet higher than the surge caused by Hurricane Sandy. When completed, the seawall will reduce damages by approximately $30 million.

Coastal flooding is an issue that significantly affects racially and financially marginalized individuals living in Queens and Southern Brooklyn because their housing is older and less resilient. Additionally, elderly New Yorkers struggling with coastal flooding have limited mobility, which causes difficulties.

== Adaptation ==
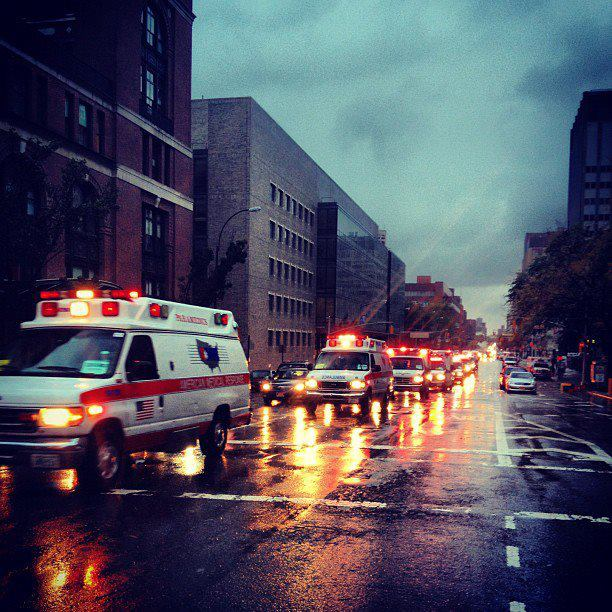
Ambulances deployed during Hurricane Sandy.

In 2009, New York City launched a task force to advise on preparing city infrastructure for flooding, water shortages, and higher temperatures. The New York City water supply system was built to meet the city's water needs. The NYC Mayor's Office of Climate Policy and Programs is investing $20 billion to adapt the city's neighborhoods to climate change threats such as flooding, extreme heat, and sea level rise.

The Lower Manhattan Coastal Resiliency initiative aims to address flooding and climate-related threats to the Financial District and surrounding neighborhoods. The Financial District and Seaport Climate Resilience Master Plan focuses on making the waterfront more resilient to severe coastal storms and flooding due to rising sea levels by creating a multilevel waterfront on Lower Manhattan's shoreline.

In 2019, the city allocated $615 million for a 5.1 mile East Shore Seawall - a combined seawall and walkway on Staten Island - officially called the Staten Island Multi-Use Elevated Promenade.

NYC has employed two strategies to be able to adapt to climate change. The first strategy is to reduce GHG (greenhouse gas) emissions, second is to help the economy, neighborhoods, and public transportation adapt towards climate change. Since 2005 the GHG emissions have been lowered by 19% and is planned to be lowered to 30% by 2030. Its plan is to have GHG emissions lowered by 80% as soon as 2050. This was done due to improving utility operations and replacing coal and oil with natural gases for the generation of electricity.

== Influences on New York City climate change ==
The Emergency Planning and Community Right-to-Know Act of 1986 is intended to protect citizens against industrial toxic pollution. This information is available in order to keep track of increasing toxin releases and identify high toxic-releasing companies. Once these records are publicly released, individuals have the freedom to respond to that information however they please. If a shareholder of a specific facility is discouraged by the facility's amount of toxin releases, that person may choose to remove themselves as a shareholder. This is why is it important to minimize underreporting or overreporting of toxic emissions. Although this information is available to the public, New York seems to continue to struggle with keeping carbon emissions low. According to the NYC Mayor's Office of Sustainability, New York City generates 14 million tons of waste and recyclables annually at a cost of $300 million for residential waste alone.

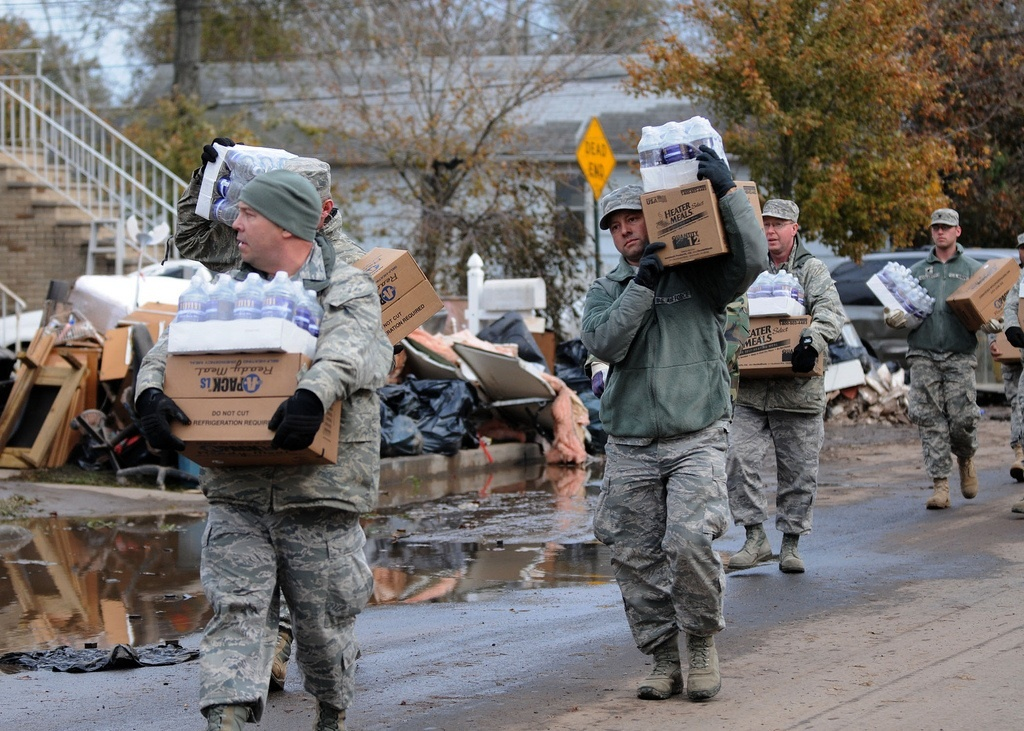
National Guard response to Hurricane Sandy, Staten Island.

Scorecard has documented that the risk of cancer from New York County hazardous air pollutants in each category was almost always the same for each side of the spectrum (kids below poverty and kids above poverty, for example). The information also shows that the lower-income and minority groups emit a greater percentage of toxins and pollutants than others. Toxic disposal and storage facilities (TDSF) are built in low-income areas with lower-valued homes because those residing there are less likely to have the purchasing and political power to fight against it, unlike those living in high-income communities. This means that they will not have the means to make a change against this, so TSDF's are often built in low-income communities with lower-valued houses. Even so, the 2010 New York State Hazardous Waste Facility Siting Plan states that the number of commercial TSD facilities in New York have declined over time with 30 commercial TSD facilities in 1988 and 13 commercial TSD facilities in 2008. This is a positive and negative accomplishment, because there are fewer TSDF's in general, but there are increased usage and pollution emission levels at the few TSDF's that are available.

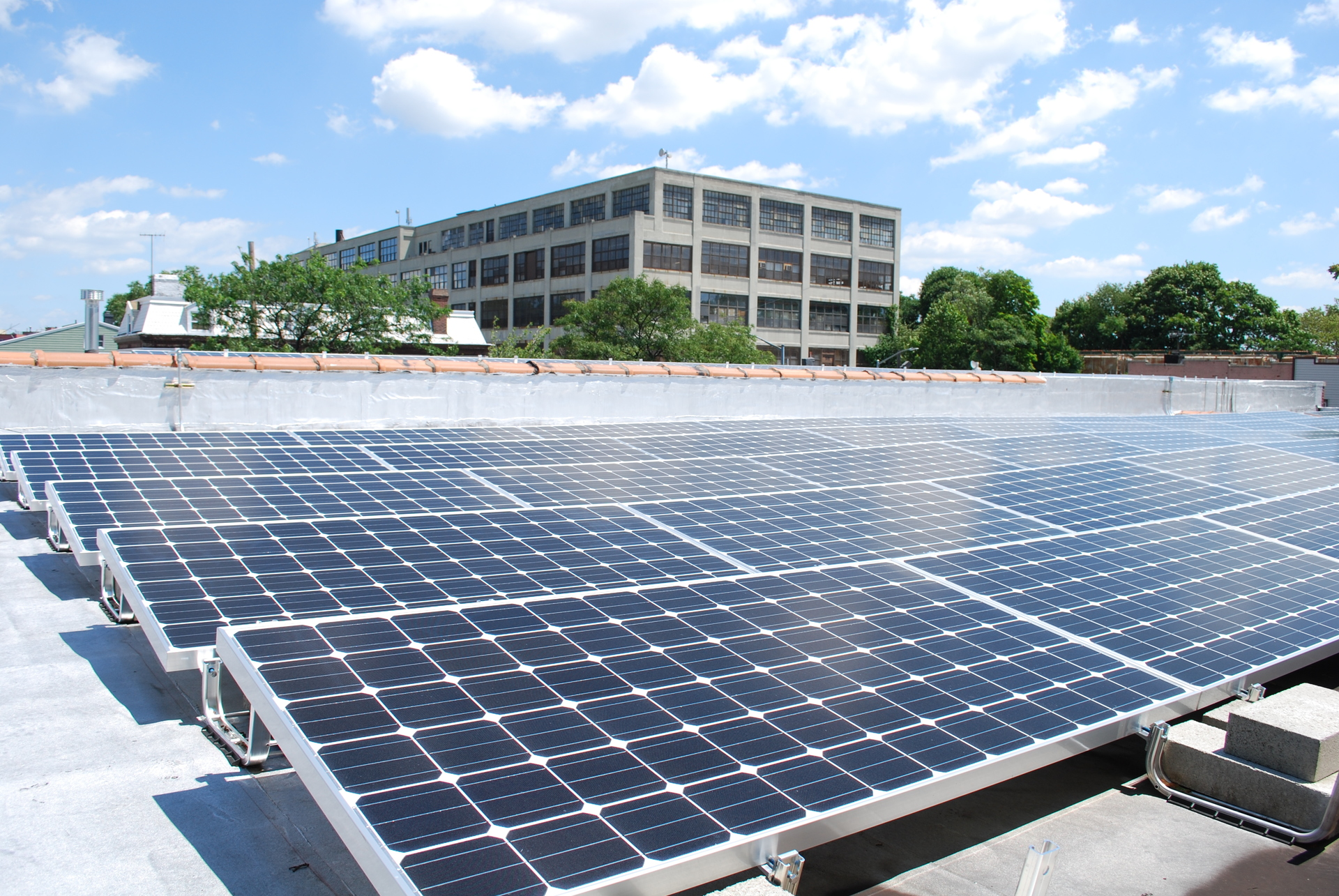
Solar rooftop, Queens

The 2010 New York State Hazardous Waste Facility Siting Plan also presents important information when evaluating the TSDF's in each county. Chapter 1 of the siting plan states that ten-day transfer stations, generators that store for less than 90 days, facilities or locations for collecting household hazardous wastes, facilities for collecting non-manifested waste such as universal waste, sanitary landfills, and trucks are not included as TSD facilities in the detailed analyses included in the plan. This shows that not all hazardous waste facilities are taken into consideration when examining the eligibility of a county for building more facilities. Omitting such facilities from the analyses presents inaccurate calculations and assumptions. Those facilities still emit pollution and wastes, regardless of the size of facility or time-length of the waste transfer.

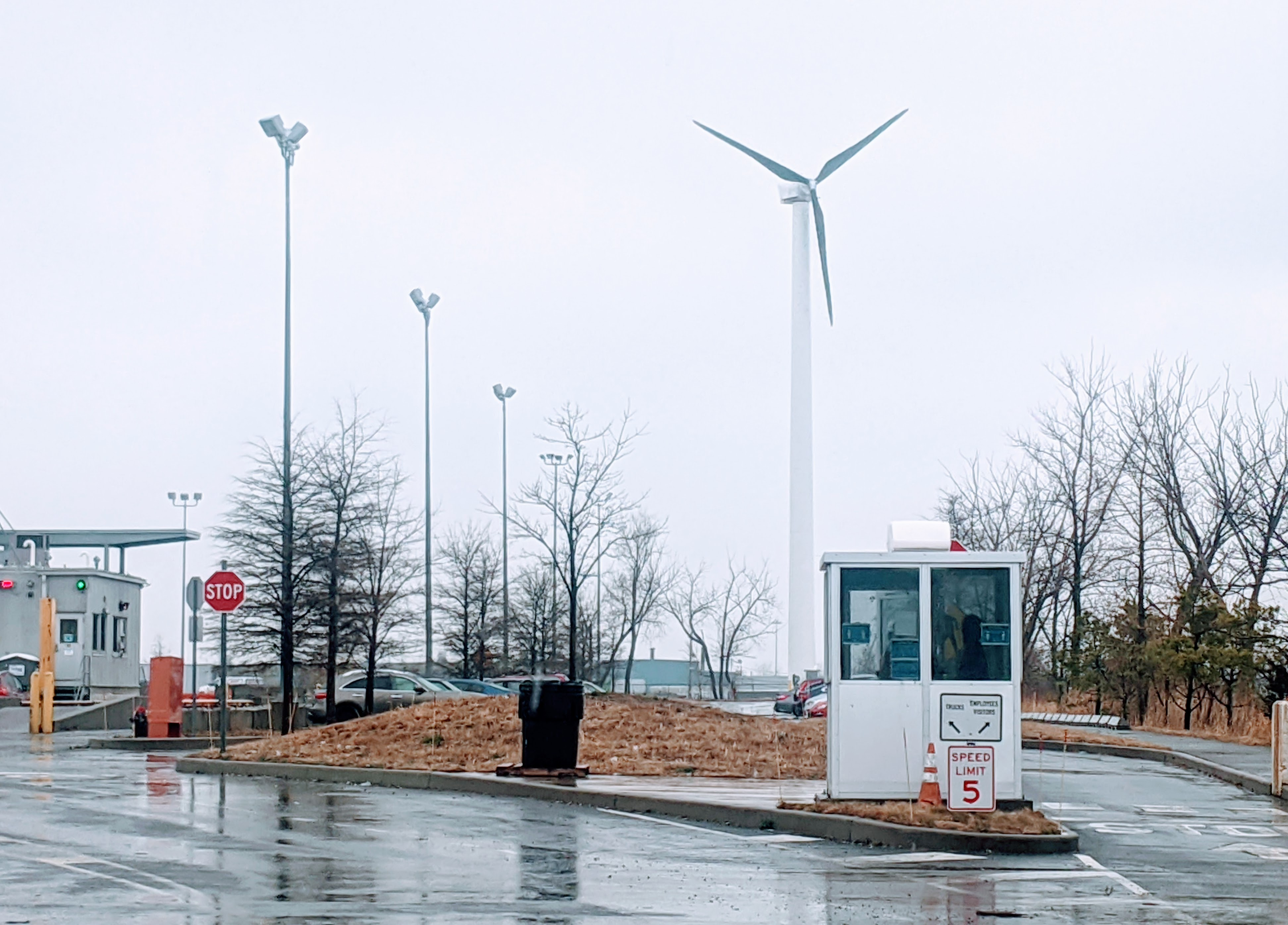
Wind turbine, South Brooklyn Marine Terminal.

Someone who lives in a single-family houses emits more toxic chemicals into the environment than someone who lives in multifamily buildings, since detached houses use more energy. Many people rely on public transit in New York City because it is cheaper and easier than using a car. This intense use of the public transit system decreases those people's carbon emissions. The Scorecard analysis states that New York experiences only 45% of days with good air quality in a year and 1% of days with unhealthful air quality. Because of this, New York ranked among the 10% dirtiest/worst of all counties in the United States in 2003.

In regards to air quality management, the Mayor's Office of Sustainability states that “the City has implemented a policy to reduce, replace, retrofit and refuel City vehicles. In 2014, the City reduced its fleet by at least 5 percent and expanded the use of biodiesel. Additionally, 400 vehicles were upgraded through the Congestion Mitigation and Air Quality (CMAQ) and other funding sources, and Diesel Particulate Filters (DPFs) were installed on 685 buses in 2014”.

== Minority neighborhoods struggling with climate change ==
In recent years, climate change has not only affected New York City's environment but it has begun affecting its occupants as well. Minority groups living in areas such as the South Bronx and Brooklyn have faced severe repercussions due to climate change. Specifically, these minority groups face industrial pollution, congestion, areas with little to no trees, extreme heat, and flooding.

The occupants of the South Bronx face extreme heat due to the rise of climate change. It has affected citizens especially those diagnosed with asthma. With the majority of the Bronx population being Black or Hispanic living below the poverty level about 6% of them develop asthma. They faced serious risks especially during this recent summer. According to data, about 86% of those who died from extreme heat had a chronic illness and in areas not only in the Bronx, each year the extreme heat is said to cause about 370 deaths.

Areas in Brooklyn, specifically Red Hook, deal with a lack of trees and industrial pollution. The loss of over 300 trees has caused a lack of breathable air and air filtration. It is said that several warehouses are being built in Red Hook, Brooklyn. One of them is going to be larger than a million square feet. This would bring more than 1,300 trucks to the neighborhood in addition to the 1,000 trucks that are already there. This would cause an increase in air pollution, harming the well being of its residents.

== Extreme Events ==
(Effects of Extreme Drought and Climate Change)

Certain effects of climate change in New York City threaten the city as dangerous storms and events are soon to come. Increasing air, and Great Lake temperatures can create conditions that favor the formation of stronger storms such as hurricanes, tropical storms, lake effect storms, and nor'easters. New York State is projected to have a higher frequency of late-summer, short-term droughts. Droughts can impact agricultural output and lead to reduce water availability, diminish water quality, and wildfires due to dry conditions. Other extreme events such as wildfires can produce particulate air pollution that can travel to other locations and pose a hazard to human health, as seen during June 2023 when smoke from the Canadian wildfires reached NY.

== In media ==
New York 2140 is a 2017 climate fiction novel set in New York City by American science fiction author Kim Stanley Robinson. The 1973 science fiction movie Soylent Green, starring Charlton Heston, takes place in a climate-ravaged New York City in a now-alternate 2022. New York is depicted as over capacity with 40,000,000 citizens in cramped, sweltering conditions day and night, while the few wealthy residents live in air conditioned, spacious apartments. The effects of climate change are omnipresent throughout the film as characters are almost always drenched in sweat. The long-term effects of climate change are crucial to the film’s gradual revelation that the miracle food of Soylent Green, which had been claimed by the Soylent Corporation to be made of phytoplankton, is instead made out of human remains, as runaway global warming has begun to kill off the remnants of life in the ocean.

== See also ==
- New York Harbor Storm-Surge Barrier
- Climate change in the United States
- Climate change in New York (state)
- Climate change and cities
- Plug-in electric vehicles in New York (state) § New York City
