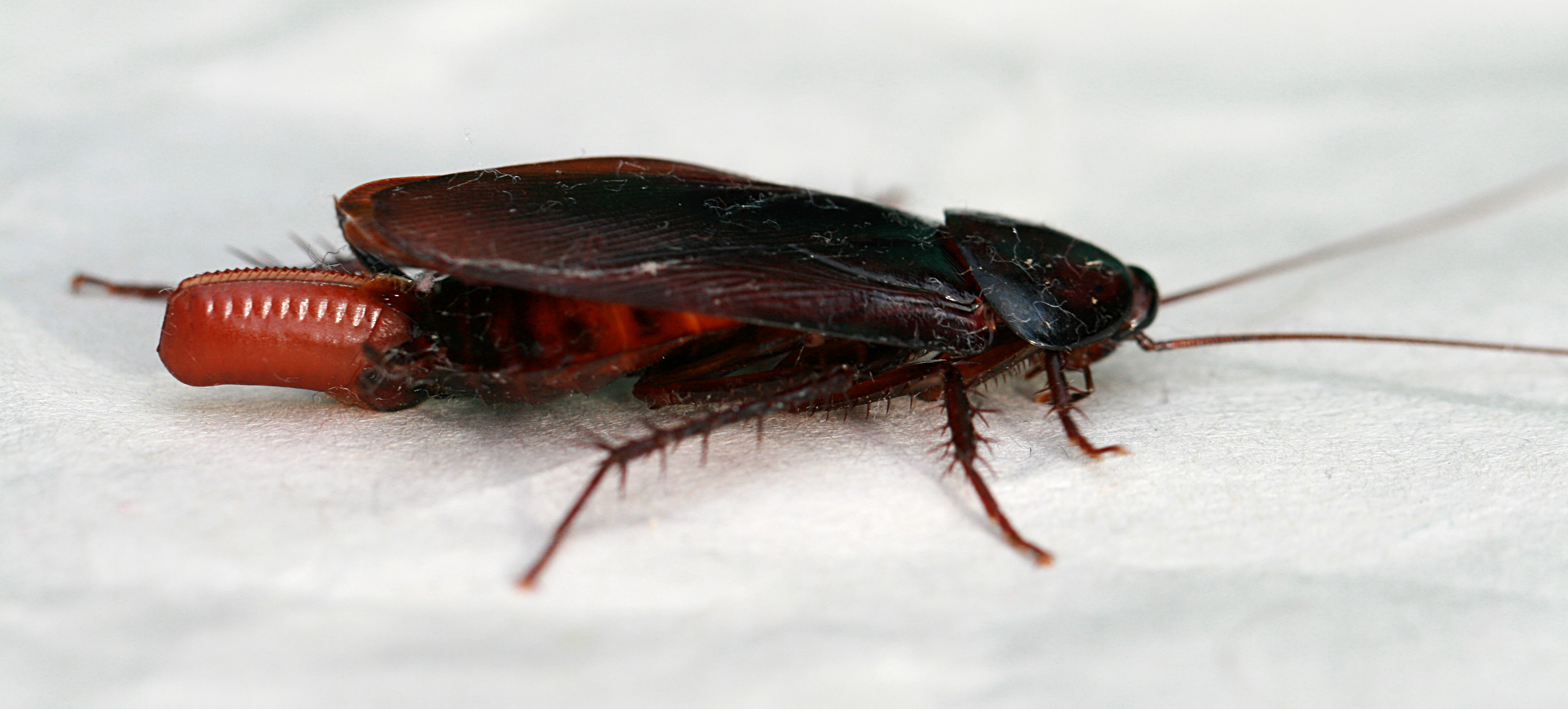
- laying an egg case (ootheca)

Scientific classification
- Kingdom: Animalia
- Phylum: Arthropoda
- Clade: Pancrustacea
- Class: Insecta
- Order: Blattodea
- Family: Blattidae
- Genus: Validiblatta
- Species: V. fuliginosa

Binomial name
- Validiblatta fuliginosa (Serville, 1839)

Synonyms
- Kakerlac fuliginosa Serville, 1839; Periplaneta picea Shiraki, 1906; Periplaneta emarginata Karny, 1908; Periplaneta filchnerae Karny, 1908

= Smokybrown cockroach =

Species of cockroach

The smokybrown cockroach (Validiblatta fuliginosa), synonym Periplaneta fuliginosa, is a species of cockroach in the family Blattidae. It is a large, winged species, growing to a length of 32–35 millimetres (1.3–1.4 in).

== Characteristics ==
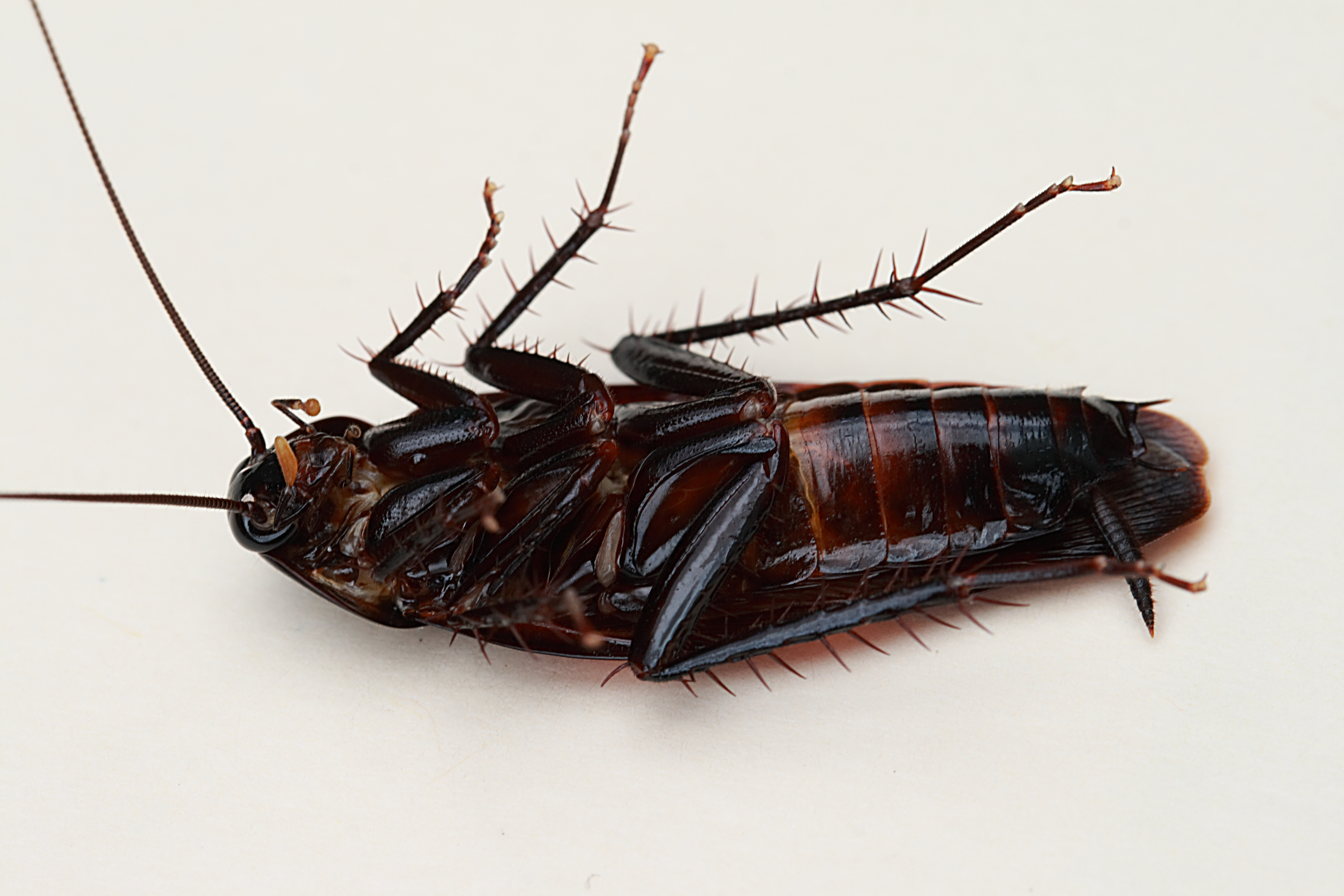
The ventral side of V. fuliginosa

Although not closely related to the American cockroach (Periplaneta americana), the smokybrown cockroach is sometimes confused with it, but readily distinguishable from it by its uniformly light to dark brown–mahogany coloration. Furthermore, unlike P. americana, which possesses a light-rimmed pattern on its thorax, the smokybrown cockroach's thorax is dark and shiny.

== Diet ==
The smokybrown cockroach is a detritivore and can feed off a wide array of organic (including decaying) matter. Like most cockroaches, it is a scavenger, whereby it feeds on many different types of foods including dry earthworms, pet food, pet waste such as feces and urine, paper, and many types of ripe fruits.

== Habitat and distribution ==
The smokybrown cockroach is very common in Japan, as well as the southern United States and tropical climates; notably, it can be found in Florida, Eastern North Carolina, Louisiana, Mississippi, Texas, and other Gulf coastal states, and along the southern Mississippi River. The cockroach can also be found in Australia, such as in warmer cities like Sydney and Brisbane. Most notably in South America, these cockroaches are seen in Argentina to Paraguay geographical range. The cockroach has also been recently reported in Asia, Europe, Australia, and Northern America.

The smokybrown cockroach prefers warmer climates and is not cold-tolerant. It may, however, be able to survive colder climates by going indoors. It often lives around the perimeter of buildings especially places where these insects can feed and confine themselves.

== Behavior and adaptations ==
The smokybrown cockroach may come indoors during daylight hours to look for food and even to live; generally, however, in warm weather, it will move outdoors. They tend to lose moisture twice as fast as P. americana, therefore requiring environmental conditions with constant moisture to avoid drying out. Their activity patterns are mostly restricted to evening hours when humidity is highest. The movement to and from shelters is greatest when temperatures exceed 20 °C (68 °F) and often becomes less when temperatures are lower than 20 °C (68 °F). Since adults are less susceptible than nymphs to the effects of higher temperatures, adults are more often found away from the perimeters of the house. Often during reproductive periods, females ready for egg dispersal infest homes to protect their offspring and find a convenient place to oviposit. This adaptation is advantageous to these cockroaches, as egg production often becomes limited when temperatures reach 15 °C (59 °F).

== Reproduction ==
=== Oviposition ===
V. fuliginosa can reproduce through sexual reproduction and in some cases through parthenogenesis, which is a form of asexual reproduction. In cases where females do not have access to mates, females reproduce by parthenogenesis, however, this form of reproduction is not as commonly seen as sexual reproduction. Females can oviposit an average of 10 or more oothecae in favorable environments, but this is highly dependent on the cockroaches' body fat, thereby as her body mass decreases fewer ootheca are oviposited in a season. The oothecae, dark brown color, commonly ranges from 11–14 millimetres (0.43–0.55 in) in length. On average female cockroaches without mates live longer, than females with a mate. In a study done, it was found that on average adult females lived 117–174 days, whereas females without a mate lived to 131–236 days after reaching adulthood. The higher energy costs associated with oogenesis and the prevalence of oviposition point to a shorter lifespan. Furthermore, an extended oviposition period occurs, as a result, fewer eggs are formed. Sexual reproduction also leads to lower instances of oothecae defects without the presence of eggs compared to reproducing asexually.

=== Mating behaviour ===
Females release volatile sex pheromones stimulating the mating behavior of V. fuliginosa males, which receive the chemical signals through sensory receptors located on their antennae. These pheromones are made up of synthetic Periplanone-D, which is a major sex excitatory component of the pheromone chemical composition. In addition, the males often participate in perching, whereby their body conformation includes a pointing downward of the head, forelegs extended, as their antennae become aligned 45° from their vertical position. Whereby, in female mate calling the cockroaches' body is up high, the dorsal end of the abdomen bend towards the ground, and wings are held at a 45° angle. These male cockroaches allocate significantly more time and energy to mating behaviors than females as the production of female pheromones is costly. Moreover, spending 20% of their time perching, whereby in retrospect females only spend 8% of their time mate calling.

== Morphology ==
=== Cuticle physiology ===
Temperature and levels of humidity are factors that greatly influence the smokybrown cockroaches' cuticular water loss, therefore these insects are attracted to highly humid areas to reduce the permeability of their cuticle. The amount of lipid composition of the cockroach also directly correlates to lower body transpiration, in addition, but provides these species with a more water barrier easing the permeability of the cuticle. Therefore, as the water levels drop from sun exposure, the circulation of materials in the blood is also slowly diminishing. Over time even when restricted to certain habitats due to the physiology of their cuticle, they are able to acclimatize through homeostasis seen by decreased salivary gland production. V. fuliginosa are able to upkeep homeostasis in fluctuating moisture regions by changing their drinking habits, and the water flow rate of fecal matter, as well as cuticle transpiration. The cuticle is made up of many layers where much secretion is stored between the various plates. These thick layers have various glandular cells, along with pores that connect through the cuticle to secrete the sticky protein substance. The secretions of the hypodermal layer play a role in the nymph male defenses towards adult cockroaches.

== Ecological impact ==
=== Pest status ===
V. fuliginosa are considered pests in many geographical areas around the world, including the Southern United States and Japan, as they are very effective at invading urban homes, restaurants, hospitals, and many other crowded places. With their rapid invasion into homes, they are known as sanitary pests and have adapted to toxic bait traps which are no longer effective at eradicating these species.

=== Impact to humans ===
These species can be detrimental to human health, thereby due to their proximity of inhabitance to humans they are a vector for diseases including parasitism of nematodes. They are harmful due to their ability to feed on fecal matter, which transmits parasites and many diseases. The parasitic nematode, Leidynema appendiculata, is known to parasitize the smokybrown cockroach, in which they invade and live in the cockroach's gut. The eggs of the nematode are passed through the cockroach's feces and spread to other hosts by cockroaches eating the excrement. The invasion of homes by these cockroaches greatly increases the prevalence of asthma, pathogen exposure, and allergens seen. Exposure to the cockroach's feces, the shed outer layer of the exoskeleton, and other body parts mainly cause the transfer of parasites and allergens. In addition, human exposure to these parasitic nematodes can cause conditions such as colitis, and infections of the female reproductive tract.

=== Management practices ===
One of the control measures to avoid these inhabitants is the use of insecticides, thereby spraying around the exterior of the house with a 3-metre (9.8 ft)-wide barrier. In addition, it has also been suggested to use these insecticides every month in the cracks, around windows, and any other accessible entry points for these, cockroaches to enter. New insights have been set in using virus technology to control the smokybrown cockroach. The use of the densovirus is an interesting technology to use as many methods are ill-equipped to minimize the impacts of the smokybrown cockroach as they can change their sensory behavior to insecticides over time. In a study done, when V. fuliginosa are exposed to the artificially extracted densovirus from a diseased cockroach, high mortality occurred with exposure to low doses. The use of a biocontrol agent rather than insecticides is more advantageous as it is safer for humans and other organisms indirectly affected, additionally, targets V. fuliginosa directly.

== Additional images ==
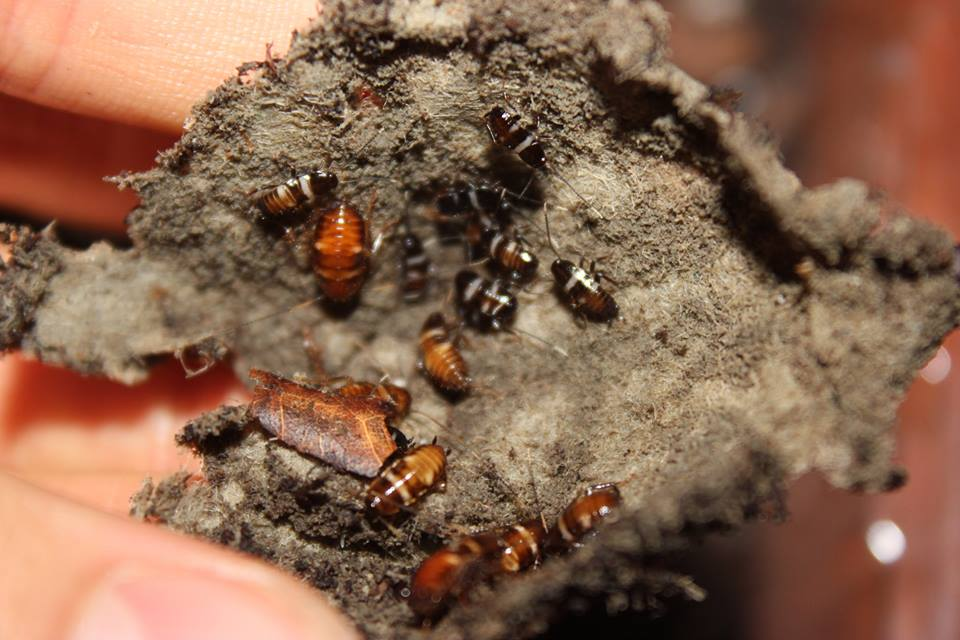
Young instar nymphs
