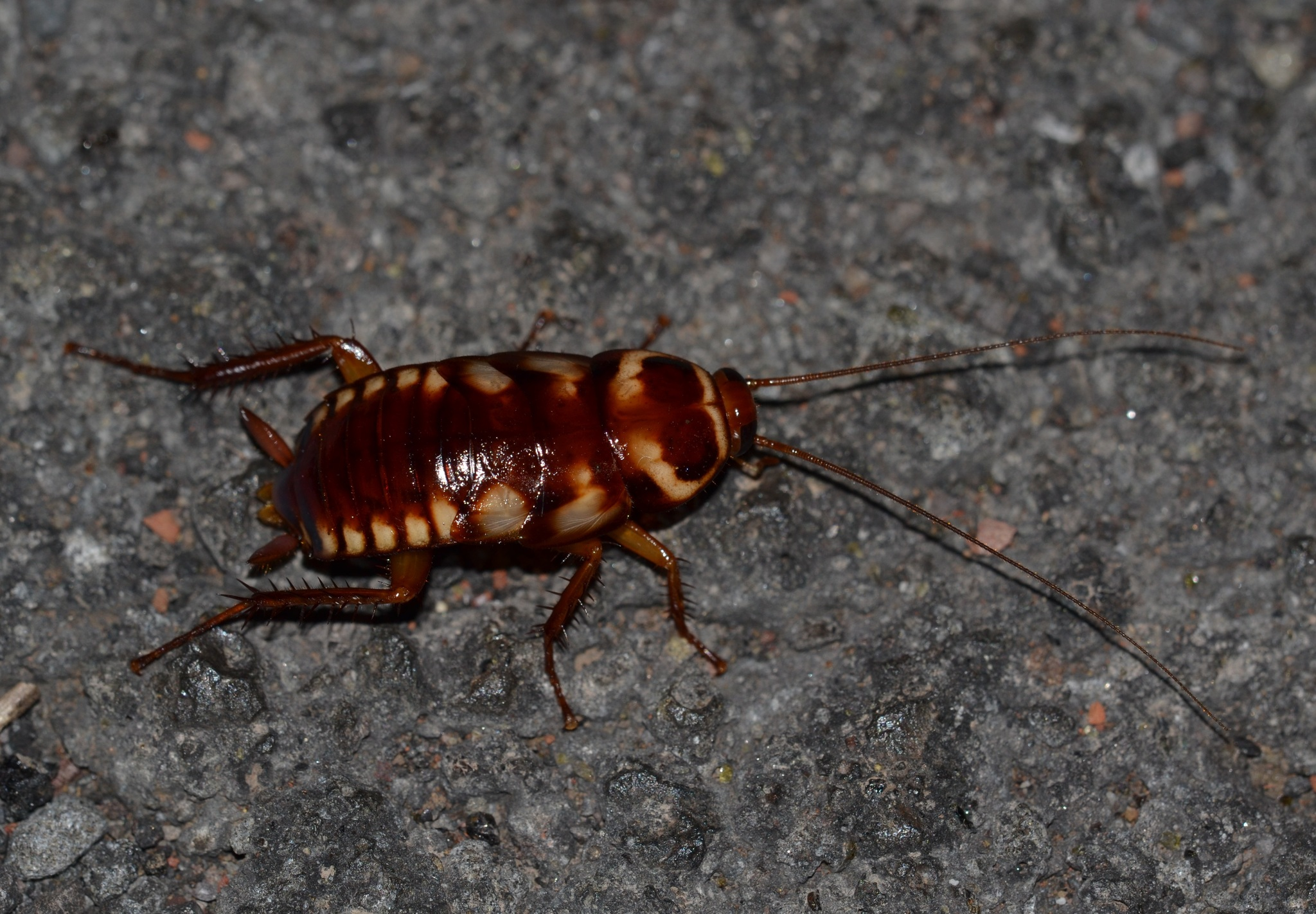
- Australian cockroach top view on stone

Scientific classification
- Kingdom: Animalia
- Phylum: Arthropoda
- Clade: Pancrustacea
- Class: Insecta
- Order: Blattodea
- Family: Blattidae
- Genus: Validiblatta
- Species: V. australasiae

Binomial name
- Validiblatta australasiae (Fabricius, 1775)

Synonyms
- Blatta australasiae Fabricius, 1775; Blatta domingensis Palisot de Beauvois, 1805; Blatta aurantiaca Stoll, 1813; Periplaneta zonata Haan, 1842; Periplaneta inclusa Walker, F., 1868; Periplaneta repanda Walker, F., 1868; Periplaneta subcincta Walker, F., 1868; Periplaneta emittens Walker, F., 1871; Polyzosteria subornata Walker, F., 1871

= Australian cockroach =

Species of cockroach

The Australian cockroach (Validiblatta australasiae), synonym Periplaneta australasiae, is a species of cockroach in the family Blattidae. It is a common species of tropical cockroach, with a length of 23–35 mm (0.91–1.38 in). It is brown overall, with the tegmina having a conspicuous lateral pale stripe or margin, and the pronotum (head shield) with a sharply contrasting pale or yellow margin. It is very similar in appearance to the American cockroach and may be easily mistaken for it. It is, however, slightly smaller than the American cockroach, and has a yellow margin on the thorax and yellow streaks at its sides near the wing base.

== Distribution ==
Despite its name, the Australian cockroach is a cosmopolitan species, and an introduced species in Australia. V. australasiae probably originated in Africa. It is very common in the southern United States and in tropical climates, and can be found in many locations throughout the world due to its travels by shipping and commerce between locations.

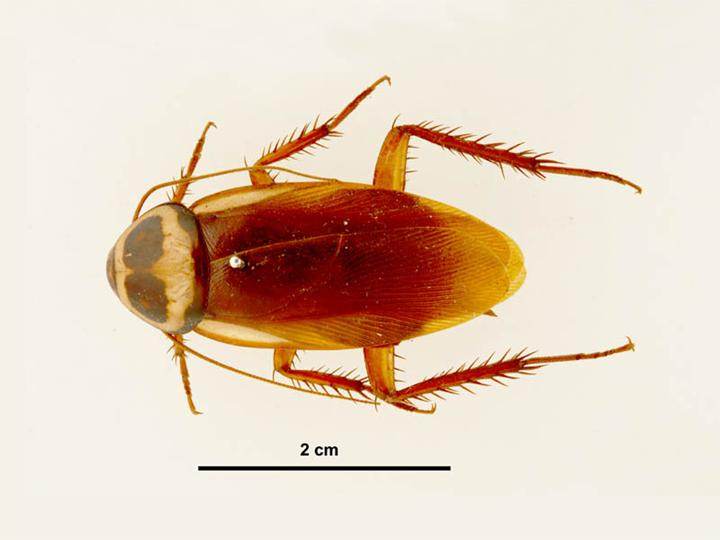
Top view

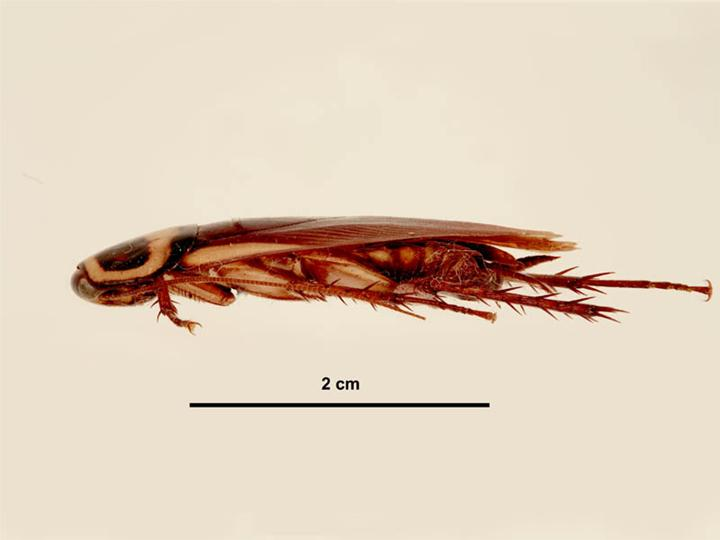
Lateral view

== Habitat ==
It prefers warmer climates and is not cold-tolerant, but it may be able to survive indoors in colder climates. It does well in moist conditions, but also can tolerate dry conditions as long as water is available. It often lives around the perimeter of buildings. It appears to prefer eating plants more than its relatives do, but can feed on a wide array of organic (including decaying) matter. Like most cockroaches, it is a scavenger.

It may come indoors to look for food and even to live, but in warm weather, it may move outdoors and enter buildings looking for food. This species can be found in nature in tropical parts of Australia; it has also been found along the east coast of Australia, from Cape York to the Victorian border.
