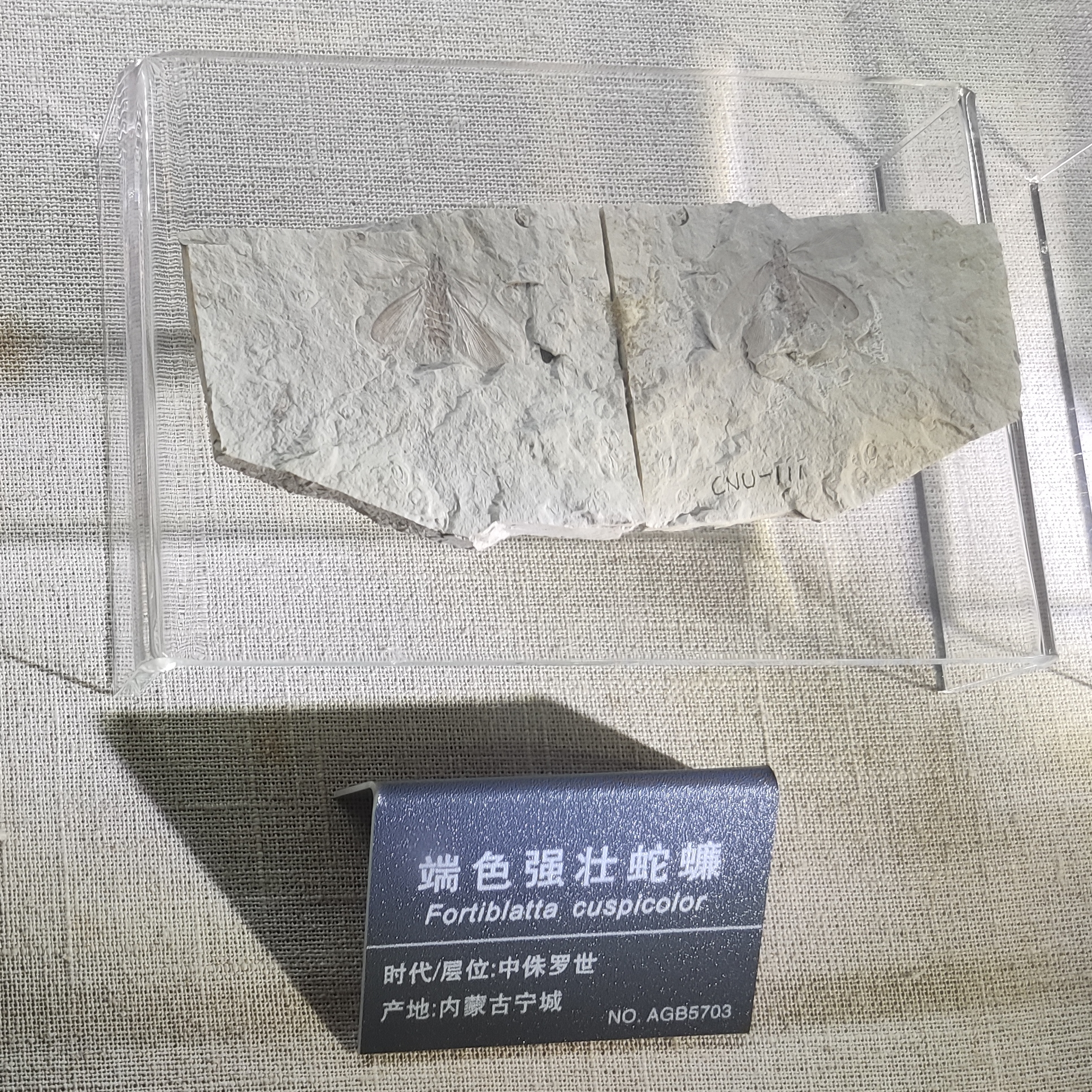

Scientific classification
- Kingdom: Animalia
- Phylum: Arthropoda
- Clade: Pancrustacea
- Class: Insecta
- Order: Blattodea
- Family: †Raphidiomimidae
- Genus: †Fortiblatta; Liang et al., 2009
- Species: †F. cuspicolor

Binomial name
- †Fortiblatta cuspicolor Liang et al., 2009

= Fortiblatta =

Extinct genus of cockroaches

Fortiblatta is an extinct genus of roaches in the family Raphidiomimidae, containing a single species, Fortiblatta cuspicolor.
