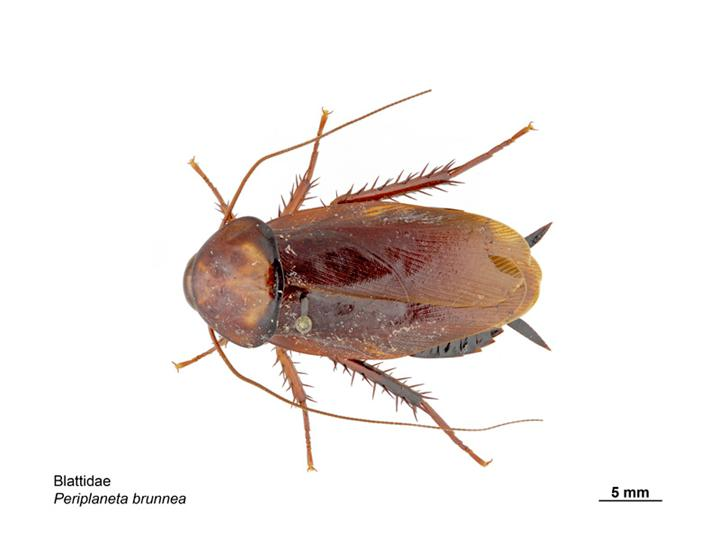

Scientific classification
- Kingdom: Animalia
- Phylum: Arthropoda
- Clade: Pancrustacea
- Class: Insecta
- Order: Blattodea
- Family: Blattidae
- Genus: Validiblatta
- Species: V. brunnea

Binomial name
- Validiblatta brunnea {Burmeister, 1838)

Synonyms
- Periplaneta brunnea Burmeister, 1838; Periplaneta concolor Walker, 1868; Periplaneta patens Walker, 1868; Periplaneta truncata Krauss, 1892; Periplaneta ignota Shaw, 1925

= Brown cockroach =

Species of cockroach

The brown cockroach (Validiblatta brunnea), synonym Periplaneta brunnea, is a species of cockroach in the family Blattidae. It is probably originally native to Africa, but today it has a circumtropical distribution, having been widely introduced. In cooler climates it can only survive indoors, and it is considered a household pest.

== Appearance ==
This cockroach is similar in appearance to the American cockroach (Periplaneta americana), but darker in color and with thicker, wider, triangular cerci. This species is a reddish-brown color and has fully developed wings. It reaches up to 4 centimeters in length.

== Ecology ==
Brown cockroaches are omnivores and give off unpleasant smells when threatened or touched. Males are usually smaller than their female counterparts. They are social insects and like to be in large groups, resting in warm, moist, dark areas. This species prefers indoor areas and are often known as the pests that linger around homes. This contrasts with the habits of American cockroaches, which prefer to live in outdoor areas like the sewers on the streets, and only come into homes when there are changes in the weather climate or when food is limited.

== Reproduction ==
Brown cockroaches produce an ootheca about 1.2 to 1.6 centimeters long, containing about 24 eggs on average. It is longer compared to the American cockroach, one ootheca of which contains around 28 eggs on average.

== Distribution ==
This species has a cosmopolitan distribution, present on all continents except Antarctica.
