= Plug-in electric vehicles in New York (state) =

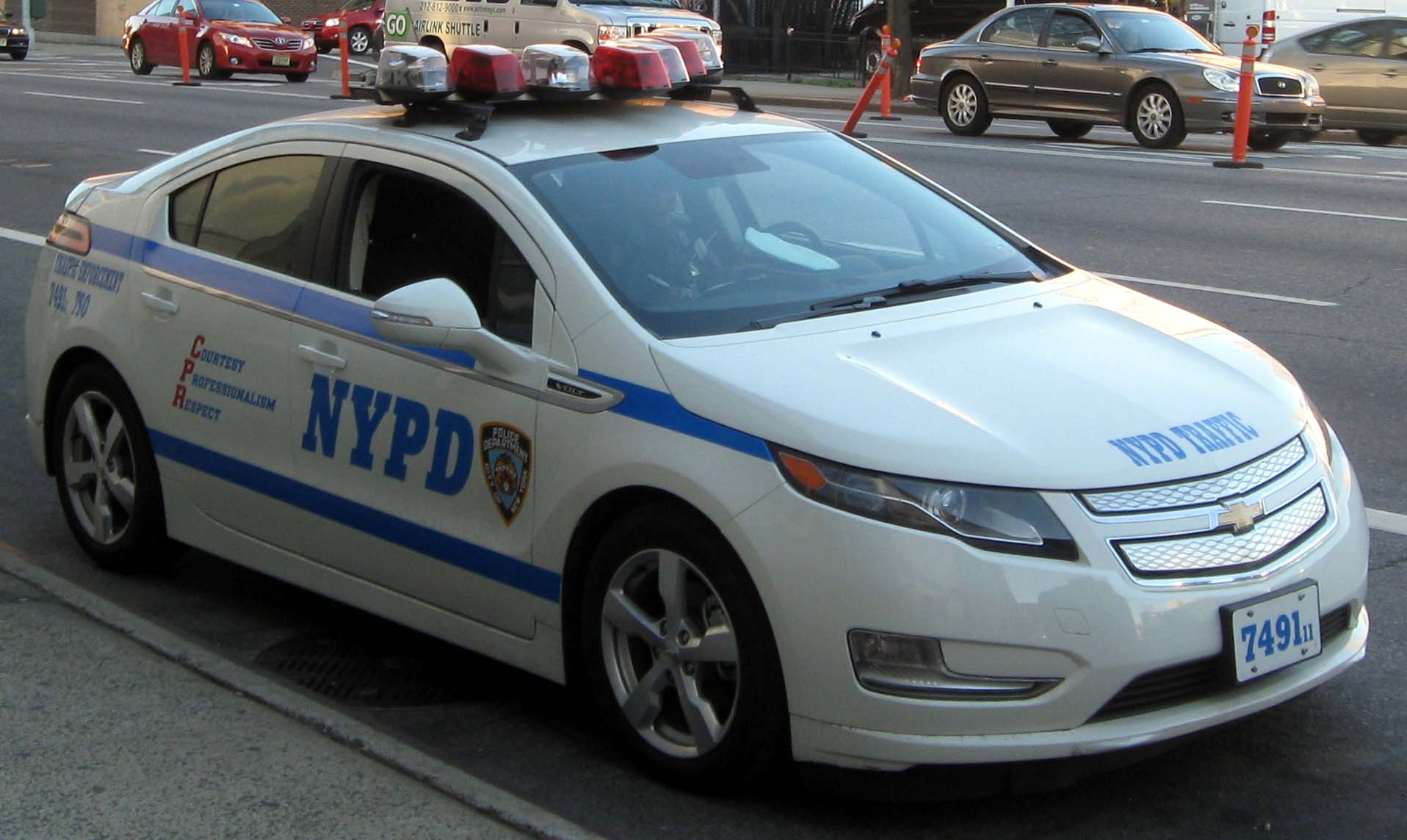
A Chevrolet Volt in service for the New York City Police Department

As of March 2022, there were about 62,000 electric vehicles in New York, accounting for 0.6% of all vehicles in the state.

== Government policy ==
In August 2009, the New York State Energy Research and Development Authority began a study on the effects of plug-in electric vehicles on the state's power grid.

in 2019, New York State signed the Climate Leadership and Community Protection Act in law, which sets goals to reduce emissions to 40% below 1990 levels by 2030 and then to 85% below 1990 levels by 2050.

In September 2021, Governor Kathy Hochul signed into law a bill requiring all new vehicles sold in the state to be zero-emission by 2035. In January 2022, the state government announced US$12 million to be spent on the state's electric vehicle tax rebate program, which offers rebates of up to $2,000 for each electric vehicle purchase.

=== State fleet ===
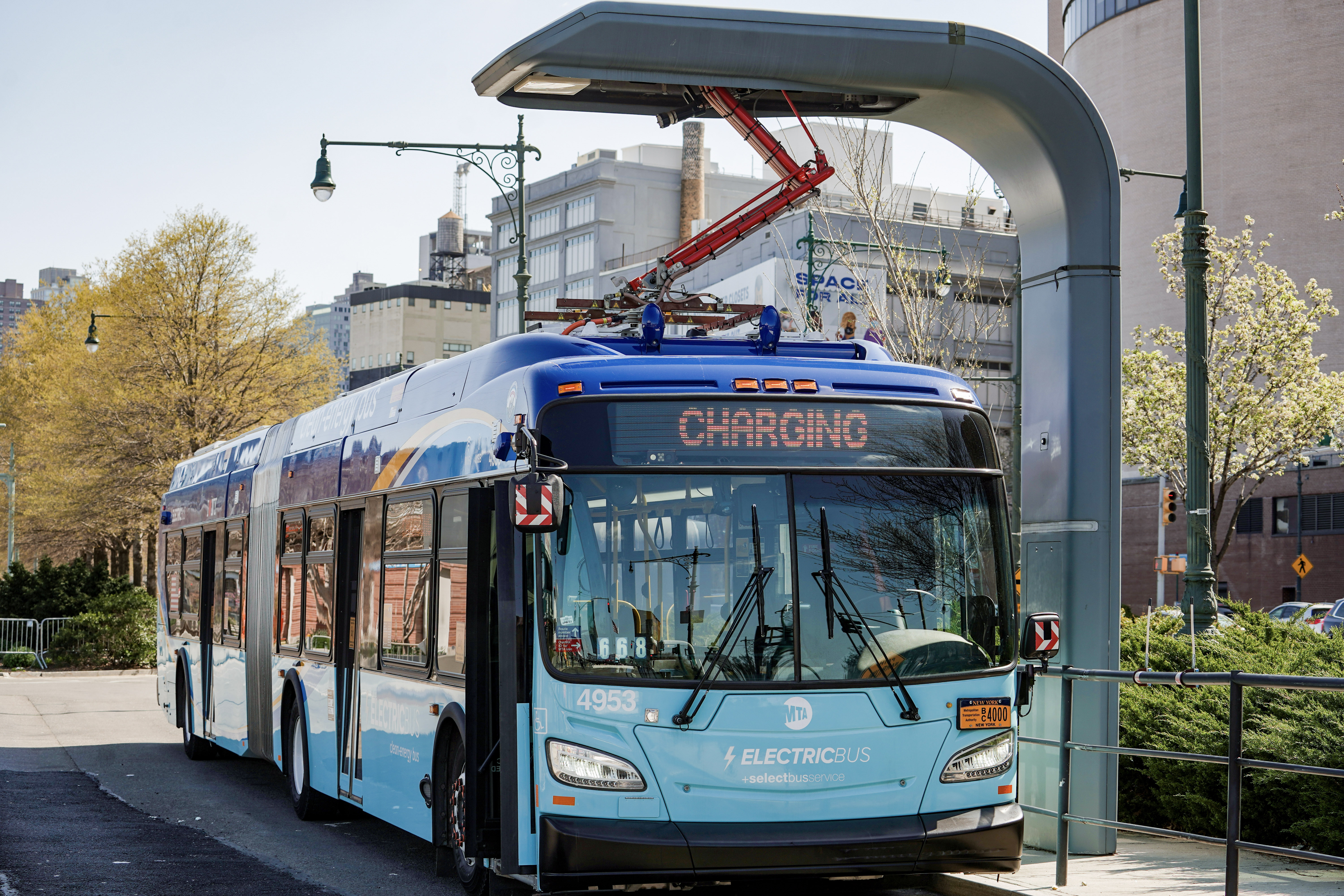
MTA Regional Bus Operations New Flyer XE60 electric articulated bus being charged

On August 2, 2006, Governor George E. Pataki and State Senate Majority Leader Joseph Bruno announced plans for a new US$10 million State program to convert 600 vehicles in the state fleet to plug-in hybrid, conduct testing for greenhouse gas reduction technologies, and improve the efficiency of public transportation systems. The first plug-in hybrid was added to the fleet on December 20, 2006.

The Metropolitan Transportation Authority (MTA) notes that they expect to purchase only zero-emission buses from 2029 onwards, and aim to have a fully zero-emission bus fleet by 2040.

== Charging stations ==
As of December 2021, there were about 9,300 charging stations in the state.

== By region ==
=== Albany ===
In October 2021, Albany County announced a plan to transition the county fleet entirely to electric by 2030.

=== Buffalo ===
As of June 2021, there were about 1,900 electric vehicles registered in Erie County.

=== New York City ===
As of March 2023, there were about 27,000 electric vehicles registered in New York City. As of March 2022, 10,000 were registered in Brooklyn, 4,000 in Manhattan, 4,000 in Queens, 1,700 in the Bronx, and 1,200 in Staten Island. As of June 2021, there were about 8,000 electric vehicles registered in Suffolk County, and 6,000 in Nassau County.

As of August 2022, there were 100 public curbside charging stations in New York City.

In October 2021, Suffolk County and Westchester County announced plans to transition the county fleets entirely to electric by 2030.

In December 2021, the city government announced an investment of US$420 million in electric vehicles, including charging stations and the electrification of the city fleet. This is the largest investment in electric vehicles ever made by any local government in the United States.

=== Rochester ===
In July 2022, the Rochester municipal government introduced an electric vehicle carsharing service.
