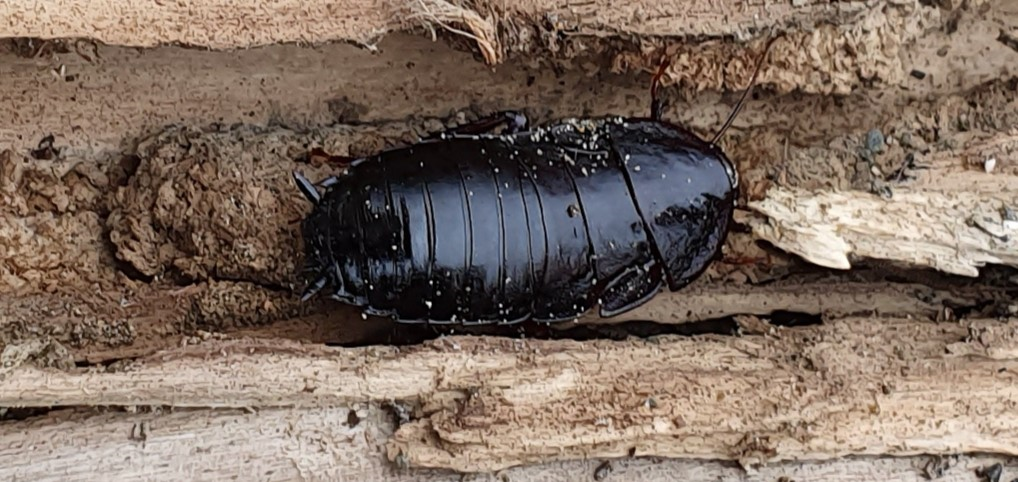

Scientific classification
- Kingdom: Animalia
- Phylum: Arthropoda
- Clade: Pancrustacea
- Class: Insecta
- Order: Blattodea
- Family: Blattidae
- Genus: Platyzosteria
- Species: P. novaeseelandiae

Binomial name
- Platyzosteria novaeseelandiae (Brunner von Wattenwyl, 1865)

Synonyms
- Polyzosteria novaeseelandiae Brunner von Wattenwyl, 1865; Periplaneta fortipes Walker, 1868; Blatta forticeps Hutton, 1881; Maoriblatta novaeseelandiae Princis, 1966

= Platyzosteria novaeseelandiae =

Species of cockroach

Platyzosteria novaeseelandiae, or the large black kēkerengū, is a species of cockroach in the family Blattidae. Its other names include black stink-roach, black stink cockroach, black cockroach and papata pango. It is known for the defensive chemical it produces when disturbed.

== Description ==
Platyzosteria novaeseelandiae is a large cockroach (25–29 mm long) with a glossy black integument. Its legs are dark red and antennae brown at the base, becoming lighter coloured towards the apices. Its dorsal surface is covered in fine punctures. It is the largest endemic cockroach in New Zealand. This cockroach is flightless. The holotype specimen is stored at the Natural History Museum, Vienna.

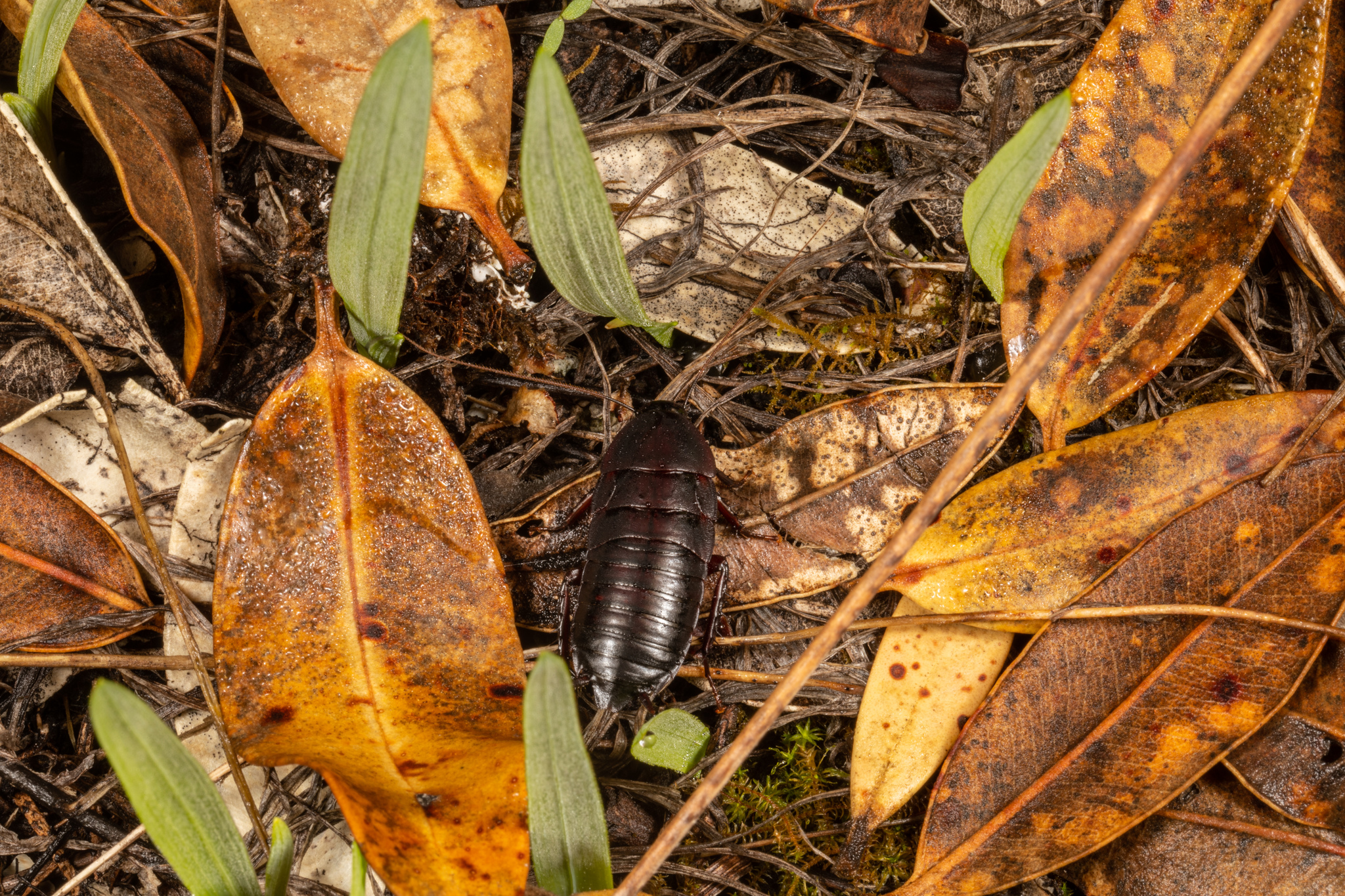
P. novaeseelandiae in its forest habitat (tegmina visible)

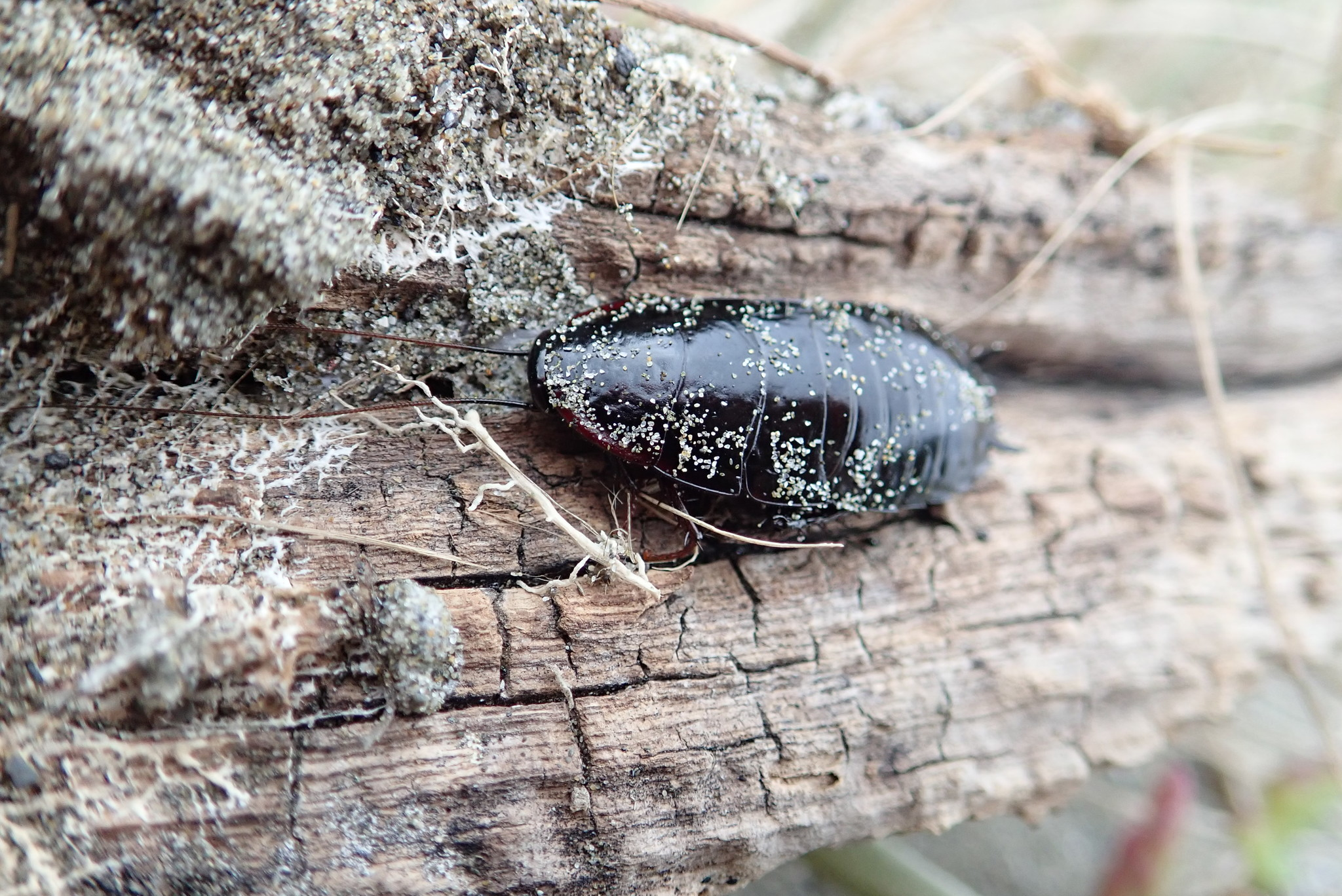
On driftwood. If an adult lacks tegmina (reduced forewing) then it is an introduced Australian species, not P. novaeseelandiae.

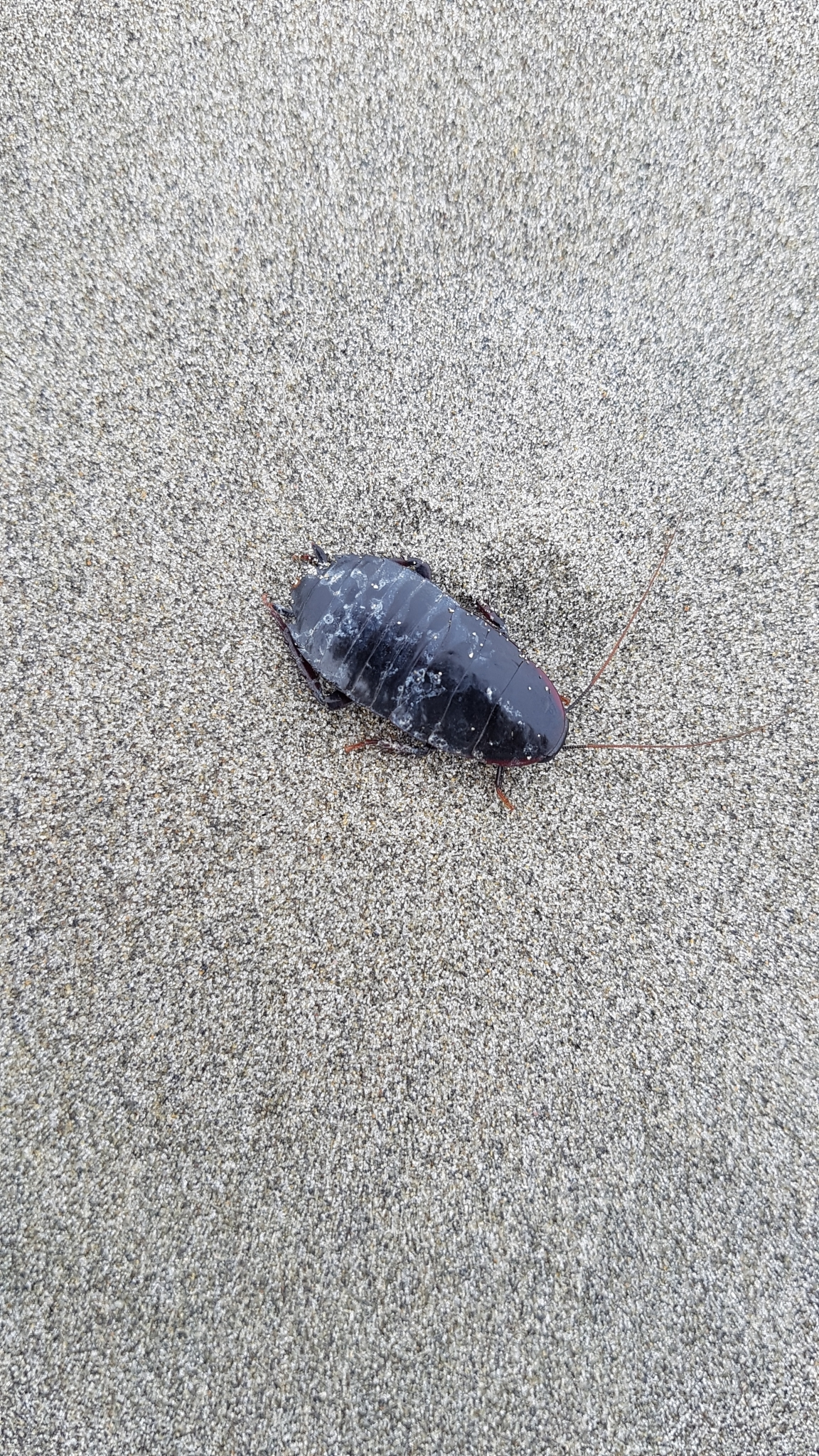
On the beach

== Distribution and habitat ==
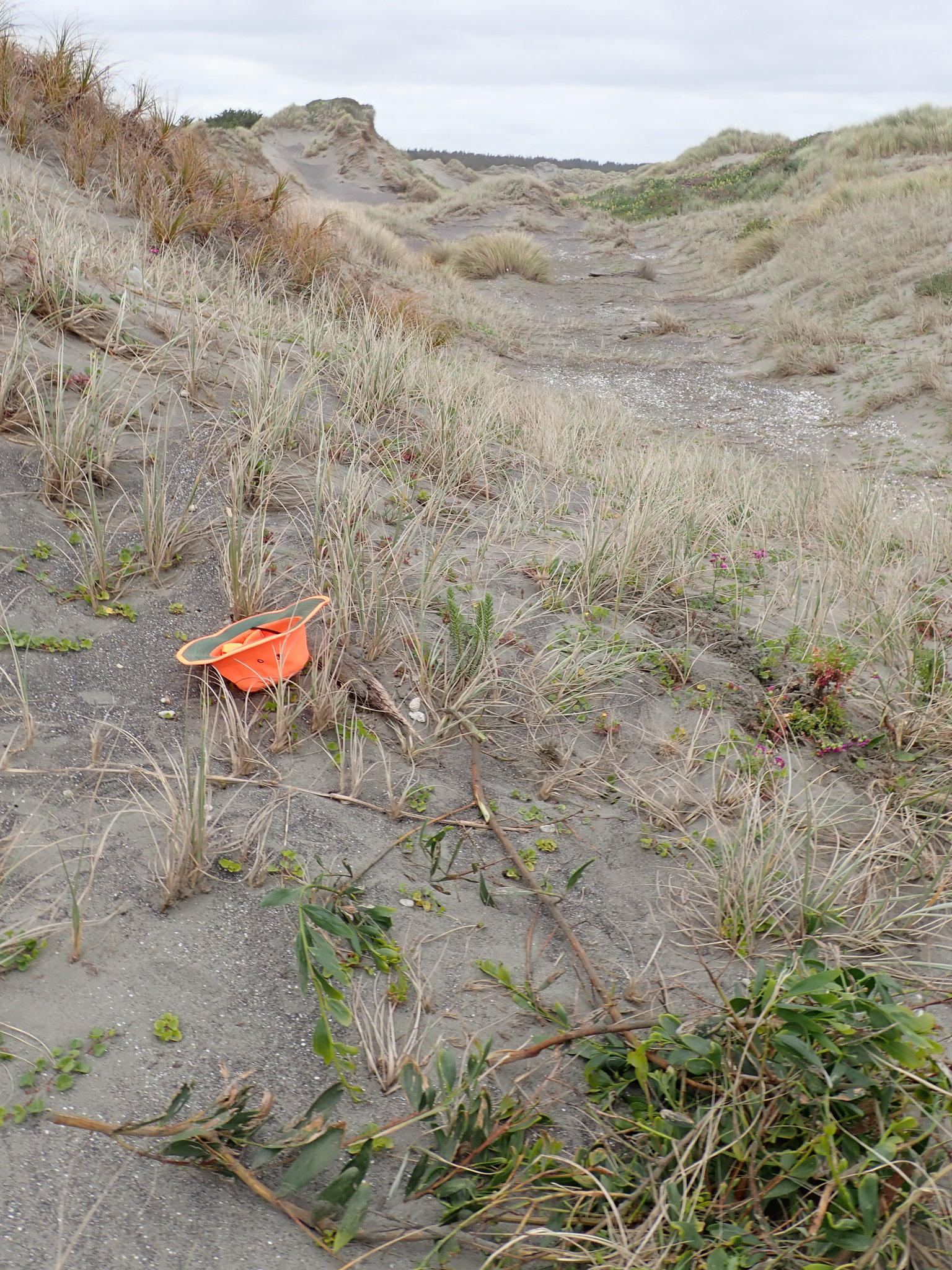
A typical coastal habitat of the species

This species is found in native lowland forests throughout the North Island and in coastal regions of northern areas of the South Island in New Zealand. Collection records exist from the Three Kings Islands in the north to Kaikōura in the south. Its altitudinal range is from sea level to 600 m on the North Island. It is found among grasses and beneath rotten logs, stones and debris, where it eats decaying plant material. It is usually nocturnal, hiding behind tree bark, under stones or logs during the day. An introduced species of black cockroach found on the NZ coast (probably a Polyzosteria species from Australia) is sometimes mistaken for Platyzosteria novaeseelandiae but can be distinguished by lack of tegmina in adults.

== Defence ==
This species of cockroach has a defensive behaviour of releasing an opaque yellow-coloured liquid from a scent gland that is located inside the abdomen. It will use this defence if handled or disturbed from its retreat. The liquid is secreted from an opening between the sixth and seventh sternites. The gland only produces the chemical defence in adult cockroaches. Research has shown that predators including weka, pūkeko and mice are effectively repelled by the scent produced by Platyzosteria novaeseelandiae.
