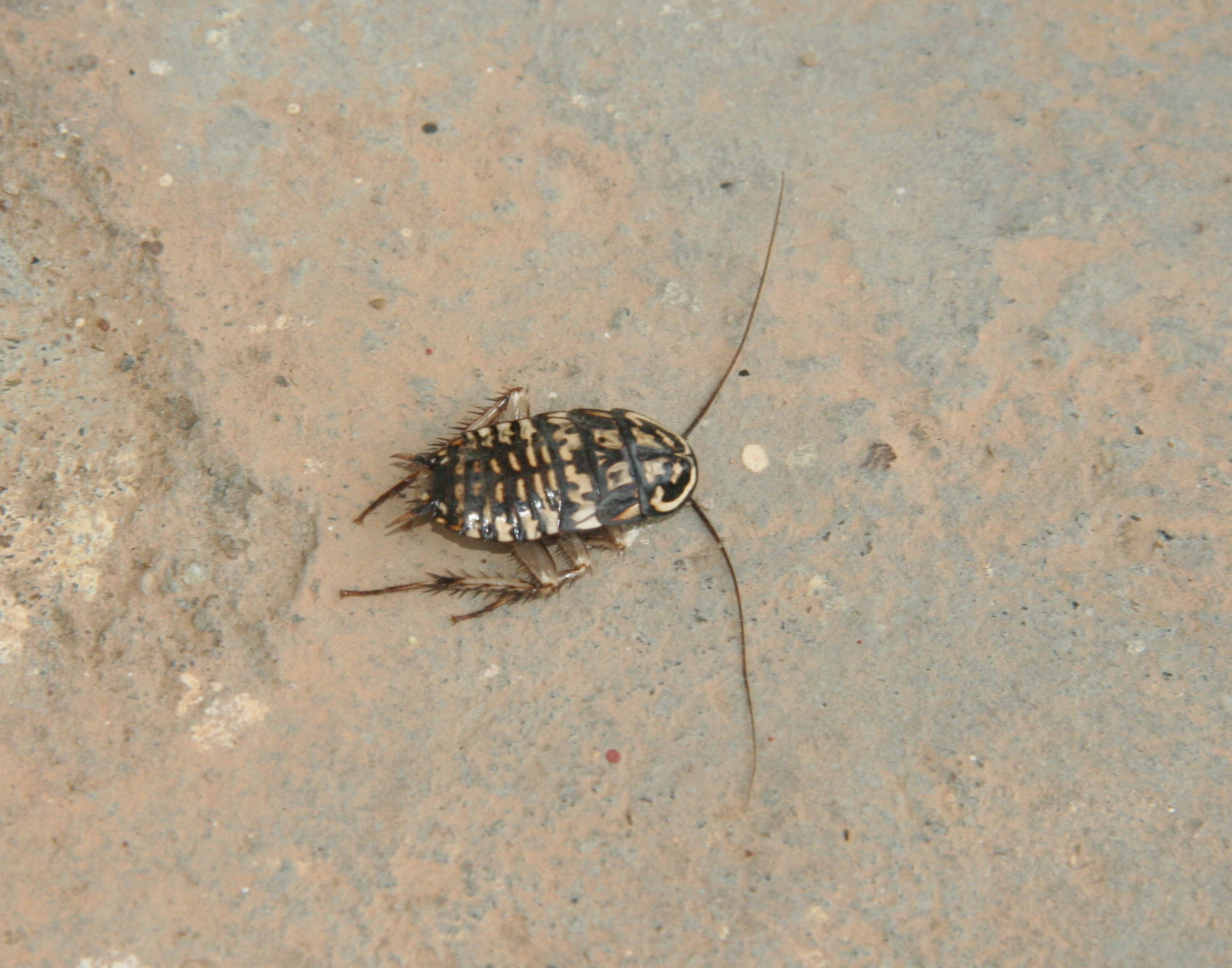

Scientific classification
- Kingdom: Animalia
- Phylum: Arthropoda
- Clade: Pancrustacea
- Class: Insecta
- Order: Blattodea
- Family: Blattidae
- Genus: Neostylopyga
- Species: N. rhombifolia

Binomial name
- Neostylopyga rhombifolia (Stoll, 1813)

= Neostylopyga rhombifolia =

Species of cockroach

Neostylopyga rhombifolia, the harlequin roach, is a species of flightless cockroach in the family Blattidae. It is a synanthropic species, often found in houses, and it is usually considered a pest. It has been introduced globally to tropical and subtropical regions as a result of trade. Its original native range is unknown, but is believed to be somewhere in tropical Asia.

Harlequin roach adults are around 20 to 27 mm (0.79 to 1.06 in) long. Both males and females are flightless. They lack hindwings, and the forewings (tegminia) are reduced to two small lobes. Both also have distinctive black and yellow patterns. Females are typically larger and stouter than males. Harlequin roaches are popular as pets due to their striking coloration.

Harlequin roaches produce a strong-smelling chemical defense, amyl acetate, that has been compared to almond, cherry, pear, or banana extracts.

The mitochondrial genome of the harlequin roach was sequenced in 2016.

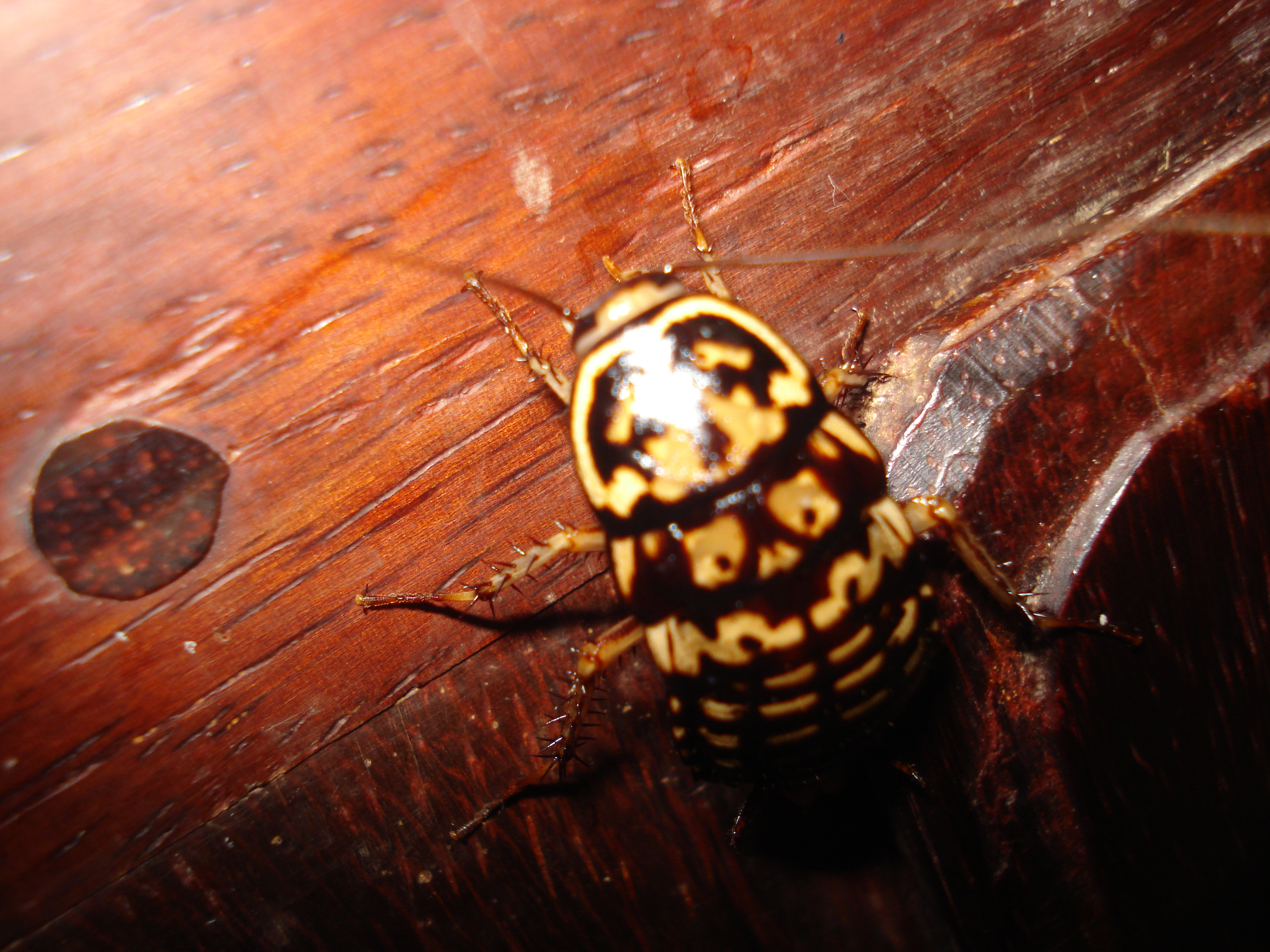
Harlequin roach, Neostylopyga rhombifolia
