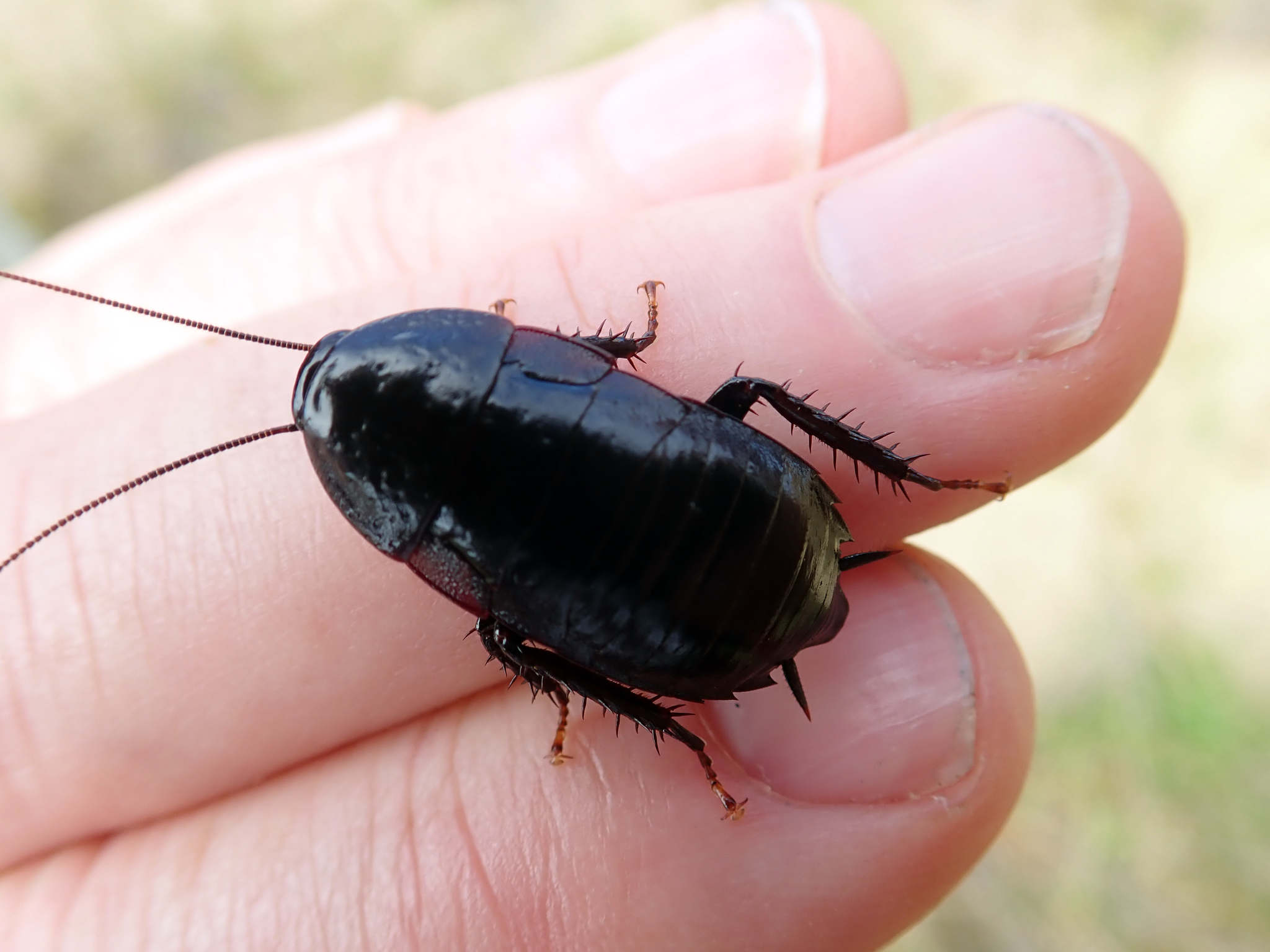
- Maoriblatta novaeseelandia

Scientific classification
- Kingdom: Animalia
- Phylum: Arthropoda
- Clade: Pancrustacea
- Class: Insecta
- Order: Blattodea
- Family: Blattidae
- Subfamily: Blattinae
- Genus: Maoriblatta; Princis, 1966

= Maoriblatta =

Genus of cockroaches

Maoriblatta is a genus of cockroaches belonging to the family Blattidae.

The species of this genus are found in Australia and New Zealand.

Species:

- Maoriblatta albipalpis (Chopard, 1924)
- Maoriblatta brunni (Alfken, 1901)
- Maoriblatta laevipennis (Chopard, 1924)
- Maoriblatta novaeseelandiae (Brunner von Wattenwyl, 1865)
- Maoriblatta rufoterminata (Brunner von Wattenwyl, 1865)
- Maoriblatta sublobata (Princis, 1954)
