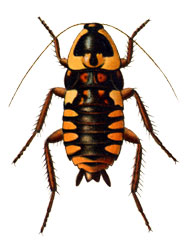
- Neostylopyga ornata, a typical member of the genus

Scientific classification
- Kingdom: Animalia
- Phylum: Arthropoda
- Clade: Pancrustacea
- Class: Insecta
- Order: Blattodea
- Family: Blattidae
- Subfamily: Blattinae
- Genus: Neostylopyga; Shelford, 1911

Species
- See text

= Neostylopyga =

Genus of cockroaches

Neostylopyga is a genus of cockroaches described by Robert Walter Campbell Shelford in 1911.

== Taxonomy and systematics ==
The type species of the genus is Neostylopyga rhombifolia (Stoll, 1813), but at first it was assigned to the genus Blatta and subsequently to other genera, including Periplaneta, to which it is closely related.

== Accepted species ==
Species records (probably incomplete) are from Africa, southern Asia and Australia; the Cockroach Species File lists:

1. Neostylopyga albofasciata (Hanitsch, 1950)
2. Neostylopyga annulicornis Princis, 1962
3. Neostylopyga atrox (Hanitsch, 1928)
4. Neostylopyga badia Princis, 1966
5. Neostylopyga coxalis (Walker, 1868)
6. Neostylopyga hova (Saussure, 1891)
7. Neostylopyga jambusanensis Roth, L. M., 1988
8. Neostylopyga maculifrons (Hanitsch, 1931)
9. Neostylopyga maindroni (Shelford, 1911)
10. Neostylopyga michaelseni (Shelford, 1909)
11. Neostylopyga modesta Bei-Bienko, 1965
12. Neostylopyga nana (Shelford, 1912)
13. Neostylopyga neavei (Shelford, 1911)
14. Neostylopyga nkelei (Hanitsch, 1950)
15. Neostylopyga nossibei (Saussure, 1899)
16. Neostylopyga ornata (Brunner von Wattenwyl, 1865)
17. Neostylopyga parallela Bolivar, 1897
18. Neostylopyga picea (Brunner von Wattenwyl, 1865)
19. Neostylopyga propinqua (Shelford, 1910)
20. Neostylopyga quadrilobata (Brunner von Wattenwyl, 1898)
21. Neostylopyga rhombifolia (Stoll, 1813) - type species
22. Neostylopyga rufimarginata (Hanitsch, 1950)
23. Neostylopyga salomonis (Shelford, 1910)
24. Neostylopyga schultzei (Shelford, 1912)
25. Neostylopyga sexpustulata (Walker, 1871)
26. Neostylopyga variabilis Princis, 1962
27. Neostylopyga voeltzkowi (Saussure, 1899)
28. Neostylopyga weileri (Shelford, 1908)
29. Neostylopyga yemenica (Bei-Bienko, 1969)

Note: Neostylopyga laosana Anisyutkin, 2010 and other species may now be placed in the genus Macrostylopyga: or elsewhere in the Blattinae. These include species which are strikingly coloured and patterned and are popular in cultures under the common name harlequin roaches or harlequin cockroaches.

== Pest status ==
Neostylopyga is related to invasive pest species such as Periplaneta americana, and like the major pest species, some members of the genus, such as Neostylopyga rhombifolia, the "harlequin cockroach", have spread to so many regions as to be regarded with suspicion at least. In some countries, it already is seen as a largely outdoor domestic pest. Certainly none of the species is widely seen as one of the major pest roaches yet.
