= Polyzosteria yingina =

Scientific classification
- Kingdom: Animalia
- Phylum: Arthropoda
- Clade: Pancrustacea
- Class: Insecta
- Order: Blattodea
- Family: Blattidae
- Genus: Polyzosteria
- Species: P. yingina

Binomial name
- Polyzosteria yingina Henry, 2020

Species of cockroach

Polyzosteria yingina is a bush cockroach (a member of the Blattidae family) found only in Tasmania. It was first described in 2020 by Shasta Henry and others.

This species consists of two very distinct populations: one an alpine population found 1,000 metres (3,300 ft) above sealevel and the other found at sealevel on Tasmania's east coast. Mitochondrial molecular analysis indicates that these two populations are a single species.
