= Megazosteria patula =

Scientific classification
- Kingdom: Animalia
- Phylum: Arthropoda
- Clade: Pancrustacea
- Class: Insecta
- Order: Blattodea
- Family: Blattidae
- Genus: Megazosteria
- Species: M. patula

Binomial name
- Megazosteria patula (Walker, 1868)

Species of cockroach

Megazosteria patula is a species of cockroach native to Australia.
