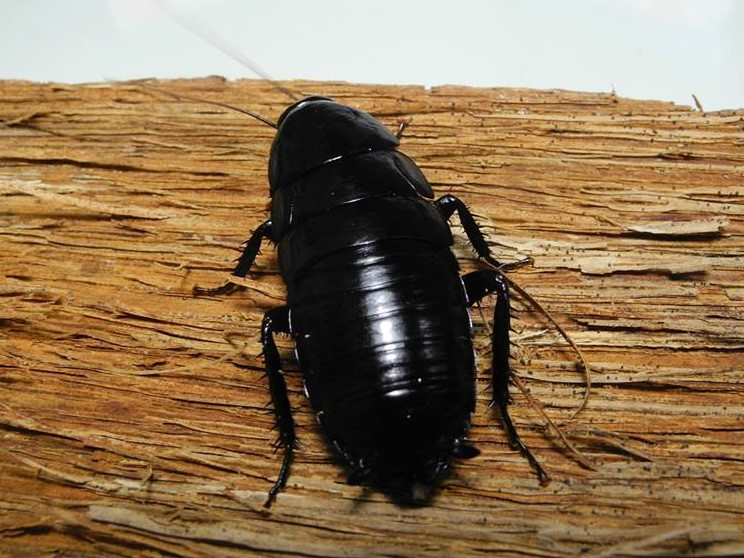

Scientific classification
- Kingdom: Animalia
- Phylum: Arthropoda
- Clade: Pancrustacea
- Class: Insecta
- Order: Blattodea
- Family: Blattidae
- Genus: Eurycotis
- Species: E. lixa

Binomial name
- Eurycotis lixa Rehn, 1930

= Eurycotis lixa =

Species of cockroach

Eurycotis lixa, the hustler cockroach, is a species of cockroach in the family Blattidae. It is found in North America and the Caribbean.
