= Polyzosteria mitchelli =

Scientific classification
- Kingdom: Animalia
- Phylum: Arthropoda
- Clade: Pancrustacea
- Class: Insecta
- Order: Blattodea
- Family: Blattidae
- Genus: Polyzosteria
- Species: P. mitchelli

Binomial name
- Polyzosteria mitchelli Angas, 1847

Species of cockroach

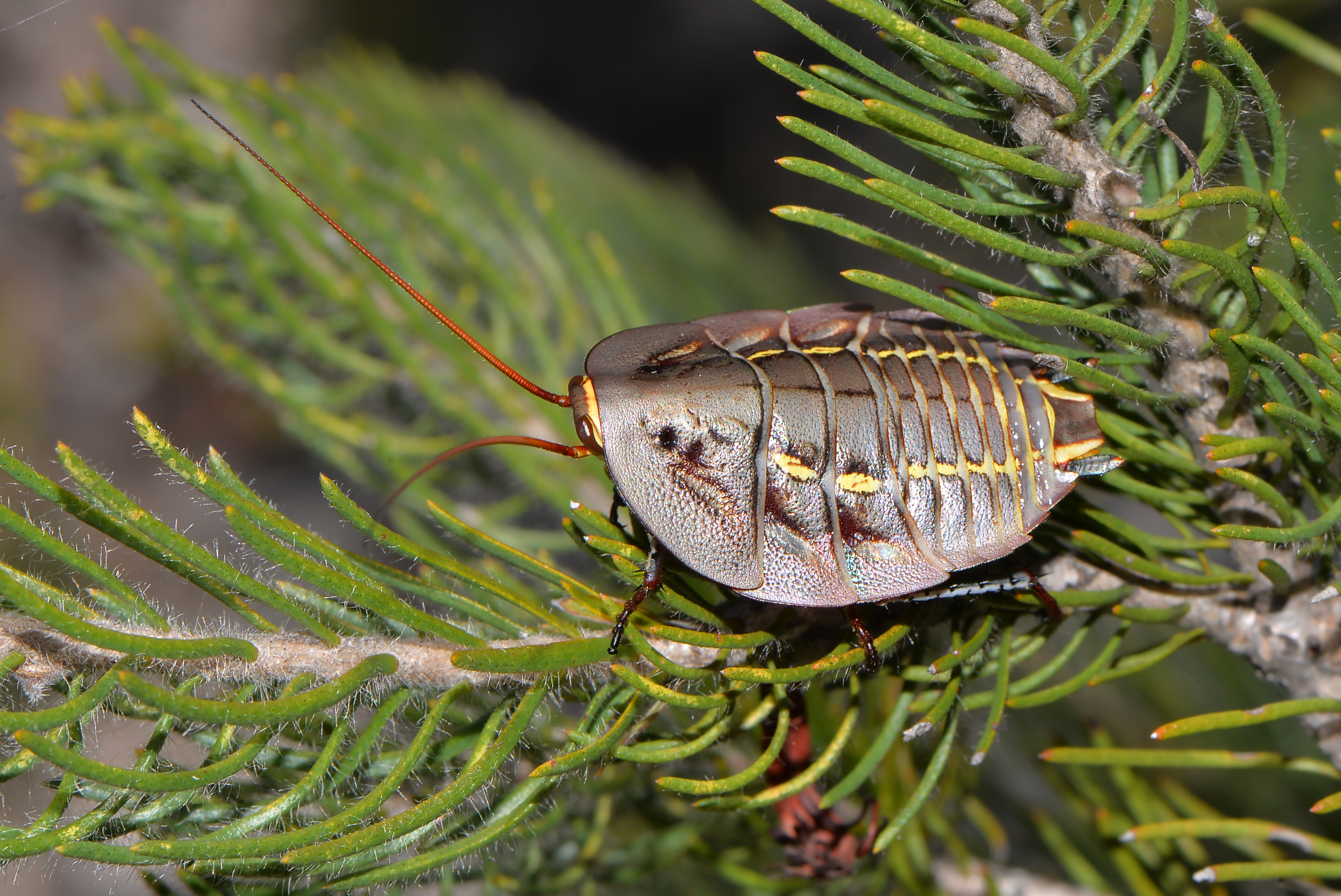

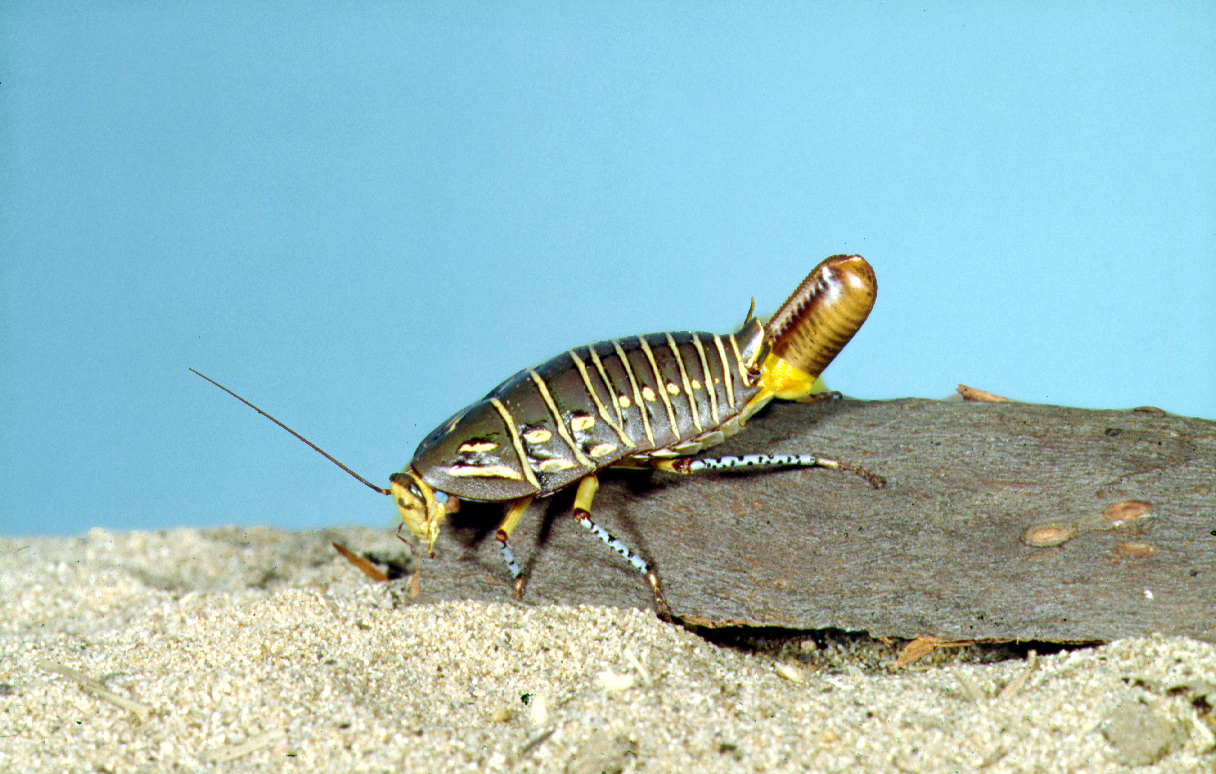
P. mitchelli

Polyzosteria mitchelli, also known as Mitchell's diurnal cockroach or the Mardi Gras cockroach, is a species of bush cockroach found in Australia. It is a diurnal species and its typical habitat is semi-arid regions of Australia's warm temperate zone.

== Description ==
Polyzosteria mitchelli is a wingless, dorsally-flattened insect. It is typically blue and yellow in colour, and thus is one of the most strikingly coloured Australian cockroaches. It is primarily found in semi-arid areas of Western Australia, South Australia and New South Wales.

P. mitchelli sprays a pungent defensive fluid from glands in its abdomen when disturbed.
