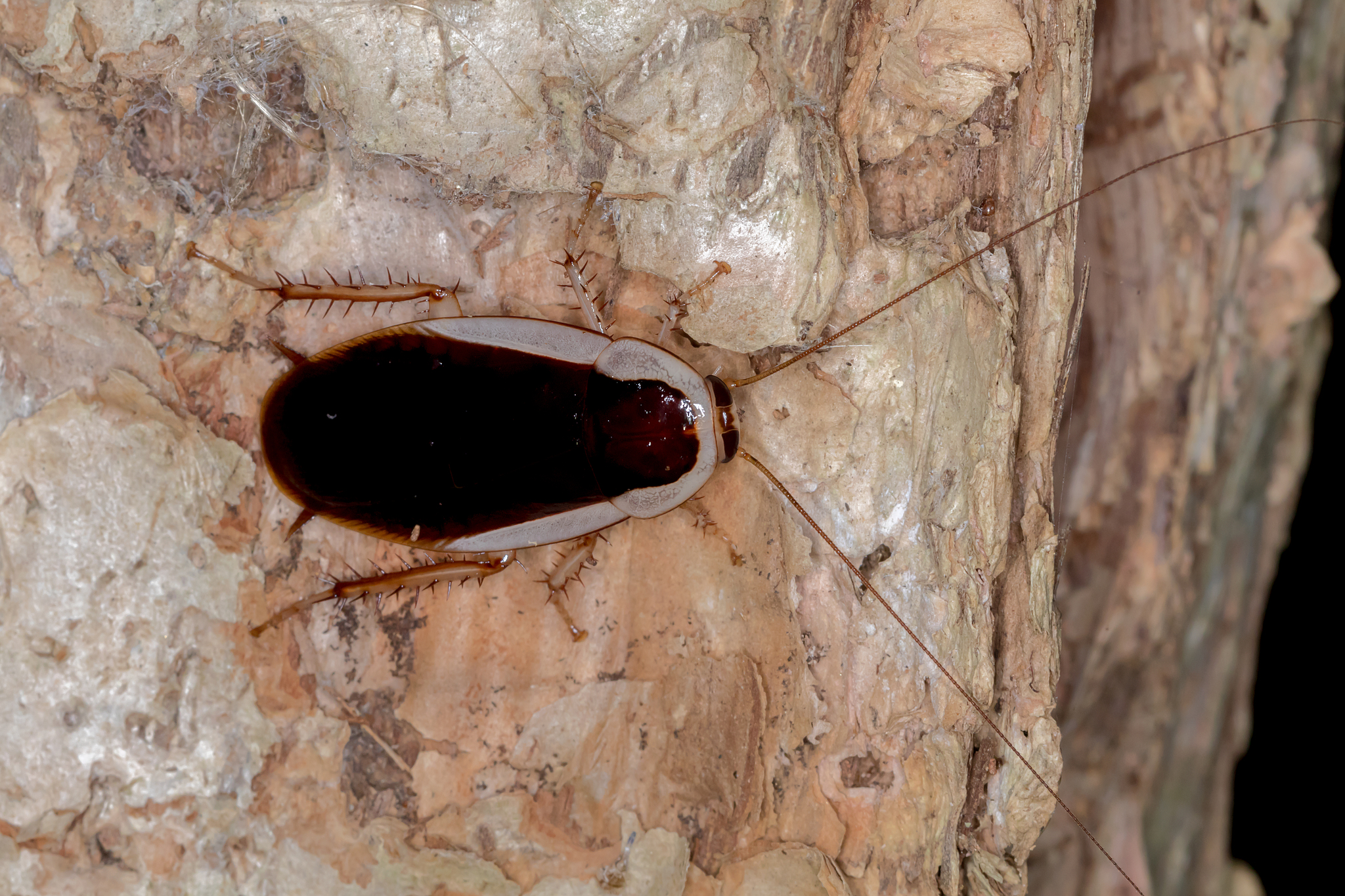
- Methana marginalis seen on the Gold Coast, Queensland, Australia

Scientific classification
- Kingdom: Animalia
- Phylum: Arthropoda
- Clade: Pancrustacea
- Class: Insecta
- Order: Blattodea
- Family: Blattidae
- Genus: Methana
- Species: M. marginalis

Binomial name
- Methana marginalis (Saussure, 1864)

Synonyms
- Periplaneta marginalis Saussure, 1864; Periplaneta ligata Brunner, 1865

= Methana marginalis =

Species of cockroach

Methana marginalis, also known as the common methana and the bush cockroach, is a species of cockroach native to the Queensland coast of Australia. The species was first described as Periplaneta marginalis by Henri Louis Frédéric de Saussure in 1864. The species was introduced to Norfolk Island in the mid-to-late 20th century, first seen in New Zealand in the 2020s, and in the 21st century has increasingly been seen in the southeastern Australia.

== Description ==
Methana marginalis is a relatively large cockroach species, with adult specimens measuring approximately 27–28.5 mm (1.06–1.12 in). It is dark brown in colour, with a light yellow band around the edge of its body, yellow-brown coloured legs, and tegmen completely covering the abdomen.

== Taxonomy ==
Methana marginalis was first described by Henri Louis Frédéric de Saussure in 1864, who named the species Periplaneta marginalis, based on specimens that had been collected from Australia in 1845 and 1846. William Forsell Kirby placed the species within the genus Methana in 1904.

== Distribution and habitat ==
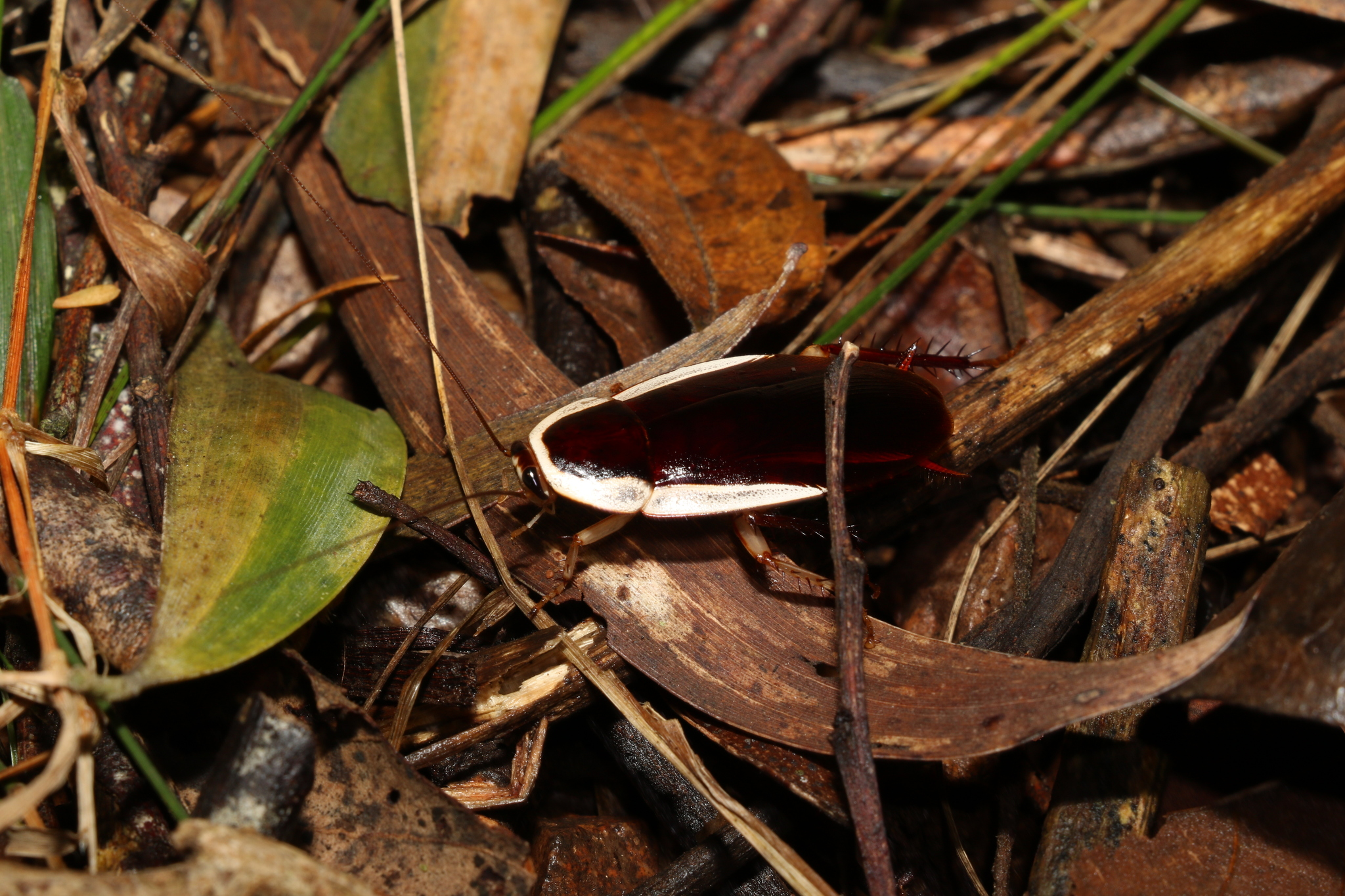
Methana marginalis is often found among leaf litter and loose bark. Pictured in Bahrs Scrub, Queensland

The species is commonly found in coastal Queensland, Australia, including K'gari / Fraser Island, and since the mid-2000s has increasingly been seen in Sydney, New South Wales. Since the 1990s, the species had been identified in Tasmania and in Victoria by the 2010s. It is commonly found in forested areas of Norfolk Island, where it is suspected to have been introduced from Queensland via nursey plant stock in the mid-to-late 20th century. The species had become common on the island by 1988.

Methana marginalis has also been identified in Buho Cave in General Luna, Surigao del Norte in the Philippines, and in New Zealand.

The species is typically found under the bark of dead trees, and among foliage, especially common in banana plantations. By the 2000s, the species had increasingly been reported to be adapting to live within Australian homes, and out-competing the German cockroach.

== Behaviour ==
Females of the species attach oothecae (egg capsules) to the undersides of loose bark and leaf litter, and cover the oothecae with debris.

== Parasites ==
The species is host to the parasitic worm species Beatogordius lineatus.

== Gallery ==
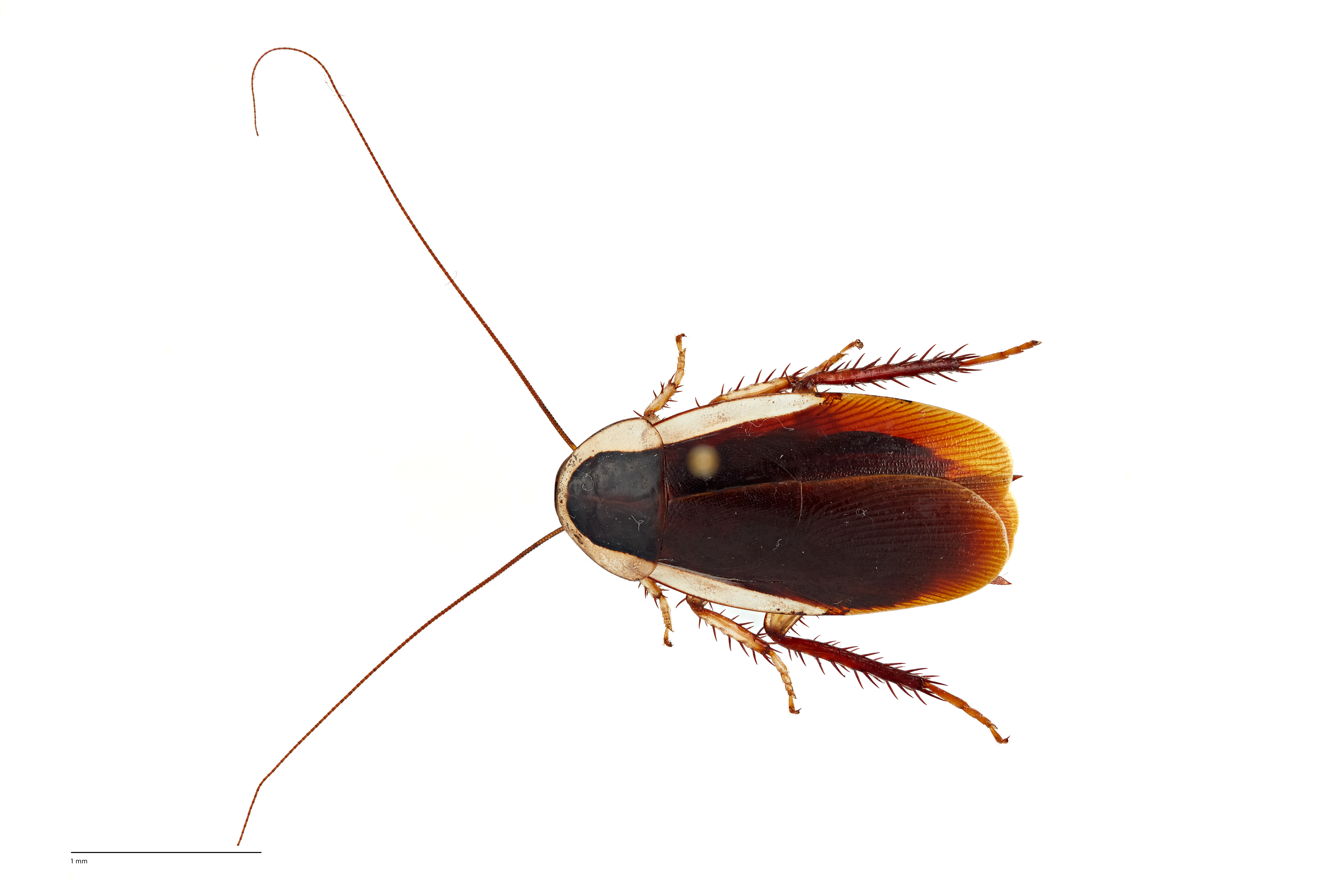
Type specimen of Methana marginalis, dorsal view

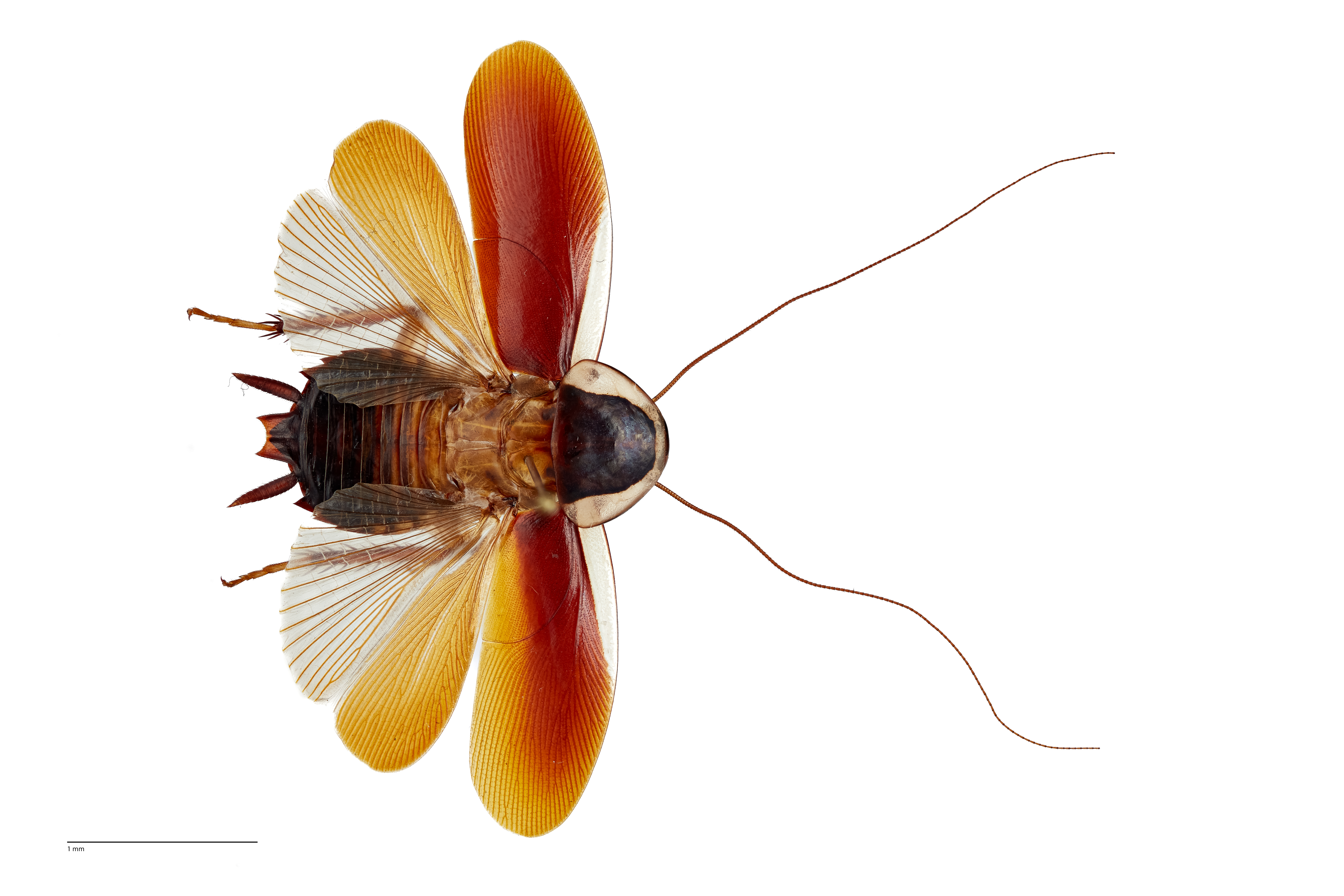
Type specimen of Methana marginalis, dorsal view with wings extended

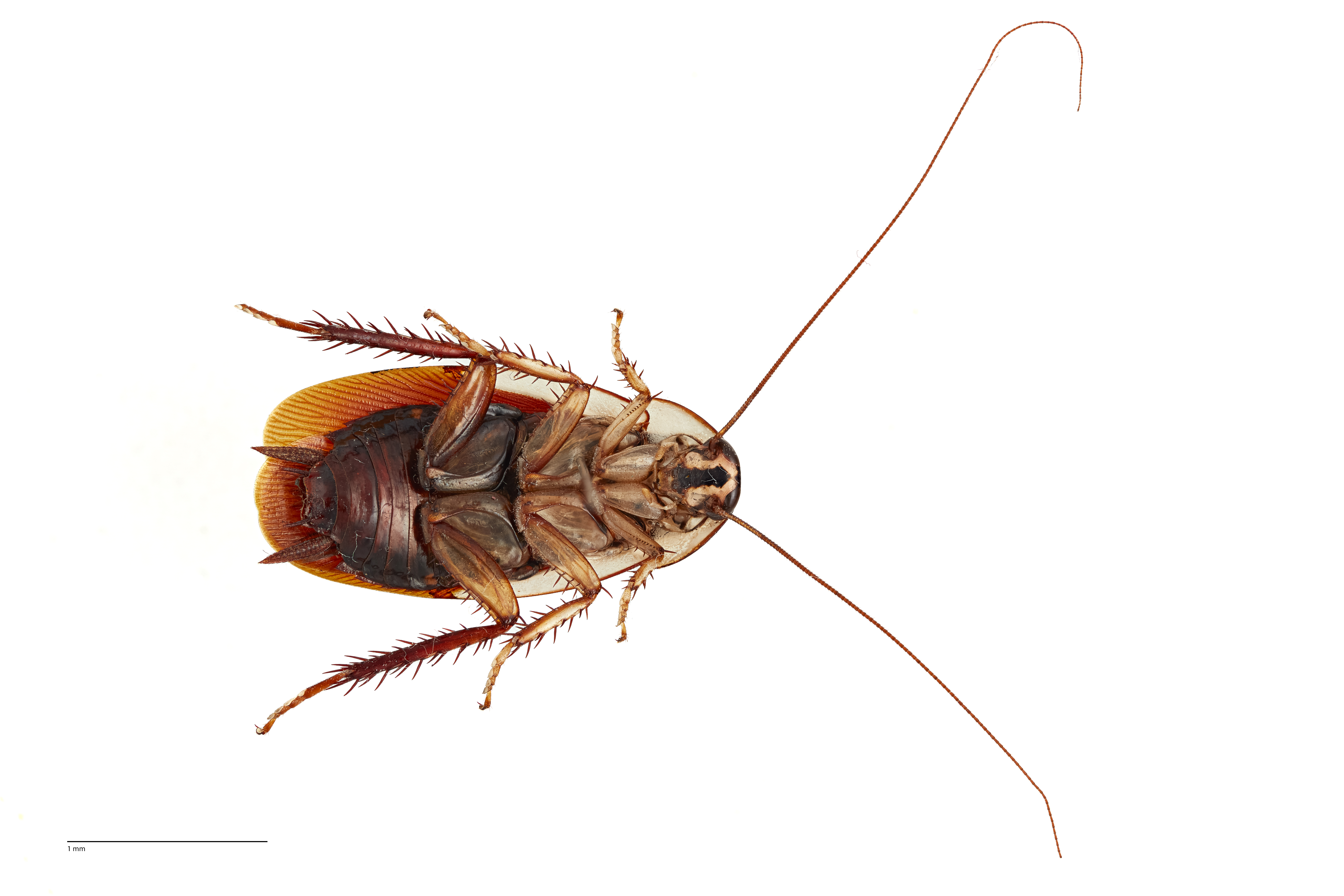
Type specimen of Methana marginalis, ventral view

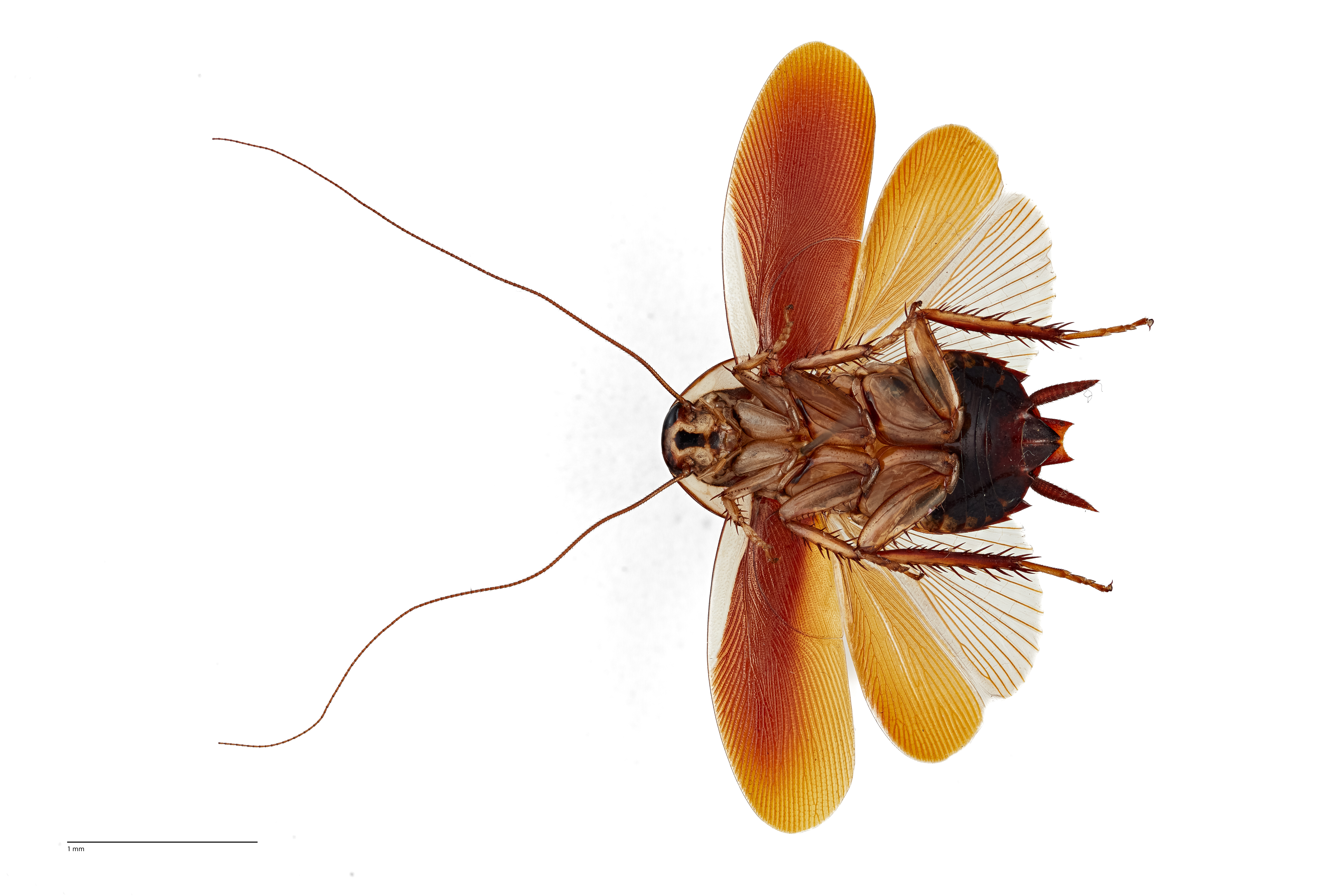
Type specimen of Methana marginalis, ventral view with wings extended
