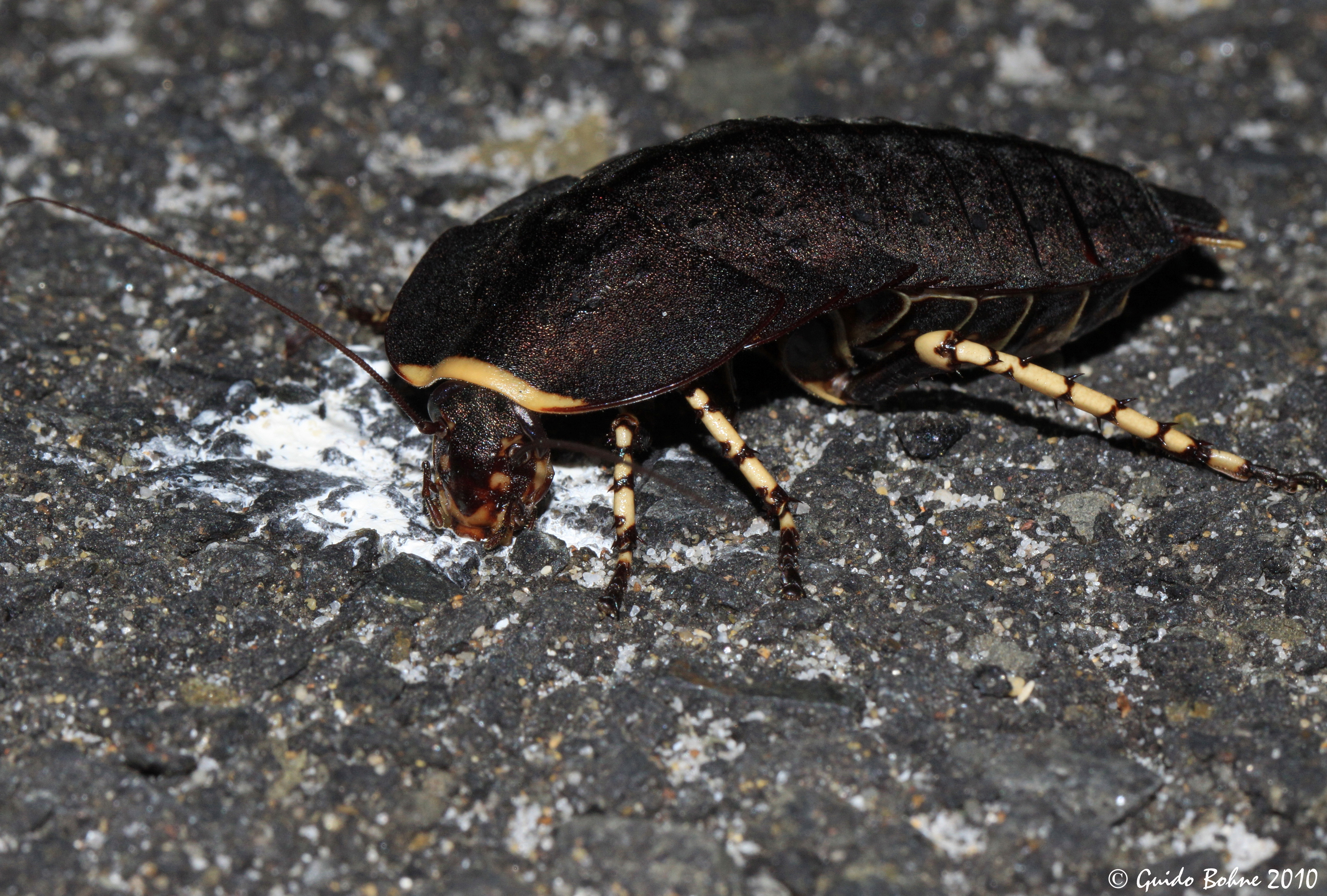

Scientific classification
- Kingdom: Animalia
- Phylum: Arthropoda
- Clade: Pancrustacea
- Class: Insecta
- Order: Blattodea
- Family: Blattidae
- Genus: Polyzosteria
- Species: P. cuprea

Binomial name
- Polyzosteria cuprea Saussure, 1863

Synonyms
- Polyzosteria maculata Brunner von Wattenwyl, 1865

= Polyzosteria cuprea =

Species of cockroach

Polyzosteria cuprea is a species of bush cockroach found in south western Australia. It is a diurnal species and its typical habitat is arid regions and eucalyptus woodland.

== Description ==
Polyzosteria cuprea is a wingless, dorsally-flattened, charcoal-grey insect. There is a large, cream-coloured patch at the front of the tergum (dorsal plate) of the prothorax, smaller cream markings on the sides of the next two terga, and cream bands on the legs.
