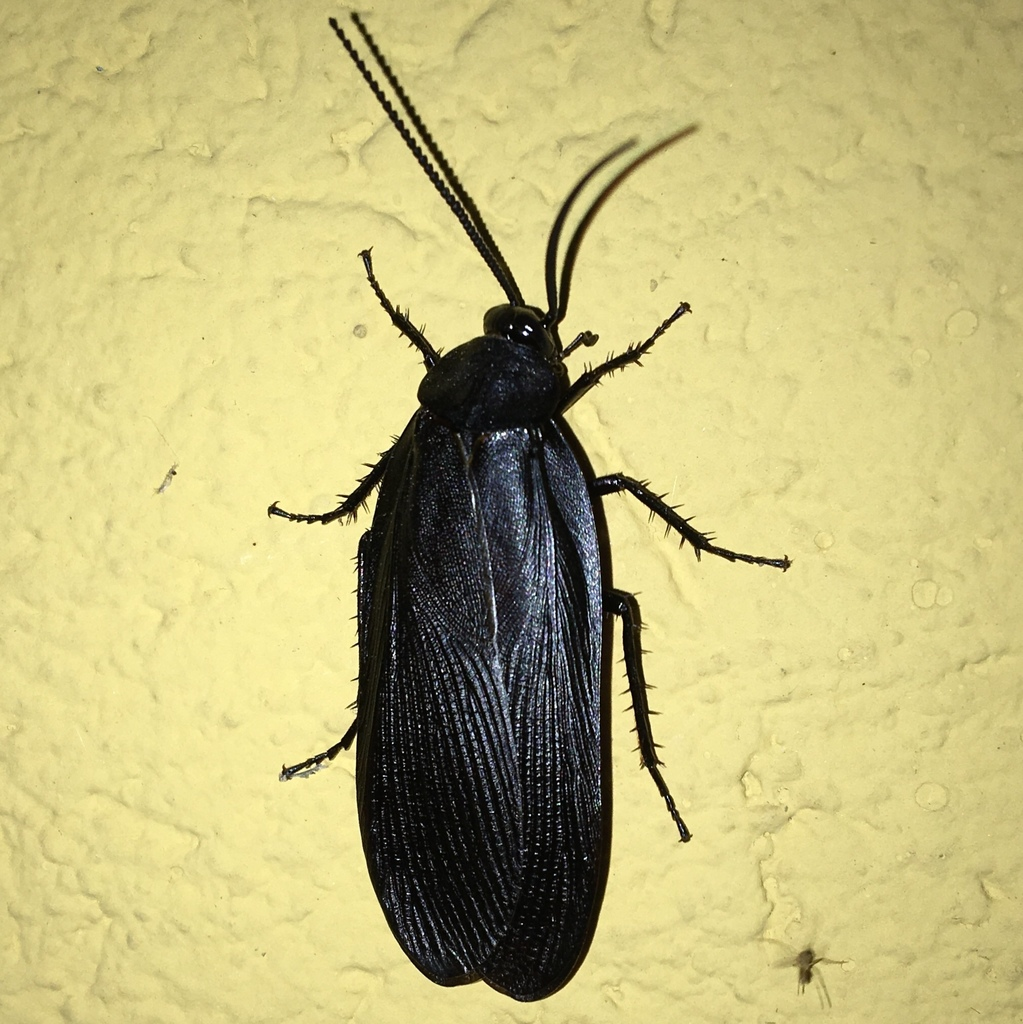
- Deropeltis roach in Haut Uele Province, Democratic Republic of Congo (DRC).

Scientific classification
- Kingdom: Animalia
- Phylum: Arthropoda
- Clade: Pancrustacea
- Class: Insecta
- Order: Blattodea
- Family: Blattidae
- Subfamily: Blattinae
- Genus: Deropeltis; Burmeister, 1838

Synonyms
- Euryzosteria Saussure, 1864

= Deropeltis =

Genus of cockroaches

Deropeltis is a genus of African cockroaches in the family Blattidae, also known as hunchback roaches, erected by Hermann Burmeister in 1838.

== Species ==
The Cockroach Species File lists:

1. Deropeltis abbreviata Chopard, 1938
2. Deropeltis adelungi Shelford, 1910
3. Deropeltis atra Brunner von Wattenwyl, 1865
4. Deropeltis autraniana Saussure, 1895
5. Deropeltis barbeyana Saussure, 1895
6. Deropeltis basilewskyi Princis, 1955
7. Deropeltis brevipennis Shelford, 1909
8. Deropeltis bueana Karsch, 1892
9. Deropeltis camerunensis Princis, 1963
10. Deropeltis carbonaria Gerstaecker, 1883
11. Deropeltis comosa Rehn, 1922
12. Deropeltis dichroa Gerstaecker, 1883
13. Deropeltis dmitriewi Adelung, 1905
14. Deropeltis elgonensis Princis, 1955
15. Deropeltis erythrocephala (Fabricius, 1781)
16. Deropeltis erythropeza Adelung, 1905
17. Deropeltis gracilis (Burmeister, 1838)
18. Deropeltis hanitschi Princis, 1955
19. Deropeltis impressa Princis, 1966
20. Deropeltis integerrima Brunner von Wattenwyl, 1865
21. Deropeltis intermedia Brunner von Wattenwyl, 1865
22. Deropeltis kachovskii Adelung, 1903
23. Deropeltis kivuensis Princis, 1955
24. Deropeltis lesnei Princis, 1963
25. Deropeltis longipennis Saussure, 1873
26. Deropeltis madecassa Saussure, 1891
27. Deropeltis melanophila (Walker, 1869)
28. Deropeltis mossambica Princis, 1963
29. Deropeltis negus Adelung, 1905
30. Deropeltis nigrita Saussure, 1895
31. Deropeltis pallidipennis Adelung, 1903
32. Deropeltis pallipes Chopard, 1938
33. Deropeltis paulinoi Bolívar, 1881
34. Deropeltis peringueyi Saussure, 1895
35. Deropeltis pilosa Princis, 1963
36. Deropeltis princisi Grandcolas, 2000
37. Deropeltis robusta Gerstaecker, 1883
38. Deropeltis robustula Princis, 1962
39. Deropeltis rufipes Hanitsch, 1938
40. Deropeltis schweinfurthi Saussure, 1895
41. Deropeltis sculpturata Krauss, 1890
42. Deropeltis stefaniniana Giglio-Tos, 1917
43. Deropeltis straeleni Jolivet, 1954
44. Deropeltis triimpressa Krauss, 1890
45. Deropeltis upembana Jolivet, 1954
46. Deropeltis verticalis Burmeister, 1838
47. Deropeltis wahlbergi (Stål, 1856)
48. Deropeltis zulu Princis, 1963
- temporary names:
  - Deropeltis chopardi
  - Deropeltis sjoestedti
  - Deropeltis tavetana
