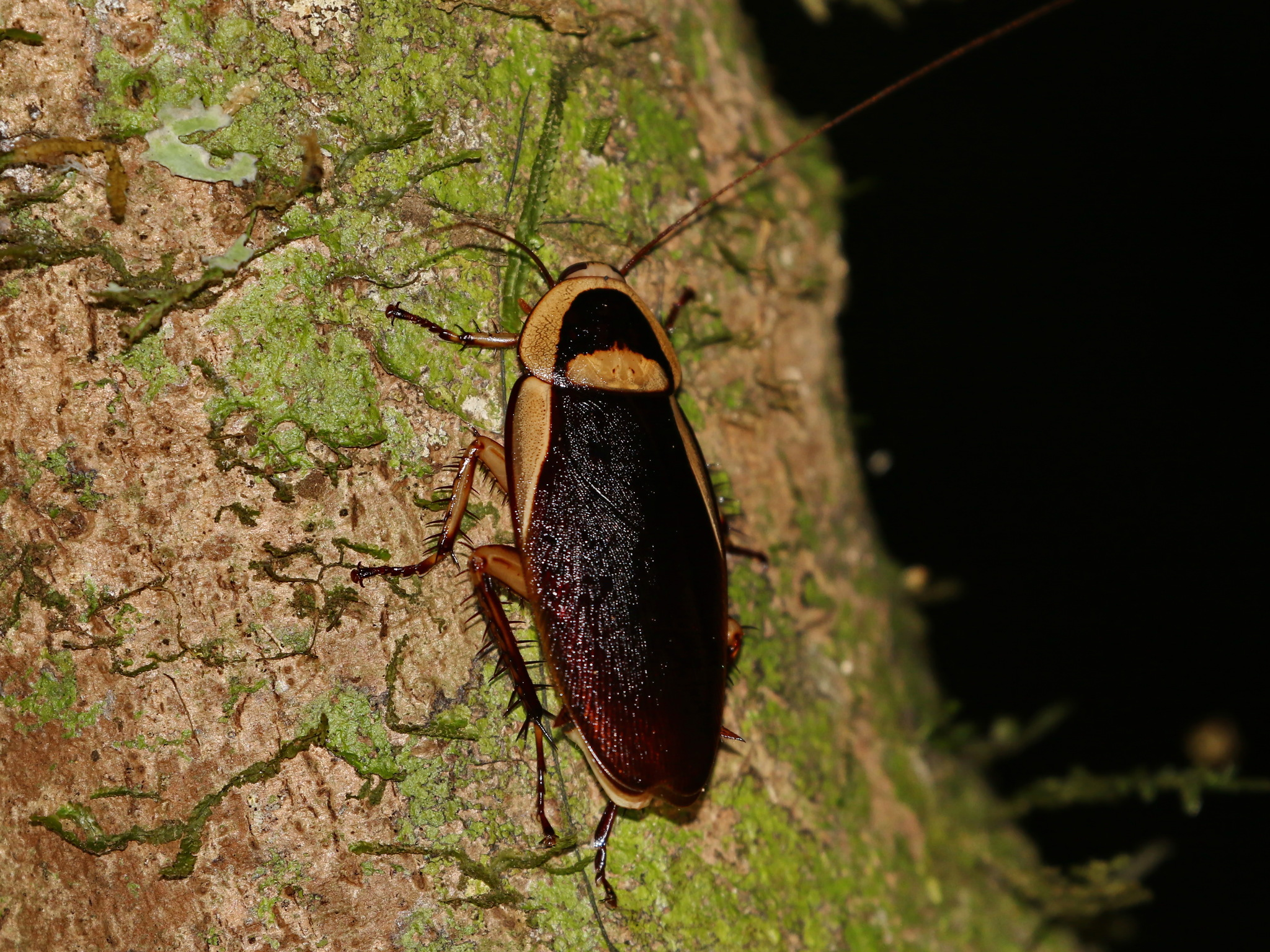
- Dorylaea heinzei

Scientific classification
- Kingdom: Animalia
- Phylum: Arthropoda
- Clade: Pancrustacea
- Class: Insecta
- Order: Blattodea
- Family: Blattidae
- Subfamily: Blattinae
- Genus: Dorylaea; Stål, 1877

Synonyms
- Methana Saussure & Zehntner, 1895

= Dorylaea =

Genus of cockroaches

External image
- Images at iNaturalist

Dorylaea is a genus of South-East Asian cockroaches in the subfamily Blattinae erected by Carl Stål in 1877. Species are sometimes called "darkling cockroaches" and their known distribution is almost certainly incomplete: having been recorded from Vietnam then peninsular Malaysia, Sri Lanka and most of Malesia including Taiwan through to Australia and the West Pacific islands.

== Species ==
The Cockroach Species File lists:

1. Dorylaea andrewsi (Hanitsch, 1931)
2. Dorylaea archershee Fernando, 1961
3. Dorylaea atrocaput Hanitsch, 1925
4. Dorylaea brunneri Stål, 1877 - type species
5. Dorylaea bryanti Caudell, 1927
6. Dorylaea crassa (Karny, 1908)
7. Dorylaea dacrydii (Hanitsch, 1923)
8. Dorylaea flavicincta (Haan, 1842)
9. Dorylaea flavicollis (Serville, 1838)
10. Dorylaea flavifrons Shaw, 1925
11. Dorylaea heinzei Hanitsch, 1930
12. Dorylaea hosei (Shelford, 1909)
13. Dorylaea magna (Shelford, 1909)
14. Dorylaea picea (Hanitsch, 1923)
15. Dorylaea prakkei Bruijning, 1948
16. Dorylaea rhabdotops Hebard, 1929
17. Dorylaea robinsoni (Hanitsch, 1915)
18. Dorylaea rotundata (Brunner von Wattenwyl, 1865)
19. Dorylaea saundersi (Hanitsch, 1923)
20. Dorylaea semimarginalis (Hanitsch, 1915)
21. Dorylaea umbellifera Hanitsch, 1933
22. Dorylaea unicolor Shelford, 1910
23. Dorylaea vietnamica Bey-Bienko, 1970
24. Dorylaea zeylanica Princis, 1951
- temporary name: Dorylaea orini
