= Megazosteria =

Scientific classification
- Kingdom: Animalia
- Phylum: Arthropoda
- Class: Insecta
- Order: Blattodea
- Family: Blattidae
- Subfamily: Polyzosteriinae
- Genus: Megazosteria; Mackerras, 1966

Genus of cockroaches

Megazosteria is a genus of cockroaches native to Australia.

The genus includes five accepted species:

- Megazosteria impressa (Tepper, 1896)
- Megazosteria nigrolutea (Mackerras, 1966)
- Megazosteria patula (Walker, 1868)
- Megazosteria purpurascens (Shaw, 1925)
- Megazosteria shawi (Mackerras, 1966)
