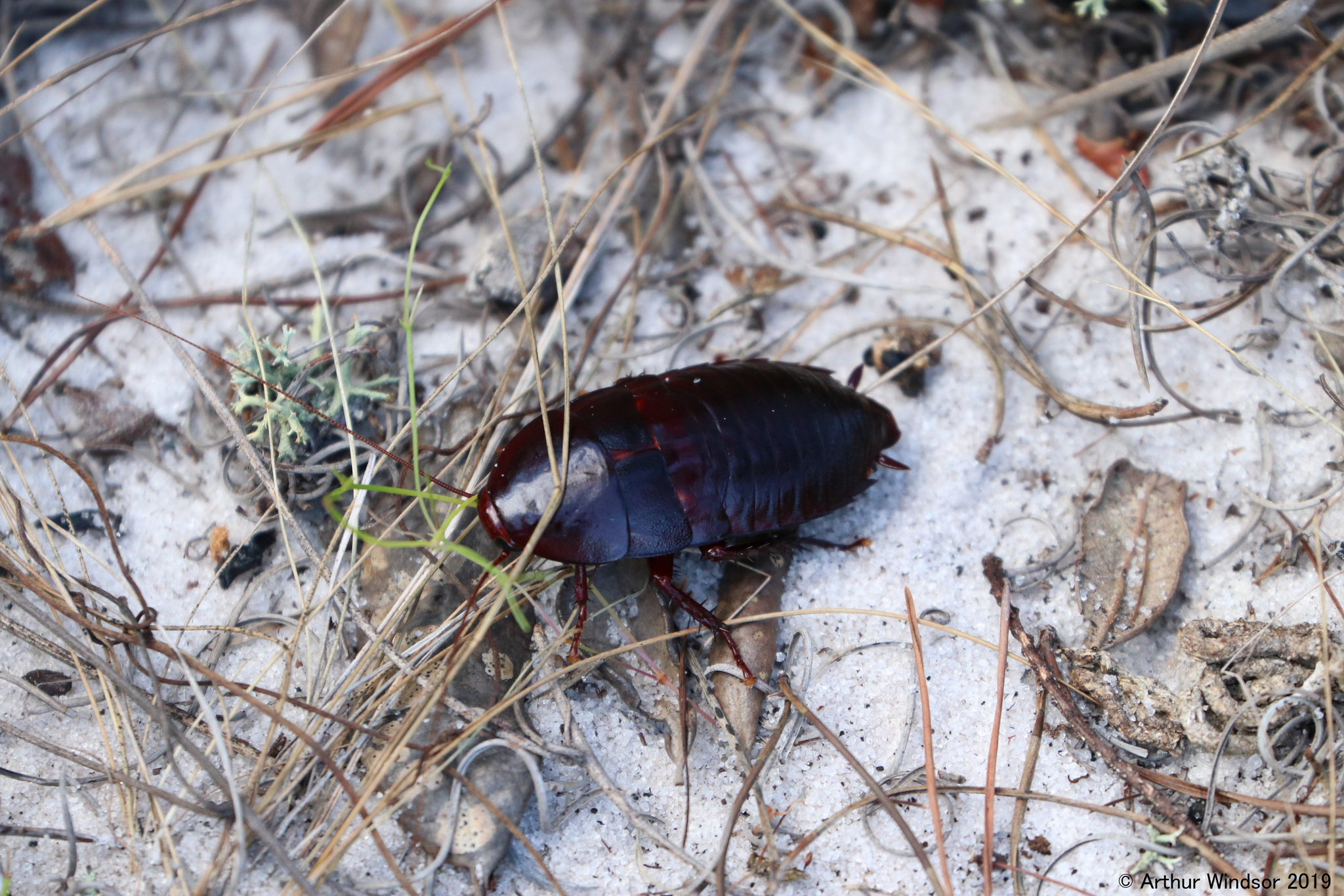
- Adult
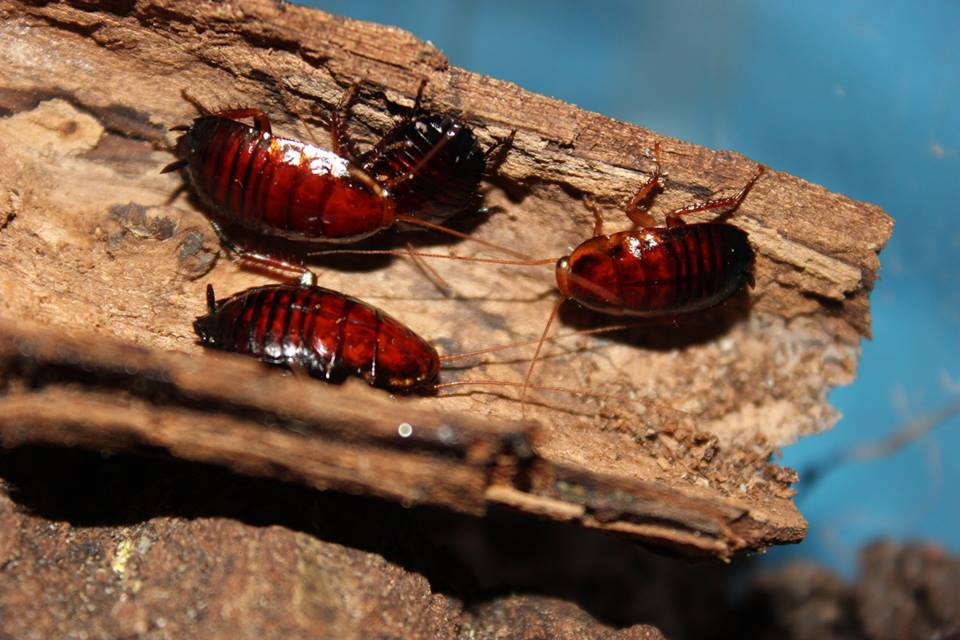
- Nymphs

Scientific classification
- Kingdom: Animalia
- Phylum: Arthropoda
- Clade: Pancrustacea
- Class: Insecta
- Order: Blattodea
- Family: Blattidae
- Genus: Eurycotis
- Species: E. floridana

Binomial name
- Eurycotis floridana (Walker, 1868)

Synonyms
- Periplaneta floridana Walker, 1868; Periplaneta semipicta Walker, 1868; Platyzosteria ingens Scudder, 1877; Platyzosteria sabaliana Scudder, 1877

= Florida woods cockroach =

Species of cockroach

The Florida woods cockroach (Eurycotis floridana) is a large cockroach species which typically grows to a length of 30–40 mm (1.2–1.6 in). When alarmed, adults can eject an extremely foul-smelling directional spray up to one metre (3.3 ft), which inspired several of its other common names: Florida skunk roach, Florida stinkroach, skunk cockroach, skunk roach, stinking cockroach, and stinkroach. Two other naming variations include Florida cockroach and Florida woods roach.

The Florida woods cockroach is slower moving than many other cockroach species. It prefers damp locations with abundant moisture, and does well in warm, damp climates. It is found in its native habitats, such as the U.S. state of Florida and the West Indies. The species wanders indoors at times, especially into damp locations, such as bathrooms; however, it prefers the outdoors and is not considered a major pest in the home. It is cold intolerant and requires a warm, subtropical or tropical climate. It can be found in sheltered outdoor locations, such as under leaf litter, in tree holes, and under lumber and boards, and other crevices, as well as in bushes and wooded areas. Often it can be seen on palmetto trees, which gave it one of its early popular names, the palmetto bug. It is not to be confused for the American cockroach (Periplaneta americana), another common Florida insect, that is sometimes also referred to as a palmetto bug.

== Description ==
The Florida wood cockroach is a dark to blackish brown, or a reddish brown after recent molting. Tegmina (fore wings) are very short, extending just past the mesonotum (the dorsal plate just behind the pronotum), and hind wings are absent.

Adults typically range from 30–40 mm (1.2–1.6 in). The winning specimen in a Florida cockroach size contest was a Florida wood cockroach which measured 62 mm (2.429 in). The Florida woods cockroach looks remarkably similar to the female oriental cockroach (Blatta orientalis), and the two could be mistaken for each other by the casual observer.

The species' dark brown ootheca (egg case) is 14–16 mm (0.55–0.63 in) long, contains 21-23 eggs, and has indentations that show where the eggs are located.

== Reproduction ==
Males can mate about 18 days after maturation, and females produce oothecae about every 8 days, beginning about 55 days after maturation. The oothecae are buried in soil or decaying logs, and hatch in 50 days at 30–36 °C (86–97 °F). Parthenogenesis (asexual reproduction) can occur, but the nymphal clones do not develop to adulthood.

== Defense ==
When alarmed, adults can emit an extremely foul-smelling glandular secretion through a sternal membrane, ejected up to 1 m (3.3 ft). Nymphs do not have this ability, and the secretion is built up over roughly 60 days from its final molt into adulthood. Males that were artificially drained required 30 days to replenish the stored amount. The secretion is composed primarily of (E)-2-hexenal, (E)-2-hexenol, and (E)-2-hexenoic acid.

The secretion is used both to deter antagonizers and as an alarm pheromone to elicit escape responses in others of its species. It can irritate the eyes of humans, and can be toxic to the cockroach in a small container. In tests with two species of mice abundant in central Florida, the chemical defense was found effective at deterring predation by Peromyscus polionotus, but at least some Peromyscus gossypinus mice were able to avoid chemical exposure by pushing the cockroach's abdomen downward and feeding from its head end.

== Habitat ==
Natural habitats of the species include holes in dead trees, stumps, and woodpiles, cavities beneath bark, and sometimes leaf litter. It occasionally enters buildings. It typically only becomes established in non-habitable areas of buildings. Not uncommonly, palmetto bugs become established inside attics, where they commonly leave behind their distinctively large droppings along with occasional body parts from dead specimens.

== Distribution ==
The species is reported in the West Indies and in a limited southeastern region of United States, consisting of the state of Florida, and coastal regions of Alabama, Georgia, South Carolina, Mississippi, Louisiana, south and southeast Texas, and southeast North Carolina. It is considered adventive, but not established, in the Canadian provinces of Newfoundland and Labrador and Nova Scotia.

== Parasites ==
The wasp species Aprostocetus hagenowii is an egg parasite of several species of cockroaches, including E. floridana. The small, parasitic wasp deposits its eggs into the ootheca of the cockroach, resulting in an average of 648 parasites per ootheca. The parasites eat the cockroach eggs and emerge from the ootheca as adults.

Another wasp species, Anastatus floridanus, is also an ootheca parasite of E. floridana, laying eggs in an ootheca carried by the female, or into a deposited ootheca as many as 36 days old. Several A. floridanus wasps may lay eggs in the same ootheca. As many as 306 adult wasps may develop from one cockroach ootheca.
