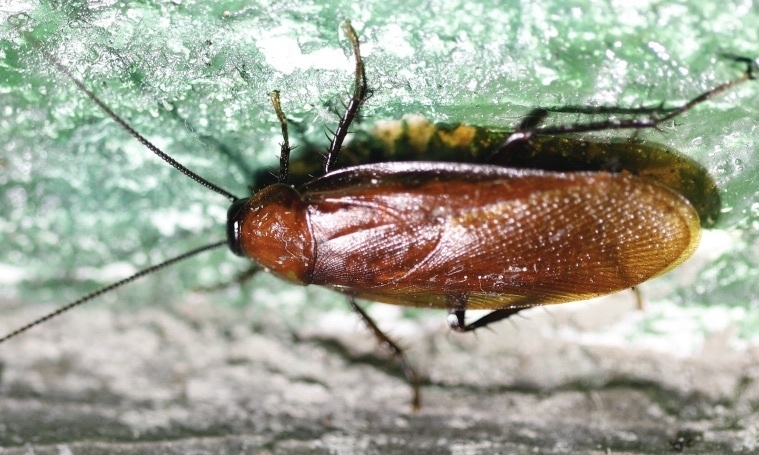
- Pseudoderopeltis sp.

Scientific classification
- Kingdom: Animalia
- Phylum: Arthropoda
- Clade: Pancrustacea
- Class: Insecta
- Order: Blattodea
- Family: Blattidae
- Subfamily: Blattinae
- Genus: Pseudoderopeltis; Krauss, 1890

= Pseudoderopeltis =

Genus of cockroaches

Pseudoderopeltis is a genus of cockroaches in the family Blattidae found principally in sub-Saharan Africa.

== Species ==
The Cockroach Species File lists:

1. Pseudoderopeltis abbreviata Princis, 1963
2. Pseudoderopeltis adelungi Werner, 1907
3. Pseudoderopeltis aethiopica (Saussure, 1864)
4. Pseudoderopeltis albilatera (Stål, 1856)
5. Pseudoderopeltis anthracina (Brancsik, 1896)
6. Pseudoderopeltis areolata Rehn, 1922
7. Pseudoderopeltis bicolor (Thunberg, 1810)
8. Pseudoderopeltis bimaculata (Walker, 1868)
9. Pseudoderopeltis brevicollis (Serville, 1838)
10. Pseudoderopeltis brunneriana (Schulthess, 1898)
11. Pseudoderopeltis caffra (Stål, 1856)
12. Pseudoderopeltis conspersipennis Adelung, 1905
13. Pseudoderopeltis diluta (Stål, 1856)
14. Pseudoderopeltis dimidiata (Walker, 1868)
15. Pseudoderopeltis discrepans Adelung, 1903
16. Pseudoderopeltis dispar Princis, 1963
17. Pseudoderopeltis flavescens Krauss, 1890
18. Pseudoderopeltis foveolata (Walker, 1868)
19. Pseudoderopeltis fulvornata Shelford, 1910
20. Pseudoderopeltis gaerdesi Princis, 1963
21. Pseudoderopeltis gildessa Adelung, 1903
22. Pseudoderopeltis granulifera Krauss, 1890
23. Pseudoderopeltis guttata (Saussure, 1895)
24. Pseudoderopeltis homoeogamia Princis, 1963
25. Pseudoderopeltis inermis Princis, 1963
26. Pseudoderopeltis jeanneli Chopard, 1938
27. Pseudoderopeltis juncea (Saussure, 1864)
28. Pseudoderopeltis lepineyi Hanitsch, 1934
29. Pseudoderopeltis megaloptera Rehn, 1922
30. Pseudoderopeltis microthorax Chopard, 1938
31. Pseudoderopeltis montana Princis, 1963
32. Pseudoderopeltis morosa Shelford, 1911
33. Pseudoderopeltis neavei Princis, 1963
34. Pseudoderopeltis orba (Stål, 1856)
35. Pseudoderopeltis petrophila Shelford, 1910
36. Pseudoderopeltis prorsa Shelford, 1908
37. Pseudoderopeltis rothschildi (Shelford, 1907)
38. Pseudoderopeltis ruandensis Princis, 1955
39. Pseudoderopeltis saussurei Adelung, 1903
40. Pseudoderopeltis simulans Princis, 1951
41. Pseudoderopeltis spectabilis Adelung, 1905
42. Pseudoderopeltis termitoides Rehn, 1922
43. Pseudoderopeltis transvaalensis Rehn, 1922
44. Pseudoderopeltis unicolor Chopard, 1945
45. Pseudoderopeltis versicolor Princis, 1962
