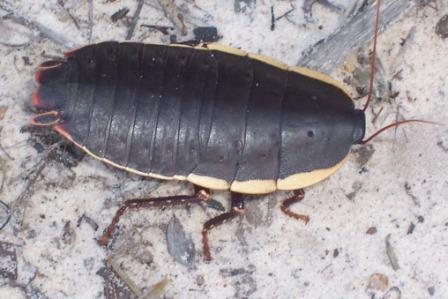
- Giant cockroach, Ku-ring-gai Chase National Park, Australia

Scientific classification
- Kingdom: Animalia
- Phylum: Arthropoda
- Clade: Pancrustacea
- Class: Insecta
- Order: Blattodea
- Family: Blattidae
- Genus: Polyzosteria
- Species: P. limbata

Binomial name
- Polyzosteria limbata Burmeister, 1838

= Polyzosteria limbata =

Botany Bay cockroach

Species of cockroach

Polyzosteria limbata, the Botany Bay cockroach is an insect found in south eastern Australia.
