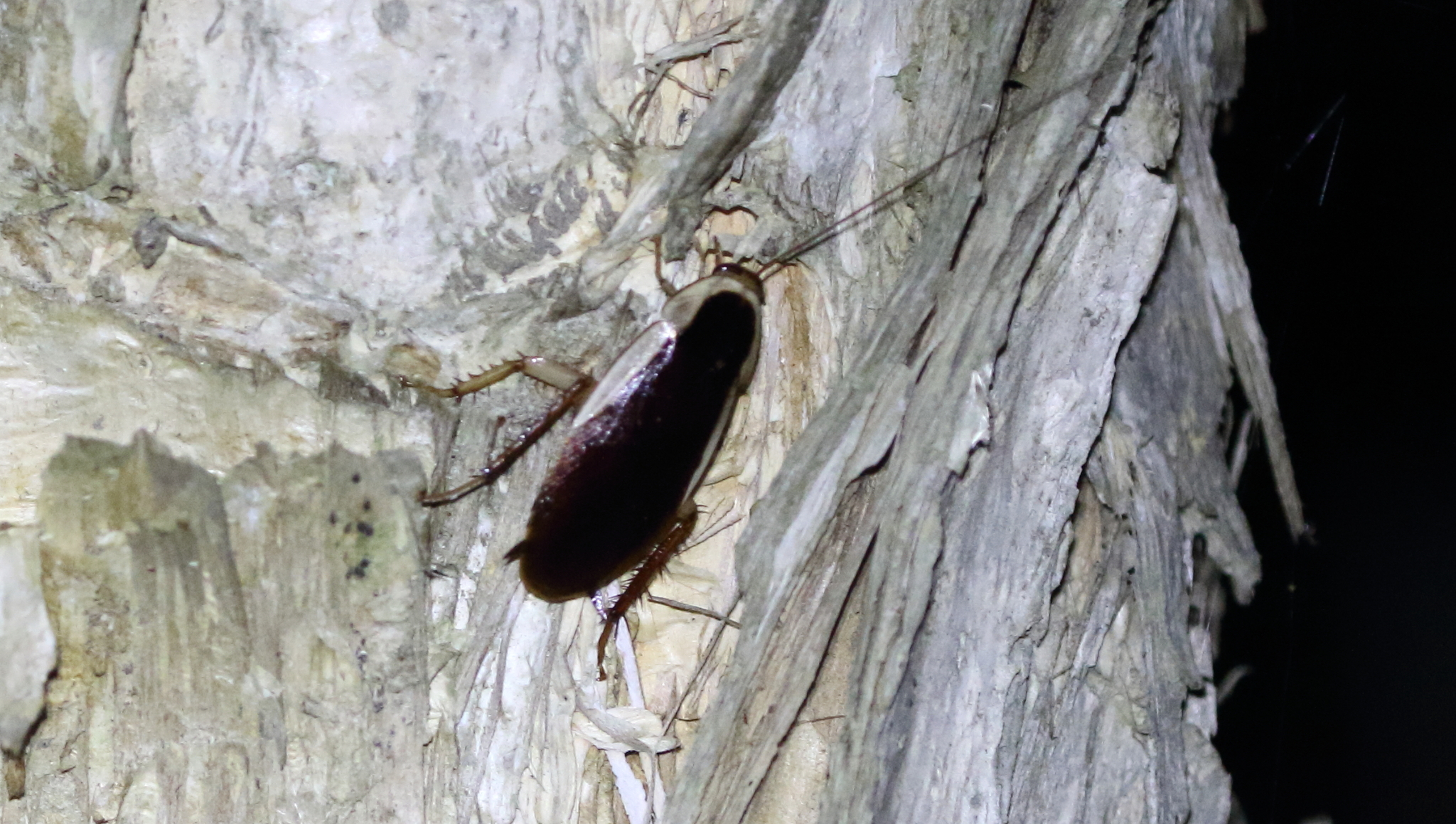
- Methana parva

Scientific classification
- Kingdom: Animalia
- Phylum: Arthropoda
- Class: Insecta
- Order: Blattodea
- Family: Blattidae
- Tribe: Methanini
- Genus: Methana; Stål 1877

Synonyms
- Wodongia Tepper, 1895

= Methana (cockroach) =

Genus of cockroaches

Methana is a genus of cockroaches in the Blattidae family native to eastern Australia and New Guinea.

== Species ==
The following species are recognised:

- Methana athertonensis Mackerras, 1968
- Methana caneae Pope, 1953
- Methana convexa (Walker, 1869)
- Methana curvigera (Walker, 1868)
- Methana hackeri Shaw, 1925
- Methana marginalis (Saussure, 1864)
- Methana mjoebergi Shaw, 1925
- Methana papua Shelford, 1908
- Methana parva Shaw, 1925
- Methana sjoestedti Shaw, 1925
- Methana soror (Saussure, 1864)

== Gallery ==
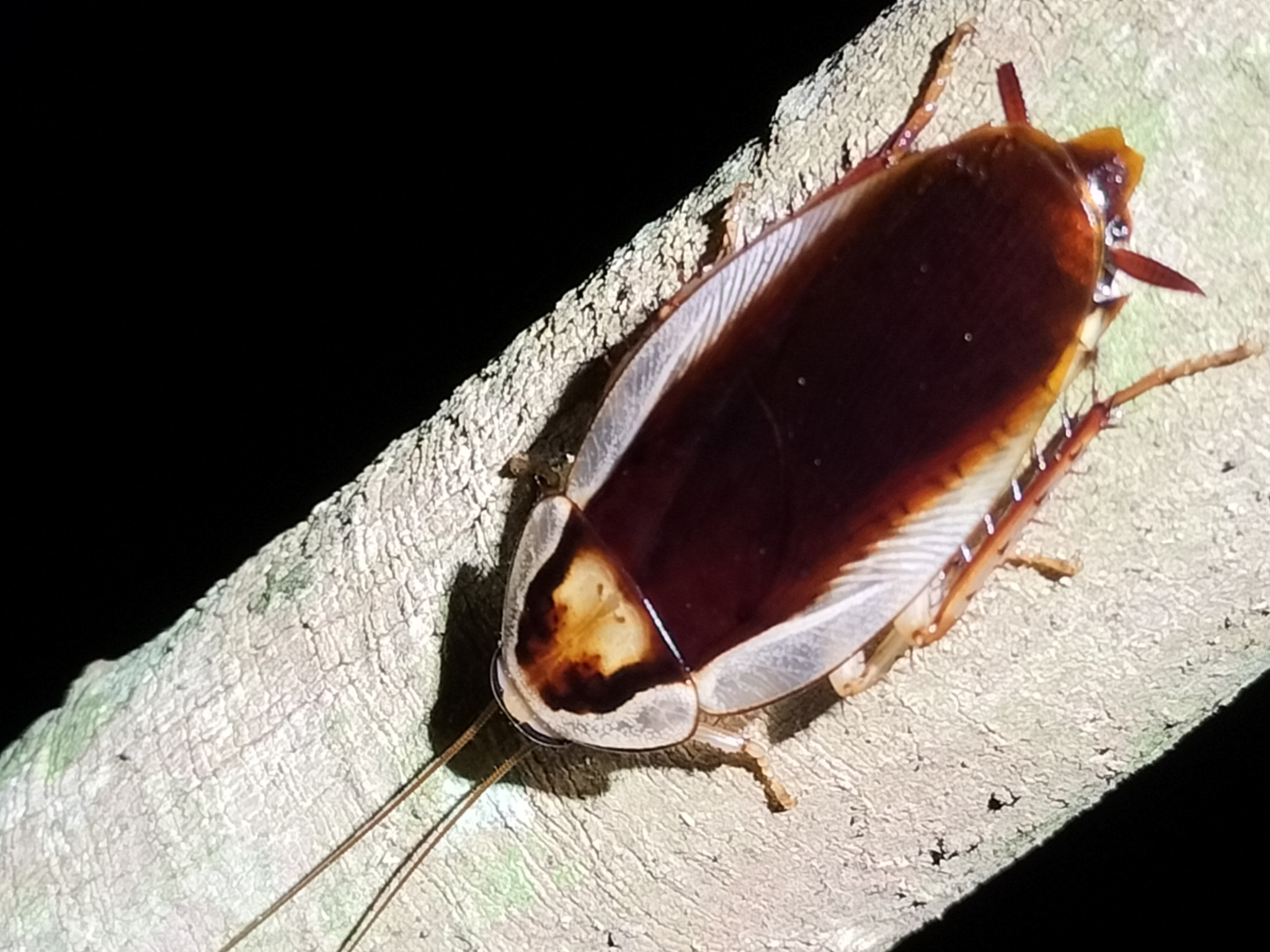
Methana athertonensis

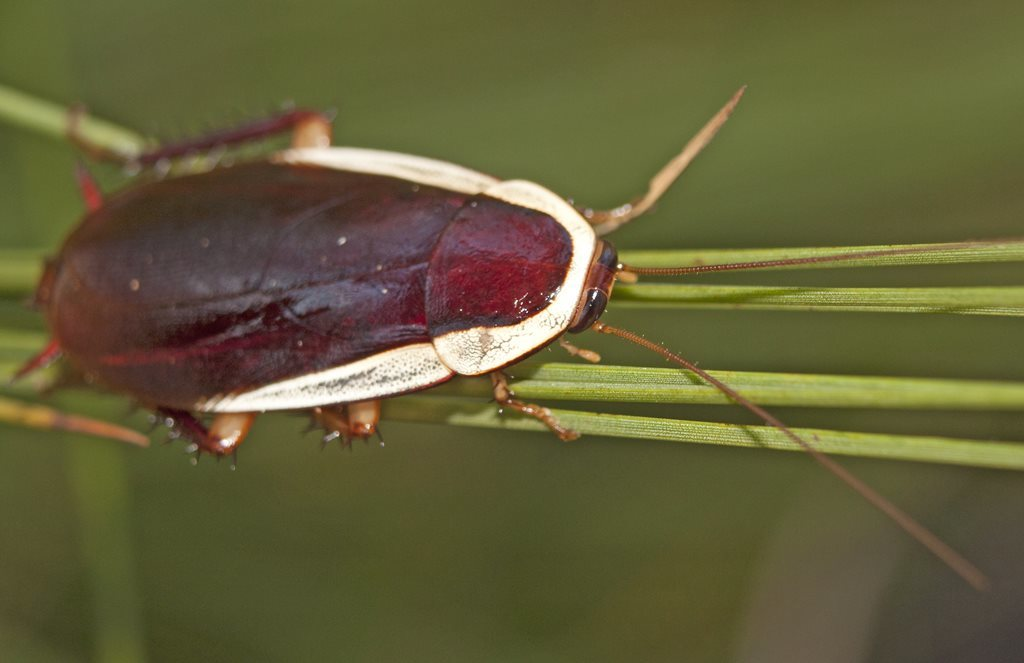
Methana caneae

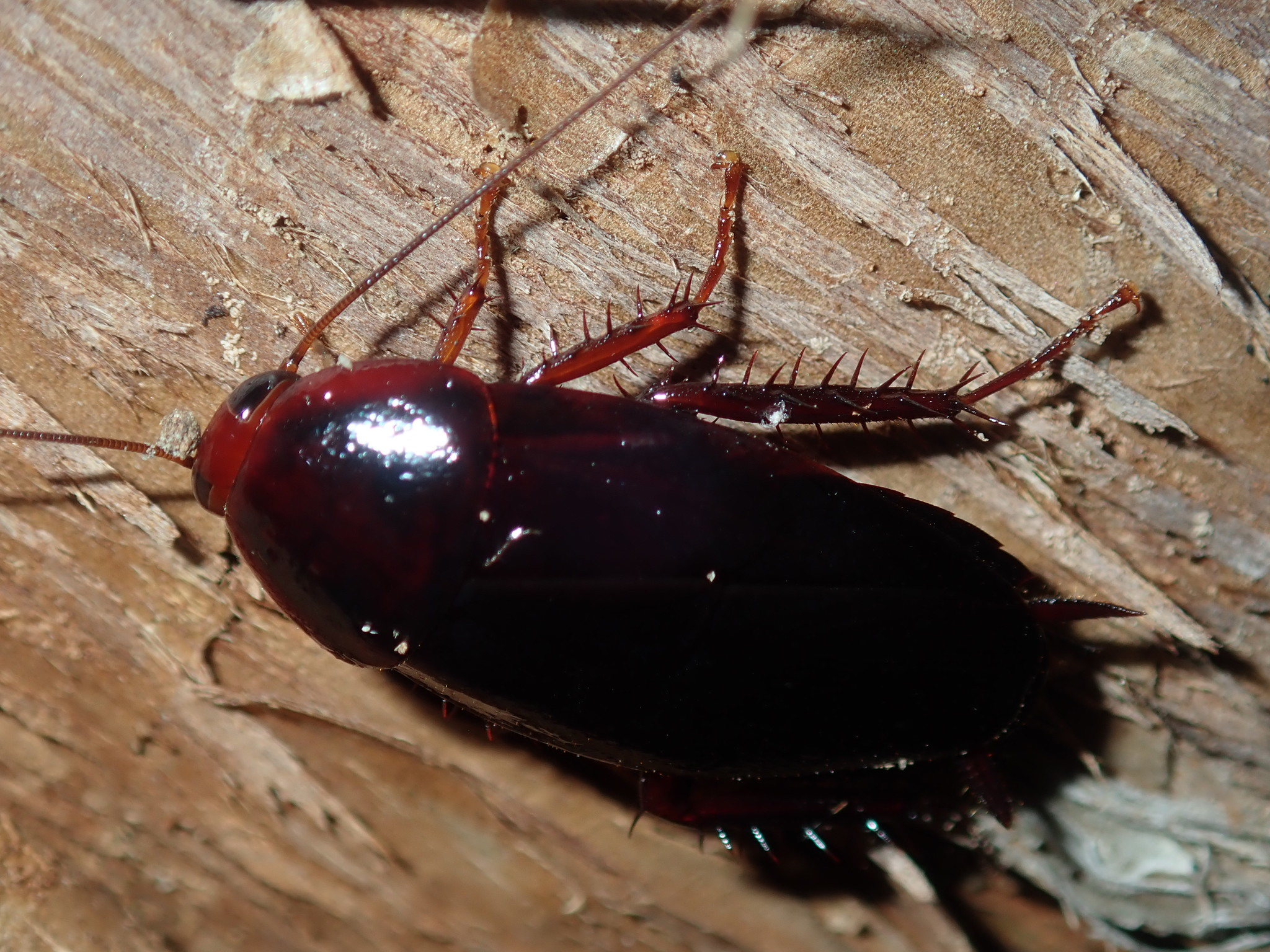
Methana convexa

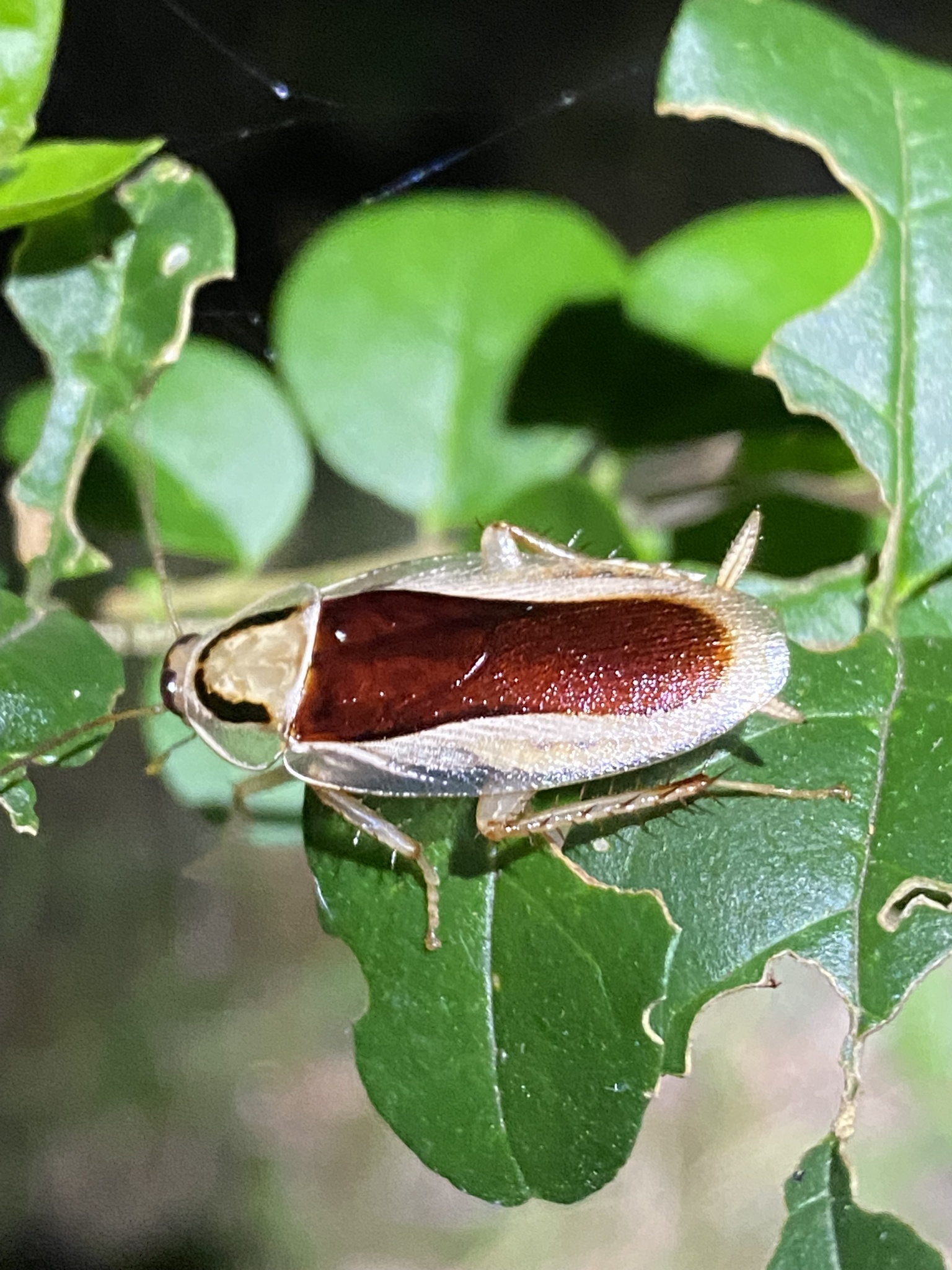
Methana curvigera

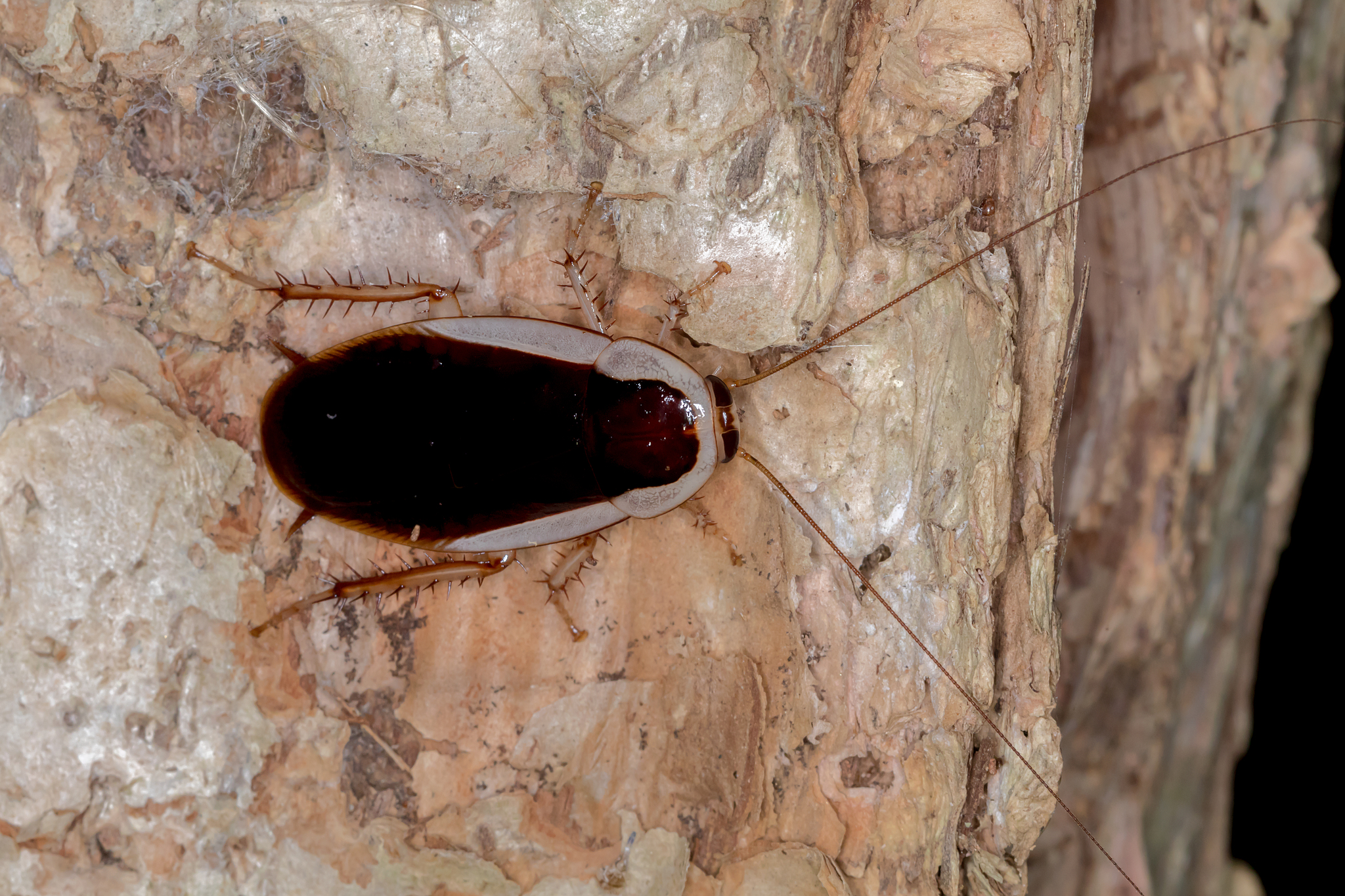
Methana marginalis

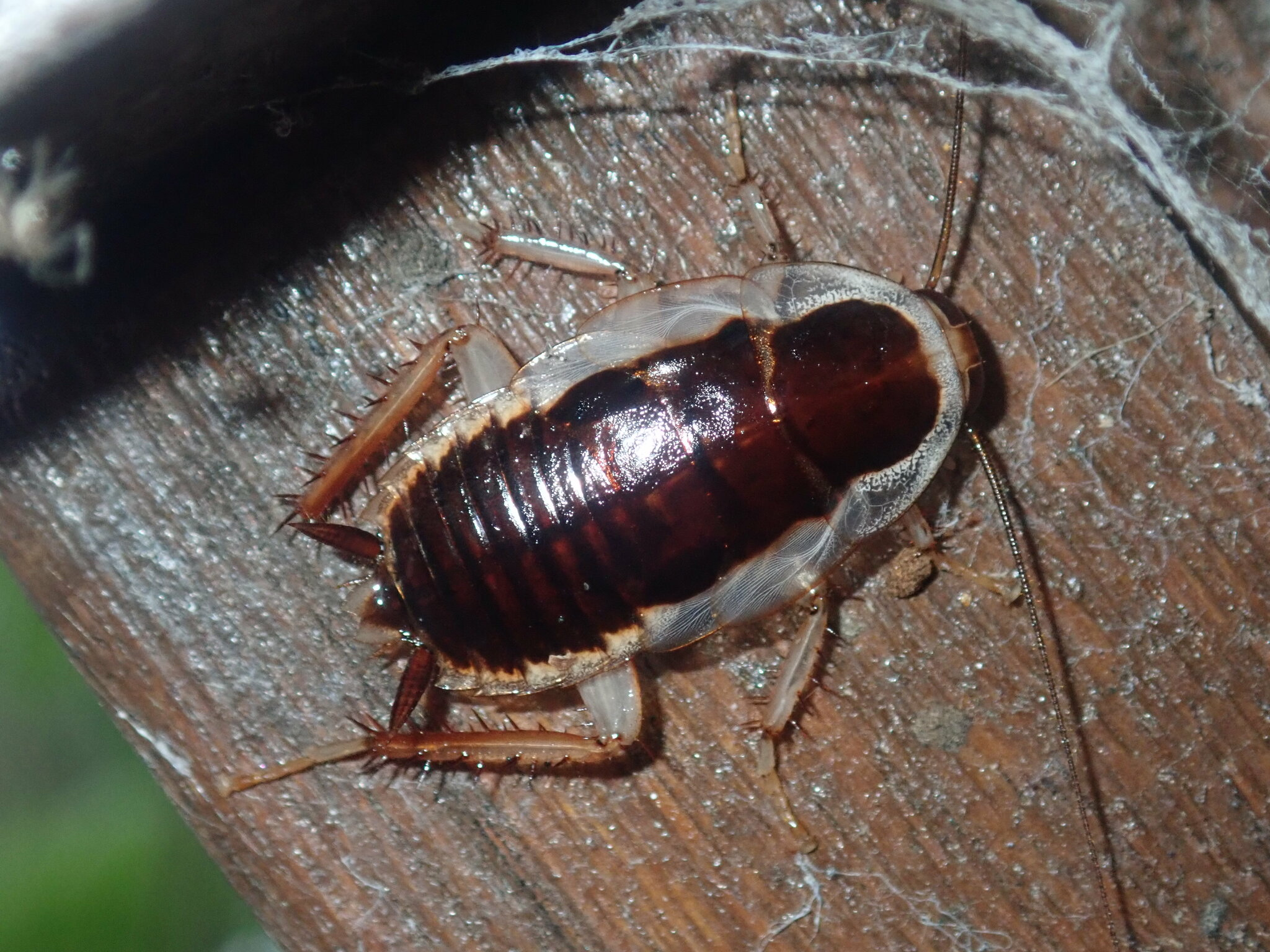
Methana parva

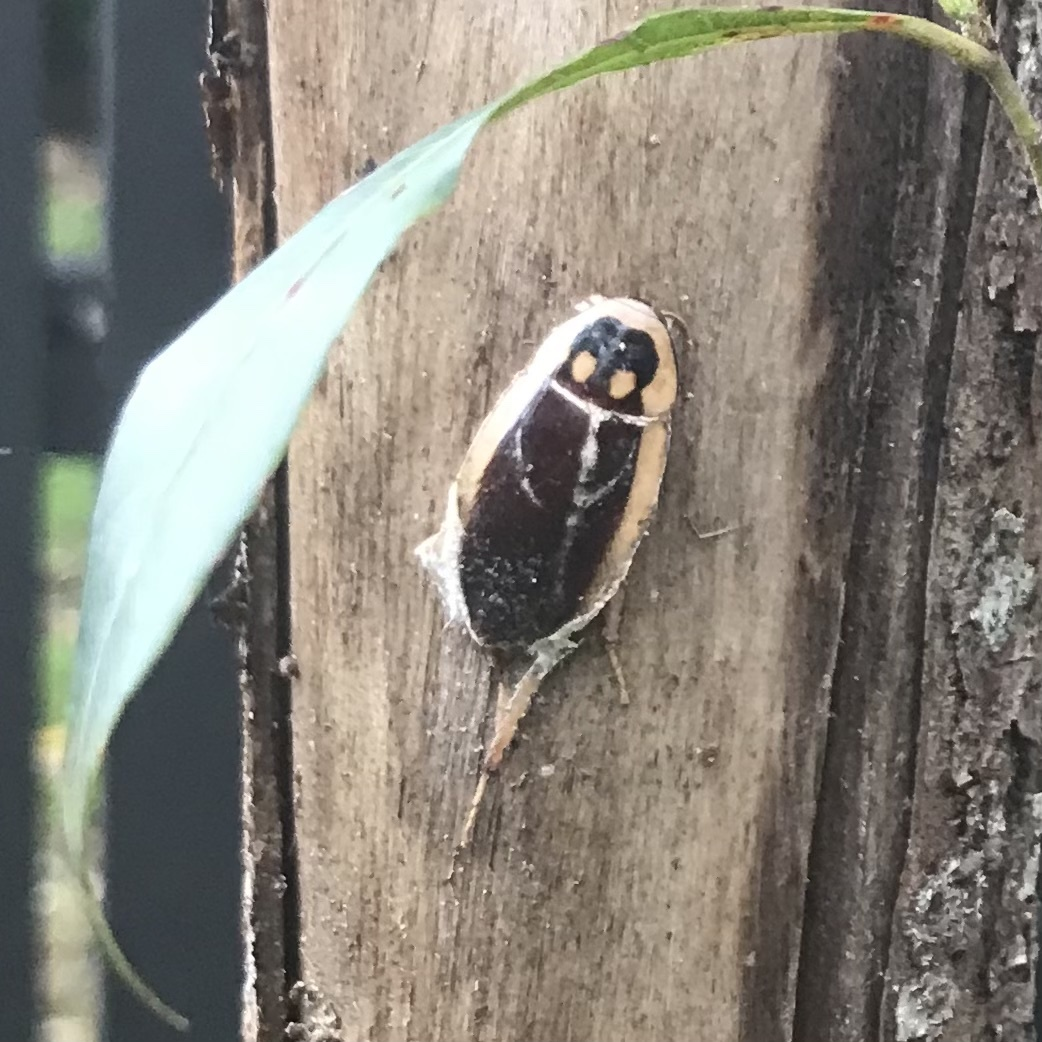
Methana soror
