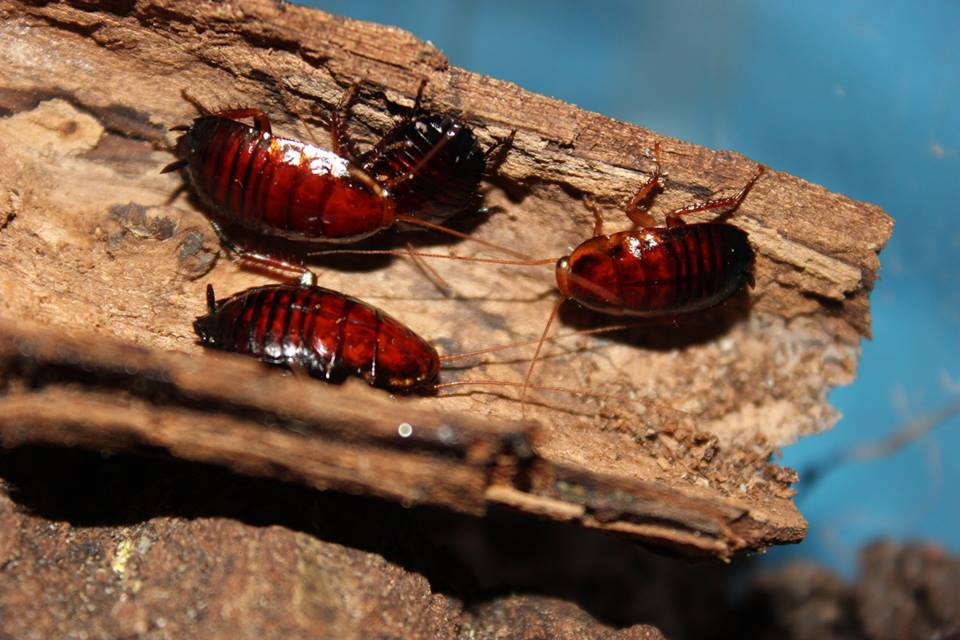
- Eurycotis floridana

Scientific classification
- Kingdom: Animalia
- Phylum: Arthropoda
- Clade: Pancrustacea
- Class: Insecta
- Order: Blattodea
- Family: Blattidae
- Subfamily: Polyzosteriinae
- Genus: Eurycotis; Stål, 1874

Species
- Eurycotis caraibea Eurycotis decipiens Eurycotis floridana Eurycotis lixa Eurycotis opaca Eurycotis tibalis

= Eurycotis =

Genus of cockroaches

Eurycotis is a genus of cockroaches from the Americas. Cockroaches of this genus often have the capability to secrete an unpleasant smell when threatened. Both sexes have a large gland in the rear part of the abdomen capable of secreting a milky, acidic fluid as either an oozing liquid, or up to a three-foot spray.
