= Macrostylopyga =

Scientific classification
- Kingdom: Animalia
- Phylum: Arthropoda
- Clade: Pancrustacea
- Class: Insecta
- Order: Blattodea
- Family: Blattidae
- Subfamily: Blattinae
- Genus: Macrostylopyga; Anisyutkin, Anichkin & Thinh, 2013

Genus of cockroaches

Macrostylopyga Is a genus of South-East Asian cockroaches in the subfamily Blattinae, erected by Leonid Anisyutkin, A.E. Anichkin and N.V. Thinh in 2013. Species have been recorded from Indochina.

== Species ==
The Cockroach Species File lists:

1. Macrostylopyga bidupi Anisyutkin, Anichkin & Thinh, 2013
2. Macrostylopyga grandis Anisyutkin, Anichkin & Thinh, 2013 - type species (by original designation)
3. Macrostylopyga laosana (Anisyutkin, 2010)
