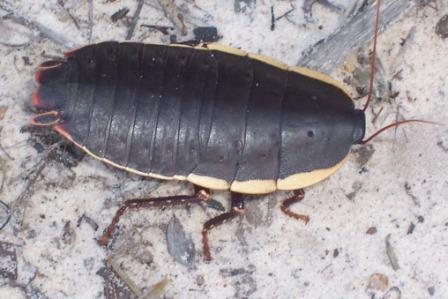
- Botany Bay cockroach

Scientific classification
- Kingdom: Animalia
- Phylum: Arthropoda
- Clade: Pancrustacea
- Class: Insecta
- Order: Blattodea
- Family: Blattidae
- Subfamily: Polyzosteriinae
- Genus: Polyzosteria; Burmeister 1838

= Polyzosteria =

Genus of cockroaches

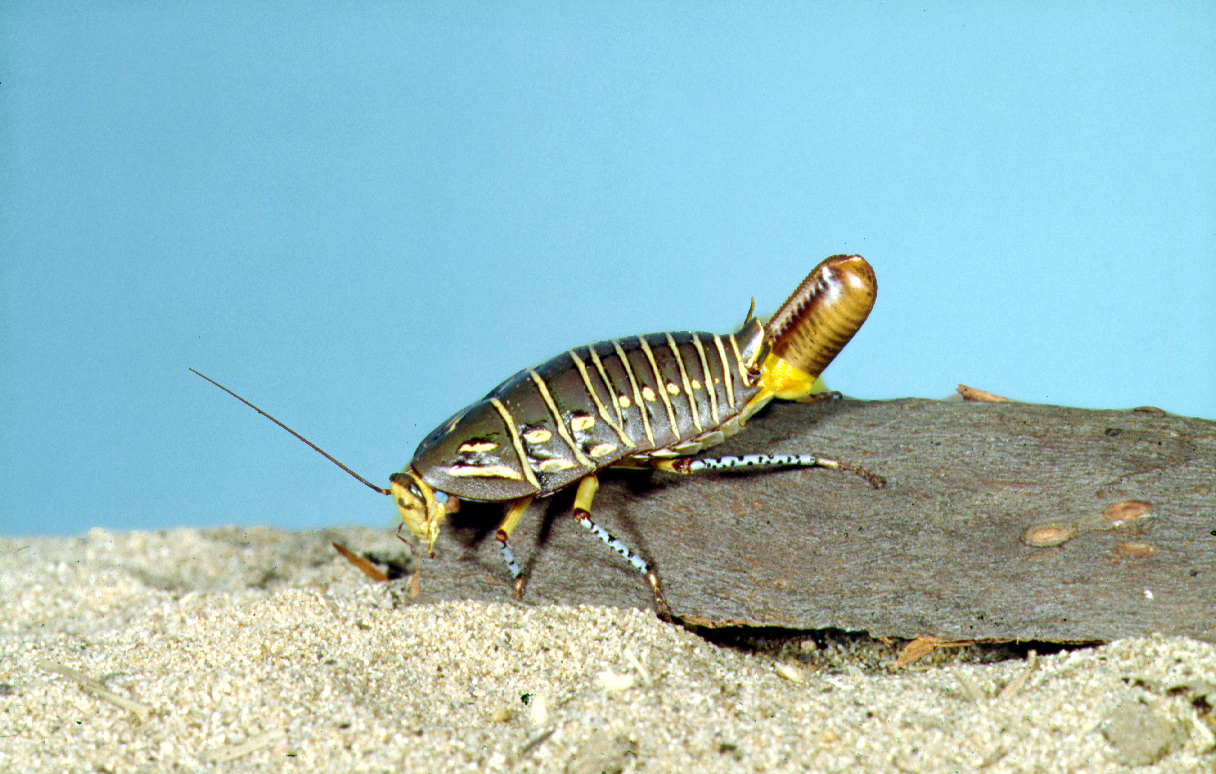
P. mitchelli

Polyzosteria is a genus of around sixteen species of cockroaches in the Blattidae family native to Australia. Some of these insects are attractively marked, such as Polyzosteria mitchelli. The type species of the genus is the Botany Bay cockroach, Polyzosteria limbata.

The genus was first described in 1838 by Hermann Burmeister.

== Species ==
The following species are recognised :

- Polyzosteria aenea Burmeister, 1838
- Polyzosteria australica (Brancsik, 1895)
- Polyzosteria cuprea Saussure, 1863
- Polyzosteria flavomaculosa Mackerras, 1965
- Polyzosteria fulgens Mackerras, 1965
- Polyzosteria invisa Walker, 1868
- Polyzosteria limbata Burmeister, 1838
- Polyzosteria magna Shaw, 1914
- Polyzosteria metallica (Shaw, 1914)
- Polyzosteria mitchelli (Angas, 1847)
- Polyzosteria obscuroviridis Tepper, 1893
- Polyzosteria oculata Tepper, 1893
- Polyzosteria pubescens Tepper, 1893
- Polyzosteria pulchra Mackerras, 1965
- Polyzosteria rouxi Chopard, 1924
- Polyzosteria terrosa Chopard, 1924
- Polyzosteria viridissima Shelford, 1909
- Polyzosteria yingina Henry, 2020
