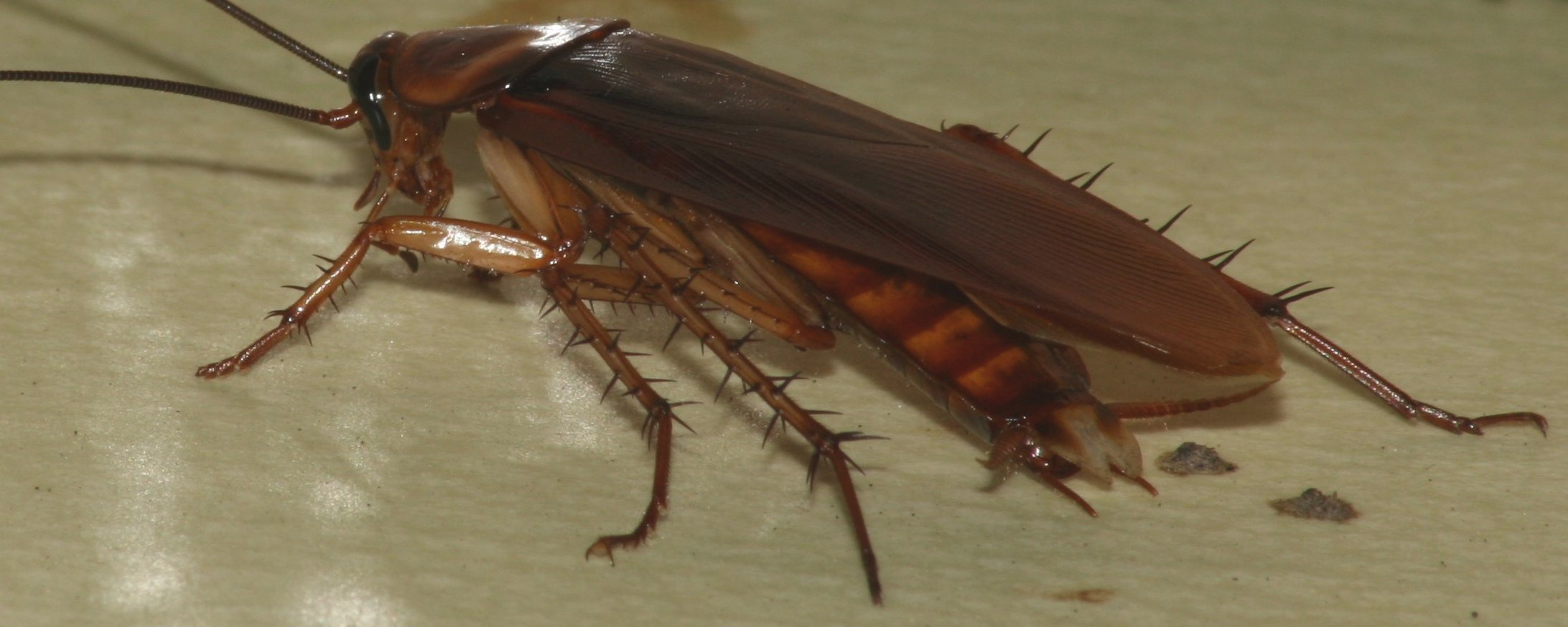
- American cockroach (Periplaneta americana)

Scientific classification
- Kingdom: Animalia
- Phylum: Arthropoda
- Clade: Pancrustacea
- Class: Insecta
- Order: Blattodea
- Epifamily: Blattoidae
- Family: Blattidae; Latreille, 1810

Genera
- See subfamilies and genera

= Blattidae =

Blattidae Temporal range: Late Cretaceous–Recent

Family of cockroaches

Blattidae is a cockroach family in the order Blattodea containing several of the most common household cockroaches. Notable species include:

- Oriental cockroach (Blatta orientalis),
- Common shining cockroach (Drymaplaneta communis),
- Florida woods cockroach (Eurycotis floridana),
- Periplaneta spp:
  - American cockroach (P. americana),
  - Australian cockroach (P. australasiae),
  - Brown cockroach (P. brunnea),
  - Smokybrown cockroach (P. fuliginosa),
  - Turkestan cockroach (P. lateralis),
- Botany Bay cockroach (Polyzosteria limbata)

== Subfamilies and genera ==
=== Archiblattinae ===
Auth. Kirby, 1904; distribution: SE Asia

- Archiblatta Snellen van Vollenhoven, 1862
- Bundoksia Lucañas, 2021
- Catara Walker, 1868
- Protagonista Latreille, 1810

=== Blattinae ===
Auth. Latreille, 1810; distribution: Worldwide; synonym Duchailluiinae Roth, 2003

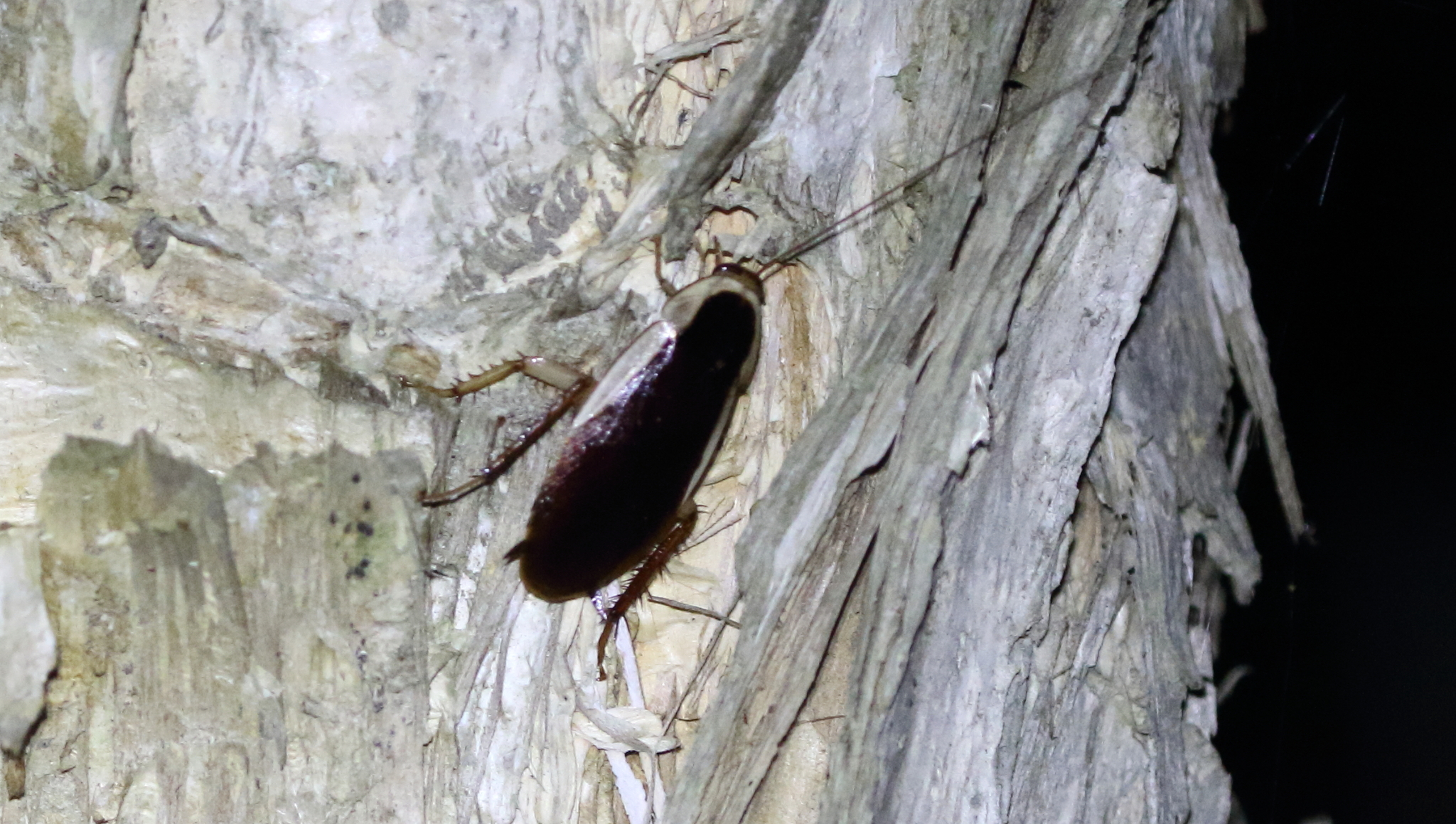
Methana parva

- Afrostylopyga Anisyutkin, 2014
- Apterisca Princis, 1963
- Blatta Linnaeus, 1758
- Brinckella Princis, 1963
- Cartoblatta Shelford, 1910
- Deropeltis Burmeister, 1838
- Distylopyga Bey-Bienko, 1965
- Dorylaea Stål, 1877
- Duchailluia Rehn, 1933
- Eroblatta Shelford, 1910
- Eumethana Princis, 1951
- Hebardina Bei-Bienko, 1938
- Henicotyle Rehn & Hebard, 1927
- Homalosilpha Stål, 1874
- Macrostylopyga Anisyutkin, Anichkin & Thinh, 2013
- Maoriblatta Princis, 1966
- Mimosilpha Bei-Bienko, 1957
- Miostylopyga Princis, 1966
- Neostylopyga Shelford, 1911
- Pelmatosilpha Dohrn, 1887
- Periplaneta Burmeister, 1838 (synonym Shelfordella Adelung, 1910)
- Pseudoderopeltis Krauss, 1890
- Scabinopsis Bei-Bienko, 1969
- Thyrsocera Burmeister, 1838
- †Bubosa Šmídová, 2020 Burmese amber, Myanmar, Cenomanian

=== Macrocercinae ===
Auth. Roth, 1993; distribution: Australasia

- Macrocerca Hanitsch, 1930

=== Polyzosteriinae ===
Auth. Tepper, 1893; distribution: central & South America, Pacific islands, Australasia

- Anamesia Tepper, 1893
- Celatoblatta Johns, 1966
- Cosmozosteria Stål, 1874
- Desmozosteria Shelford, 1909
- Drymaplaneta Tepper, 1893
- Eppertia Shaw, 1925
- Eurycotis Stål, 1874
- Euzosteria Shelford, 1909
- Laevifaciesquadrialata Liao, Wang & Che, 2019
- Leptozosteria Tepper, 1893
- Megazosteria Mackerras, 1966
- Melanozosteria Stål, 1874
- Methana Stål, 1877
- Platyzosteria Brunner von Wattenwyl, 1865
- Polyzosteria Burmeister, 1838
- Pseudolampra Tepper, 1893
- Scabina Shelford, 1909
- Temnelytra Tepper, 1893
- Zonioploca Stål, 1874
