= List of cockroach species from Australia =

List of native cockroach species from Australia

Cockroaches (or roaches) are insects belonging to the order Blattodea (Blattaria). There are up to 550 described species of native cockroaches in Australia. This is a list of cockroach species from Australia.

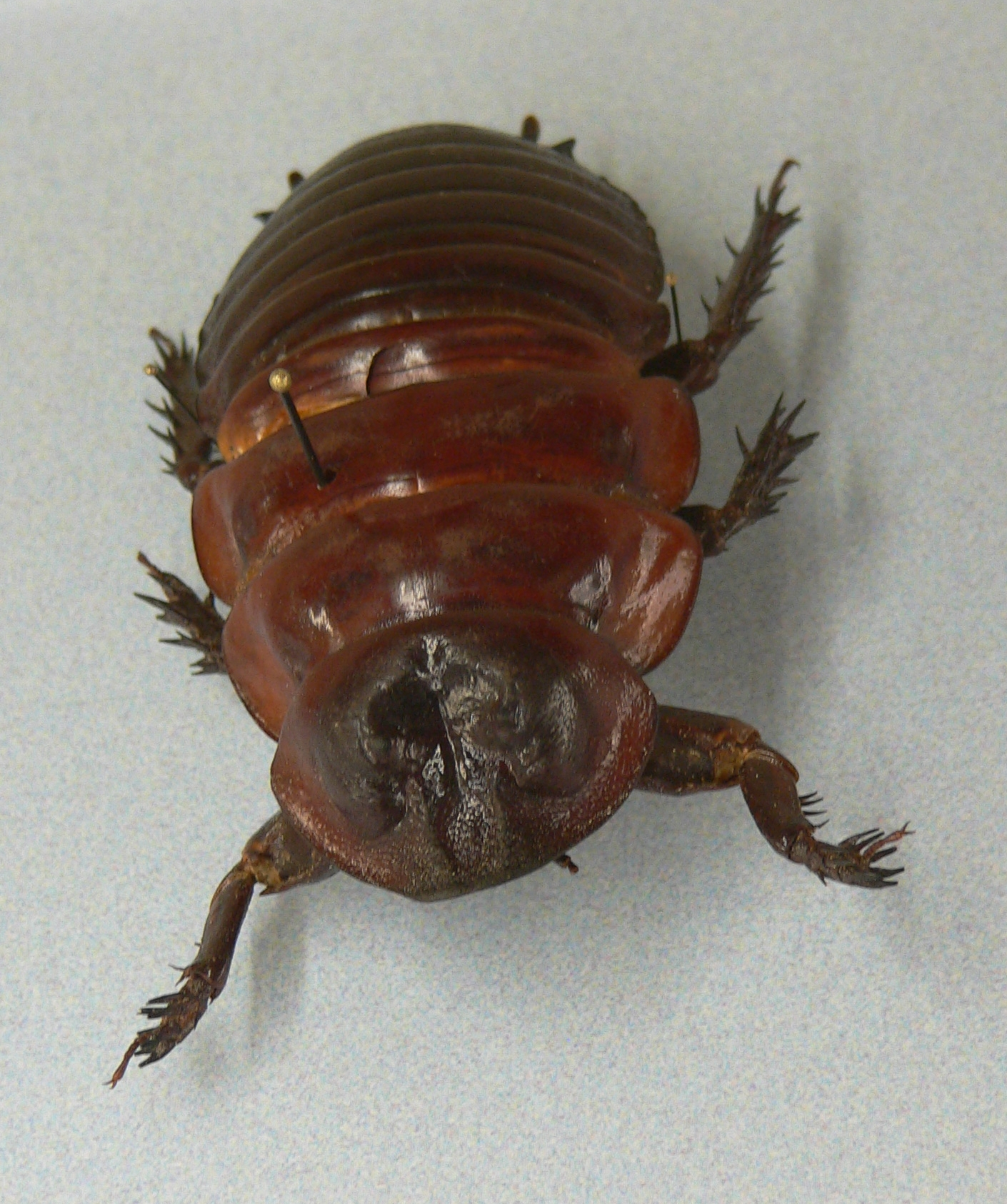
The giant burrowing cockroach

== Native cockroaches ==
=== Giant burrowing cockroach ===
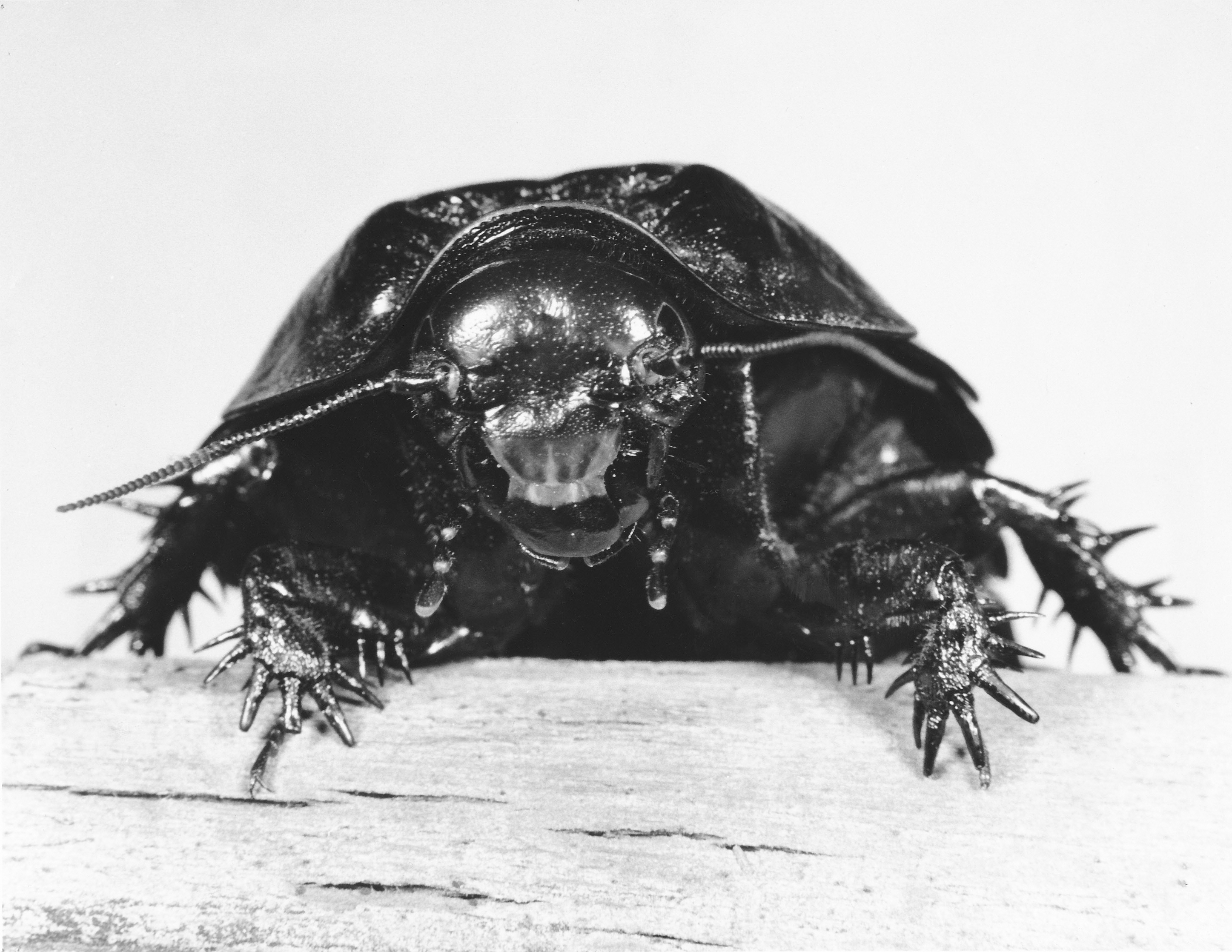
Black and white image of the Macropanesthia rhinoceros

The giant burrowing cockroach (Macropanesthia rhinoceros, also known as the rhinoceros cockroach and Queensland giant cockroach) is a large cockroach species native to Australia. The cockroach species is found mostly tropical and subtropical parts of Queensland. They are the world's heaviest species of cockroach and can weigh up to 30-35 grams and measure up to 7.5-8 cm (3.1 in) in length. It is a member of the family Blaberidae, which contains hundreds of species. It is part of the blaberid subfamily Geoscapheinae. The cockroach species make permanent homes as being 1 meter or 3 feet underground and feed on collected dry leaf litter. The giant burrowing cockroach is the only cockroach in the world known to have permanent burrows in the soil. The cockroach species is sold and kept as a pet since they are not pests and don't spread dangerous viruses just like introduced cockroach species like the American cockroach.

=== Macropanesthia ===
Macropanesthia is a genus of cockroaches belonging to the family Blaberidae. The species of this genus are found in Malesia to Australia. This type of species is related to the Giant burrowing cockroach found in Queensland, Australia.

=== Common shining cockroach ===
The common shining cockroach (Drymaplaneta communis) is a cockroach native to south-east Australia. It feeds on organic matter and is often found under the bark of eucalypt trees. During the late 1990s and 2000s, this cockroach appears to have had a population explosion in Sydney and Melbourne and is commonly found inside houses. This population increase likely coincides with an extended dry period, where many suburban gardeners added mulch to their gardens which provided a habitat for the common shining cockroach. Despite the common shining cockroach commonly being found inside houses, it does not pose the same health risk as introduced cockroaches like the American cockroach.

=== Polyzosteria mitchelli ===
Polyzosteria mitchelli (also known as Mitchell's diurnal cockroach or Mardi Gras cockroach) is a native species of bush cockroach found in Australia. The cockroach species colour has a type of Green, yellow, greyish and brownish colour on its body and it is wingless so it is not capable of flying. Its typical habitat is semi-arid areas of Australia's warm temperate zone such as New South Wales, South Australia, and Western Australia.

=== Ellipsidion australe ===
Ellipsidion australe, (or the eastern ellipsidion, or bush cockroach) is a species of cockroach native to Australia and is found in New South Wales, the Northern Territory, Queensland, and Victoria. The cockroach species colour has a type of light brown or dark yellow colour on its body with the colour brown.

=== Polyzosteria limbata ===
Polyzosteria limbata (also known as the Botany Bay cockroach) is a native species of cockroach in Australia. The cockroach species colour is mostly black with a bit of white on the sides of its body.

=== Drymaplaneta semivitta ===
Drymaplaneta semivitta is a cockroach species native to Australia but was introduced into New Zealand. In New Zealand, the Drymaplaneta semivitta is called the Gisborne cockroach due to it being introduced and first discovered in Gisborne. The cockroach species colour mostly has a black body and a yellowish whitish colour on the front sides of its body.

=== Polyzosteria cuprea ===
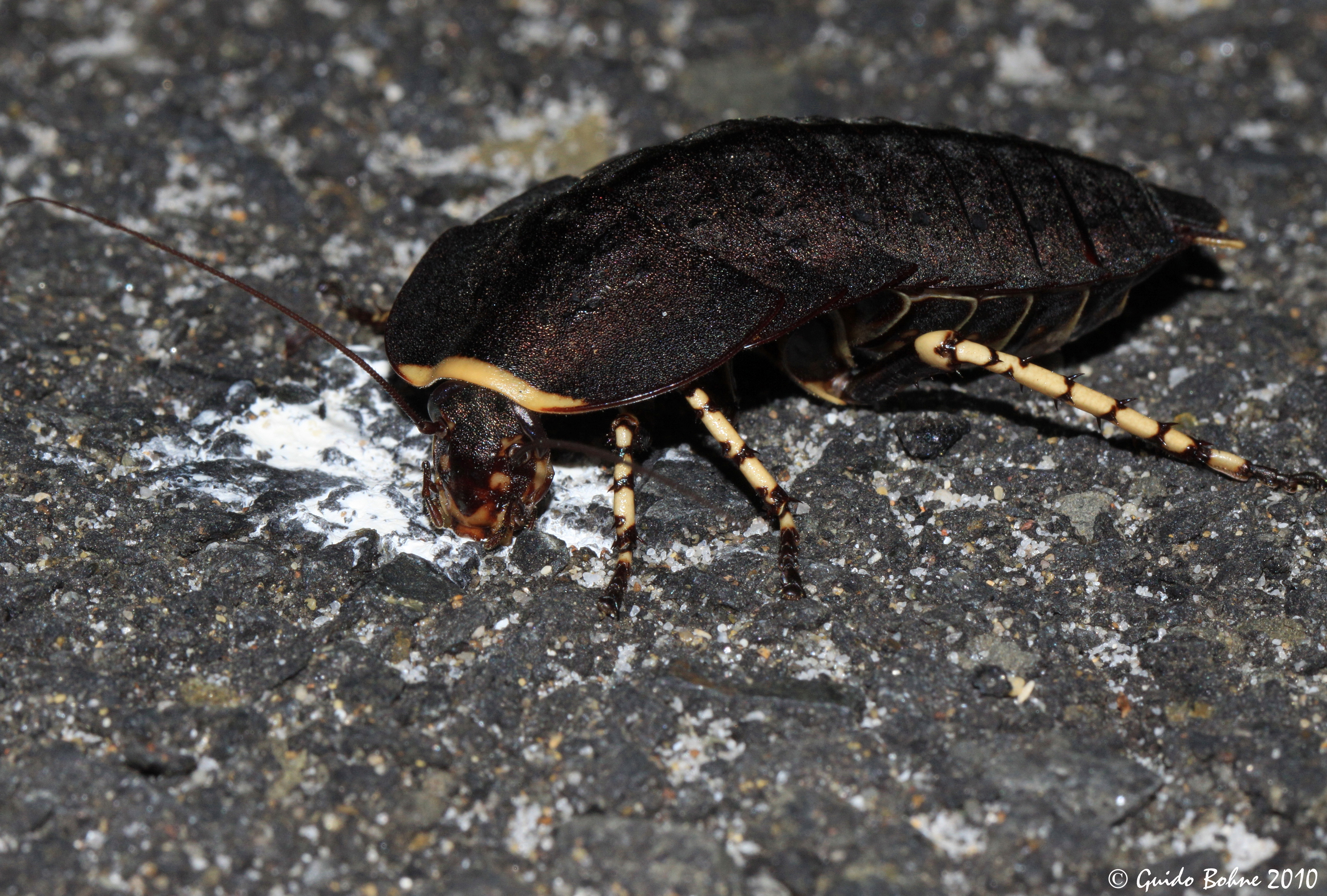
Polyzosteria cuprea

Polyzosteria cuprea is a wingless, dorsally-flattened, charcoal-grey insect native to Australia. There is a large, cream-coloured patch at the front of the tergum (dorsal plate) of the prothorax, smaller white markings on the sides of the next two terga, and white markings on the legs.

=== Polyzosteria pubescens ===
Polyzosteria pubescens is a rare, day-active native Australian bush cockroach species belonging to the family Blattidae and the distinctive, colorful genus Polyzosteria, originally described by entomologist J.G.O. Tepper in 1893. The cockroach species colour is entirely black and looks a bit like a grey rock.

=== Polyzosteria yingina ===
Polyzosteria yingina is a bush cockroach that can only be found in Tasmania. It was first described in 2020 by Shasta Henry and others. The name yingina comes from an indigenous name Great Lake from the Central Highlands region. The cockroach species colour is entirely greyish black.

=== Panesthia lata ===
Panesthia lata (also known as the Lord Howe Island wood-feeding cockroach or Lord Howe Island cockroach) is a large, wingless cockroach species endemic to the Lord Howe Island Group in the Tasman Sea. This cockroach species eats on leaf litter and wood. The cockroach species colour is entirely black and has a unique ridge parts on its body.

=== Panesthia cribrata ===
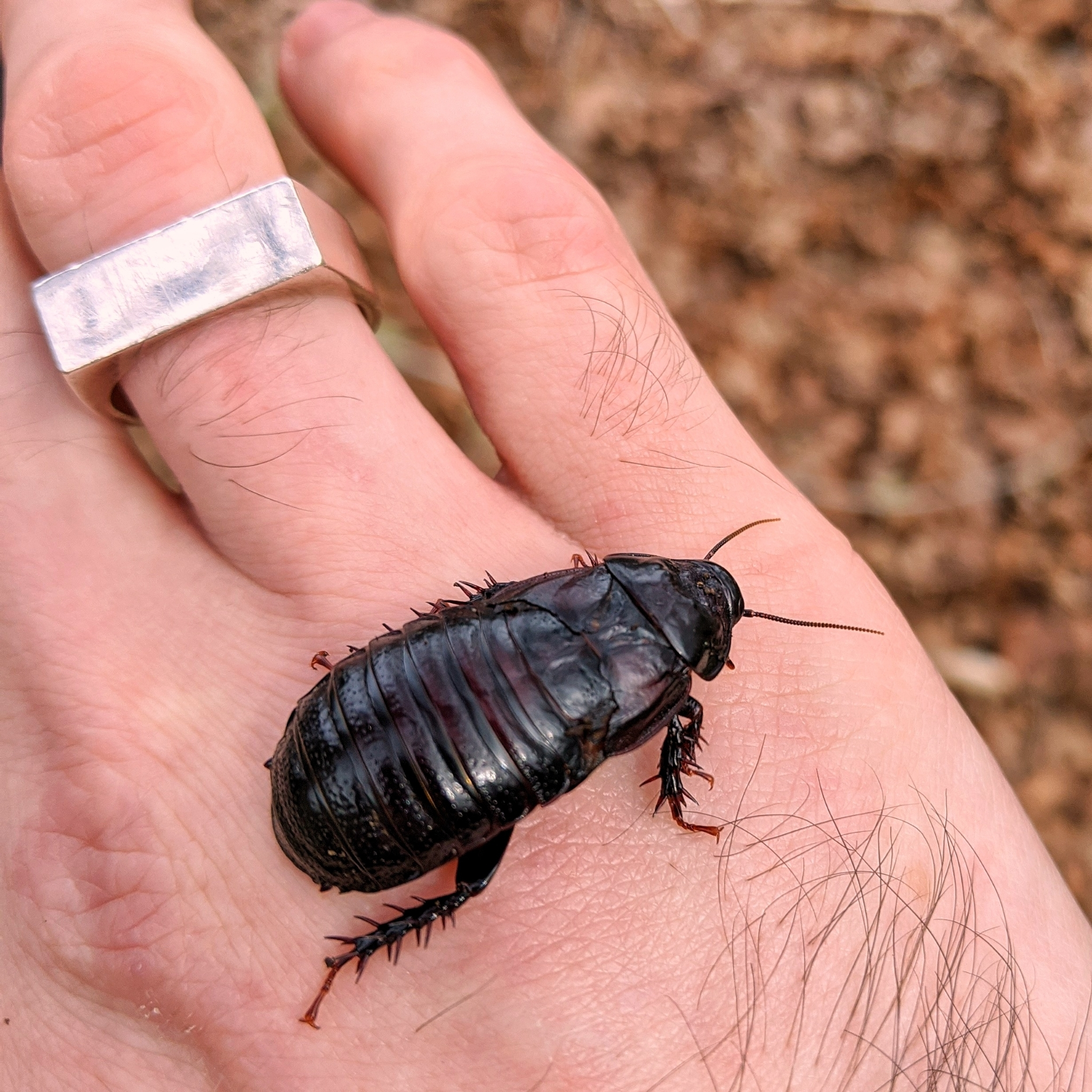
Panesthia cribrata

Panesthia cribrata, commonly called the Australian wood cockroach, is a wood-eating species found in rotten logs. It is found from south east Queensland south to the east coast to Tasmania, and is also seen at Norfolk Island. The cockroach species colour is entirely black.

=== Panesthia australis ===
Panesthia australis, colloquially called the Australian wood cockroach (just like the Panesthia cribrata) or the common wood cockroach, is a species of giant cockroach endemic to Australia. The cockroach species colour is entirely black.

=== Panesthia obtusa ===
Panesthia obtusa is a rare, heavy-bodied native wood-eating cockroach belonging to the family Blaberidae. Like other members of the genus Panesthia, it lives inside decaying logs and decomposing forest timber along the eastern regions of Australia, utilizing specialized gut micro-organisms to break down and digest plant cellulose. The cockroach species colour is entirely black and has a unique ridge pattern.

=== Drymaplaneta lobipennis ===
Drymaplaneta lobipennis is a rare, flightless native Australian cockroach belonging to the family Blattidae and subfamily Polyzosteriinae. First described by entomologist Karl Princis in 1954, this uniform dark-coloured outdoor dweller is distinguished by reduced, lobe-like wing remnants (tegmina) and a complete lack of functional hind wings.

=== Drymaplaneta heydeniana ===
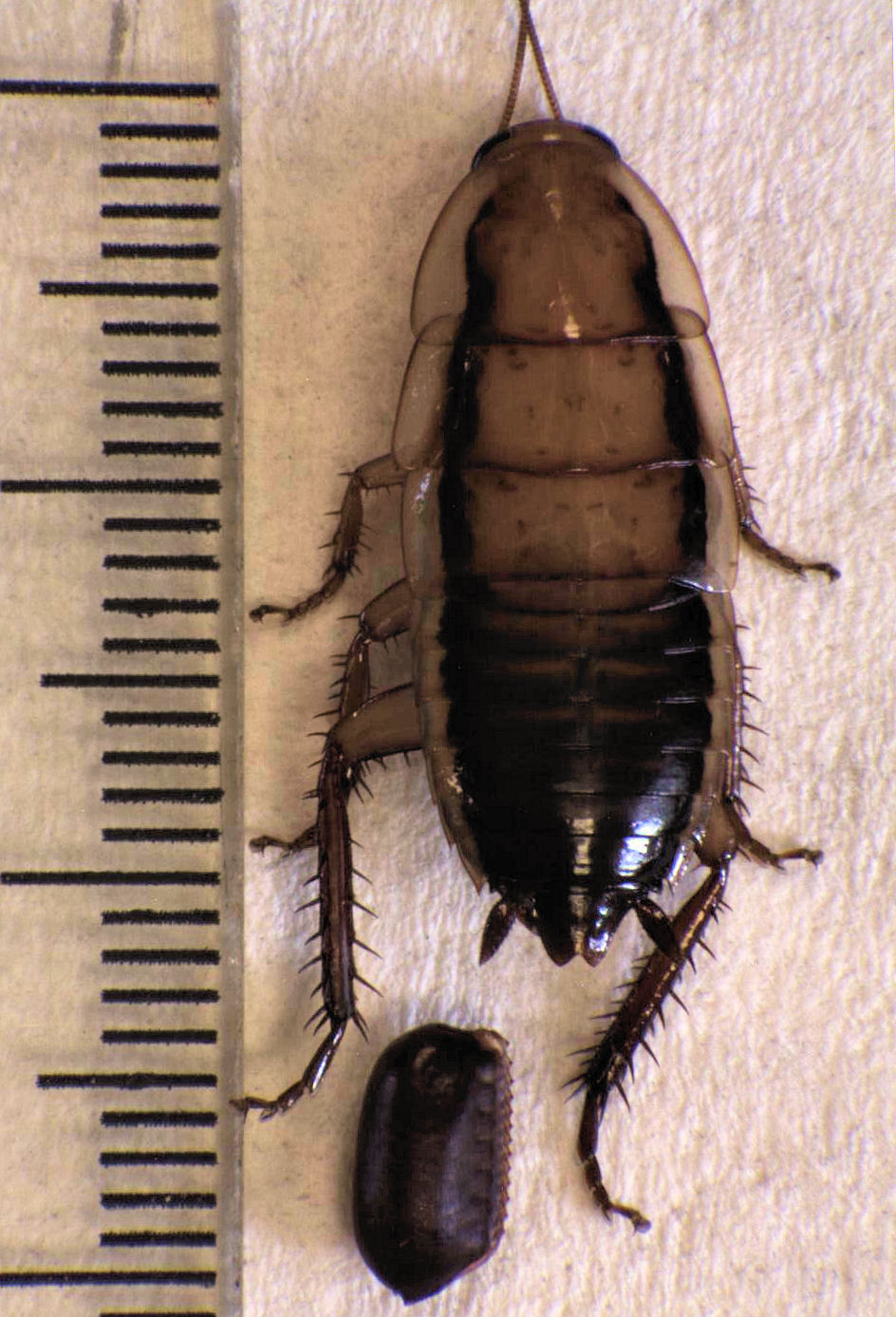
Drymaplaneta heydeniana (female)

Drymaplaneta heydeniana, commonly referred to as a golden cockroach or shining wood runner, is a distinctive wingless or small-lobed native Australian cockroach species endemic to Western Australia that occasionally wanders into human dwellings without acting as a destructive household pest.

=== Drymaplaneta variegata ===
Drymaplaneta variegata is a native Australian wood runner cockroach belonging to the family Blattidae. It is an outdoor-dwelling, wingless insect naturally found in southwestern Western Australia, where it hides under loose bark and decaying plant matter. Completely harmless to humans, it does not infest food or transmit diseases.

=== Methana marginalis ===
Methana marginalis (also known as the common methana and the bush cockroach) is a species of cockroach native to the Queensland coast of Australia. The species was first described as Periplaneta marginalis by Henri Louis Frédéric de Saussure in 1864. The species was introduced to Norfolk Island in the mid-to-late 20th century, first seen in New Zealand in the 2020s, and in the 21st century has increasingly been seen in the southeastern Australia.

=== Methana curvigera ===
Methana curvigera, commonly known as the U-marked Methana cockroach, is a striking native Australian insect belonging to the family Blattidae. Unlike the vast majority of traditional wood-dwelling cockroach relatives in its family, members of the Methana genus possess fully functional wings as adults and spend time moving between ground debris and arboreal foliage.

=== Balta bicolor ===
Balta bicolor is a type of cockroach from the genus Balta, and is native to eastern Australia. The species has been identified in New Zealand since 2009.

=== Balta spuria ===
Balta spuria is a species of cockroach, indigenous to Australia. The cockroach species colour is reddish and has a gold look to it.

=== Balta epilamproides ===
Balta epilamproides is a small native Australian bush cockroach described by entomologist Johann Tepper in 1893. Belonging to the family Ectobiidae, it lives outdoors in leaf litter and garden foliage, playing an important ecological role as a decomposer rather than acting as a household pest.

=== Balta scripta ===
Balta scripta is a small, winged native bush cockroach belonging to the family Ectobiidae and the genus Balta, which comprises dozens of harmless species widely distributed across Australian leaf litter and vegetation.

=== Johnrehnia capitata ===
Johnrehnia capitata is a small, harmless native Australian bush cockroach belonging to the family Ectobiidae and subfamily Blattellinae. Formally described as part of a major revision of the Johnrehnia genus by Louis M. Roth in 2000, this foliage-dwelling insect lives strictly outdoors in Australian woodlands and shrublands, feeding harmlessly on plant material, fungi, and pollen.

=== Johnrehnia australiae ===
Johnrehnia australiae, commonly known as Rehn's cockroach, is a small, fully winged native bush cockroach belonging to the family Ectobiidae. It lives harmlessly outdoors in Australian woodlands and shrublands, feeding on organic matter like pollen and microscopic fungi without any tendency to infest homes.

=== Johnrehnia concisa ===
Johnrehnia concisa is a small, harmless native Australian bush cockroach belonging to the family Ectobiidae. Found across woodland and shrubland habitats, this non-pest species feeds quietly on organic matter like decaying plant material and pollen, playing a positive role in local bushland decomposition processes.

=== Ectoneura minima ===
Ectoneura minima, commonly known as the striped Ectoneura, is a tiny native Australian bush cockroach belonging to the family Ectobiidae. Completely harmless to humans, this diminutive woodland and garden dweller lives strictly outdoors, feeding on decaying organic matter and pollen rather than infesting human dwellings or pantries.

=== Ectoneura hanitschi ===
Ectoneura hanitschi is a tiny native Australian bush cockroach belonging to the family Ectobiidae. Originally described in the 1930s, this elusive, miniature insect lives strictly in natural outdoor habitats like leaf litter and foliage, remaining entirely harmless to human dwellings.

=== Ectoneura pallidula ===
Ectoneura pallidula is a small, pale-brown native Australian bush cockroach belonging to the family Ectobiidae. Formally described by entomologist Morgan Hebard in 1943, this harmless, non-pest dwelling insect lives quietly outdoors among garden foliage, bark, and regional shrublands.

=== Allacta ===
Allacta is a genus cockroaches in the subfamily Pseudophyllodromiinae, found in south-east Asia and Australia.
