= Australian wood cockroach =

Australian wood cockroach is a common name that may refer to:

- Panesthia cribrata, found at Norfolk Island and from south east Queensland south to the east coast to Tasmania
- Panesthia australis, found in Eastern Australia, especially in New South Wales
