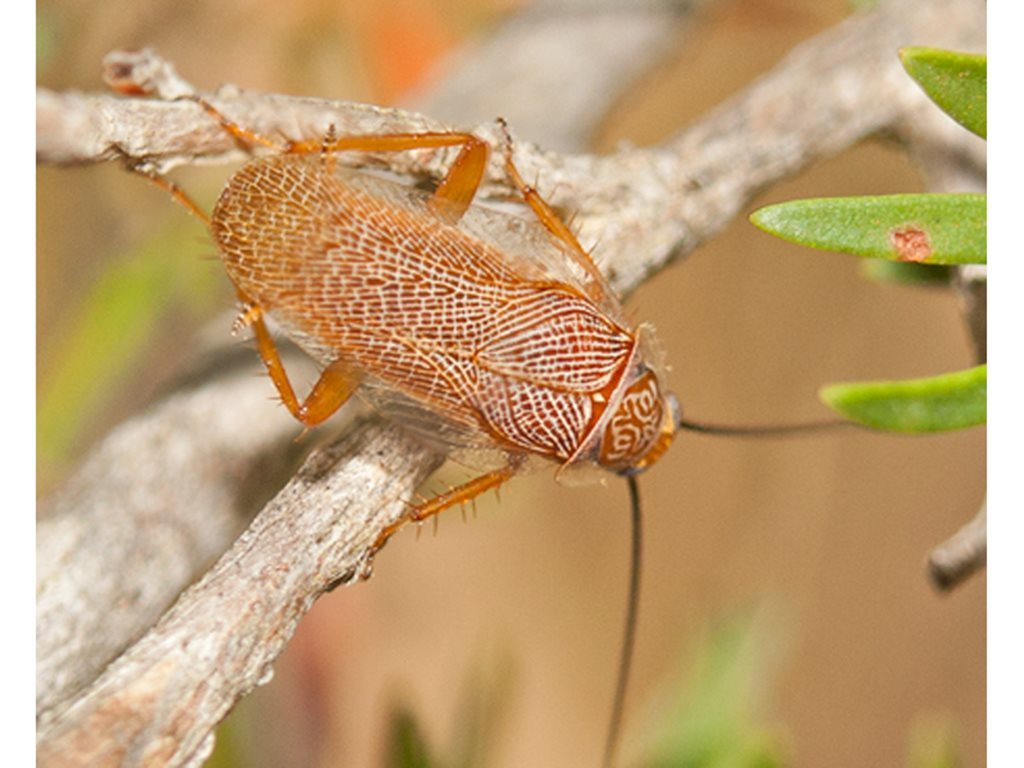

Scientific classification
- Kingdom: Animalia
- Phylum: Arthropoda
- Clade: Pancrustacea
- Class: Insecta
- Order: Blattodea
- Family: Ectobiidae
- Genus: Balta
- Species: B. yorkensis

Binomial name
- Balta yorkensis Hebard, 1943

= Balta yorkensis =

Species of insect

Balta yorkensis is a species of cockroach in the family Ectobiidae.
