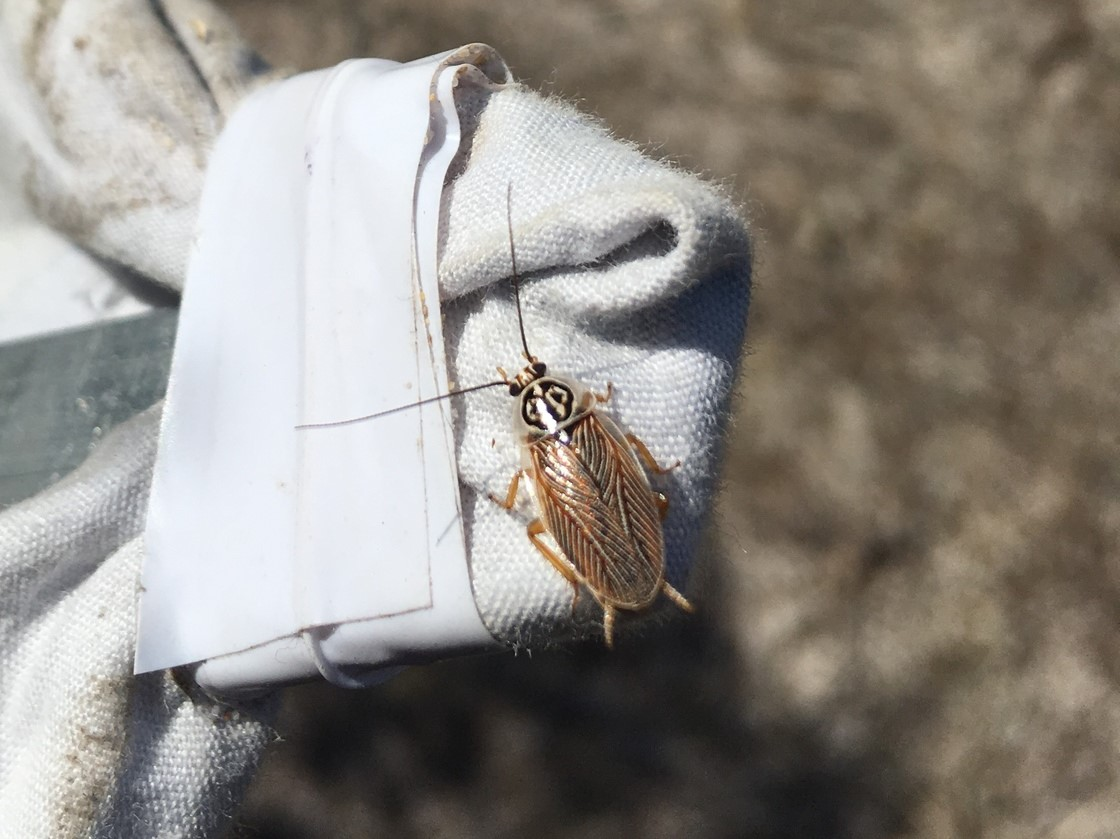

Scientific classification
- Kingdom: Animalia
- Phylum: Arthropoda
- Clade: Pancrustacea
- Class: Insecta
- Order: Blattodea
- Family: Ectobiidae
- Genus: Balta
- Species: B. hebardi

Binomial name
- Balta hebardi Princis, 1969

= Balta hebardi =

Species of cockroach

Balta hebardi is a species of cockroach, found in Western Australia. The specific epithet honors the entomologist Morgan Hebard.
