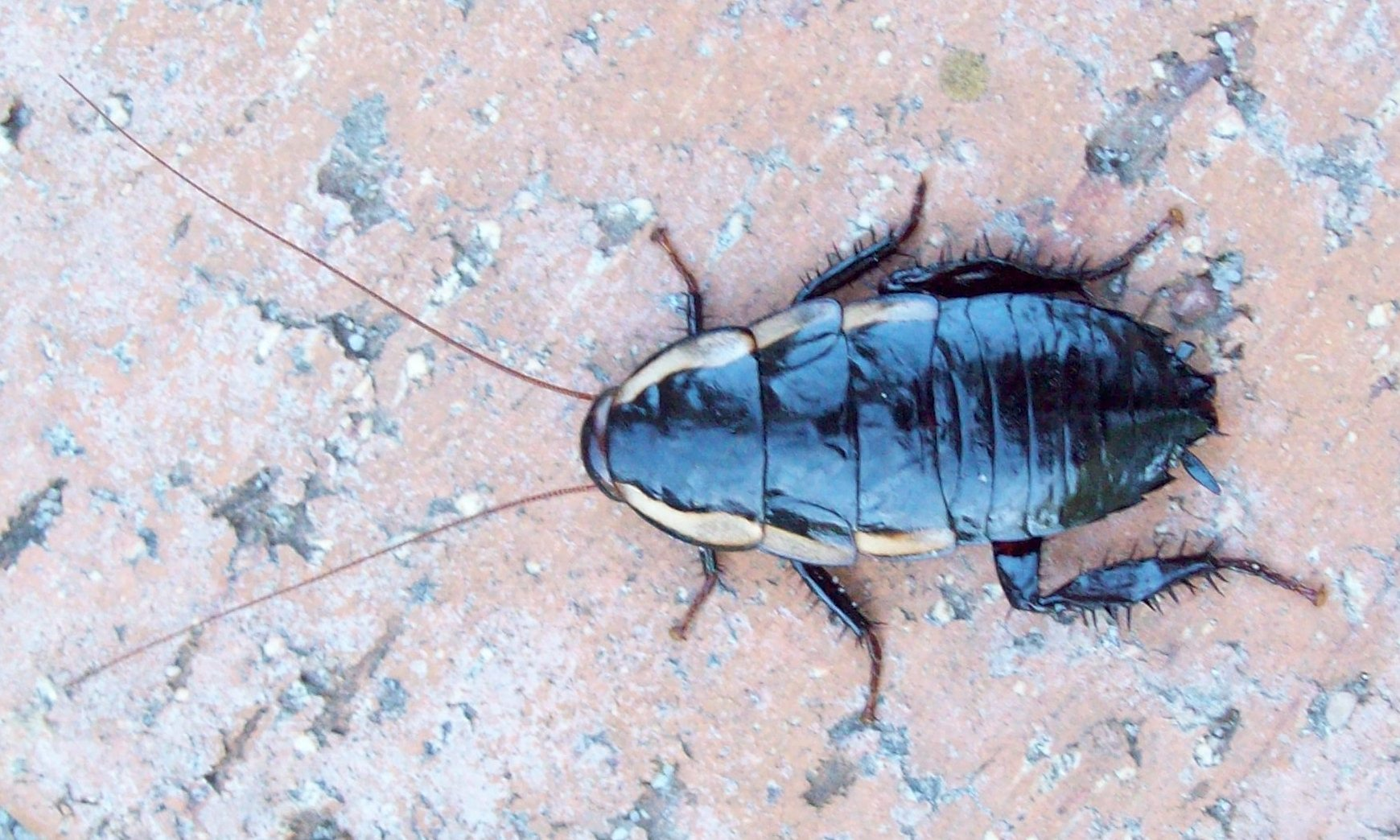
- Drymaplaneta semivitta

Scientific classification
- Kingdom: Animalia
- Phylum: Arthropoda
- Clade: Pancrustacea
- Class: Insecta
- Order: Blattodea
- Family: Blattidae
- Subfamily: Polyzosteriinae
- Genus: Drymaplaneta

Species
- Drymaplaneta communis Drymaplaneta heydeniana Drymaplaneta lobipennis Drymaplaneta semivitta Drymaplaneta shelfordi Drymaplaneta variegata

= Drymaplaneta =

Genus of cockroaches

Drymaplaneta is an Australian genus of cockroaches. It belongs to family Blattidae, subfamily Polyzosteriinae and tribe Methanini.

== Description ==
Drymaplaneta can be distinguished from other Methanini by the greatly reduced, lobiform tegmina, with hind wings absent, and males having maxillary palps with the third and fourth segments swollen.

As for the individual species:

- D. lobipennis and D. shelfordi are uniformly dark.
- D. heydeniana is light yellowish brown, darkening apically, with translucent yellow margins on thorax and abdomen.
- The remaining three species (D. communis, D. semivitta and D. variegata) are very similar to each other. For example, D. semivitta is mostly dark brown/black with white/cream stripes along the sides of the head and thorax.
- The hind tibiae of males are conspicuously expanded and flattened in D. semivitta and D. variegata, but not in any of the other species.
- D. variegata is lighter in colour than D. semivitta, darkening apically. The possibility of synonymy of these two nominal species has been suggested.

== Biodiversity and distribution ==
There are six species of Drymaplaneta, all endemic to Australia. Two of these species, D. heydeniana and D. semivitta, have been introduced to New Zealand.

== Ecology ==
Species of Drymaplaneta mainly occur in outdoor habitats such as under logs, loose bark, ground covers, leaf litter, decks, plant pots, and inside electrical and irrigation boxes. They sometimes enter buildings but are considered harmless to humans. They feed on organic matter, often that which is decaying.
