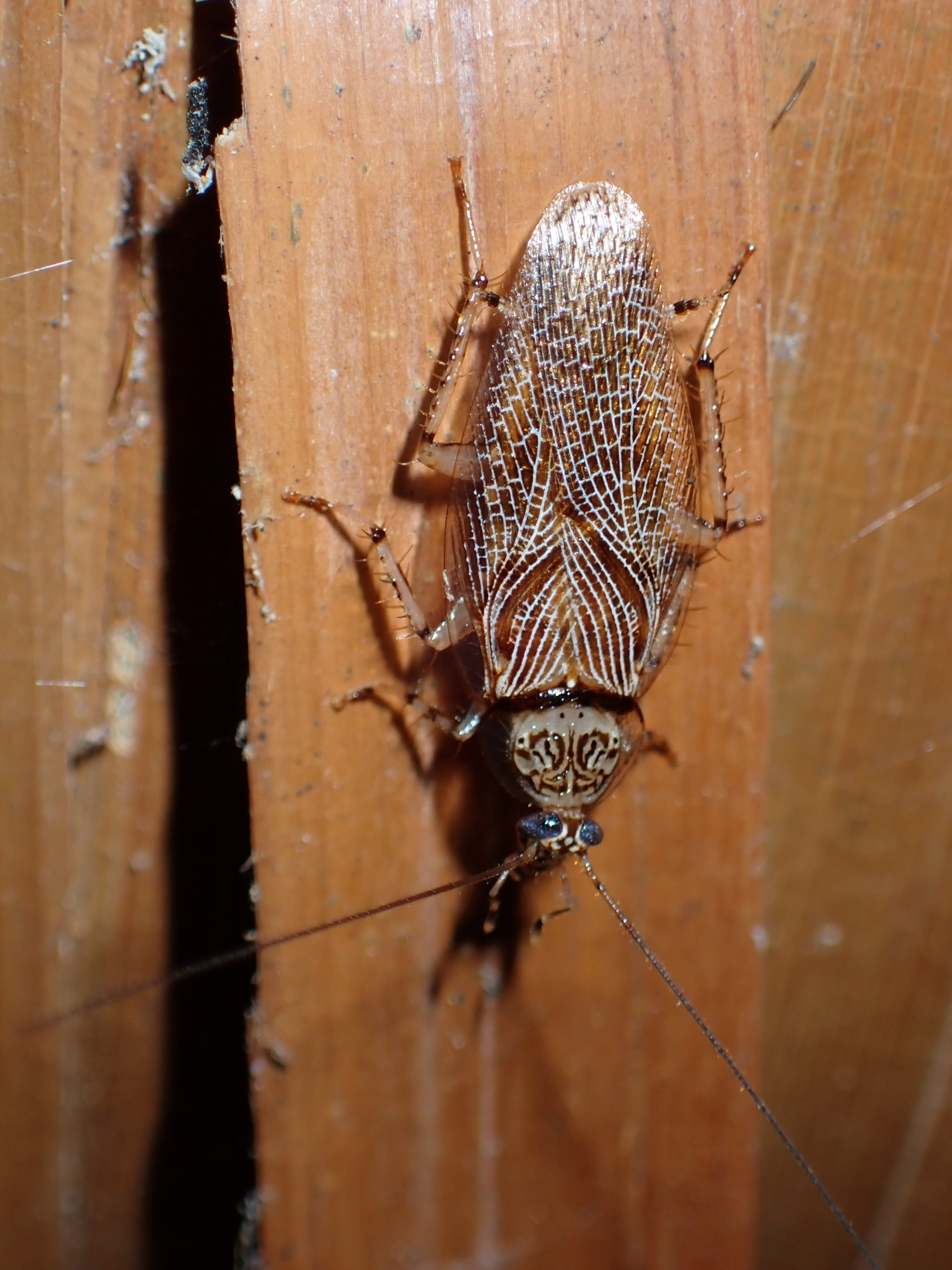

Scientific classification
- Kingdom: Animalia
- Phylum: Arthropoda
- Clade: Pancrustacea
- Class: Insecta
- Order: Blattodea
- Family: Ectobiidae
- Genus: Balta
- Species: B. notulata

Binomial name
- Balta notulata (Stål, 1860)

= Balta notulata =

Species of insect

Balta notulata, also known by the common name small-spotted cockroach, is a species from the genus Balta. By the 1960s it was spread in an area between Sri Lanka, Japan and Easter Island. Already in 1980s it was a domiciliary cockroach in Madang Province.
