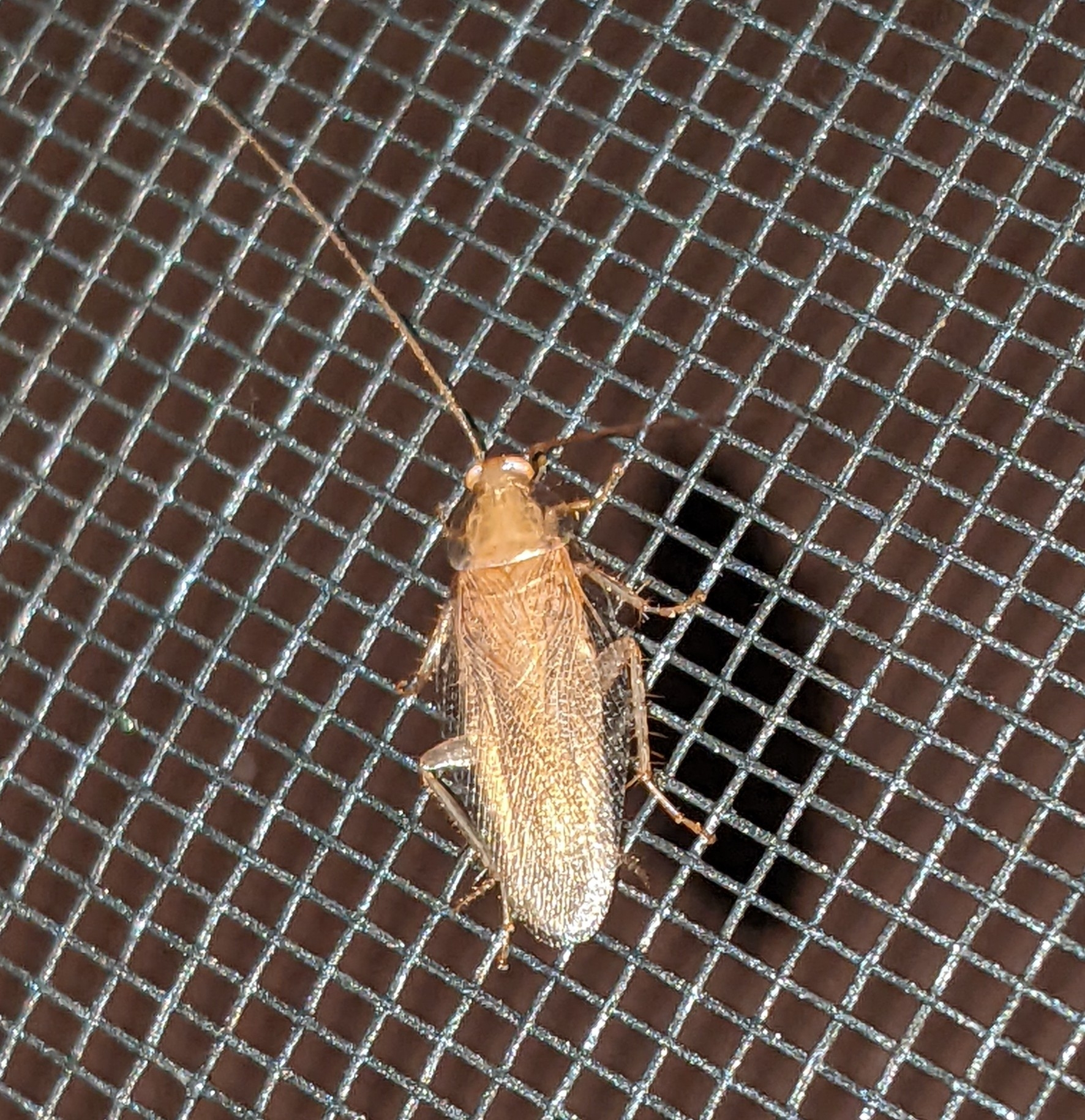

Scientific classification
- Kingdom: Animalia
- Phylum: Arthropoda
- Clade: Pancrustacea
- Class: Insecta
- Order: Blattodea
- Family: Ectobiidae
- Genus: Balta
- Species: B. similis

Binomial name
- Balta similis (Saussure, 1869)

= Balta similis =

Species of insect

Balta similis is a species from the genus Balta.
