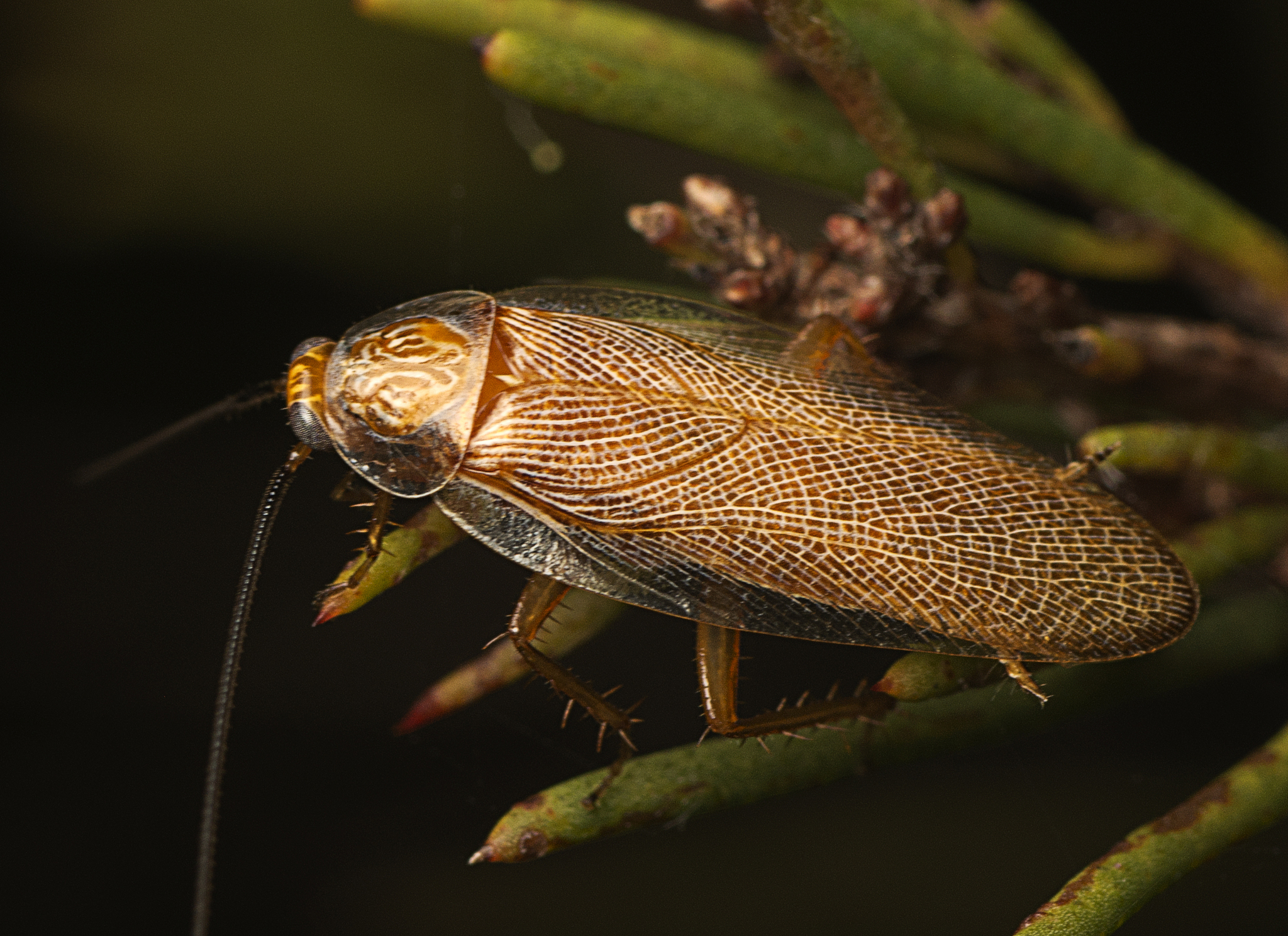

Scientific classification
- Kingdom: Animalia
- Phylum: Arthropoda
- Clade: Pancrustacea
- Class: Insecta
- Order: Blattodea
- Family: Ectobiidae
- Genus: Balta
- Species: B. verticalis

Binomial name
- Balta verticalis Hebard, 1943

= Balta verticalis =

Species of cockroach

Balta verticalis is a species from the genus Balta.
