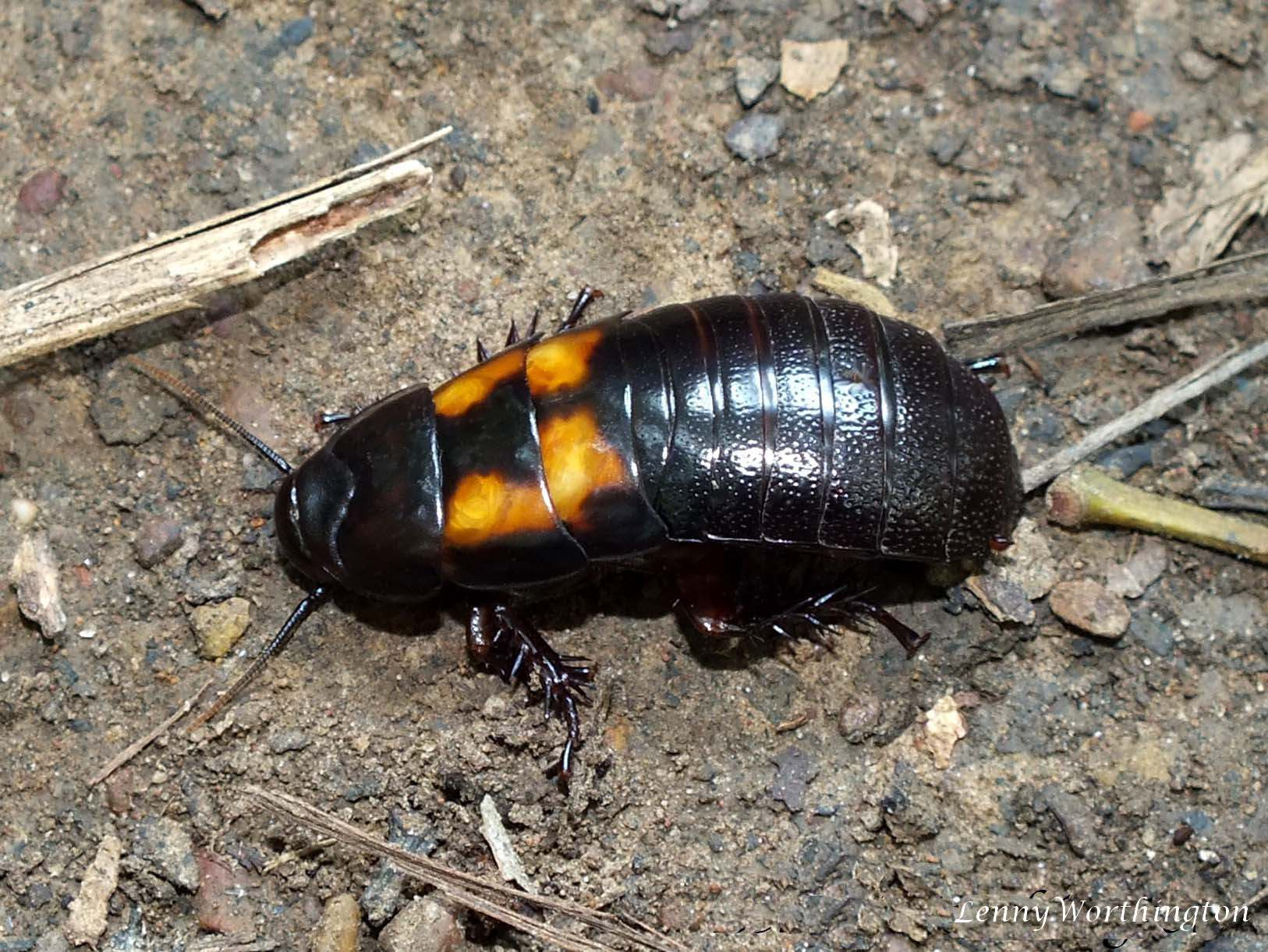
- Panesthia augustipennis

Scientific classification
- Kingdom: Animalia
- Phylum: Arthropoda
- Clade: Pancrustacea
- Class: Insecta
- Order: Blattodea
- Family: Blaberidae
- Subfamily: Panesthiinae
- Genus: Panesthia; Serville, 1831

Synonyms
- Dicellonotus Butler, 1882; Proterodia Costa, 1866

= Panesthia =

Genus of cockroaches

Panesthia is a large genus of burrowing giant cockroaches in the subfamily Panesthiinae. Species of the genus are subsocial and are mainly found in Southeast Asia, coastal East Asia, Australasia, and Indo-Malaysia.

Many species feed on wood, the best-studied being Panesthia angustipennis. Until recently it was believed that Panesthia and other members of Panesthiinae do not rely on the hindgut for wood digestion, but it is now believed that a "fiber-associated microbiome" might be contributing to up to 1/5th of the total xylanase and cellulase activities in the gut of P. angustipennis.

== Species list ==
- Panesthia ancaudellioides Roth & L. M. 1977
- Panesthia angustipennis (Illiger 1801)
- Panesthia antennata Brunner von Wattenwyl 1893
- Panesthia asahinai Roth & L. M. 1979
- Panesthia australis Brunner von Wattenwyl 1865
- Panesthia bilobata Bei-Bienko 1965
- Panesthia birmanica Brunner von Wattenwyl 1893
- Panesthia bougainvillensis Roth & L. M. 1979
- Panesthia celebica Brunner von Wattenwyl 1893
- Panesthia concinna Feng, P. & Woo 1990
- Panesthia cribrata Saussure 1864
- Panesthia cyclopensis Roth & L. M. 1979
- Panesthia flavipennis Wood-Mason 1876
- Panesthia gurneyi Roth & L. M. 1979
- Panesthia heurni Roth & L. M. 1979
- Panesthia karimuiensis Roth & L. M. 1979
- Panesthia larvata Bei-Bienko 1969
- Panesthia lata Walker & F. 1868
- Panesthia lobipennis Brunner von Wattenwyl 1893
- Panesthia lucanoides (Butler 1882)
- Panesthia luteoalata Hanitsch 1937
- Panesthia matthewsi Roth & L. M. 1977
- Panesthia mearnsi Caudell 1924
- Panesthia missimensis Roth & L. M. 1979
- Panesthia modiglianii Hanitsch 1932
- Panesthia monstruosa Wood-Mason 1876
- Panesthia morosa Kirby & W. F. 1903
- Panesthia morsus (Butler 1882)
- Panesthia necrophoroides Walker & F. 1868
- Panesthia obscura (Saussure 1873)
- Panesthia obtusa Shaw 1918
- Panesthia ornata Saussure 1873
- Panesthia papuensis Roth & L. M. 1979
- Panesthia paramonstruosa Roth & L. M. 1979
- Panesthia parva Shaw 1918
- Panesthia plagiata Walker & F. 1859
- Panesthia puncticollis Stål 1877
- Panesthia pygmaea Princis 1951
- Panesthia quadriporosa Roth & L. M. 1979
- Panesthia quinquedentata Kirby & W. F. 1903
- Panesthia regalis Walker & F. 1868
- Panesthia rufipennis Princis 1957
- Panesthia saussurei Stål 1877
- Panesthia sedlaceki Roth & L. M. 1979
- Panesthia serrata Saussure 1895
- Panesthia shelfordi Hanitsch 1923
- Panesthia sinuata Saussure 1895
- Panesthia sloanei Shaw 1918
- Panesthia stellata Saussure 1895
- Panesthia strelkovi Bei-Bienko 1969
- Panesthia tepperi Kirby & W. F. 1903
- Panesthia toxopeusi Roth & L. M. 1979
- Panesthia transversa Burmeister 1838
- Panesthia triangulifera Hanitsch 1927
- Panesthia tryoni Shaw 1918
- Panesthia urbani Roth & L. M. 1979
- Panesthia wallacei Wood-Mason 1876
