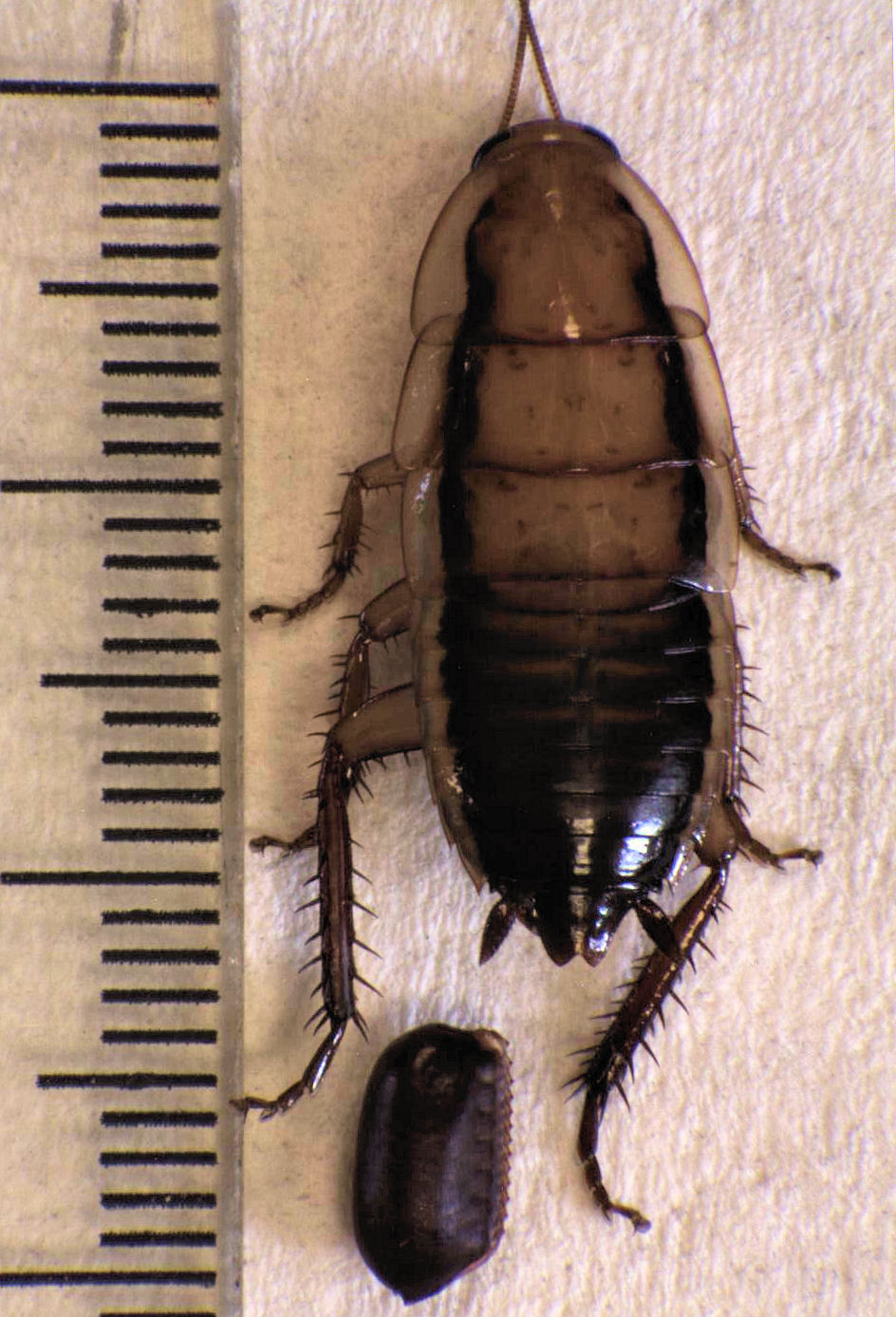
- Drymaplaneta heydeniana (female with ootheca)

Scientific classification
- Kingdom: Animalia
- Phylum: Arthropoda
- Clade: Pancrustacea
- Class: Insecta
- Order: Blattodea
- Family: Blattidae
- Genus: Drymaplaneta
- Species: D. heydeniana

Binomial name
- Drymaplaneta heydeniana (de Saussure, 1864)

= Drymaplaneta heydeniana =

Species of cockroach

Drymaplaneta heydeniana is a species of cockroach.

== Distribution ==
Drymaplaneta heydeniana is endemic to Western Australia, and adventive in New Zealand.
