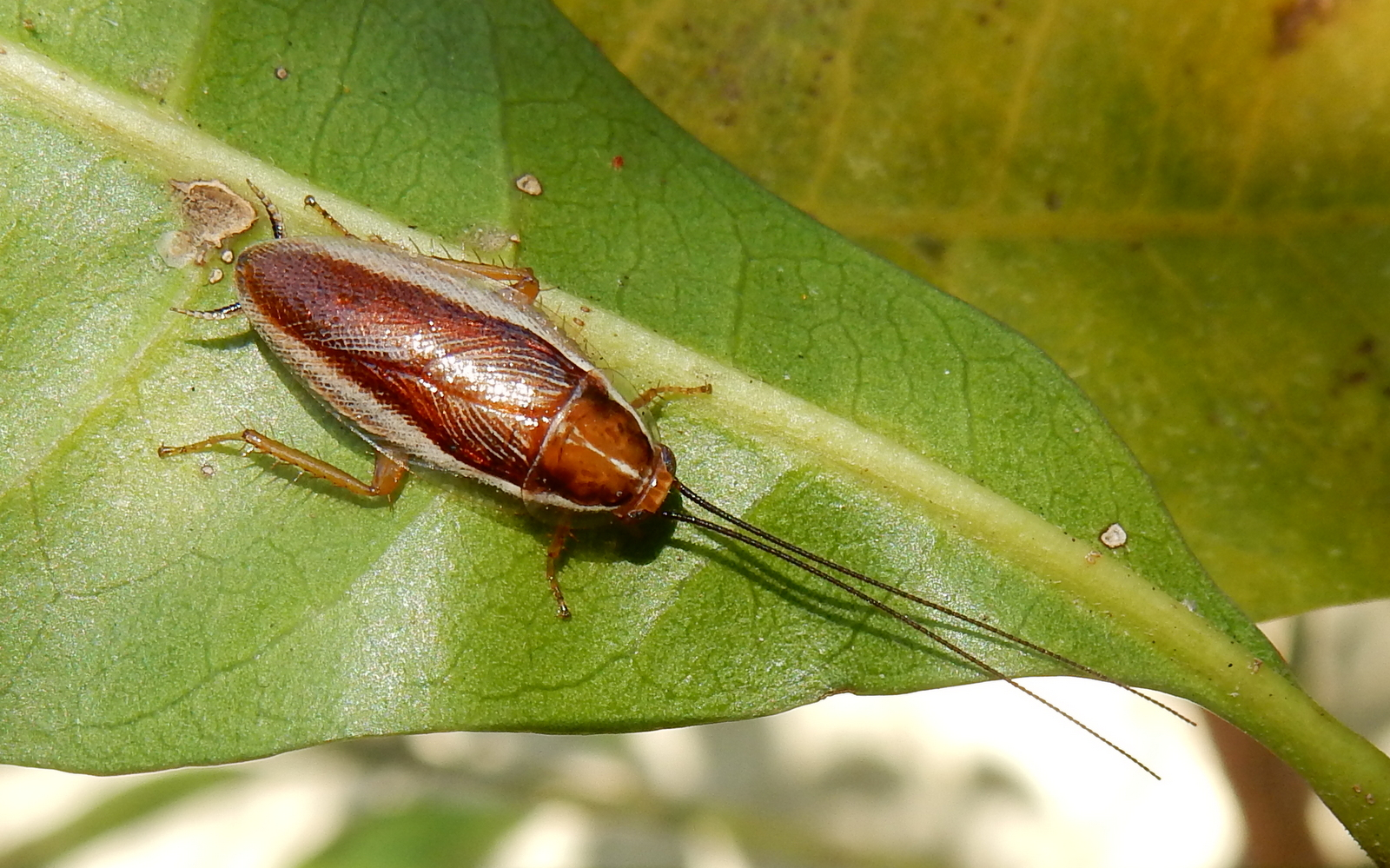

Scientific classification
- Kingdom: Animalia
- Phylum: Arthropoda
- Clade: Pancrustacea
- Class: Insecta
- Order: Blattodea
- Family: Ectobiidae
- Genus: Balta
- Species: B. spuria

Binomial name
- Balta spuria Brunner, 1865

= Balta spuria =

Species of cockroach

Balta spuria is a species of cockroach, indigenous to Australia.
