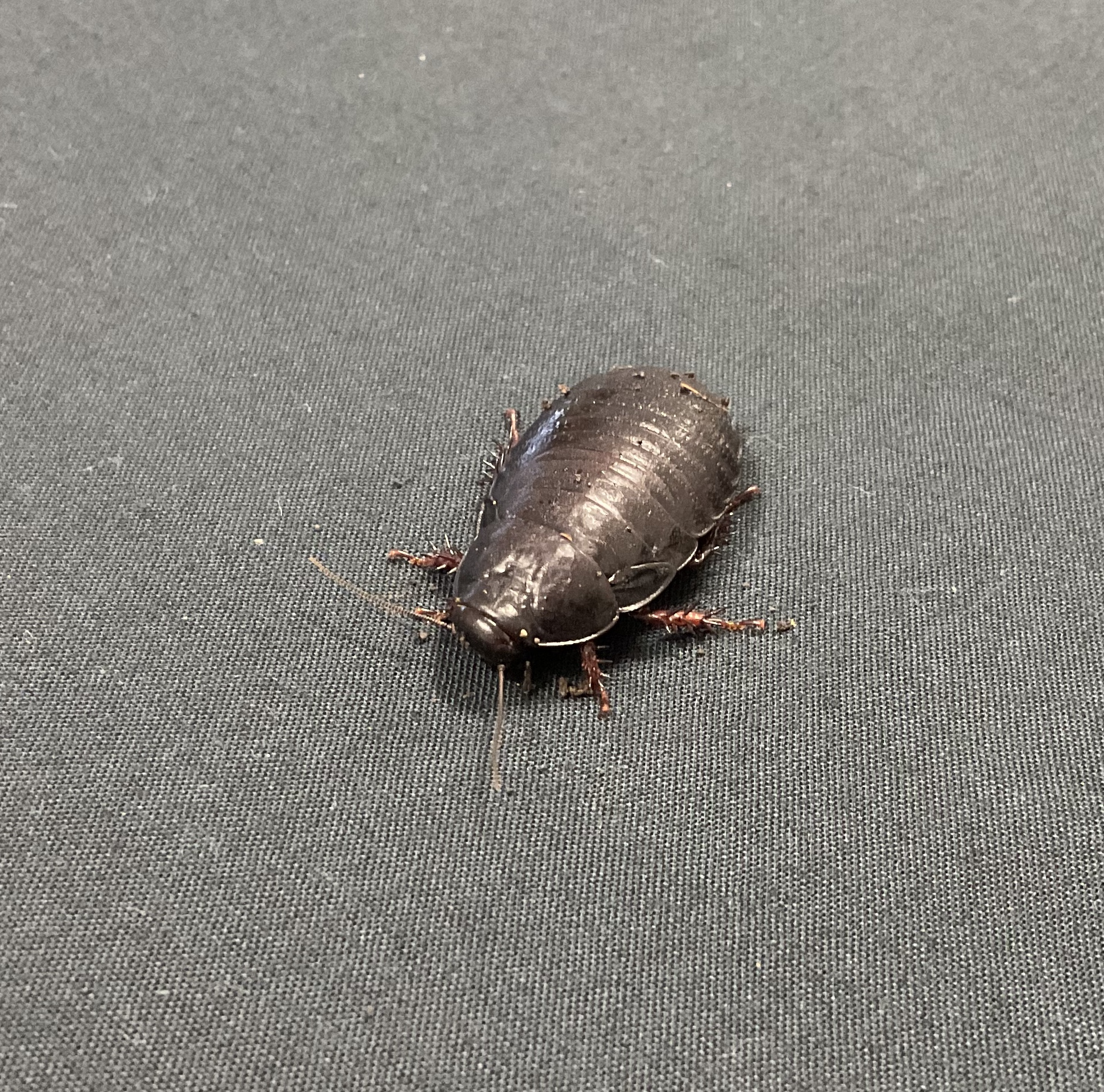
- Female Lord Howe Island cockroach (Panesthia lata) from Blackburn Island

Scientific classification
- Kingdom: Animalia
- Phylum: Arthropoda
- Clade: Pancrustacea
- Class: Insecta
- Order: Blattodea
- Family: Blaberidae
- Genus: Panesthia
- Species: P. lata

Binomial name
- Panesthia lata Walker, 1868

= Panesthia lata =

Species of cockroach

Panesthia lata, the Lord Howe Island wood-feeding cockroach or Lord Howe Island cockroach, is a large, wingless cockroach species endemic to the Lord Howe Island Group in the Tasman Sea.

== Appearance and diet ==
Panesthia lata is reasonably large, growing between 22–40 millimetres (0.87–1.57 in). It is metallic in colour, with general black to reddish colouration. It can be distinguished from other related species by its abdominal morphology and the shape of its cerci.

The species feeds on rotting wood and leaf litter, and has micro-organisms in its digestive system to help break down cellulose. It stays in the ground during the day and feeds at night.

== Population ==
While once widespread across the archipelago, it was removed from Lord Howe Island proper by rats introduced in 1918, and none had been found for over 80 years. Today, the largest known populations occur on nearby islets, including Blackburn Island, Roach Island and Ball's Pyramid. The species is classified as "Endangered" under the New South Wales Threatened Species Act, and a plan exists to eventually reintroduce a population to Lord Howe Island.

== Taxonomy ==
Panesthia lata was first described in 1868 by Francis Walker in his "Catalogue of the specimens of Blattariæ in the collection of the British Museum". It is in the subfamily Panestheiinae, which is distributed across Southeastern Asia and Oceania.

== Rediscovery on Lord Howe island ==
After not having been observed on Lord Howe Island for over 80 years, a biology student at the University of Sydney rediscovered them on the island in late 2022.
