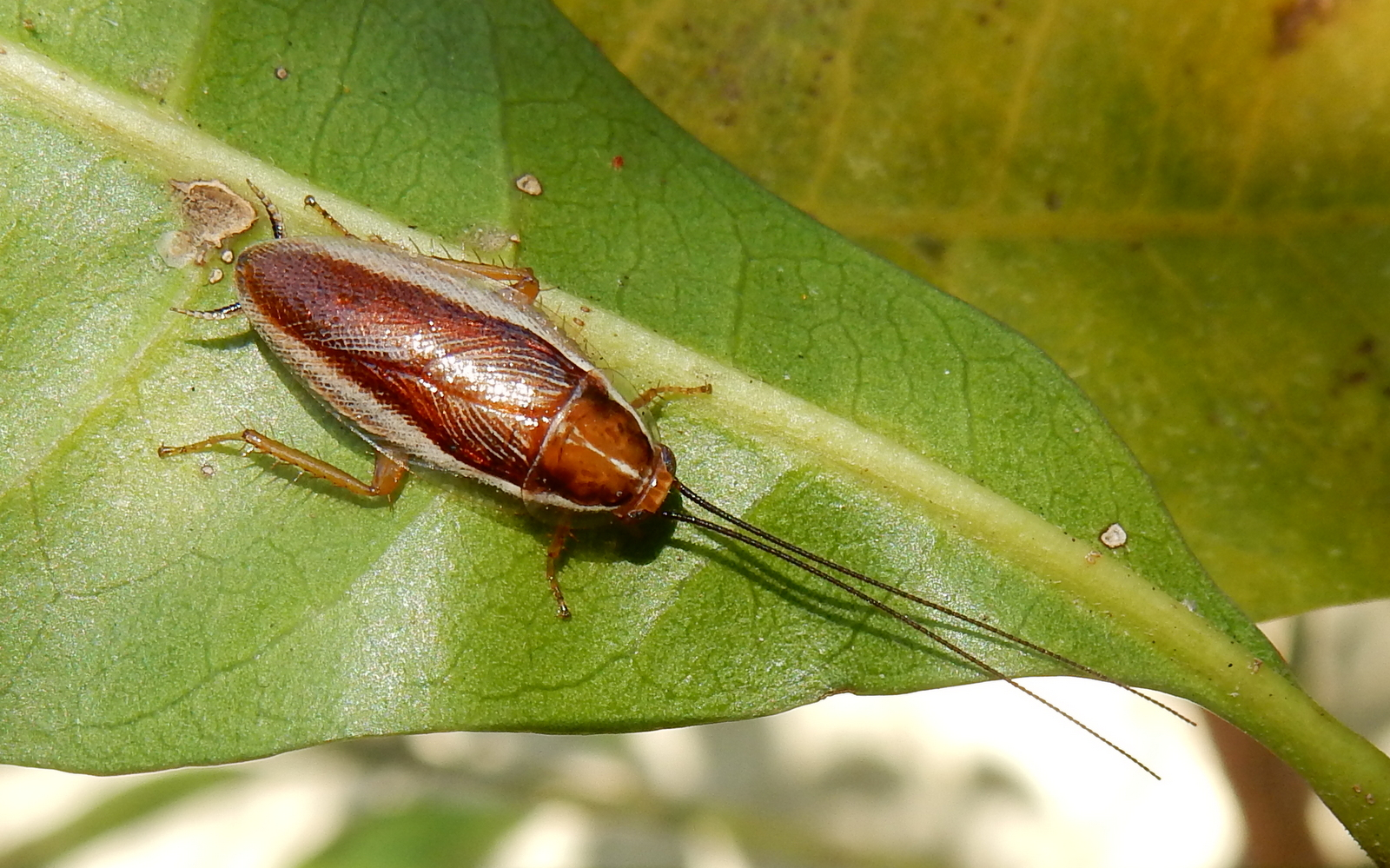
- Balta spuria

Scientific classification
- Kingdom: Animalia
- Phylum: Arthropoda
- Clade: Pancrustacea
- Class: Insecta
- Order: Blattodea
- Family: Ectobiidae
- Subfamily: Pseudophyllodromiinae
- Genus: Balta; Tepper 1893

= Balta (cockroach) =

Genus of cockroaches

Balta is a genus of cockroaches in the subfamily Pseudophyllodromiinae. Found in Asia, Africa, Australia and Oceania. The genus was created in 1893 by Johann Tepper.

== Species ==
These species belong to the genus Balta:

- Balta acutiventris (Chopard, 1924)
- Balta amplior (Hebard, 1943)
- Balta arborescens (Hanitsch, 1930)
- Balta athertonae (Hebard, 1943)
- Balta aurea (Hanitsch, 1928)
- Balta barbellata (Che & Chen, 2010)
- Balta bicolor (Hebard, 1943)
- Balta bilobata (Hanitsch, 1928)
- Balta brunnea (Chopard, 1924)
- Balta caledonica (Chopard, 1924)
- Balta camerunensis (Shelford, 1908)
- Balta chopardi (Princis, 1969)
- Balta similis (Chopard, 1924)
- Balta crassivenosa (Bolívar, 1924)
- Balta curvidens (Hebard, 1943)
- Balta curvirostris Che & Chen, 2010
- Balta denticauda Hebard, 1943
- Balta dissecta Che & Wang, 2010
- Balta epilamproides Tepper, 1893
- Balta fragilis Hebard, 1943
- Balta francquii Princis, 1969
- Balta fratercula Hebard, 1943
- Balta gemmicula Hebard, 1943
- Balta globifera (Hanitsch, 1933)
- Balta godeffroyi (Shelford, 1911)
- Balta gracilipes (Chopard, 1924)
- Balta grandis (Chopard, 1924)
- Balta granulosa (Hanitsch, 1933)
- Balta hebardi Princis, 1969
- Balta heterostylata Princis, 1957
- Balta hwangorum Bey-Bienko, 1958
- Balta ikonnikovi (Bey-Bienko, 1941)
- Balta inermis (Princis, 1963)
- Balta innotabilis (Walker, 1871)
- Balta conspicienda (Bolívar, 1895)
- Balta insignis (Shelford, 1910)
- Balta jacobsoni (Hebard, 1929)
- Balta jinlinorum Che & Wang, 2010
- Balta komodensis Bey-Bienko, 1965
- Balta kurandae Hebard, 1943
- Balta litura (Tepper, 1896)
- Balta livida (Princis, 1963)
- Balta longealata (Hanitsch, 1930)
- Balta longicercata (Bolívar, 1924)
- Balta luteicosta Hebard, 1943
- Balta luzonica (Bey-Bienko, 1941)
- Balta minuta (Chopard, 1924)
- Balta montaguei (Chopard, 1924)
- Balta mundicola (Walker, 1868)
- Balta nebulosa (Hebard, 1943)
- Balta nigrolineata (Stål, 1877)
- Balta notulata (Stål, 1860)
- Balta pallidula (Hebard, 1943)
- Balta papua (Saussure & Zehntner, 1895)
- Balta parvula (Bolívar, 1924)
- Balta patula (Walker, 1869)
- Balta perpallida Hebard, 1943
- Balta perscripta Hebard, 1943
- Balta personata Hebard, 1943
- Balta picea Bey-Bienko, 1958
- Balta praestans Hebard, 1943
- Balta pulchella Hebard, 1943
- Balta punctuligera Hebard, 1943
- Balta quadricaudata Hebard, 1943
- Balta ramifera (Walker, 1871)
- Balta reticulata (Fabricius, 1798)
- Balta rouxi (Chopard, 1924)
- Balta ruficeps (Kirby, 1900)
- Balta sarasini (Chopard, 1924)
- Balta scripta (Shelford, 1911)
- Balta serraticauda Hebard, 1943
- Balta setifera (Hanitsch, 1929)
- Balta siccifolia (Hanitsch, 1932)
- Balta signata Bey-Bienko, 1965
- Balta similis (Saussure, 1869)
- Balta spinea Che & Chen, 2010
- Balta spinescens Che & Wang, 2010
- Balta spuria (Wattenwyl, 1865)
- Balta stylata Hebard, 1943
- Balta testacea (Tepper, 1896)
- Balta toowoomba Hebard, 1943
- Balta torresiana Hebard, 1943
- Balta translucida (Shelford, 1908)
- Balta transversa Hebard, 1943
- Balta tricolor (Hanitsch, 1934)
- Balta unicolor (Chopard, 1929)
- Balta uvarovi (Chopard, 1924)
- Balta variegata (Hanitsch, 1933)
- Balta ventralis Hebard, 1943
- Balta verticalis Hebard, 1943
- Balta vicina (Wattenwyl), 1893)
- Balta vilis (Wattenwyl), 1865)
- Balta yorkensis Hebard, 1943
