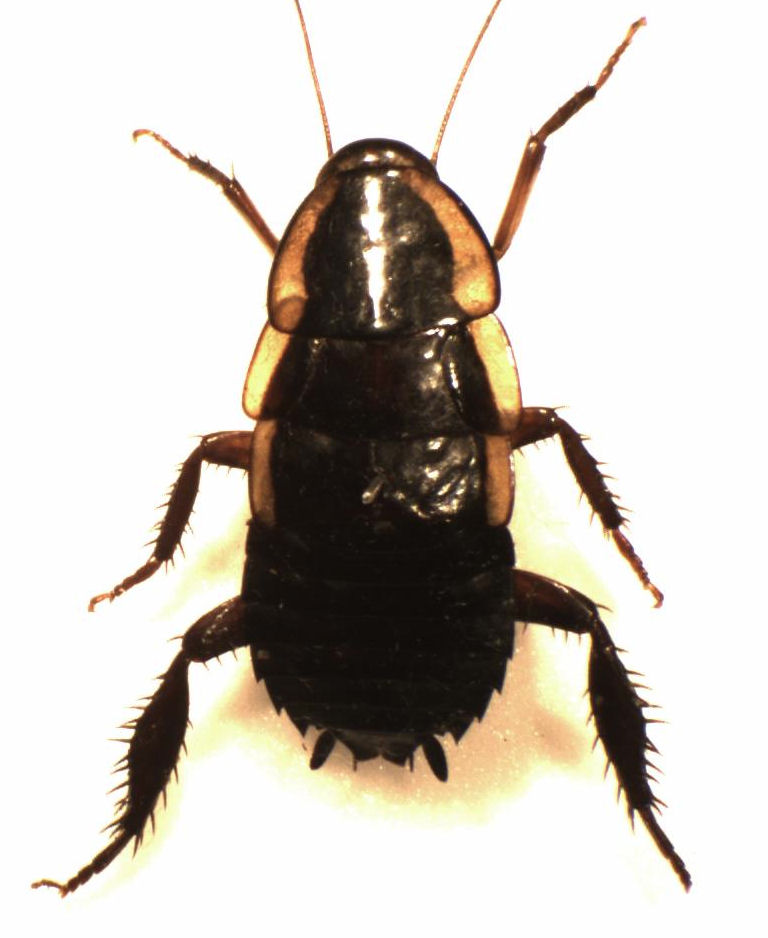

Scientific classification
- Kingdom: Animalia
- Phylum: Arthropoda
- Clade: Pancrustacea
- Class: Insecta
- Order: Blattodea
- Family: Blattidae
- Genus: Drymaplaneta
- Species: D. semivitta

Binomial name
- Drymaplaneta semivitta Walker, 1868

= Drymaplaneta semivitta =

Species of cockroach

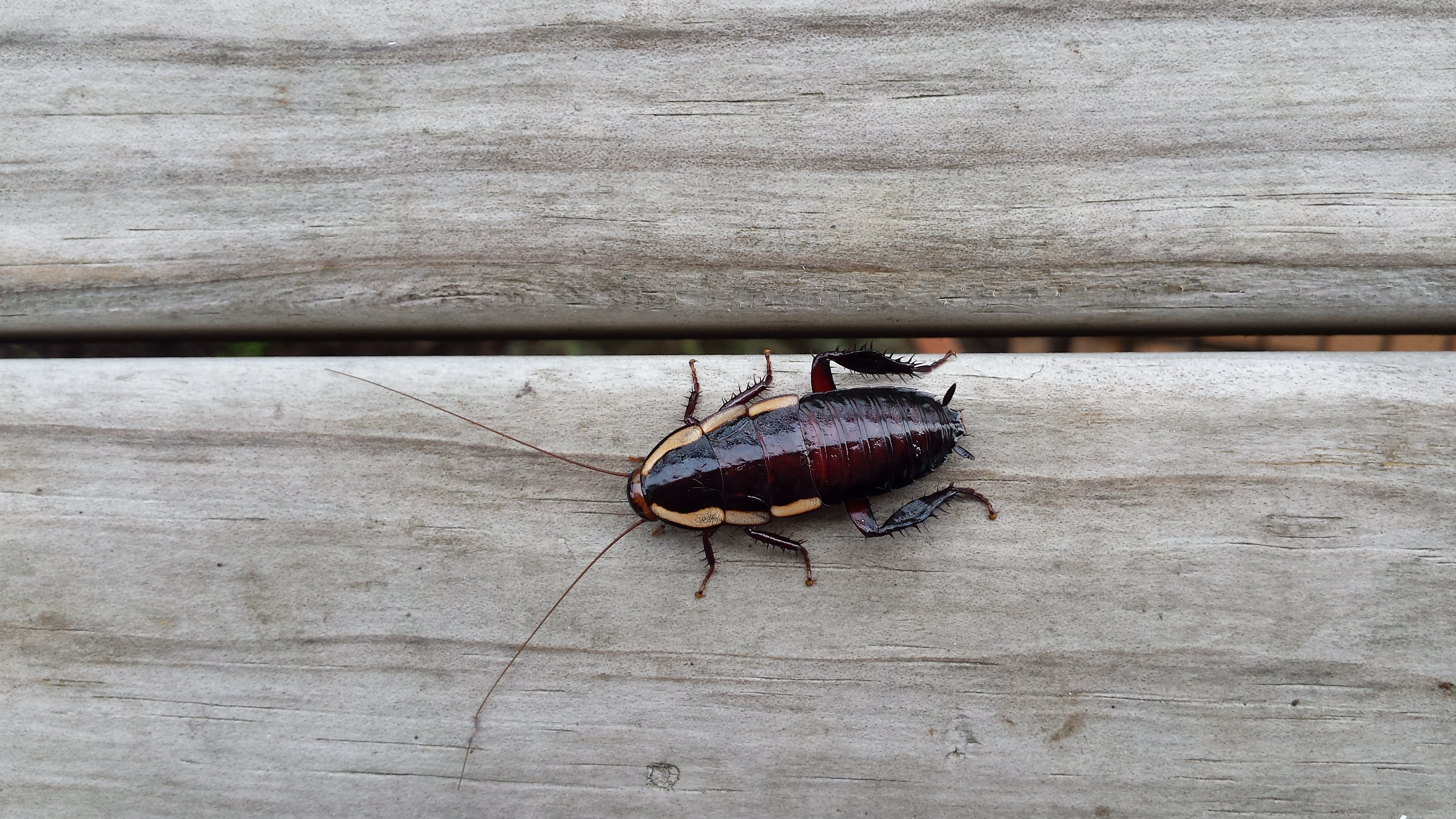
A Gisborne cockroach in Auckland

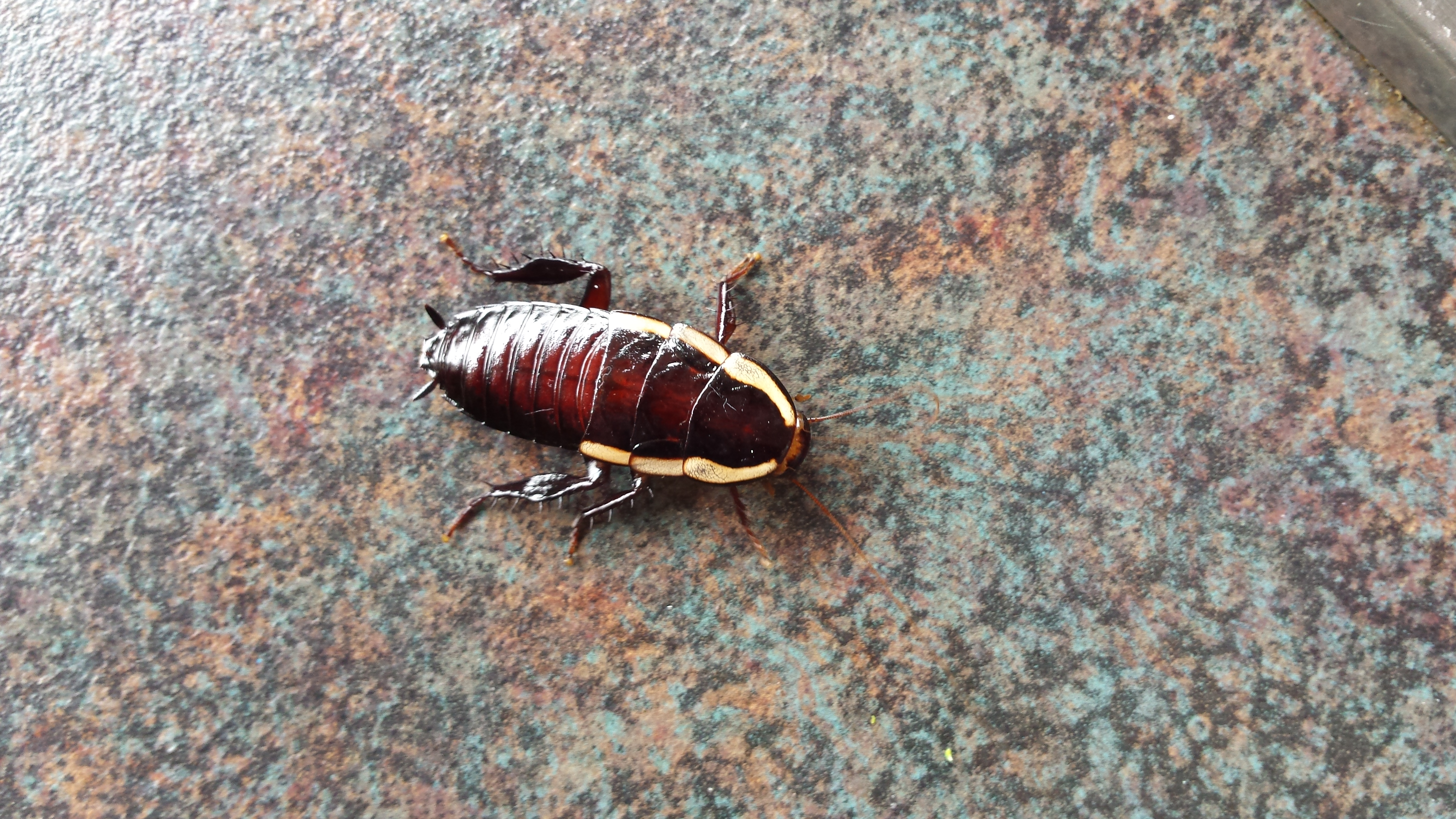
The same individual as above

Drymaplaneta semivitta is a species of cockroach native to Australia and introduced to New Zealand. In New Zealand, it is known as the Gisborne cockroach, after the city of Gisborne where it was first discovered in the country. It has also been claimed to have first appeared in Tauranga in 1954, probably arriving on a log shipment.

== Distinctive features ==
One of the larger cockroaches, Drymaplaneta semivitta is about 20–45mm long and 12–15mm wide. It is a glossy dark brown, with distinctive tan or white coloured translucent stripes along each side of its head. Unlike many cockroaches, it has no vestigial wings.

In males, the third and fourth maxillary palps are enlarged, and the hind tibiae are flattened and expanded.

== Habitat and diet ==
Drymaplaneta semivitta is often found in wood material, such as timber or bark chips. It feeds off organic material but does not normally infest food. In cold weather, it can be found in roof cavities and the empty spaces between walls. D. semivitta is generally regarded as harmless.

== Biology ==
Hex-2-enal is present in the defensive secretions of D. semivitta. This chemical also occurs in some other species of Drymaplaneta.

== Range ==
Drymaplaneta semivitta is most often found in Melbourne, Sydney, and throughout the North Island of New Zealand, and also in Nelson and Blenheim, although it has been found as far south as Timaru, Dunedin and Invercargill.
