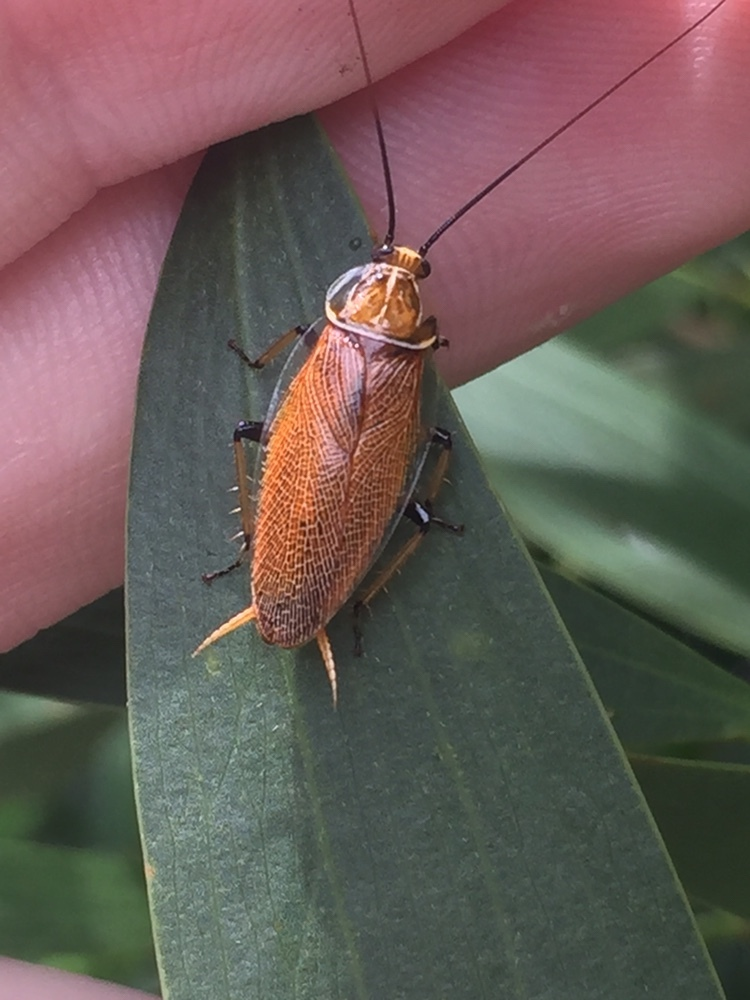
- A Balta bicolor specimen in Auckland, New Zealand

Scientific classification
- Kingdom: Animalia
- Phylum: Arthropoda
- Clade: Pancrustacea
- Class: Insecta
- Order: Blattodea
- Family: Ectobiidae
- Genus: Balta
- Species: B. bicolor

Binomial name
- Balta bicolor Hebard, 1943

= Balta bicolor =

Species of insect

Balta bicolor is a type of cockroach from the genus Balta. Native to eastern Australia, the species has been identified in New Zealand since 2009.

== Description ==
Balta bicolor has a relatively pale face, occiput and interocular area, with dark antennae. It is visually similar to Ellipsidion cockroaches, and can be distinguished from Balta transversa by its deeper head proportions.

== Distribution and habitat ==
The species is native to eastern Australia. In 2009, Biosecurity New Zealand first identified the species in New Zealand (as Balta bicolour), after being found in an Auckland kitchen.

Balta bicolor is typically found in plant litter or under bark.

== Gallery ==
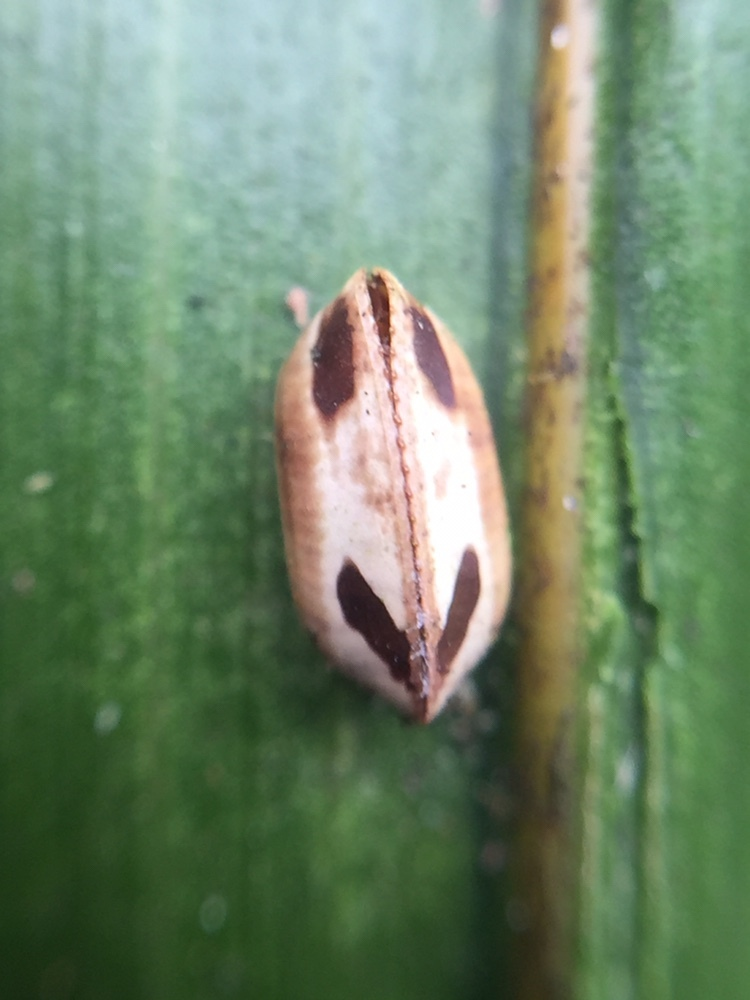
Balta bicolor ootheca (egg capsule)

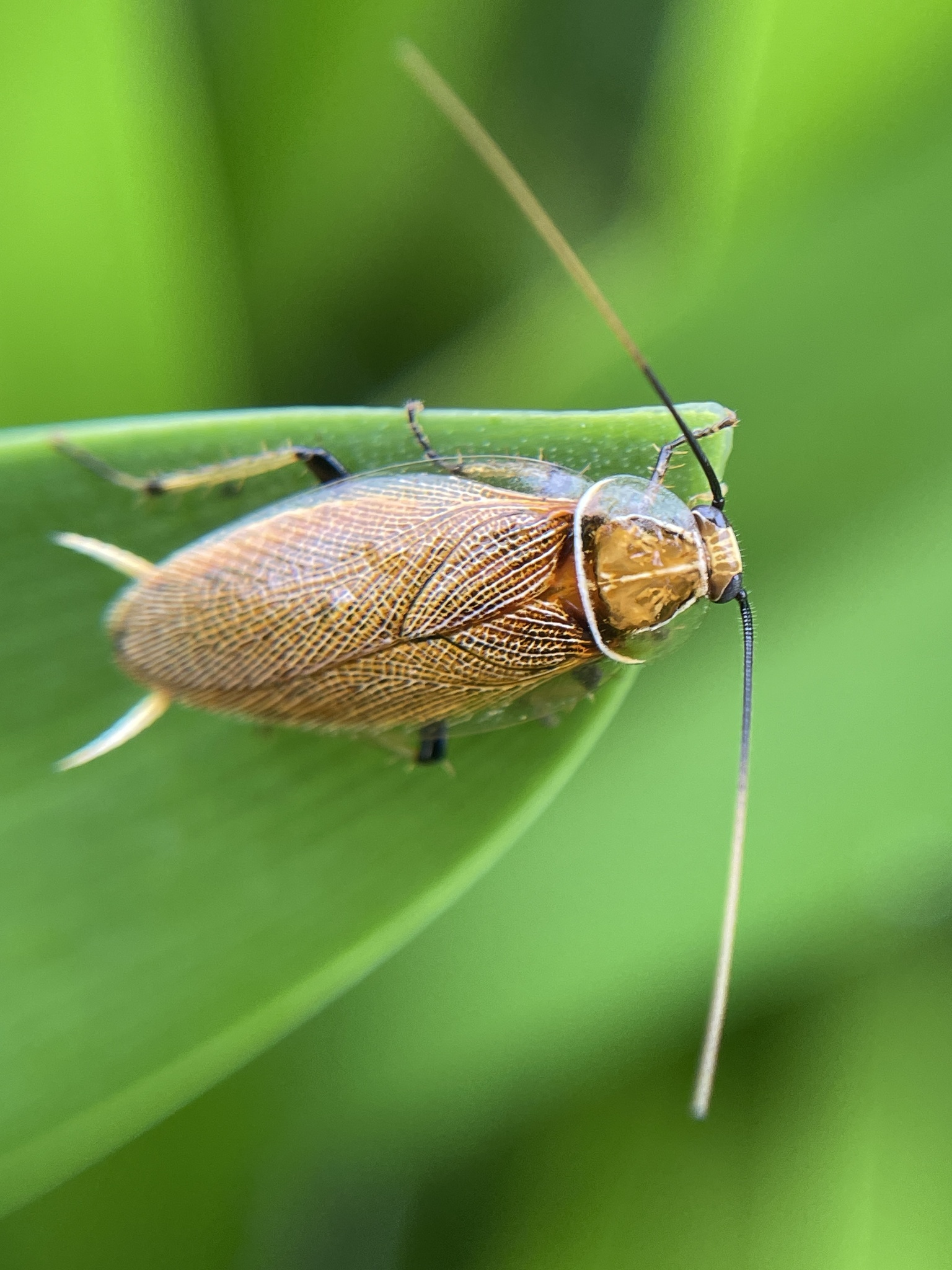
A Balta bicolor specimen in Victoria, Australia

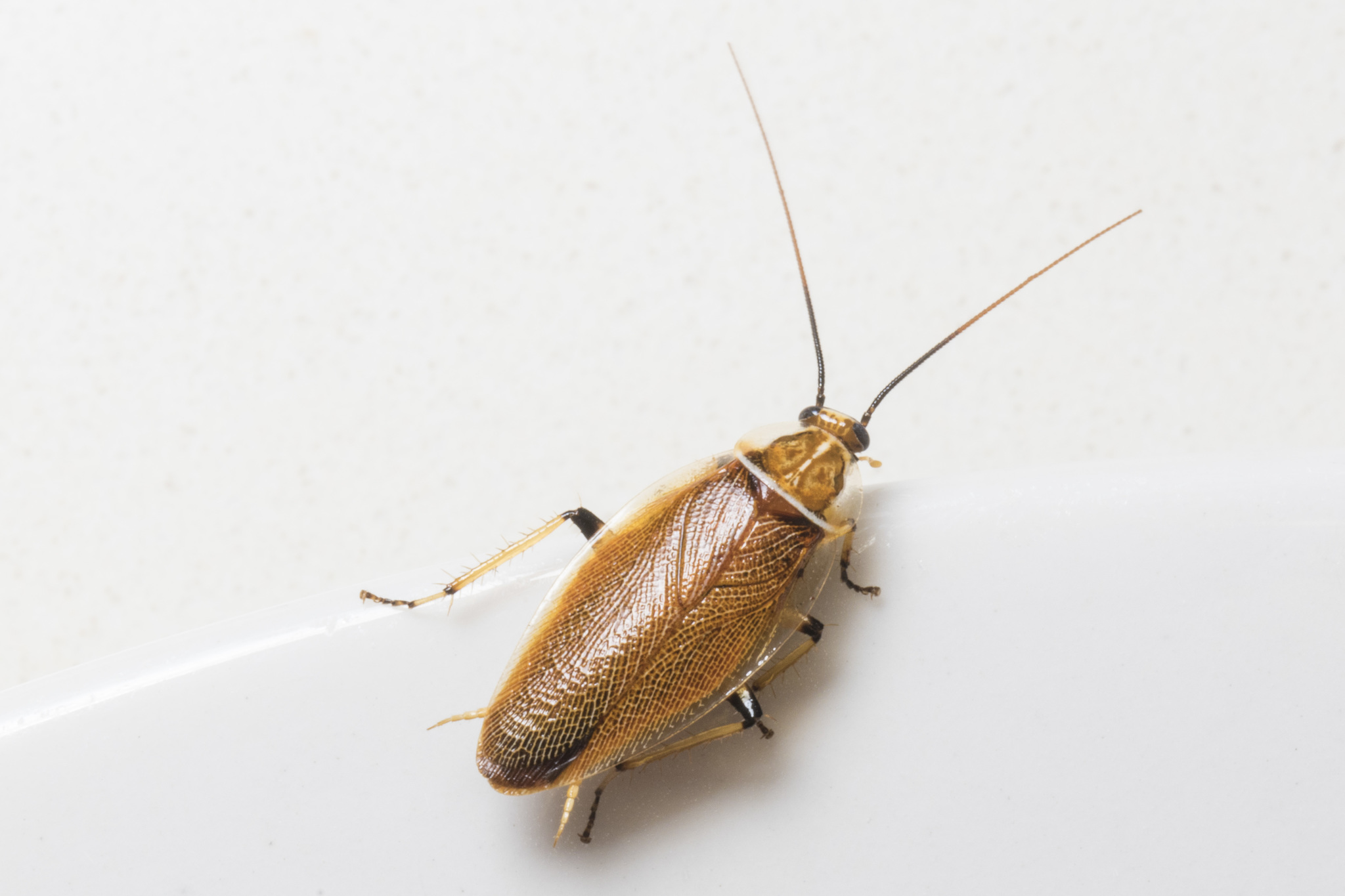
A Balta bicolor specimen in Auckland, New Zealand
