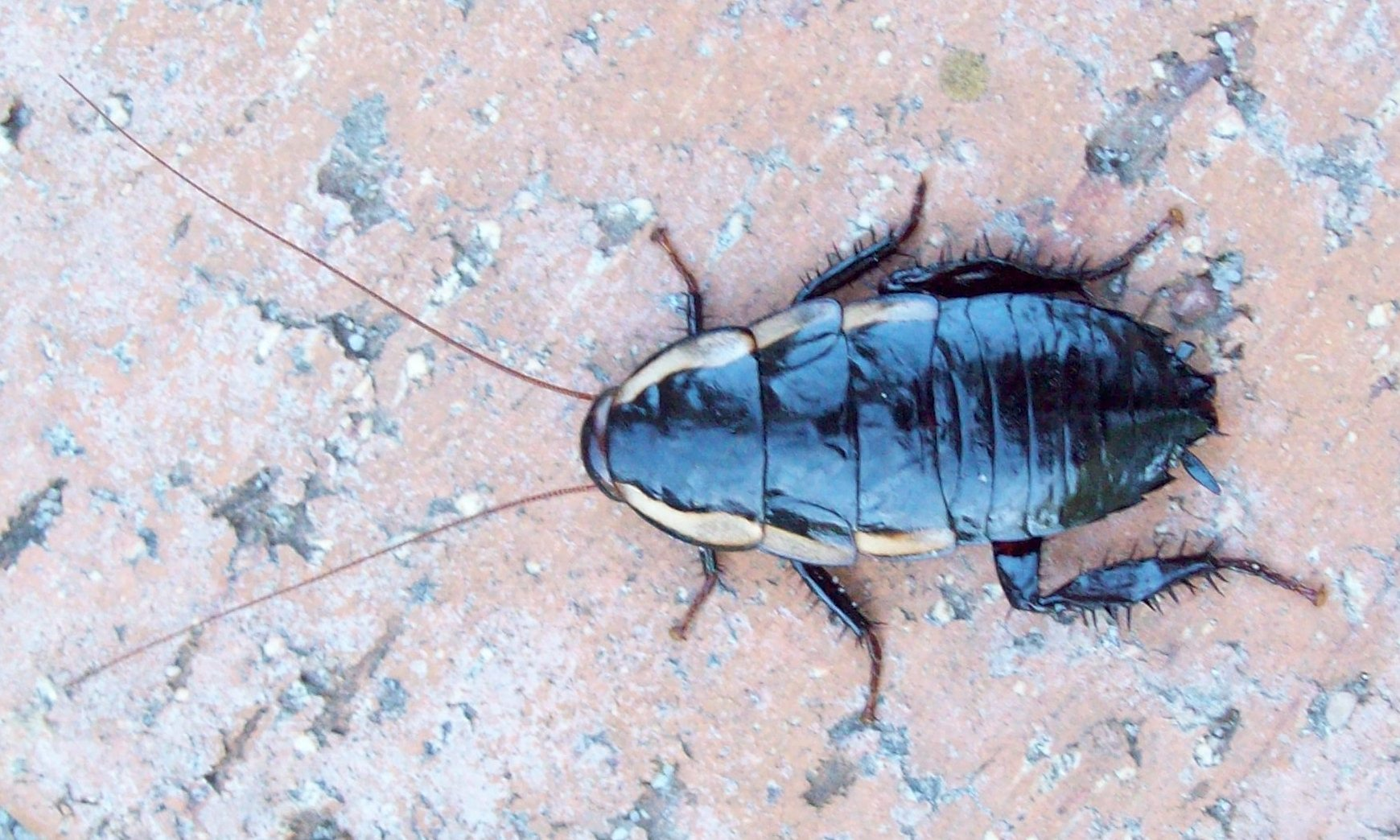

Scientific classification
- Kingdom: Animalia
- Phylum: Arthropoda
- Clade: Pancrustacea
- Class: Insecta
- Order: Blattodea
- Family: Blattidae
- Genus: Drymaplaneta
- Species: D. communis

Binomial name
- Drymaplaneta communis Tepper, 1893

= Common shining cockroach =

Species of cockroach

The common shining cockroach (Drymaplaneta communis) is a cockroach native to south-east Australia. It feeds on organic matter and is often found under the bark of eucalypt trees. During the late 1990s and 2000s, this cockroach appears to have had a population explosion in Sydney and Melbourne and is commonly found inside houses. This population increase likely coincides with an extended dry period, where many suburban gardeners added mulch to their gardens which provided a habitat for the common shining cockroach. Despite commonly being found inside houses, the common shining cockroach does not pose the same health risk as introduced cockroaches.
