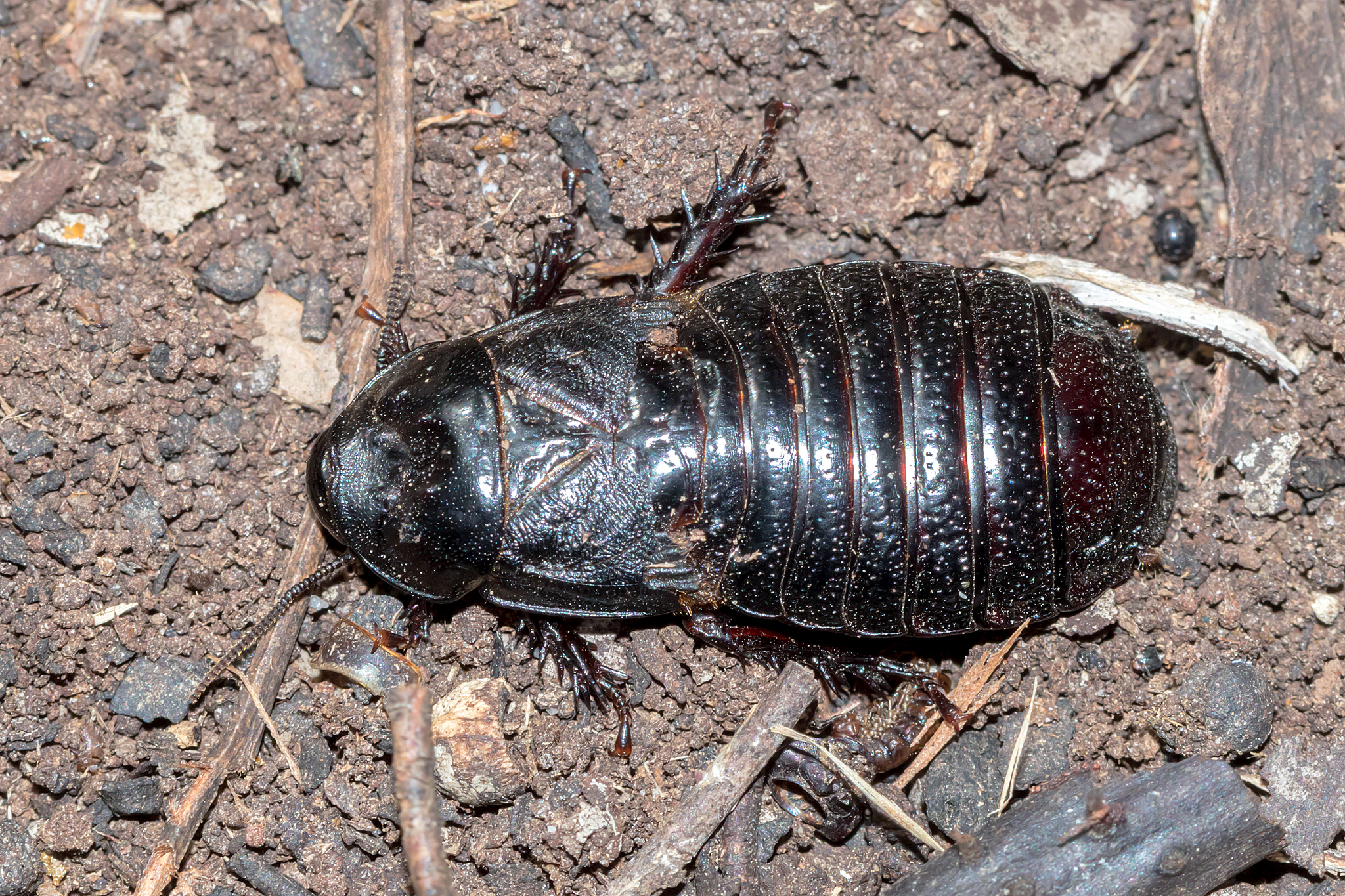

Scientific classification
- Kingdom: Animalia
- Phylum: Arthropoda
- Clade: Pancrustacea
- Class: Insecta
- Order: Blattodea
- Family: Blaberidae
- Genus: Panesthia
- Species: P. australis

Binomial name
- Panesthia australis von Wattenwyl, 1865

Synonyms
- Panesthia perfecta Kirby, 1903

= Panesthia australis =

Species of insect

Panesthia australis, colloquially called the Australian wood cockroach or the common wood cockroach, is a species of giant cockroach endemic to Australia.

== Appearance ==
Adults of this species are usually around 3.4 cm long and black, while nymphs vary between 7 and 35 mm in length, the average length being roughly 17 mm. Sexual dimorphism in the species is negligible.

== Distribution ==
Panesesthia australis is mostly found in Eastern Australia, especially in New South Wales.

== Colonies ==
Panesthia australis lives in family groups in rotting wood. The walls of their burrows are made of frass.
