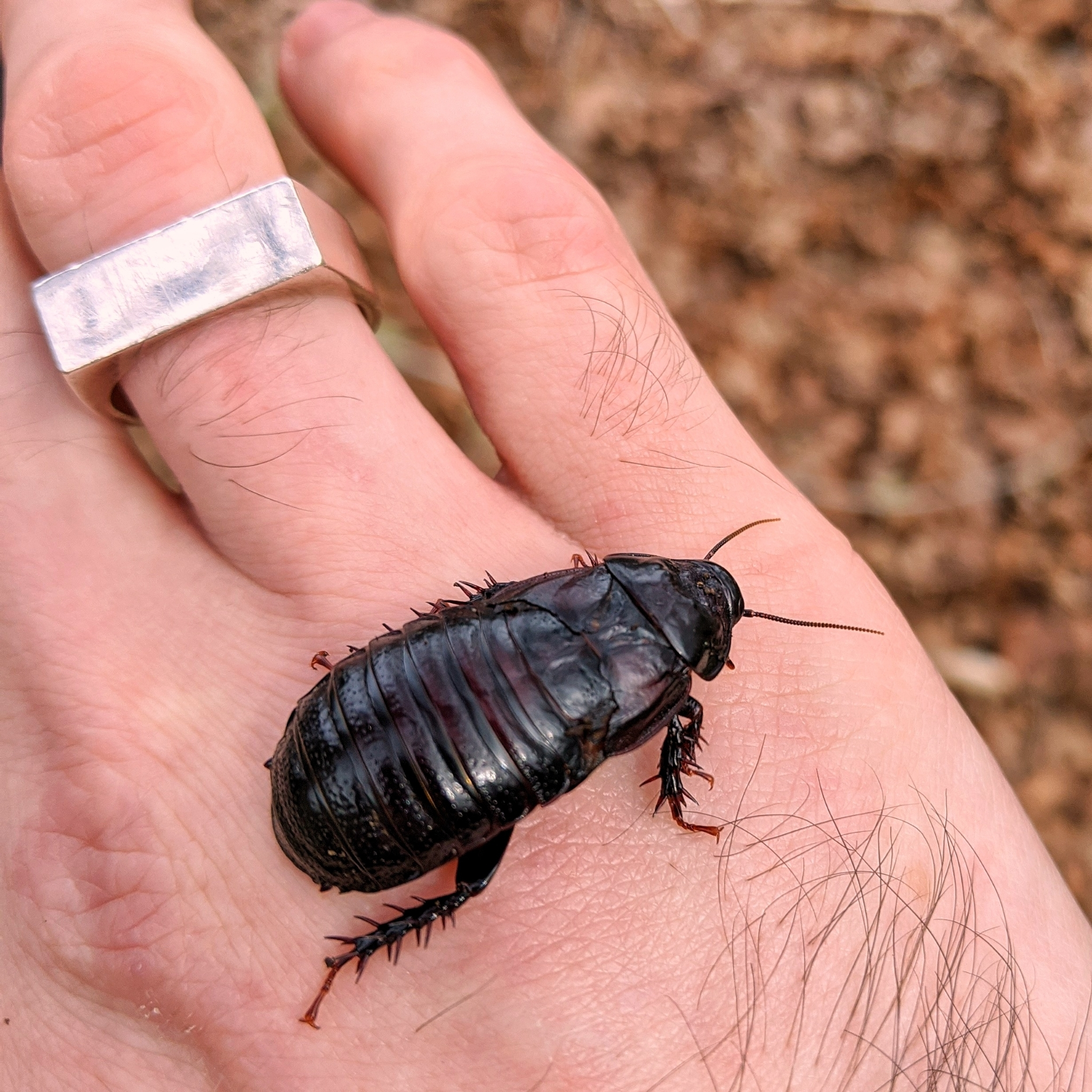

Scientific classification
- Kingdom: Animalia
- Phylum: Arthropoda
- Clade: Pancrustacea
- Class: Insecta
- Order: Blattodea
- Family: Blaberidae
- Genus: Panesthia
- Species: P. cribrata

Binomial name
- Panesthia cribrata Saussure 1864

Synonyms
- Panesthia cetrifera Rehn, 1904; Panesthia laevicollis Saussure, 1873; Proterodia punctatissima Costa, 1866; Panesthia quadriglumis Saussure, 1895

= Panesthia cribrata =

Species of cockroach

Panesthia cribrata, commonly called the Australian wood cockroach, is a wood-eating species found in rotten logs. It is found from south east Queensland south to the east coast to Tasmania, also seen at Norfolk Island. It depends on wood for sustenance, and manufactures enzymes that digest cellulose.
