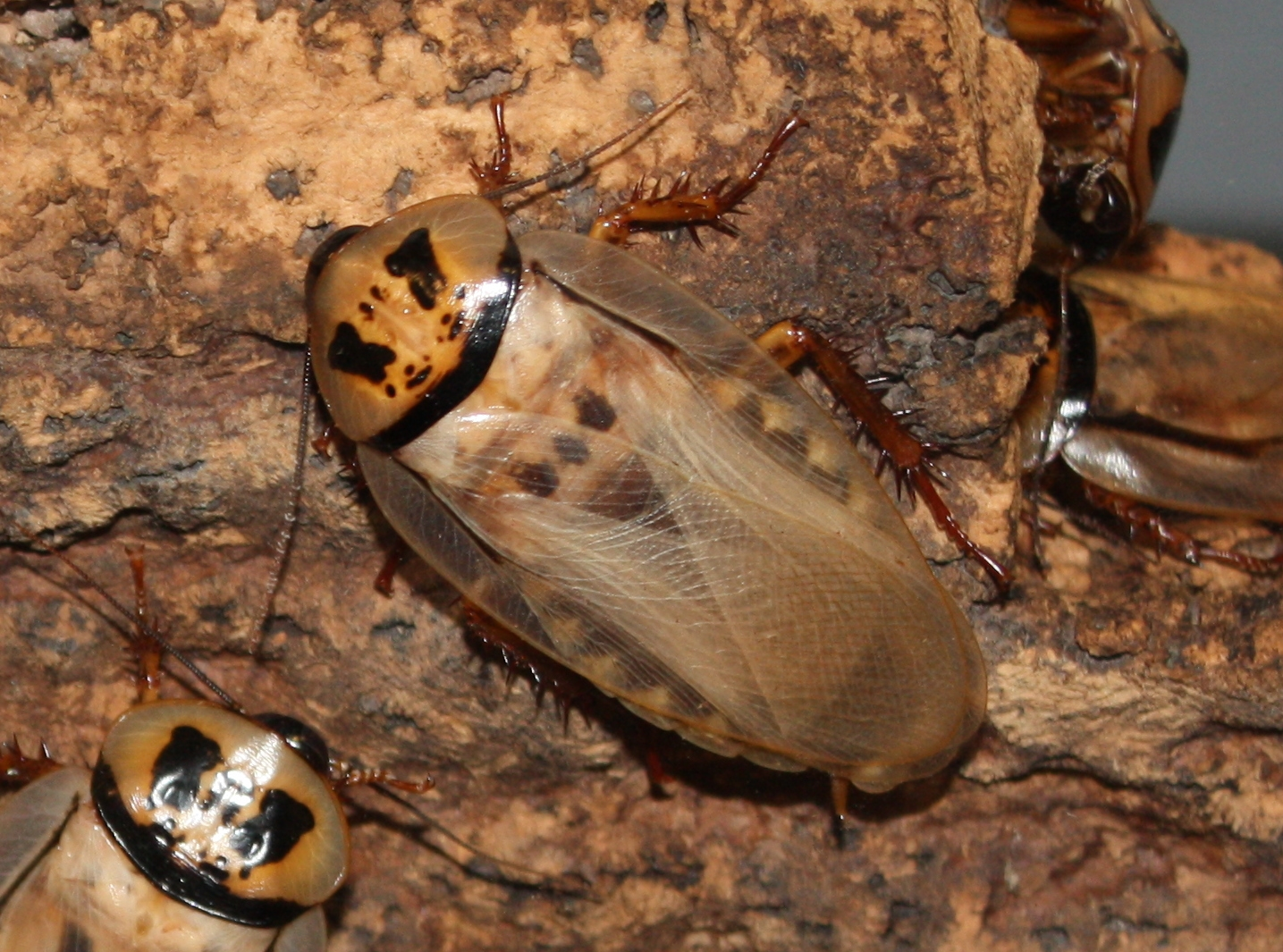

Scientific classification
- Kingdom: Animalia
- Phylum: Arthropoda
- Clade: Pancrustacea
- Class: Insecta
- Order: Blattodea
- Family: Blaberidae
- Genus: Eublaberus
- Species: E. distanti

Binomial name
- Eublaberus distanti (Kirby, WF 1903)
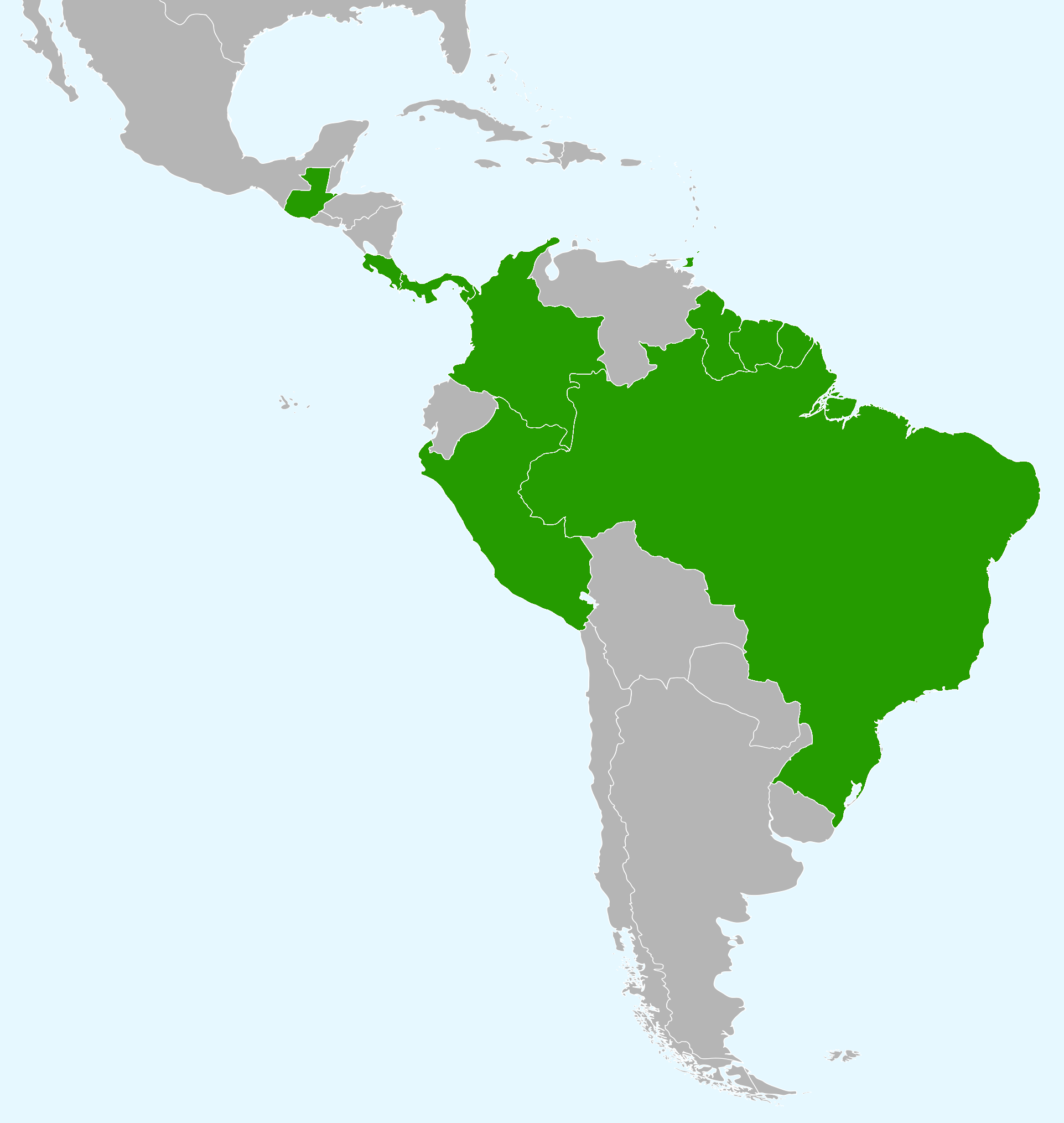
- Range by country

Synonyms
- Blaberus biolleyi Rehn, JAG 1905; Blaberus distanti Kirby, WF, 1903

= Eublaberus distanti =

Species of cockroach

Eublaberus distanti, known as the Six-spotted cockroach, Four-spotted cockroach, Four-spot cockroach, or Trinidad bat-cave cockroach, is a primarily cave-dwelling Central and South American cockroach of the genus Eublaberus (Hebard, 1920) and named after William Lucas Distant.

Nymphs turn a dark brown, and the common name "six spotted cockroach" refers to six yellow spots along the sides of the nymph. Adults of both genders have wings but do not fly. They grow to approximately 6.4 cm (2.5 in) in length. Males are generally smaller than females, with longer wings, and a small rear sternite compared to females.

== Range ==
E. distanti are found in Trinidad and Tobago, Guatemala, Costa Rica, Panama, Colombia, French Guiana, Suriname, Guyana, Brazil, and Peru.

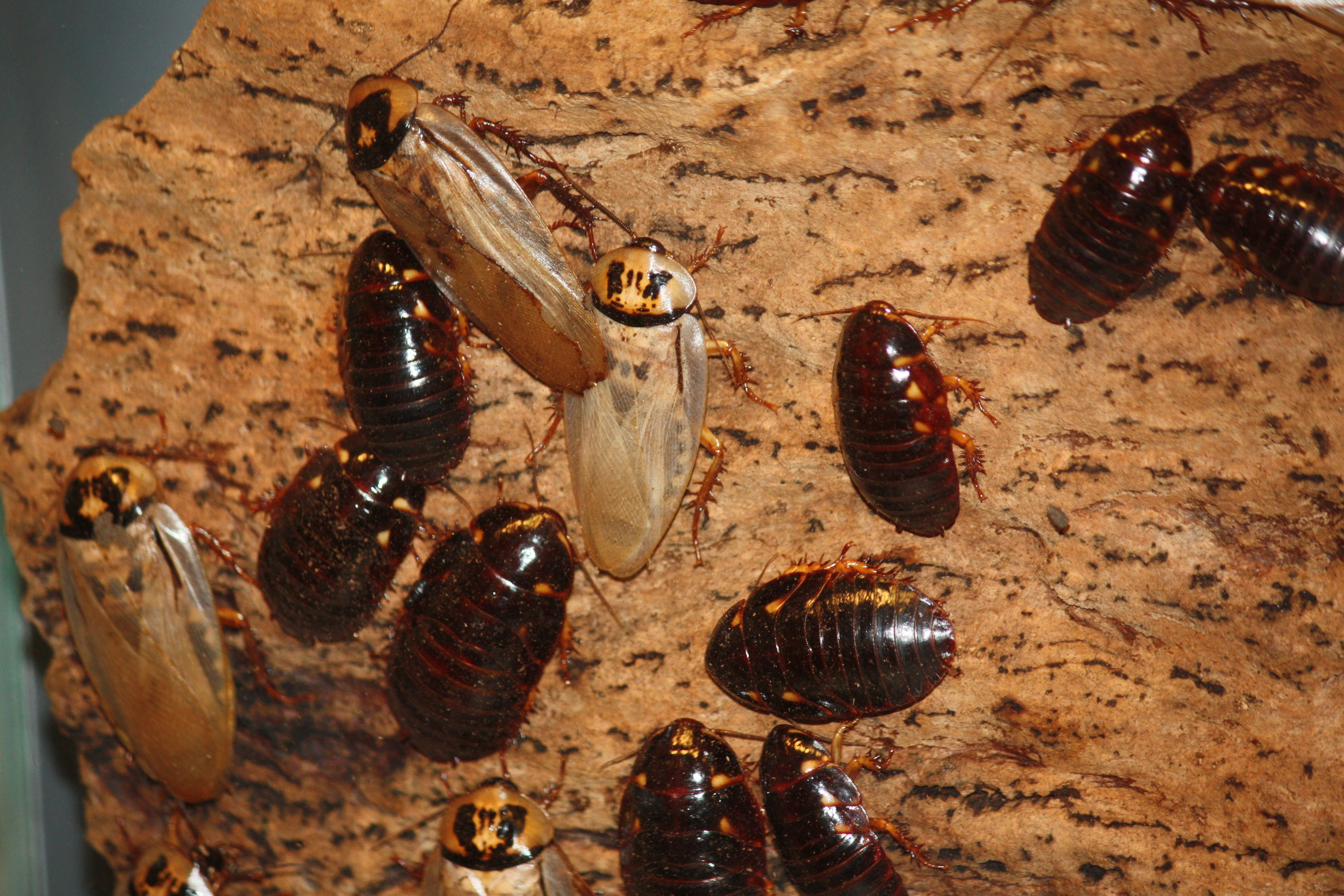
Adult and juvenile Eublaberus distanti. 4–6 yellow spots on juveniles.

== Habitat ==
E. distanti in Trinidad were observed to prefer relatively dry guano-rich areas in caves, but are occasionally found in rotting logs, under decaying litter, in epiphytes, and in "the rot holes and hollows of trees, particularly those that house bats." Nymphs burrow in organically rich soil on cave floors until their 6th or 7th instar, then climb onto rocky, often guano-covered walls. Caves with guano support typically contain very large populations of a small number of cockroach species that are able to "exploit the abundant, rich, but rather monotonous food bonanza." A single chamber of a Trinidad cave housed more than 43,000 E. distanti.

== Diet ==
E. distanti is a scavenger, taking advantage of any animal or vegetable matter available, picking out energy-rich parts of food presented to them. In Tamana Cave, Trinidad, E. distanti wait buried beneath guano nightly, with antennae extended above the surface, until local insectivorous bats return from foraging around 3:00 a.m., then emerge to consume the fresh guano droppings. A local frugivorous bat is found in the same cave, but E. distanti only burrow in their droppings, rather than eat them.

== Pheromones ==
A tracheal gland of E. distanti associated with the second abdominal spiracle secretes an alarm pheromone that triggers a disruption and escape behavior, and mandibular glands secrete an aggressive pheromone and an aggregation pheromone. A defense response against predators of younger nymphs is to burrow in guano, while older nymphs and adults crawl into crevices. Aggregations of E. distanti were observed to be relatively stable within E. distanti, with 90% remaining in the same group over a 30-day period, although it wasn't clear if the loyalty was toward the group or its location.

== Parasites ==
A new genus and species of ectoparasitic mite, Blaberpolipus cavernicola (n. gen, n. sp.), was described in 2003 from samples found on Peruvian specimens of E. distanti and Blaberus parabolicus.

== Uses ==
=== Feeder insects ===
E. distanti are kept and raised as feeder insect for captive reptiles, amphibians, tarantulas and other insectivores. While generally suitable nutritionally, a comparison with other popular feeder cockroaches (Blatta lateralis, known as lats, and Gromphadorhina portentosa, known as Madagascar hissing cockroaches), crickets, and beetle larvae found their fat content to be higher, making it a poorer protein source except in certain circumstances.

=== Blatticomposting ===
Eublaberus cockroaches are well suited for experiments in blatticomposting, the use of cockroaches to convert human food wastes into compost. They are relatively easy to care for and breed in captivity, and tolerate crowding well.
