= Periplaneta elegans =

Scientific classification
- Kingdom: Animalia
- Phylum: Arthropoda
- Clade: Pancrustacea
- Class: Insecta
- Order: Blattodea
- Family: Blattidae
- Genus: Periplaneta
- Species: P. elegans

Binomial name
- Periplaneta elegans Hanitsch, 1927

Species of cockroach

Periplaneta elegans is a species of cockroach in the genus Periplaneta of the family Blattidae.

It was first scientifically described in 1928 by Hanitsch.

== Distribution ==
The species is found in China and Vietnam.
