= Periplaneta aboriginea =

Scientific classification
- Kingdom: Animalia
- Phylum: Arthropoda
- Class: Insecta
- Order: Blattodea
- Family: Blattidae
- Genus: Periplaneta
- Species: P. aboriginea

Binomial name
- Periplaneta aboriginea Roth, 1994

Species of cockroach

The aboriginal cockroach (Periplaneta aboriginea) is a species of cockroach belonging to the family Blattidae. Unlike the misnamed Australian cockroach, this is an Australian native endemic, only recorded from the northern part of the Great Dividing Range in Queensland, as far north as the Cape York Peninsula.

This species, which is capable of flight, is usually found underneath tree bark.
