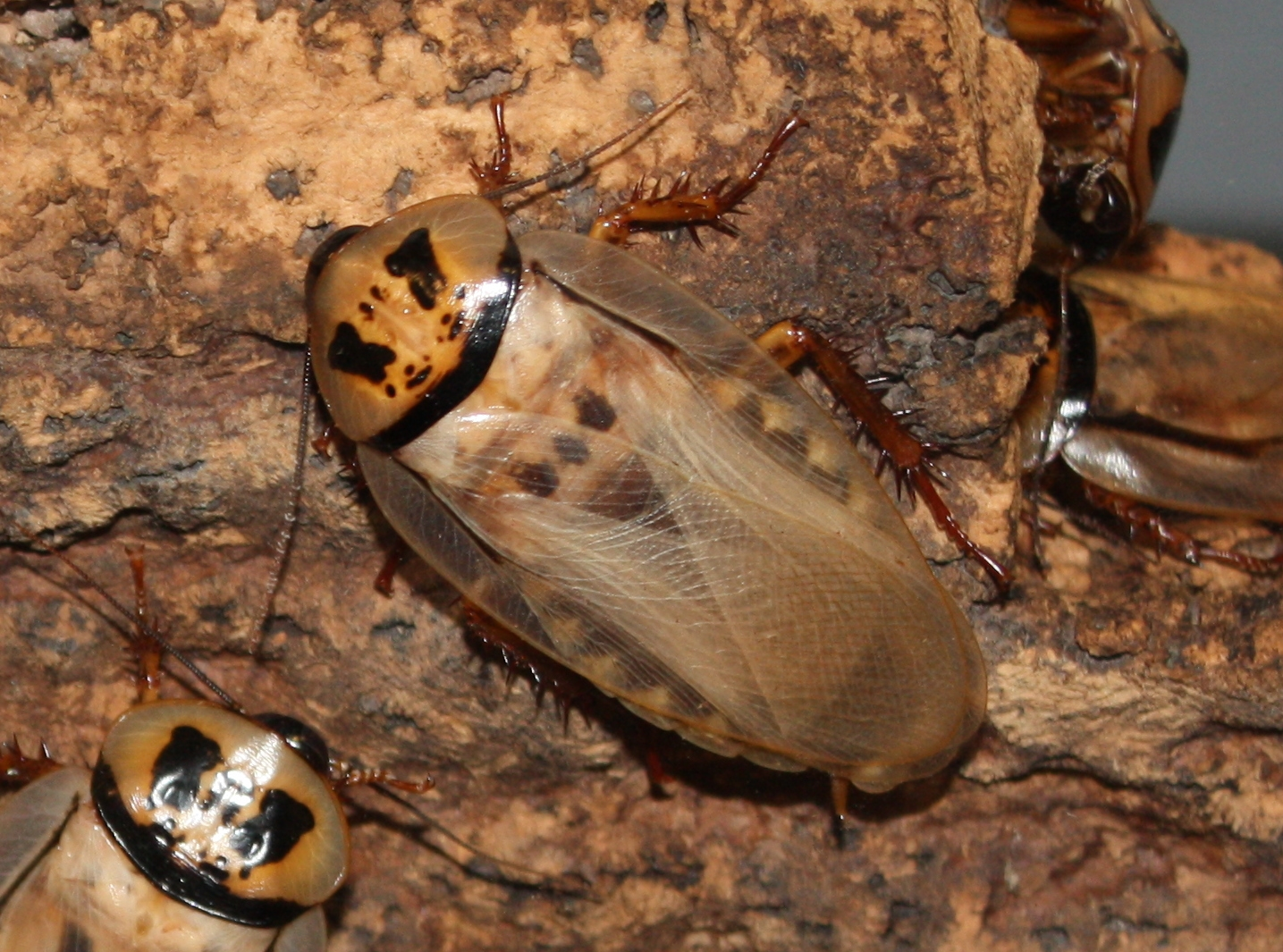
- Eublaberus distanti, the genus type species

Scientific classification
- Kingdom: Animalia
- Phylum: Arthropoda
- Clade: Pancrustacea
- Class: Insecta
- Order: Blattodea
- Family: Blaberidae
- Subfamily: Blaberinae
- Genus: Eublaberus; Hebard, 1920

Species
- see text

= Eublaberus =

Genus of cockroaches

Eublaberus is a genus of South American cockroaches in the subfamily Blaberinae, identified by Morgan Hebard in 1920.

== Description ==
Among the differences from the related genus Blaberus are proportionately somewhat shorter, stouter limbs, a broad blackish bar on the caudal margin (rear) of the pronotum, and angulation on the lateral margins (sides) of the pronotum.

== Species ==
The Cockroach Species File lists:

1. Eublaberus argentinus Hebard 1921
2. Eublaberus distanti (Kirby, W. F. 1903): The six spotted cockroach or Trinidad bat cave cockroach
3. Eublaberus fernandoi Lopes & de Oliveira 2000
4. Eublaberus immaculus (Saussure & Zehntner 1894)
5. Eublaberus marajoara Rocha e Silva 1972
6. Eublaberus posticus (Erichson, 1848): The orange-headed cockroach
7. Eublaberus serranus Lopes, Oliveira & Khouri, 2015
8. Eublaberus sulzeri (Guérin-Méneville 1857)
9. Eublaberus variegata Rocha e Silva 1972

E. distanti and E. posticus are primarily cave-dwelling cockroaches of Central and South America.
