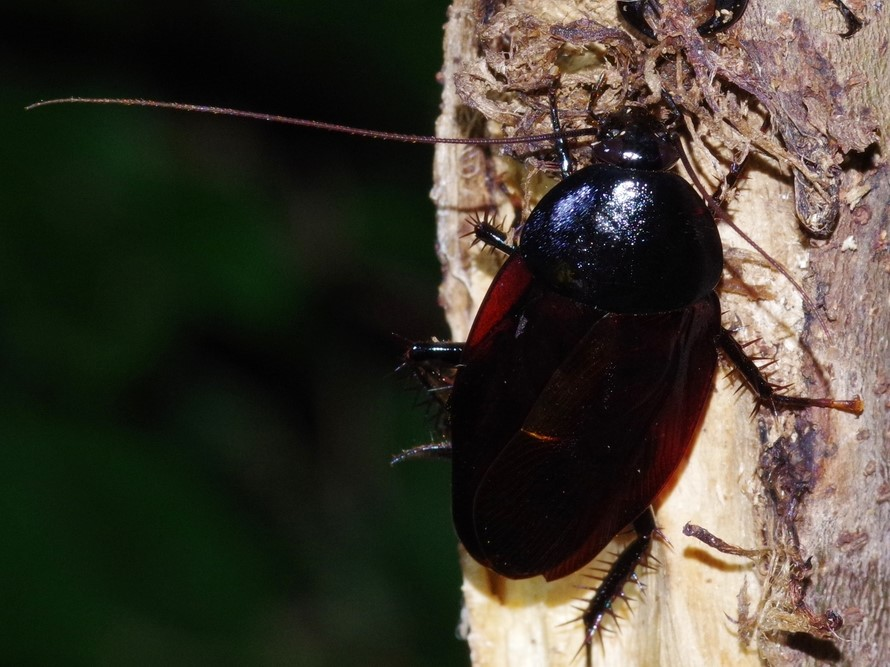

Scientific classification
- Kingdom: Animalia
- Phylum: Arthropoda
- Clade: Pancrustacea
- Class: Insecta
- Order: Blattodea
- Family: Blattidae
- Genus: Periplaneta
- Species: P. japanna

Binomial name
- Periplaneta japanna Asahina, 1969

= Periplaneta japanna =

Species of cockroach

Periplaneta japanna is a subtropical field-dwelling cockroach endemic to southern Japan. The Japanese common name means urushi cockroach, or lacquer tree cockroach.

== Coloration and living spaces ==
Nymphs and adults are a dark black, and typically live under stones and pieces of wood. Their ability to bore or live in rotting wood enables their spread via ocean currents.

== Distribution ==
The species is found on several Japanese islands, distributed continuously from Japan's southwestern Ryukyu Islands chain to the south of Kyushu Island, and on Hachijō-jima Island.

== Divergent evolution in nymph specimens ==
Nymph specimens from Hachijō-jima Island and Naha, Okinawa responded to photoperiodic stimuli quite differently during laboratory-induced diapause tests. This “might be regarded as the result of divergent evolution” between the parapatric populations.
