= Periplaneta lebedinskii =

Scientific classification
- Kingdom: Animalia
- Phylum: Arthropoda
- Clade: Pancrustacea
- Class: Insecta
- Order: Blattodea
- Family: Blattidae
- Genus: Periplaneta
- Species: P. lebedinskii

Binomial name
- Periplaneta lebedinskii Adelung, 1903

Species of insect

Periplaneta lebedinskii is a species of cockroach, a blattoid insect of the family Blattidae.

== Taxonomy ==
It was found for first time in 1903 by Adelung.
