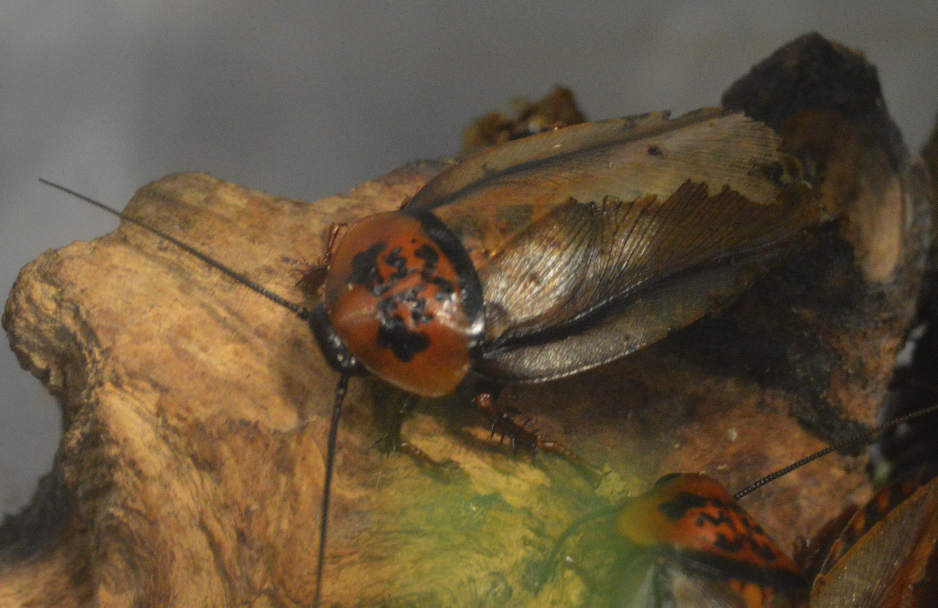

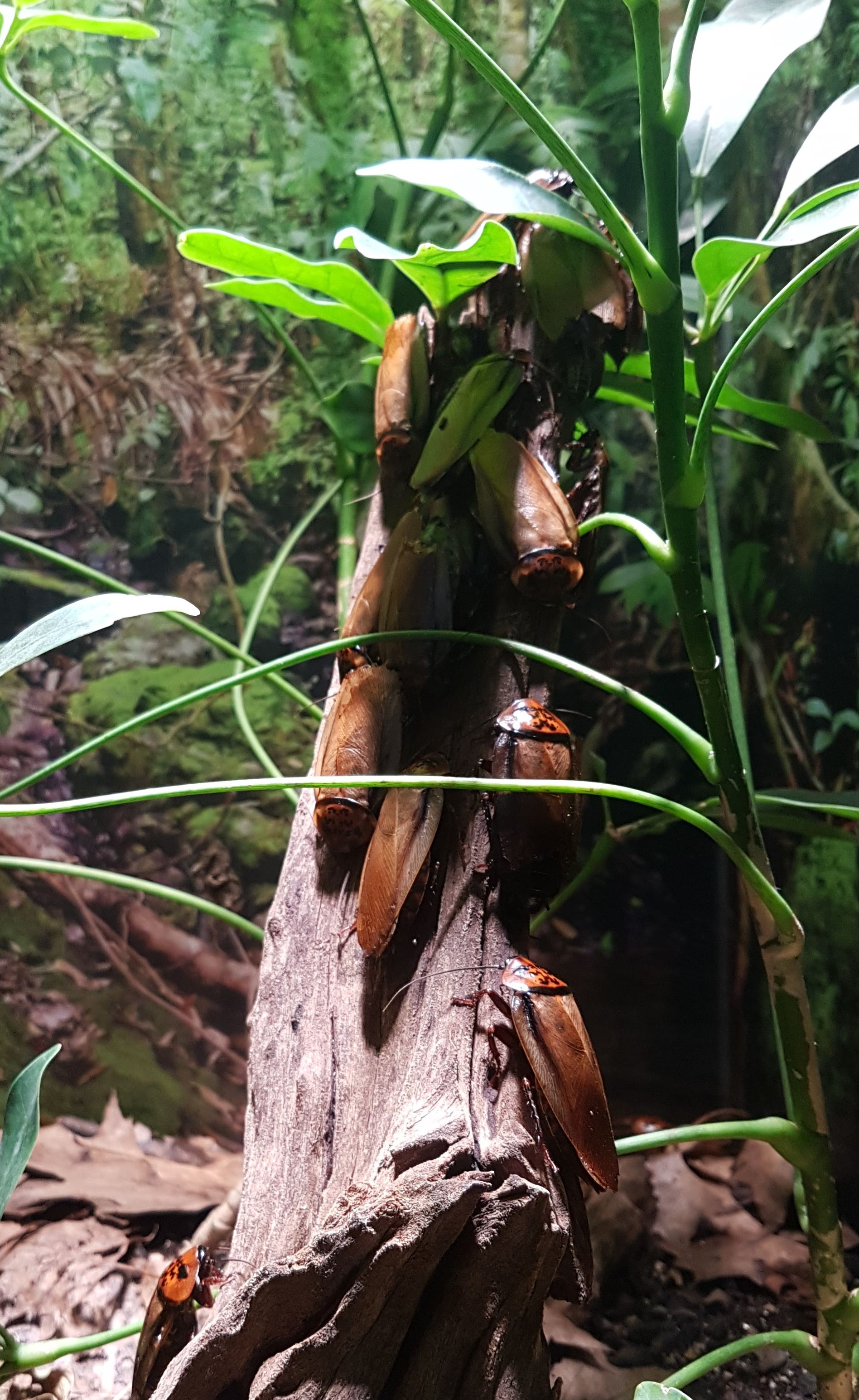

Scientific classification
- Domain: Eukaryota
- Kingdom: Animalia
- Phylum: Arthropoda
- Class: Insecta
- Order: Blattodea
- Family: Blaberidae
- Genus: Eublaberus
- Species: E. posticus

Binomial name
- Eublaberus posticus (Erichson, 1848)
- The range of Eublaberus posticus in Central and South America, shown in red

= Eublaberus posticus =

Species of cockroach

Eublaberus posticus, the orange head cockroach, is a species of cockroach native to Central and South America.

== Behaviour ==
Female individuals of E. posticus have been known to survive for up to 360 days on just water. They mate just after hatching, once the wings have expanded but before the cuticle has hardened. Females have been known to kick at the intersexual junction during intercourse.
