= Turkestan cockroach =

- Male
- Female

Scientific classification
- Kingdom: Animalia
- Phylum: Arthropoda
- Clade: Pancrustacea
- Class: Insecta
- Order: Blattodea
- Family: Blattidae
- Genus: Periplaneta
- Species: P. lateralis

Binomial name
- Periplaneta lateralis Walker, 1868

Synonyms
- List: Shelfordella lateralis (Walker, 1868) Blatta (Shelfordella) lateralis (Walker, 1868) Periplaneta tartara Saussure, 1874 Shelfordella tartara (Saussure, 1874) Shelfordella ahngeri Adelung 1910 Shelfordella tartara v. zarudnyi Adelung, 1910 Paralobotoptera sillemi Hantisch, 1935

Species of cockroach

Periplaneta lateralis (also Shelfordella lateralis, Blatta lateralis), commonly known as the Turkestan cockroach, red runner cockroach, or rusty red cockroach, is a primarily outdoor-dwelling cockroach native to an area stretching from northern Africa to Central Asia.

== Distribution ==
The species is found in Central Asia, the Caucasus Mountains, and northeastern Africa. It can be found throughout the area of Afghanistan, Azerbaijan, Egypt, India, Iran, Iraq, Israel, Jordan, Kashmir, Libya, Palestine, Pakistan, Saudi Arabia, Sudan, the United Arab Emirates, Russia (adventive) and the United States (adventive).

=== US introduction ===
The Turkestan cockroach was first noticed in the US in 1978, around the former Sharpe Army Depot in California, followed shortly after by appearances at Fort Bliss in Texas and several other military bases. Researchers believe the species arrived on military equipment returning from Central Asia, perhaps Afghanistan. Since then the species has been rapidly replacing the common oriental cockroach (Blatta orientalis) in urban areas of the Southwestern United States “as the most important peri-domestic species”, with advantages of laying more eggs and maturing more quickly than the oriental cockroach. “They typically inhabit in-ground containers such as water meter, irrigation, and electrical boxes, raises of concrete, cracks and crevices, and hollow block walls.” They are well established in the Southwest and parts of the Southeast, and have been reported in the Northeast. It has become established in California.

== Habitat ==
The Turkestan cockroach is primarily an outdoor insect, not known as an aggressive indoor pest, unlike some cockroach species such as the German and brown-banded cockroaches, though it will inhabit areas around dwellings where shelter can be found. However, in specific localities or tropical locations, it can become a significant indoor pest. Of occasional indoor interlopers, males are more commonly encountered than females, due to their ability to fly and an attraction to lights. In Arabia, it lives beneath stones in damp hollows, desert farms, and wadis, feeding primarily at night.

== Description ==
Adults measure around 3 cm (1.2 in) in length. Adult males are a brownish orange or red, are slender, and have long, yellowish wings which allow it to attract females and to glide. Adult females are dark brown to black, with cream-colored markings on the shield and a cream-colored stripe edging its wings; they are broader than males, and have short vestigial wings. The ootheca is 9–12 mm (0.35–0.47 in) long, and it takes about 118–137 days for the eggs to hatch into nymphs. Nymphs are brown in front, black on the rear, and are wingless.

Mating

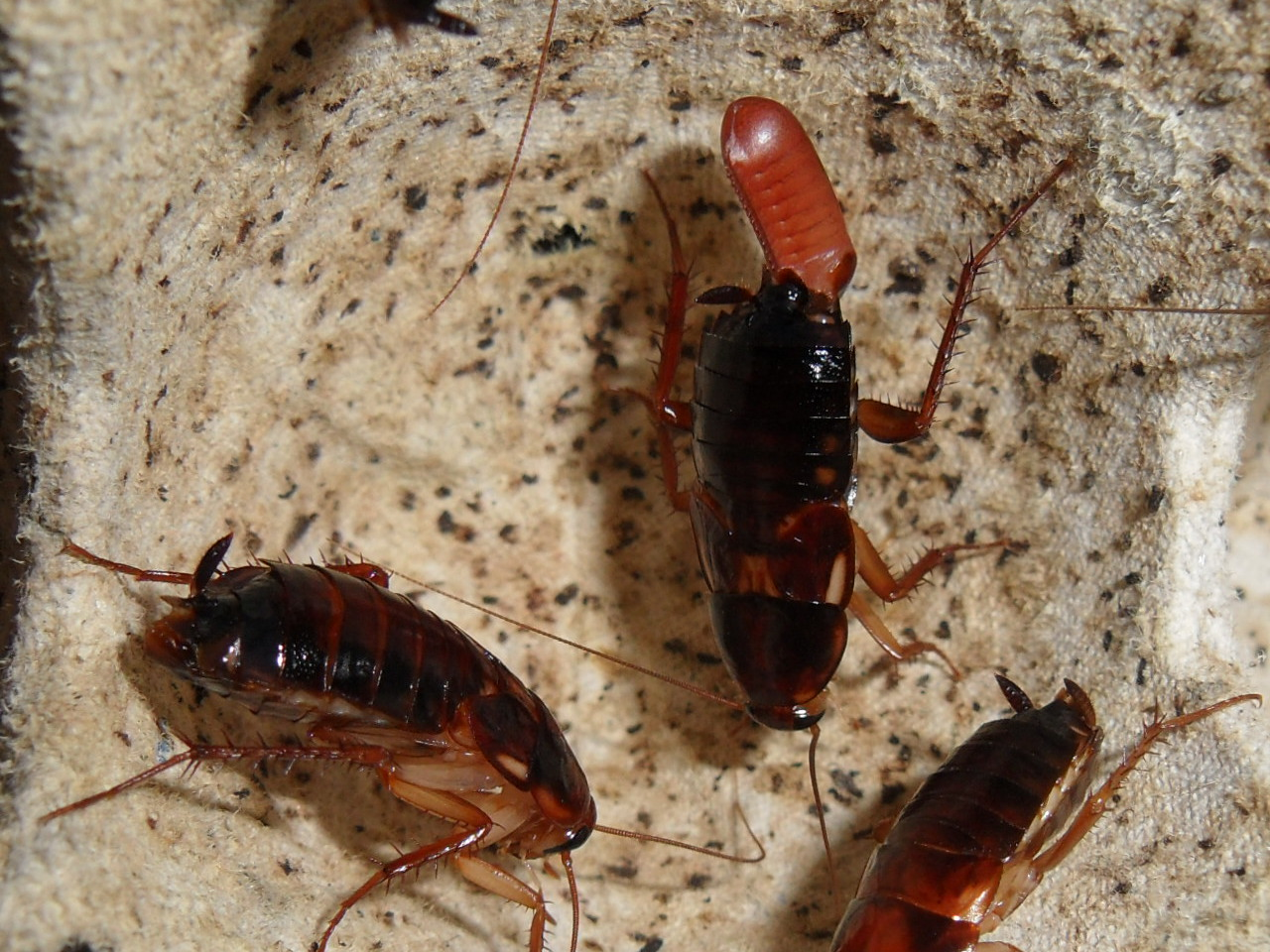
Laying an ootheca

Nymph

Adult female

Adult male

== Ecology ==
P. lateralis has been identified in Iraq as a host for larvae of the parasitoid wasp Ampulex assimilis. An adult wasp stings the cockroach, pulls or leads it by its antenna to the wasp's nest, deposits its egg on the femur of the cockroach's midleg, then closes the nest with debris. Upon hatching, the wasp larva feeds externally, then bores into the cockroach for further food and pupation.

== Uses ==
Captive bred Turkestan cockroaches feeding on vegetable scraps

=== Pet food ===
In the US, Turkestan cockroaches are sometimes kept to feed to pet reptiles and other insectivores, chosen partly because they can't climb smooth surfaces and don't burrow. Cockroaches have been replacing crickets, the most popular feeder insect for decades, due to the cricket's noise, odor, short lifespan, and expense. Turkestan cockroaches are a popular choice of species, and are readily available for sale over the Internet, which may hasten their spread to new habitats.

Although reliable information on specific dietary requirements of insectivores is scant, Turkestan cockroaches provide a high-protein, low fat nutrition composition similar to crickets, more so than mealworms or superworm larvae provide. The gut contents of the cockroach, depending on its diet, may provide essential nutrients unavailable from a cockroach with an empty gut.

In a study of commercially ordered specimens, small second instar nymphs (0.9–1.3 cm or 0.35–0.51 in) consisted of 21% dry matter, made of 76% crude protein and 14% crude fat, while medium third instar nymphs (1.3-1.9 cm) consisted of 28% dry matter, made of 53% crude protein and 27% crude fat. Mineral content is well represented except for a low calcium:phosphorus ratio typical in cockroaches, and calcium supplementation may be advisable. Vitamin A and E content was relatively low, and is generally significantly higher in free-ranging cockroaches. Insectivores which fed on unsupplemented invertebrates have been found to suffer from vitamin A deficiencies, and a study of panther chameleons (Furcifer pardalis) found vitamin A deficiency shortened life spans and reduced reproduction rates.

Turkestan cockroaches are rich in vitamin B12.

== Gallery ==
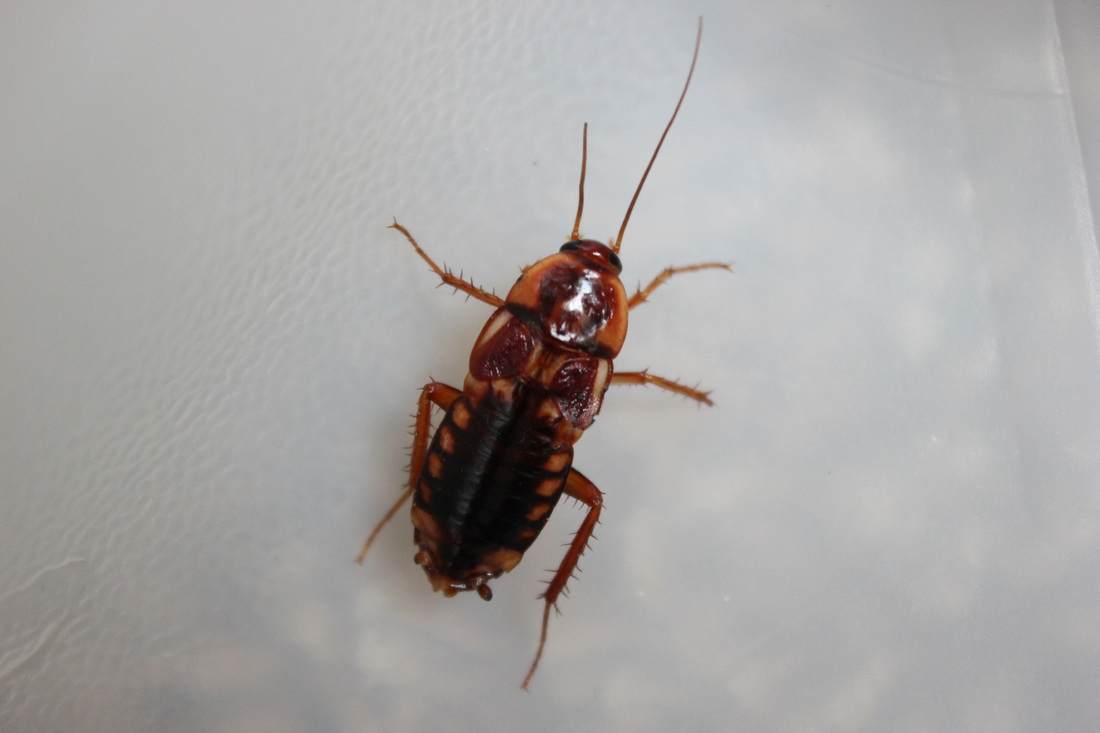
A not so healthy light colored adult female

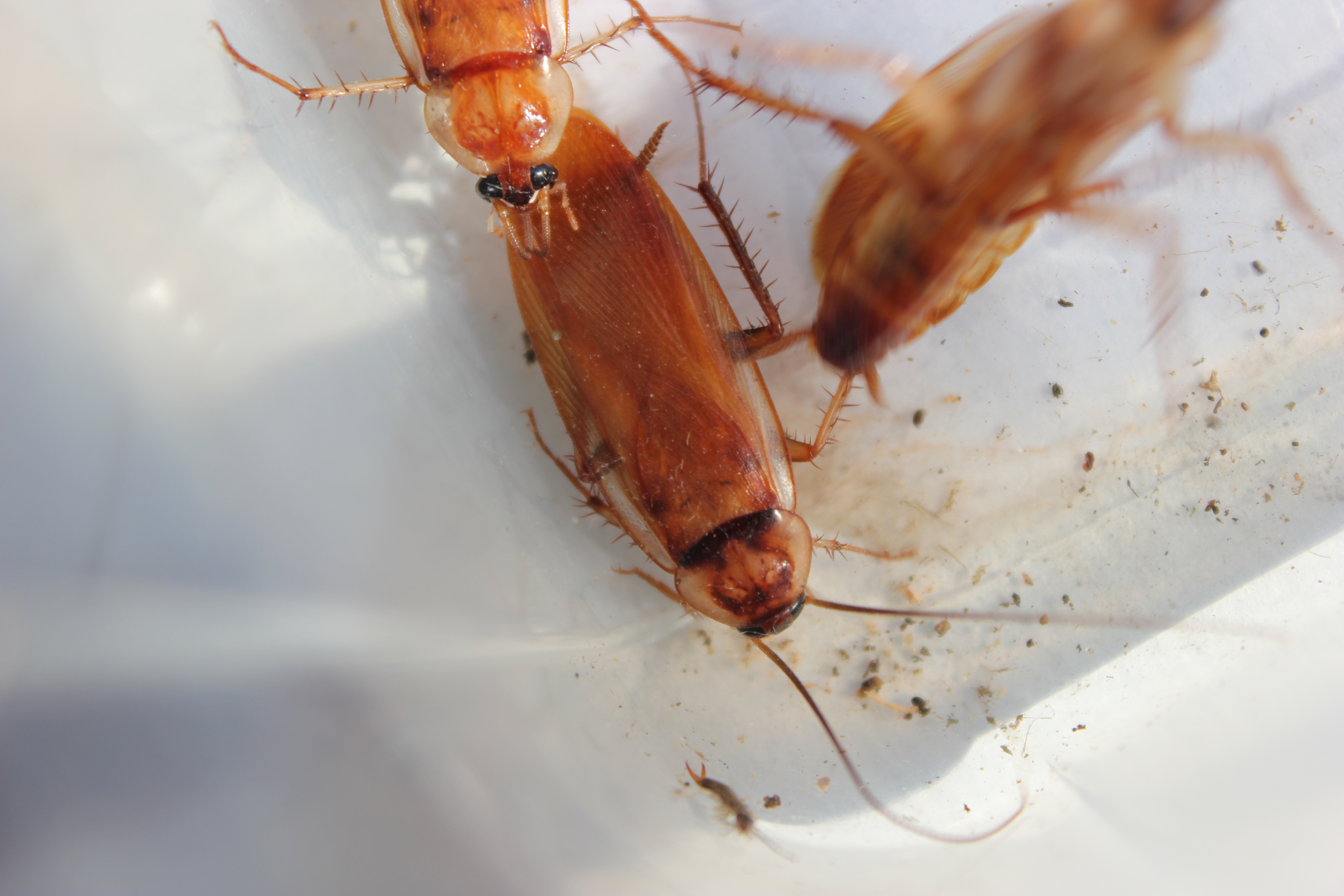
Adult males

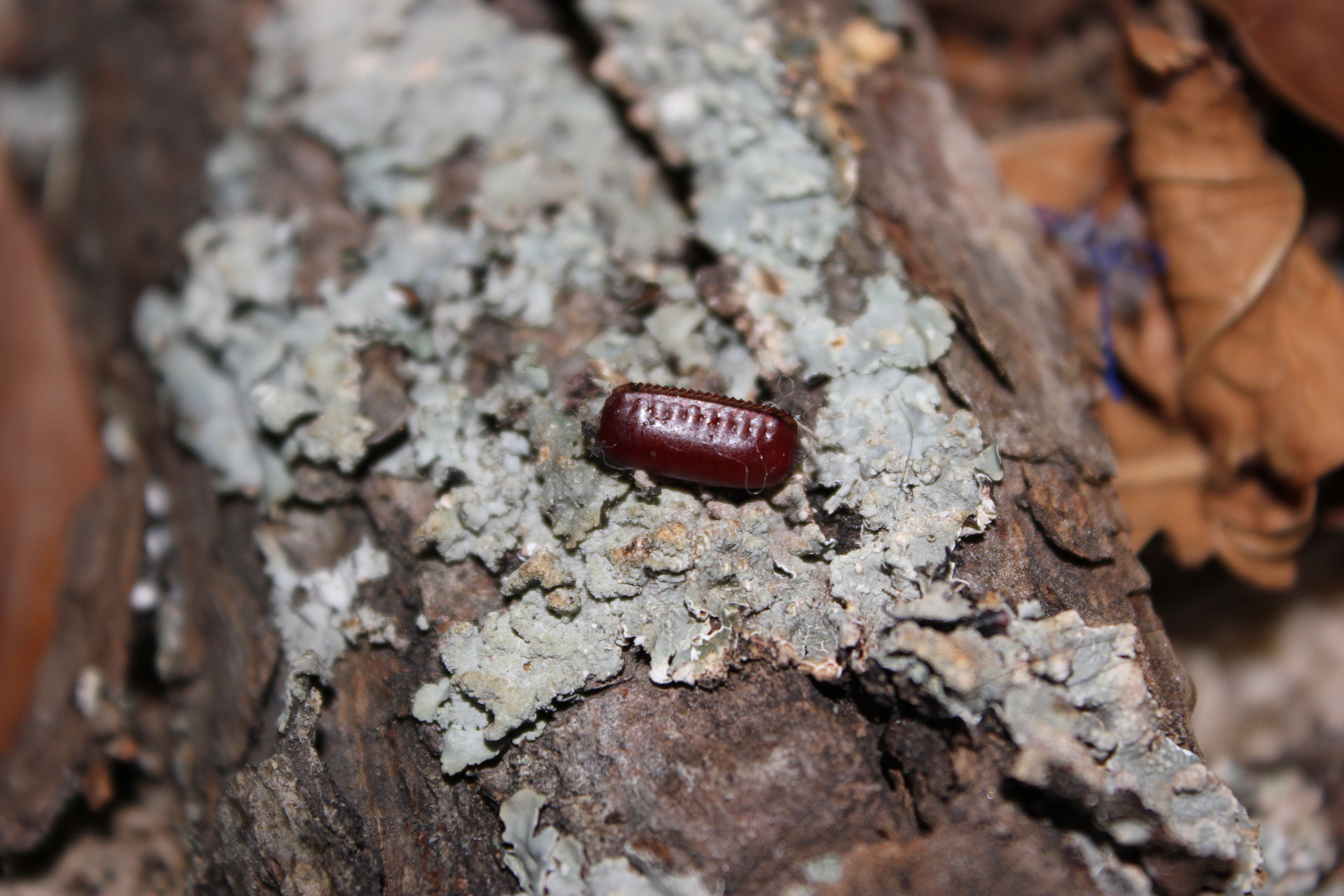
Ootheca

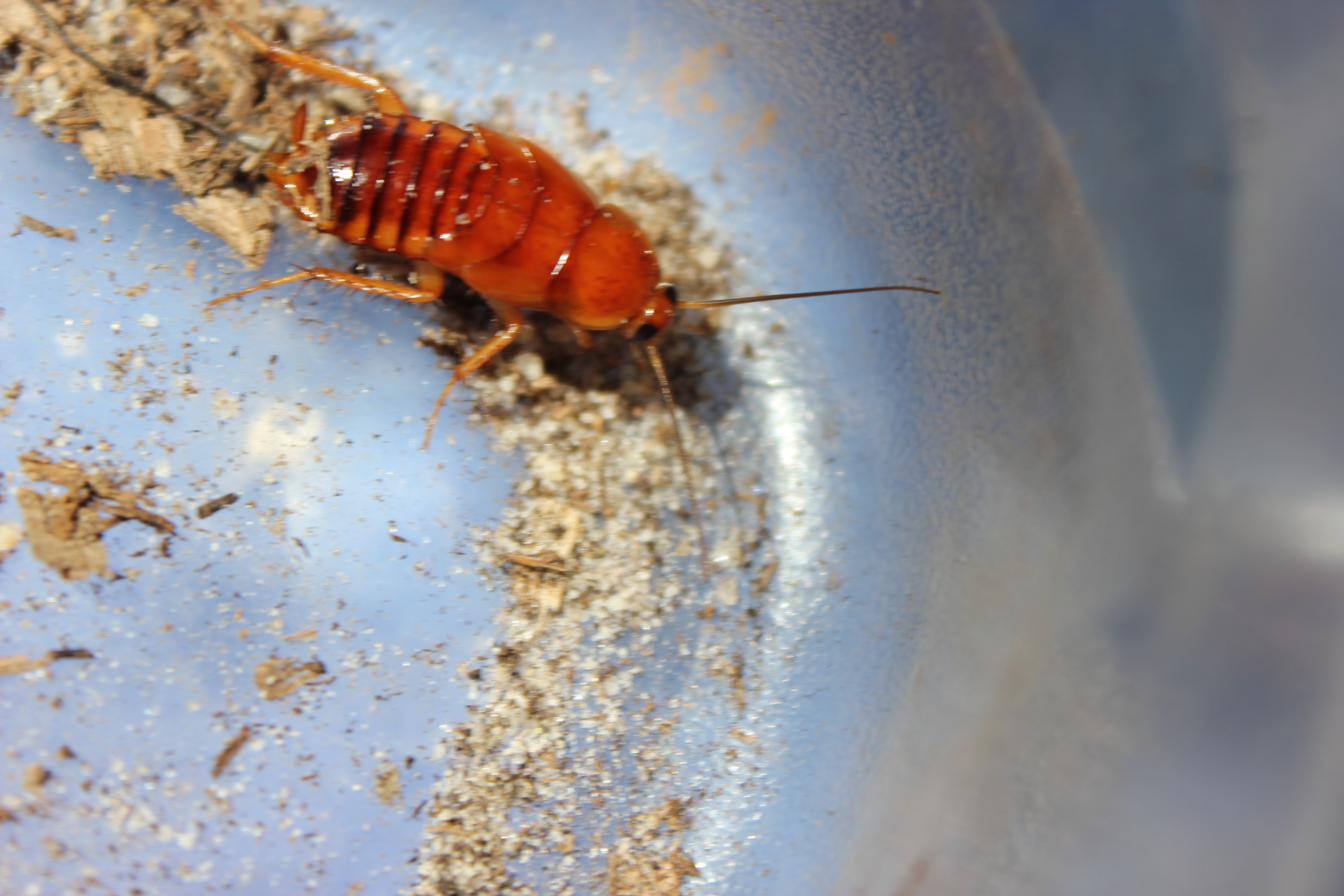
Sub-adult male Turkestan Roach nymph

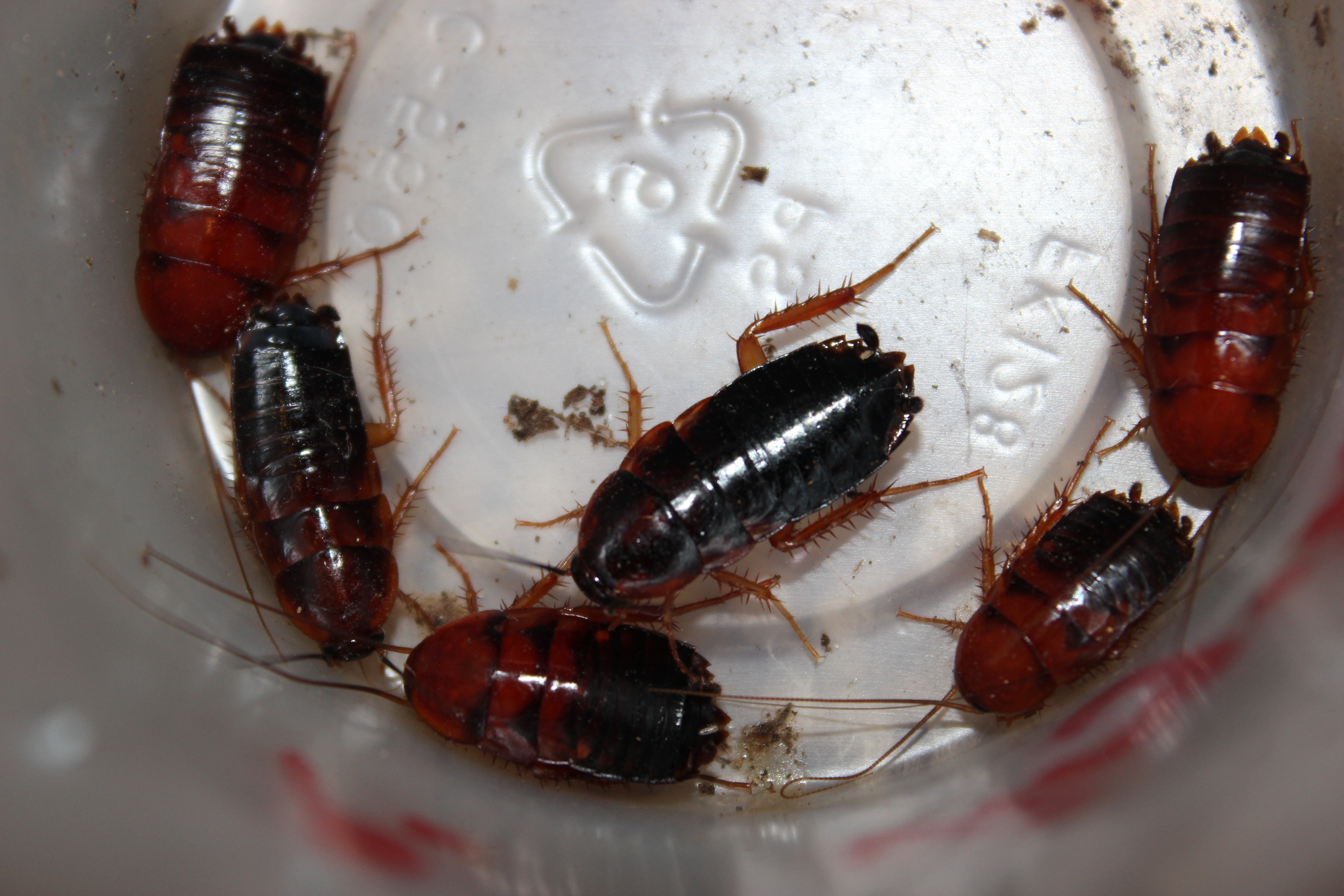
Female Turkestan Roach nymphs. Notice the variation in color and patterns.

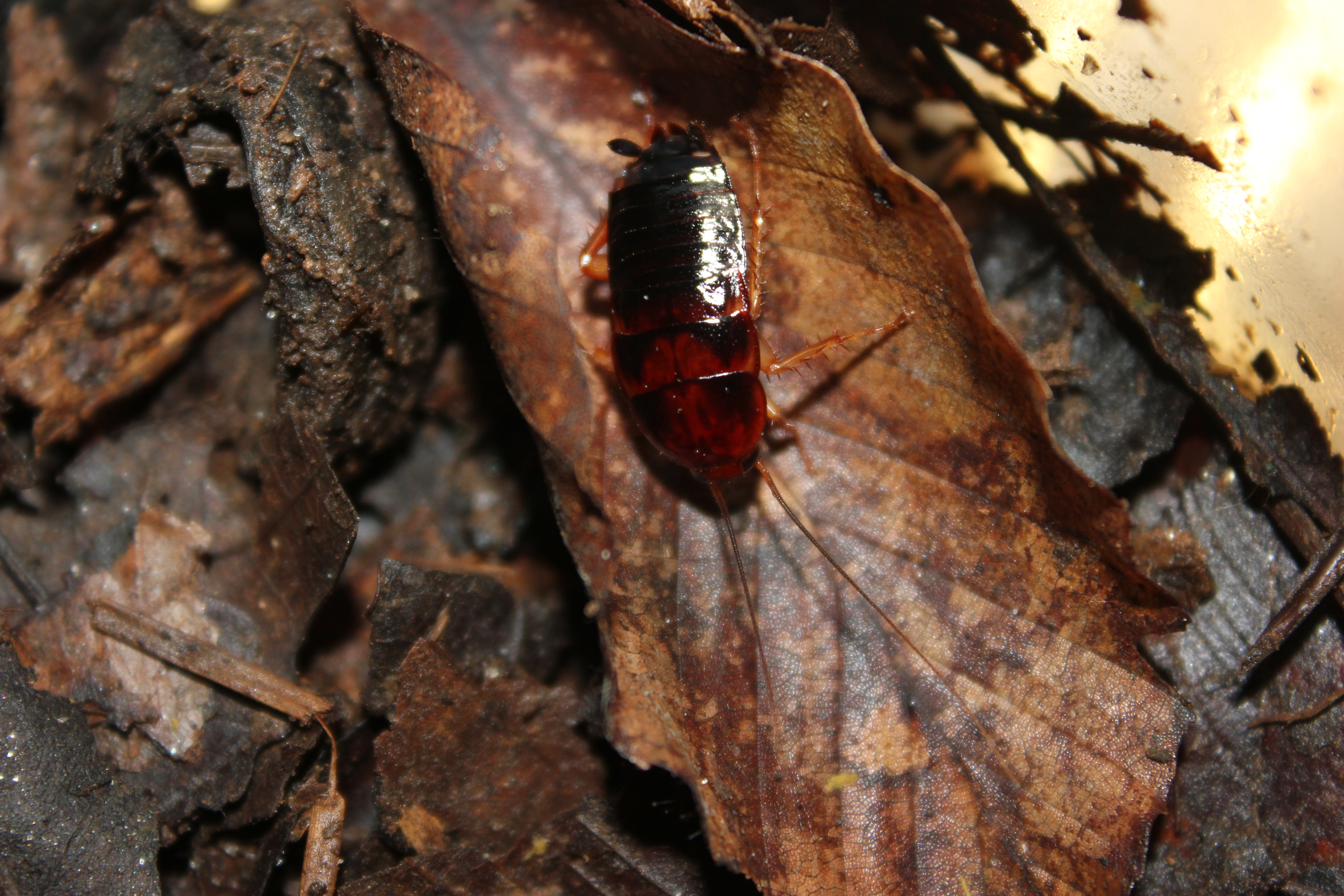
Nymph

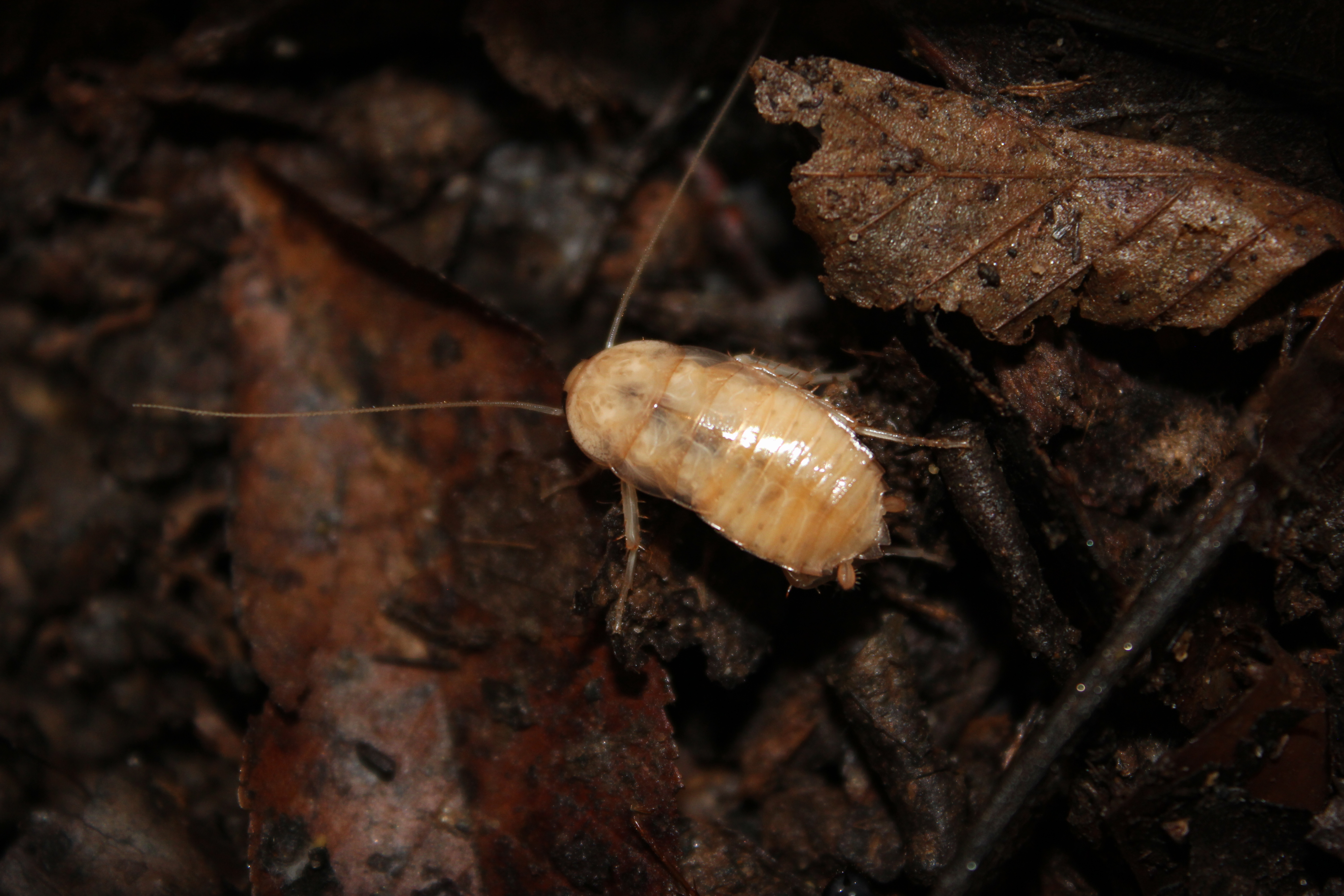
A recently molted nymph.
