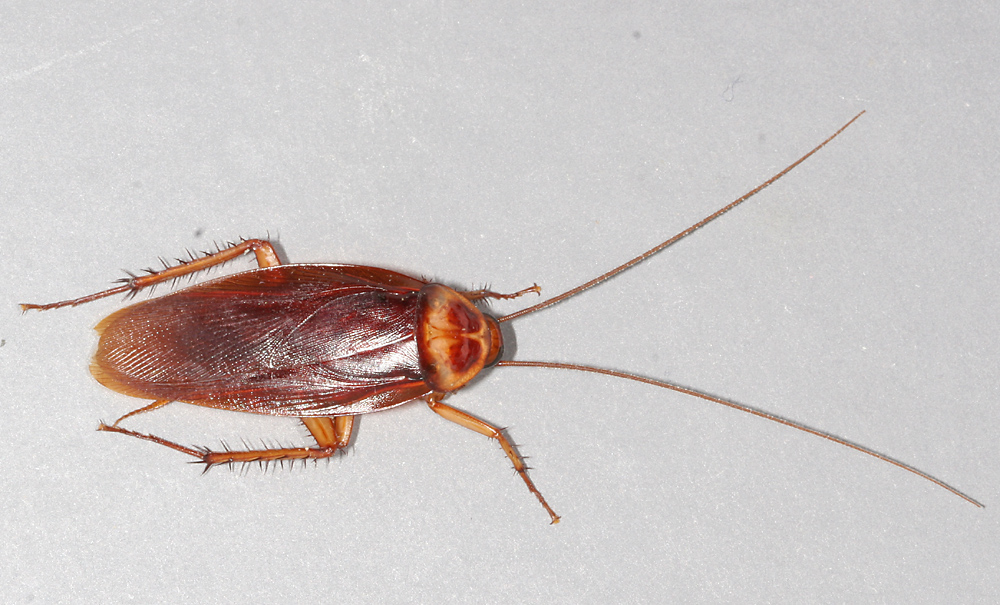
- Periplaneta americana

Scientific classification
- Kingdom: Animalia
- Phylum: Arthropoda
- Clade: Pancrustacea
- Class: Insecta
- Order: Blattodea
- Family: Blattidae
- Subfamily: Blattinae
- Genus: Periplaneta; Burmeister, 1838

Synonyms
- Cacerlaca Saussure, 1864; Paramethana Shelford, 1909; Shelfordella Adelung, 1910

= Periplaneta =

Genus of cockroaches

Periplaneta is a genus of cockroaches containing some of the well-known pest species with cosmopolitan distributions, such as:

- Periplaneta americana (Linnaeus, 1758) – American cockroach
- Periplaneta lateralis Walker, 1868 - the Turkestan cockroach

== Species ==
The Cockroach Species File lists:

1. Periplaneta aboriginea Roth, 1994
2. Periplaneta affinis Saussure, 1869
3. Periplaneta americana (Linnaeus, 1758) - type species (as Blatta americana Linnaeus)
4. Periplaneta arabica (Bey-Bienko, 1938)
5. Periplaneta arisanica Shiraki, 1931
6. Periplaneta atemeleta Princis, 1966
7. Periplaneta atrata Bey-Bienko, 1969
8. Periplaneta atricollis Saussure, 1899
9. Periplaneta australis (MacLeay, 1827)
10. Periplaneta banksi Hanitsch, 1931
11. Periplaneta basedowi Tepper, 1904
12. Periplaneta benzoni Princis, 1951
13. Periplaneta bicolor Shelford, 1908
14. Periplaneta blattoides Hanitsch, 1933
15. Periplaneta capeneri Princis, 1963
16. Periplaneta caudata Bey-Bienko, 1969
17. Periplaneta cylindrica (Thunberg, 1826)
18. Periplaneta diamesa Bey-Bienko, 1954
19. Periplaneta ebneri Princis, 1951
20. Periplaneta ferreirae Princis, 1963
21. Periplaneta fictor Princis, 1966
22. Periplaneta floweri Hanitsch, 1931
23. Periplaneta formosana Karny, 1915
24. Periplaneta indica Karny, 1908
25. Periplaneta japanna Asahina, 1969
26. Periplaneta lateralis Walker, 1868
27. Periplaneta lebedinskii Adelung, 1903
28. Periplaneta liui Bey-Bienko, 1957
29. Periplaneta malaica Karny, 1908
30. Periplaneta media Chopard, 1938
31. Periplaneta methanoides Brunner von Wattenwyl, 1898
32. Periplaneta monochroma Walker, 1871
33. Periplaneta nigra Princis, 1966
34. Periplaneta nitida (Bolívar, 1890)
35. Periplaneta quadrinotata Princis, 1950
36. Periplaneta robusta (Shelford, 1909)
37. Periplaneta savignyi Krauss, 1890
38. Periplaneta semenovi Bey-Bienko, 1950
39. Periplaneta spinosostylata Krauss, 1902
40. Periplaneta stygia Shelford, 1909
41. Periplaneta sublobata Bey-Bienko, 1969
42. Periplaneta suzukii Asahina, 1977
43. Periplaneta valida Brunner von Wattenwyl, 1893
44. Periplaneta vosseleri Shelford, 1908
